= Natalia García =

Retired Spanish rhythmic gymnast

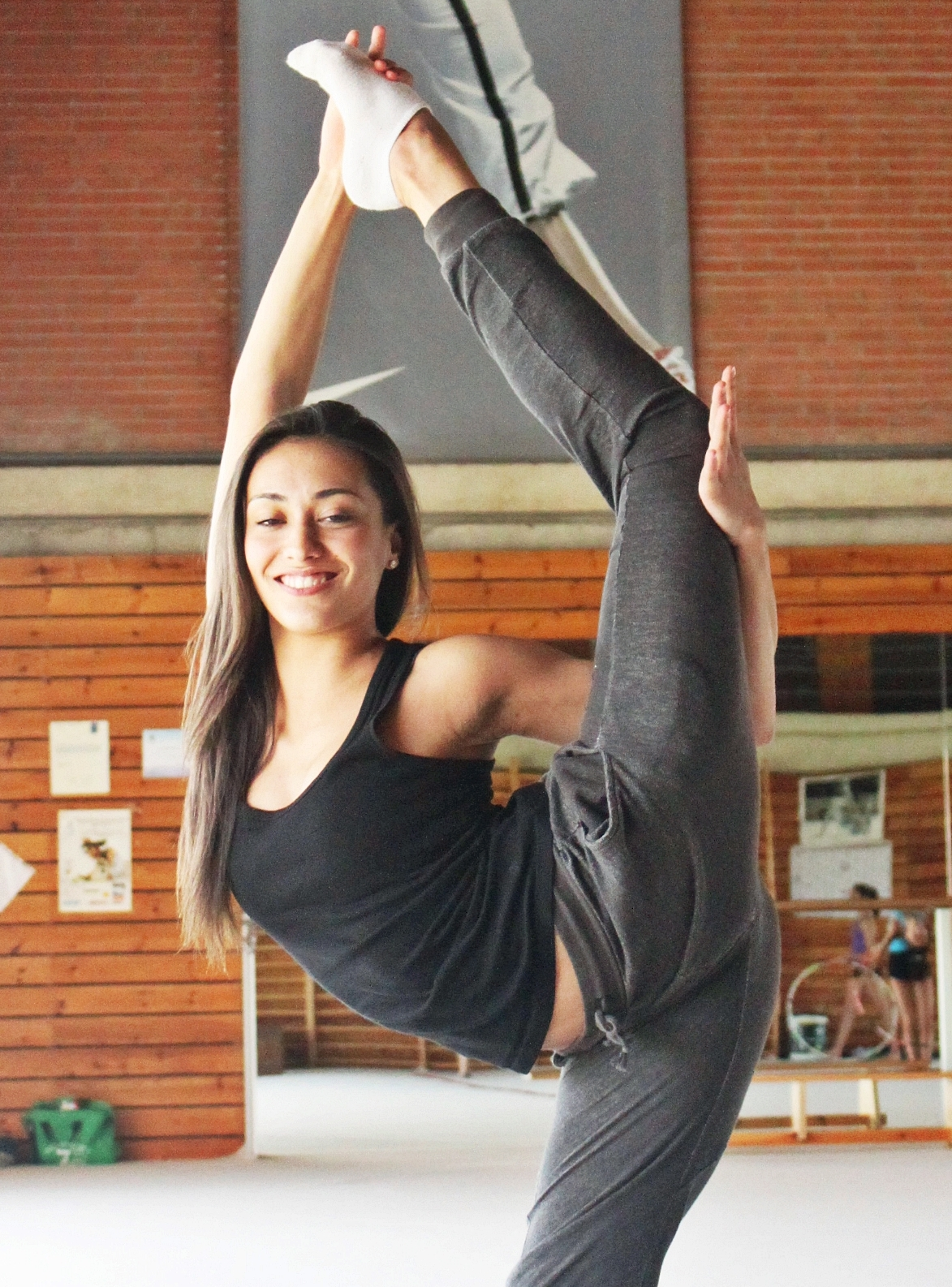

Personal information
- Full name: Natalia García Timofeeva
- Born: 5 August 1994 (age 32) Barcelona, Spain

Gymnastics career
- Discipline: Rhythmic gymnastics
- Country represented: Spain; (2008-2021)
- Club: Club Rítmica Panadés / Club Muntanyenc San Cugat
- Head coach: Mónica Viñals
- Former coach: Iratxe Aurrekoetxea
- Retired: yes

Natalia García Timofeeva (born 5 August 1994) is a retired Spanish rhythmic gymnast who was a member of Spain's national rhythmic gymnastics team from 2008 until her retirement in 2021. She has been 5 times nation champion counting all categories: 1 in alevín (2005), 2 in children (2006 and 2007), 1 in junior (2008) and 1 in junior honor (2009). She has also been 6 times national silver medalist as a senior (2011 - 2016) and won bronze in 2019. She retired on 13 November 2021 at the 6th Ciutat International Trophy in Barcelona after more than 20 years in the world of gymnastics.

== Personal life ==
Natalia was born in Terrassa, she lived there with her father Manuel Garcia, her mother Leila Timofeeva and her brother Toni. She took up rhythmic gymnastics when she was 6 at the Club Rítmica Panadés of Villafranca del Panadés, her maternal grandmother, Natasha, was a champion of acrobatic gymnastics in the Soviet Union, and his mother, Leila, also practiced rhythmic gymnastics in her childhood. Her favourite apparatuses were ball and clubs and her idol is Anna Bessonova. Natalia's ambition was to compete at the Olympic Games. She is the partner of the Tarragona model Sergio Carvajal since 2015. Garcia has maintained since her childhood a close bond and friendship with the former gymnast Almudena Cid. García speaks Catalan, Russian and Spanish.

== Career ==
In 2004 she entered the CAR (High Performance Centre) in Sant Cugat, Barcelona. She was 13th in the Spanish Championship in the alevín category. She teamed with Marina España. In 2005 García won her first national title in Benicarló, as part of the Catalan team. That year she was also champion of Catalonia.

In 2006 Natalia was a member of the Catalan national team, along with gymnasts like Esther Escolar and Almudena Cid. That year she won nationals again in the children category, title that would repeat the following season. That same year she competed in the No Limits Open in Belgium. In 2007 she competed as a member of a group along Raquel Calvo, Esther García, Julia Luna and Júlia Usón, winning nationals in Granada and participating in November in the Euskalgym in Durango.

As a junior Natilia won the Spanish Championship in 2008 and 2009. In 2008 she was called up by the national team for the World Cup in Portimão and for the European Championship in Turin. In November she participated in the Euskalgym. During 2009 she participated in international competitions in Paso de Calais and Thiais (in France), finishing 4th in both. At national level, this year she competed in the Queen's Cup, where she was in 2nd place behind senior Carolina Rodriguez.

From 2010 she joined as senior the national team. That same year Natalia was 4th at the national championships. She represented Spain at the World Cup in Pesaro and the 2010 World Championship held in Moscow, where by participating only with ball and hoop (finishing 20th and 46th respectively), she could only reach 126th place in the All-Around, while in the team competition she was 14th (along with Carolina Rodríguez, Júlia Usón and Marina Fernández). In November 2010 she participated in the Euskalgym.

For the year 2011 she was national runner-up in A Coruña. She was chosen to participate in the European Championship in Minsk presenting the full program of the four apparatuses in group A, being 10th in teams with Júlia Usón. In September she participated in the World Championships in Montepellier, where she was 11th in the team category alongside Carolina Rodríguez and Júlia Usón, and 36th in the All-Around. She was also selected by an Italian club to participate in the Serie A (National League of Clubs of Italy, in which each club selects an international gymnast), which she could not attend due to injury.

In 2012 she won All-Around silver at nationals in Valladolid. She was also selected to participate in the Aeon Cup, where she was 13th overall and 8th by countries.

In 2013 she represented Spain in the Grand Prix of Thiais, finishing 24th with clubs, 26th with ribbon, and 16th with hoop and ball, thus finishing 22nd position in the All-Around. In the World Cup held in Corbeil she was 9th in the All-Around, 11th with ball, 10th with clubs, 10th with ribbon and 7th classified in the hoop final). After the technical control of the RFEG held at the CEARD in León, she was selected to be part of the Spanish team at the 2013 European Championship, which was held in Vienna. She participated with ball, hoop and clubs, finishing 13th with hoop, 36th with ball and 11th with clubs. Together with her teammates Carolina Rodríguez, and the Asturian Eugenia Onopko, Spain finished in 8th position. That year Natalia won silver at the Spanish Championships held in Valladolid. García was then selected for the Mediterranean Games in Mersin, where she was 6th. In August at the World Championship in Kyiv, she was 19th in the All-Around. In November 2013 he participated in the Euskalgym in Bilbao.

In early 2014 she suffered a fracture in a foot, which delayed her start of the season until May. In her first international competition of the year, the World Cup held in Minsk, she was 34th. On June 29 she proclaimed herself again runner-up at nationals in Granada, also obtaining silver with hoop, ball, maces and ribbon. In August she competed in the World Cup in Sofia, where she was 21st. Also in the same month she took part in the IV Meeting in Vitória, where she was 4th in both the All-Around and the ball final, and won three silver medals in the remaining finals. In September, at the World Championship in Izmir, she was 30th in the All-Around and 6th in the team competition with Carolina Rodríguez and Sara Llana. In November 2014 she participated in the Euskalgym in Vitoria.

In May 2015 Natalia competed at the European Championship in Minsk, where she 7th in the team category with Carolina Rodríguez. On July 4 she won silver at nationals in Pontevedra, she also got silver with hoop, ball and ribbon, and gold with clubs. In September she took part in the World Championship in Stuttgart, finishing 35th. She was also 10th in the team competition with Carolina Rodríguez, Sara Llana and Polina Berezina.

In June 2016 the Guadalajara World Cup was held, the first official international rhythmic gymnastics competition held in Spain since the World Cup Final in Benidorm in 2008. Natalia was 12th in the All-Around and the 8th place in the ribbon final. That same month she participated in the European Championship of Holon, where she obtained the 19th place in the All-Around. On 25 June she won silver at the Spanish Championships, she also won gold with ribbon and silver with clubs, ball and hoop.

In May 2017 she participated in the European Championship in Budapest, achieving the 12th place for teams with Sara Llana and Polina Berezina. On 22 November 2017 she underwent hip surgery. From September 2018 she trained under Mónica Viñals of the Sant Cugat Esportiu Gymnastics Club in the CAR of that city, as well as in Moscow, where she prepared the exercises for the 2019 season. In June 2019 she won All-Around bronze at the Spanish Championship in Palma de Mallorca, behind María Añó (silver) and Noa Ros (gold). In August she was 4th in the All-Around and bronze with ball at the Grácia Cup Budapest International Tournament. In September she participated in the World Championships with clubs and ribbon, achieving the 11th team position with Polina Berezina and María Añó.

Throughout 2021, Garcia competed in the World Cup events in Sofia, Tashkent, Baku and Pesaro. In June 2021 she competed in the European Championship in Varna, achieving the 19th position in the All-Around. Her retirement took place on 13 November 2021 at the 6th Ciutat International Trophy in Barcelona.

== Routine music information ==
Year	Apparatus	Music Title
2005	Free-hands	"The Merry-Go-Round Broke Down" by Cliff Friend and Dave Franklin
2006	Ball	Wiegenlied, Op. 49 Nº 4 by Johannes Brahms
2007	Ball	"The Pink Panther Theme" by Henry Mancini
2007	Hoop	Terry's Theme by Charlie Chaplin
2007	Ribbon	"O mio babbino caro" by Joshua Bell
2008	Hoop	"Con te partirò" by Andrea Bocelli
2008	Ball	"La zarzamora" by Paco de Lucía
2008	Rope	"Trashin' the Camp" by Phil Collins
2008	Ribbon	"O mio babbino caro" by Joshua Bell
2009	Hoop	"Anathema" by Balkan Horses Band / "Nimbooda" by Ismail Darbar / "Bhootni Ke" by Daler Mehndi
2009	Ball	"Celem, Celem" by Yildiz Ibrahimova
2009	Rope	"Locomotivo" by Andy J. Forest & Snapshots
2010	Hoop	"Anathema" by Balkan Horses Band / "Nimbooda" by Ismail Darbar / "Bhootni Ke" by Daler Mehndi
2010	Ball	"Celem, Celem" by Yildiz Ibrahimova
2010	Rope	"Farruca" by Paco de Lucía
2010	Ribbon	"To Victory" by Tyler Bates
2011	Hoop	"Flamenco bolero" by Maurice Ravel
2011	Ball	"Agua y vino" by Nuevo Tango Ensamble
2011	Clubs	"Tango Amore" by Edvin Marton
2011	Ribbon	"Tsigani" by Yildiz Ibrahimova
2012	Hoop	"Una patada en los huevos" / "La identidad inaccesible" by Alberto Iglesias
2012	Ball	"Agua y vino" by Nuevo Tango Ensamble
2012	Clubs	
2012	Ribbon	
2013	Hoop	
2013	Ball	"I Put A Spell On You" by Nina Simone
2013	Clubs	"Atardecer" by Josemi Carmona
2013	Ribbon	"Baluarte de los mártires" by Carles Benavent, Jorge Pardo, Manolo Carrasco, Tino di Geraldo / "Cómo se anda en el campo" by Jorge Pardo, Manolito Soler, Manolo Carrasco
2014	Hoop	"Mujer latina" by Thalía
2014	Ball	"Papa, Can You Hear Me?" by Itzhak Perlman
2014	Clubs	"Hit By a Brick" / "Lover Lies" / "Drink Drank Drunk" by The Atomic Fireballs
2014	Ribbon	
2015	Hoop	"Mujer latina" by Thalía
2015	Ball	"Papa, Can You Hear Me?" by Itzhak Perlman
2015	Clubs	"Hit By a Brick" / "Lover Lies" / "Drink Drank Drunk" by The Atomic Fireballs
2015	Ribbon	"Rise of the Instruments" / "The Storm" by Balázs Havasi
2016	Hoop	"The Christ Trilogy" by Balázs Havasi
2016	Ball	"Arte y compás" by Manolo Carrasco
2016	Clubs	"Partition" / "Ring the Alarm" / "Naughty Girl" / "Crazy in Love" by Beyoncé
2016	Ribbon	
2017	Hoop	
2017	Ball	"De frente" by Silvia Pérez Cruz
2017	Clubs	"Mongolia" by Armand Amar
2017	Ribbon	"Sand" by Nathan Lanier and Karen Whipple
