= Júlia Usón =

Spanish rhythmic gymnast

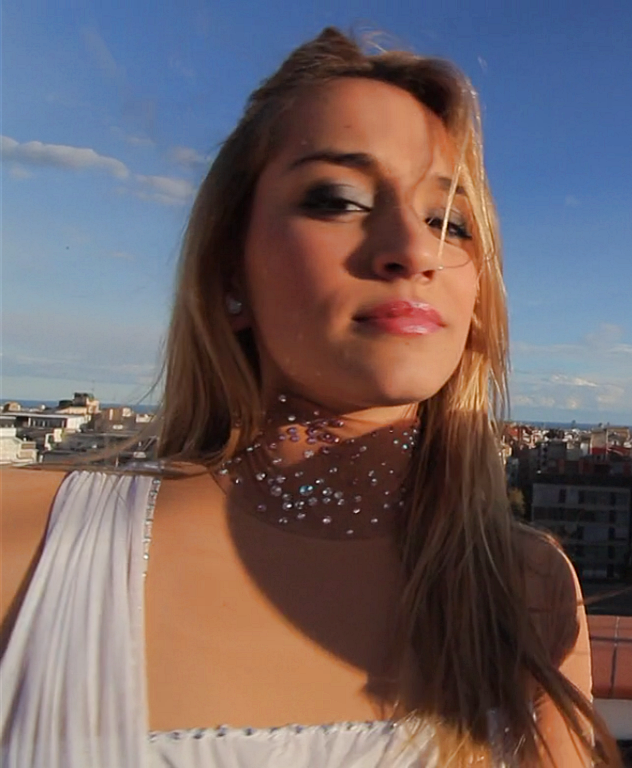

Personal information
- Full name: Júlia Usón Carvajal
- Born: 1 March 1994 (age 32) Cardedeu, Spain

Gymnastics career
- Discipline: Rhythmic gymnastics
- Country represented: Spain; (2008-2013)
- Club: Club Esportiu Vallesà de Rítmica Cardedeu / Club Rítmica Santfeliu / A.G.R. Catalunya / C.E.R. Mediterrania
- Head coach: Iratxe Aurrekoetxea
- Former coach: Noelia Fernández
- Retired: yes
Medal record
Representing Spain
Rhythmic Gymnastics
Gymnasiades
Bronze medal – third place	2009 Doha	Ball

Júlia Usón Carvajal (born 1 March 1994) is a retired Spanish rhythmic gymnast. She represented her country in international competitions.

== Biography ==
Júlia took up rhythmic gymnastics at the Club Esportiu Vallesà de Rítmica Cardedeu at 6 years of age. Shortly after she joined the Club Rítmica Santfeliu of San Feliú de Llobregat and in 2007 she began training in the high performance center (CAR) of Sant Cugat with Iratxe Aurrekoetxea as part of the A.G.R. Catalunya. In 2007 she was the Spanish individual and team champion in the children's category in Granada, with Raquel Calvo, Natalia García, Esther García and Julia Luna. She also participated in an exhibition at the Euskalgym in Durango in November. In 2008 she was asked to join the Spanish national junior team.

At the end of 2008 she entered the national junior group, training at the CAR in Madrid under Noelia Fernández. In 2009 the group achieved the 7th position overall and the 5th in the 5 ribbons final in the junior tournament in the World Cup of Portimão. In May Júlia, Lidon Ainhoa, Rebeca Garcia, Elena Lopez, Lourdes Mohedano and Janira Rodriguez were 5th at the European Championships in Baku.

In late 2009 she returned to the individual modality as part of the senior national team, although he returned to training in San Cugat. In November she participated in the Euskalgym, and in December she competed in the Gymnasiade in Doha, being 7th in the All-Around, 6th with rope 8th with clubs and won bronze with ball. In March 2010 she was champion of the Trofeo Internacional of Huelva, and in June, she won silver in the Spanish Championships in Zaragoza in the honor category, only being surpassed by Carolina Rodríguez. In August she participated in the World Cup in Pesaro alongside Natalia García and Marina Fernández, being 24th overall. In September she was selected for the World Championships in Moscow, where she took 14th place in teams (alongside Carolina Rodríguez, Natalia García and Marina Fernández) and 50th in the All-Around.

In 2011 she was crowned champion at the Madera International Tournament, also winning gold with hoop and clubs. In April she was again champion of the International Trophy of Huelva and won silver in the communities ranking in the Cup of the Queen in Valladolid. In May she competed in the Provincial Championships, where she won gold with ball, tape and clubs, and silver with hoop. Usón then competed in the European Championships in Minsk finishing 10th in teams along Natalia García. In June she participated in the international tournament No Limits Open of Antwerp, where she won gold in the All-Around and all equipment. In July she won bronze in the honor category at the Spanish Championships disputed in La Coruña, also winning silver with ball and bronze with clubs, hoop and ribbon. In September she participated in the World Championships in Montepellier, where she was 11th in the team category alongside Carolina Rodríguez and Natalia Garcia, and 43rd in the All-Around. In October she got gold in all apparatus at the II International Trophy Vitry Cup in Blanes, and in November participated in the Euskalgym.

At the beginning of 2012 she participated in national competitions such as the Catalan Cup, the Copa de la Reina or the Catalan Autonomous Championships. In July she won bronze at nationals, also obtaining gold with ribbon, silver with ball, and bronze with both hoop and clubs. In September 2012, together with two other gymnasts from A.G.R. Catalunya, Natalia García and Adelina Fominykh, she participated in the 2012 Aeon Cup in Tokyo, there was 21st overall and 8th in teams. Near the end of the year she competed in the 2nd division of serie A, the Italian club league, for Società Ginnastica Petrarca of Arezzo.

In April 2013, together with Natalia García, she published a video with the aim of seeking sponsors to be able to meet their sports expenses. Following this initiative, the company Crystal Maillots signed a sponsorship agreement with the Catalan Federation. That same month she suffered an injury which kept her from performing. On 18 June 2013 she was finally operated of compartment syndrome in the right leg, the injury that had been dragging and for which she could not compete at the European Championships in Vienna. From 31 August to 1 September 2013 she held a technification conference organized by the U.D San Roque club in Vilanova del Camí.

On 31 May 2014 she returned to competition by performing an exhibition in the Final Phase of the XX Barcelona-Comarques Trophy at Palau-solità i Plegamans. Although since November 2014 she started to train gymnasts in the Club Vallesà de Rítmica Cardedeu, Usón would continue competing until 2016, coming to participate with the C.E.R. Mediterrania in the Spanish Championships of 2015 in 1st category and 2016 in senior category, held in Pontevedra and Guadalajara respectively.

After her retirement she continued studying animation of physical and sports activities, and began working as a model. In 2018 she participated in several broadcasts of the reality and dating program Mujeres y hombres y viceversa of the channel Cuatro. Since 2015 the Club Rítmica Cel de Llinás del Vallés, where Júlia also works as a coach since 2016, helds the Trofeo Júlia Usón.
