= Sara Llana =

Spanish rhythmic gymnast

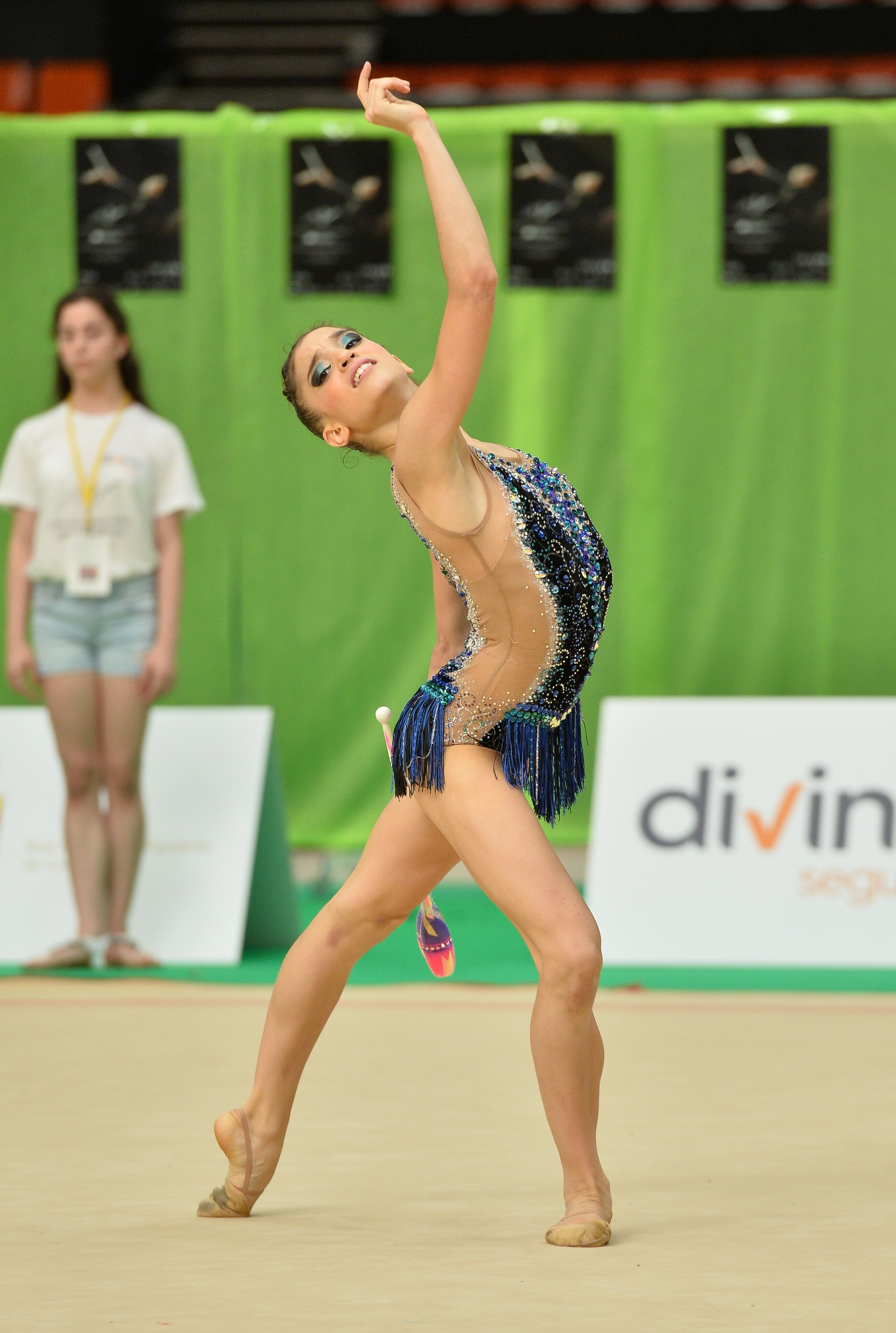

Personal information
- Full name: Sara Llana García
- Born: August 21, 1997 (age 29) León, Spain

Gymnastics career
- Discipline: Rhythmic gymnastics
- Country represented: Spain; (2014-2020)
- Club: Club Ritmo
- Head coach: Ruth Fernández Menéndez
- Assistant coach: Nuria Castaño
- Choreographer: Dagmara Brown
- Retired: yes

Sara Llana García (21 August 1997) is a Spanish rhythmic gymnast who competed in the national team. She has participated in four World Championships (Izmir 2014, Stuttgart 2015, Pesaro 2017 and Sofia 2018), and two Europeans (Nizhni Nóvgorod 2012 as a junior and Budapest 2017 as a senior), as well as being 4 times champion of Spain as an individual and 5 times with the group of Club Ritmo.

== Personal life ==
Sara took up gymnastics at age six after one of her friends asked her to try the sport. Her idol is Carolina Rodriguez who trained at the same club. She's now studying aerospace engineering at the University of Leon while helping with the coaching in Club Ritmo.

== Career ==
When Sara was 10 years old she entered the Club Ritmo, in 2008 she was part of the group and in 2009 she was an individual. She spent four and a half hours on the days she had school and on the days she didn't go to class she trained seven or eight hours.

=== Junior ===
In June 2012, at the age of 14, he participated in the European Championship as a junior, performing the club exercise. In addition, she previously participated in the Benidorm international tournament, where she was runner-up in teams, as well as silver medalist with clubs and bronze medalist with ball.

=== Senior ===
In 2013 she competed in the international Gymnasiada in Brasilia, in which she was ranked 4th in the All-Around, as well as with hoop, ball and ribbon. In 2014 she competed in the Holon Grand Prix finishing in 8th place and the Lisbon international tournament where she won gold with hoop ball, clubs and ribbon as well as in the All-Around. In autumn Sara was selected for the World Championships in Izmir, with Carolina Rodríguez and Natalia García, participating in hoop and ball. She was 6th in the team event, 58th with hoop and 74th with ball. In November she participated in the Euskalgym Vitoria.

In 2015 at the Holon Grand Prix she placed 4th with ball, ribbon, hoop and clubs, which earned her a 5th All-Around position. After winning bronze at the Spanish Championships behind Carolina Rodríguez and Natalia García, Llana participated in the Izmir International Tournament where he was 4th with hoop, ribbon, and the All-Around and won silver with clubs. In September Sara was selected for her second World Championships in Stuttgart, she performed only with clubs. At that time Sara was recovering from an injury to his left hand that conditioned part of his preparation for the season. She was 44th with clubs and 10th in the team category. In November she returned to participate in the Euskalgym.

Llana participated in the 2016 Grand Prix in Moscow where she was 22nd and then the MTM Ljubljana international tournament, where she placed 7th in the hoop final, 8th with ball and 6th with clubs, as well as 7th place in the All-Around. In October 2016 she performed at the Euskalgym.

In May 2017 Sara was selected for her first European Championship as a senior, in Budapest, achieving 12th place in teams along with Natalia García and Polina Berezina., the 22nd with hoop and clubs and the 36th with ball. In June, she won silver at the Spanish Championship held in Valencia, being surpassed by Polina Berezina. In August, together with her teammate Polina Berezina, she competed in her third World Championships, in Pesaro, where she was 40th overall, 32nd with hoop, 40th with ball, 64th with clubs and 31st with ribbon. In this competition she competed with a fracture in her left foot and dermatitis. In November she participated in the Euskalgym in Vitoria.

By March 2018 she ranked 45th overall at the Sofia World Cup. In May she participated in the World Cup in Guadalajara, being 22nd in the All-Around. In June Sara confirmed the silver medal at nationals, being surpassed again by Polina Berezina, in addition to winning gold clubs, hoop and ball, and silver with ribbon. In the Tarragona Mediterranean Games she was 7th in the All-Around. In mid-September she competed in the World Championships in Sofia. In it, she finished 17th in teams together with Polina Berezina, María Añó and Noa Ros, and the 62nd in the All-Around as well as 97th with hoop, 27th with ball, 64th with clubs and 73rd with ribbon. On December 1, she was proclaimed, together with her teammates from Club Ritmo, champion in the Final Phase of the 1st Division of the Iberdrola Club League, which was held in Cartagena.

In 2019 Sara took part in the World Cup in Baku finishing 44th in the All-Around. At nationals she was 7th behind Noa Ros, María Añó, Natalia García, Paola Serrano, Polina Berezina. At the Summer Universiade in Naples Sara was 12th in the All-Around and 6th in bot the hoop and clubs' finals.

On January 9, 2020, she announced through Instagram her retirement as a gymnast from the national team by her own decision, although she stated her intention to continue competing at the club level with Club Ritmo. Likewise, she reported that since November 25, 2019, she is part of the coaching staff of the national team in the CAR de León.

== Routine music information ==
Year	Apparatus	Music Title
2010-2012	Hoop	"Fandango for Elise" by Gustavo Montesano and the Royal Philharmonic Orchestra
2013	Hoop	"1917" by Mecano
2013	Ball	"The Journey" by Greg Maroney
2013	Clubs	
2013	Ribbon	"Because You Loved Me" by Céline Dion
2014	Hoop	"1917" by Mecano
2014	Ball	"The Journey" by Greg Maroney
2014	Clubs	"Gabriel's Oboe" by Yo-Yo Ma
2014	Ribbon	"Because You Loved Me" by Céline Dion
2015	Hoop	"La prima luce (In the Morning Light)" by Yanni
2015	Ball	"The Journey" by Greg Maroney
2015	Clubs	"Gabriel's Oboe" by Yo-Yo Ma
2015	Ribbon	"Song for Sara" by Greg Baker
2016	Hoop	"La prima luce (In the Morning Light)" by Yanni
2016	Ball	"The Journey" by Greg Maroney
2016	Clubs	"Brave Heart" by Jean-Philippe Rio-Py
2016	Ribbon	"Song for Sara" by Greg Baker
2017	Hoop	"La prima luce (In the Morning Light)" by Yanni
2017	Ball	"Image Without Reflection" by The Funk on Me
2017	Clubs	"Brave Heart" by Jean-Philippe Rio-Py
2017	Ribbon	"Song for Sara" by Greg Baker
2018	Hoop	"La prima luce (In the Morning Light)" by Yanni
2018	Ball	"Image Without Reflection" by The Funk on Me
2018	Clubs	"Skeletons" by Drehz/ "Axios", "Warthog", "K.I.A." by Nathan Lanier
2018	Ribbon	"The First Was a Death Woman" by Edo Notarloberti
