= Noa Ros =

Spanish rhythmic gymnast (born 2002)

- Full name: Noa Ros Esteller
- Born: 28 October 2002 (age 23) Les Coves de Vinromà, Spain

Gymnastics career
- Discipline: Rhythmic gymnastics
- Country represented: Spain (2016-2021)
- Club: Club Mabel
- Head coach: Alejandra Quereda
- Assistant coach: Blanca Lopez

Noa Ros (born 28 October 2002) is a retired Spanish rhythmic gymnast. She represented her country in international competitions and was national championship in 2019.

== Personal life ==
Noa took up rhythmic gymnastics after a holiday at a campsite in Switzerland with her parents, “there were some guys who were practising gymnastics and I was so impressed that I tried to see if I was able to do all the amazing things they did." After returning home her mother enrolled her to classes at the local Mabel Club. Her dream was to participate in the Olympic Games like her idol, Bulgarian rhythmic gymnast Boryana Kaleyn. In 2018 she was named Best Gymnast by the Sports Press Association of Castellon.

== Career ==
She debuted internationally at the 2016 European Championships in Holon, where she performed with rope and clubs, finishing 23rd and 44th with the two apparatuses as well as 14th in the team competition. In 2017 she became Spain's national junior champion.

Ros made her senior debut at the 2018 World Championships in Sofia where she performed with ball, finishing 41st and 17th in the team competitions.

In 2019 Noa took part in two World Cups: Pesaro where she was 22nd in the All-Around, 33rd with hoop, 20th with ball, 16th with clubs and 35th with ribbon, and Kazan finishing 22nd in the All-Around, 13th with hoop, 13th with ball, 29th with clubs and 31st with ribbon

She was selected for the 2019 European Championships in Baku, but she suffered a stress fracture in her right heel and was replaced by Polina Berezina. After her return to competition she won gold at the Spanish Championship in Palma de Maillorca.

In 2020 she competed at the Grand-Prix in Moscow, finishing 20th. A few days later, the COVID-19 pandemic broke out, completely paralysing the world, and months later, Noa was the victim of a serious hip injury that forced her to undergo surgery at the beginning of December. Her tortuous journey ended in October 2021 with her presence at the Marbella Grand Prix taking the 10th place.

In 2022 she was diagnosed with radiculopathy, a condition in which one or more nerves are affected and do not work properly, and had to retire from rhythmic gymnastics to focus on physical rehabilitation.
