= Marina Fernandez (gymnast) =

Spanish rhythmic gymnast, cheerleader and model

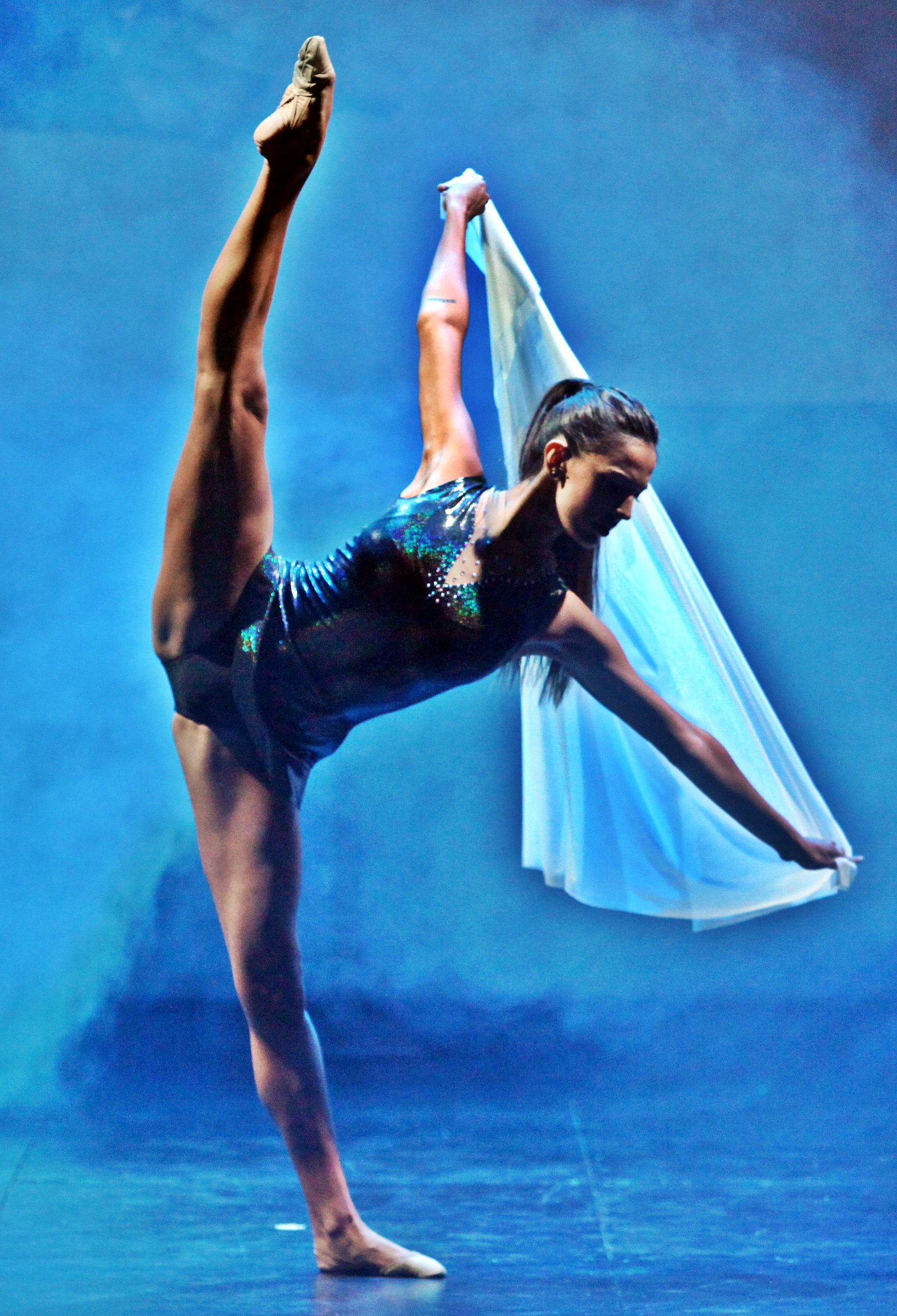

Personal information
- Full name: Marina Fernandez Moreno
- Born: 9 May 1992 (age 34) Sabadell, Spain

Gymnastics career
- Discipline: Rhythmic gymnastics
- Country represented: Spain (2009-2013)
- Club: Club Muntanyenc Sant Cugat
- Head coach: Anna Baranova
- Assistant coach: Sara Bayón
- Former coach: Iratxe Aurrekoetxea
- Retired: yes
Medal record
Rhythmic Gymnastics
Representing Spain
Event	1st	2nd	3rd
FIG World Cup	1	1	2
Total	1	1	2

Marina Fernandez Moreno (born 9 May 1992) is a retired Spanish rhythmic gymnast, cheerleader and model.

== Biography ==
Marina took up rhythmic gymnastics at the age of 6, and it was at 11 when she joined the Catalan team at the Sant Cugat del Vallés High Performance Center. During her time as an individual gymnast she was trained by Iratxe Aurrekoetxea, medalling at the Spanish Championships for 8 consecutive years.

In 2009 she entered the Spanish national team, she was then called up to competed at the European Championships in Baku where she took 10th place in teams, with Carolina Rodriguez, and 24th in the All-Around. In September she was selected for the 2009 World Championships in Mie, finishing 44th in the All-Around, 47th with rope, 40th with hoop, 44th with ball and 61st with ribbon. The following year she competed again at the 2010 World Championships in Moscow, she was 17th in teams, 69th in the All-Around, 68th with rope, 66th with hoop, 66th with ribbon and 14th in teams.

In October 2011, Marina moved to Madrid and joined, first as a substitute gymnast, the senior group under the command of Sara Bayón and Anna Baranova. In November 2012 she participated with her teammates in an exhibition at the Euskalgym. In 2013 she began to be a starter in the group in the exercise of 3 balls and 2 ribbons. That year the group premiered new exercises with both the 10 clubs and the mixed one. The first used "A blindas" by Miguel Poveda as music, and the second used the songs "Still", "Big Palooka" and "Jive and Jump" by The Jive Aces. Marina debuted with the group at the Thiais Grand Prix, where Spain won bronze overall, silver with 10 clubs and were 4th in the 3 balls and 2 ribbons final. At that time the team was also made up of Sandra Aguilar, Artemi Gavezou, Lourdes Mohedano, Alejandra Quereda, Lidia Redondo, Elena López and substitute Loreto Achaerandio. In April of that year, in the World Cup event held in Lisbon, the group won the gold medal in the All-Around and the bronze medal with 3 balls and 2 ribbons. They later won a silver medal with 10 clubs at the Sofia World Cup event and a bronze medal in the All-Around at the World Cup in Saint Petersburg.

Marina left the group by her own decision in August 2013, a few days before the World Championships in Kyiv, after being informed that she was being removed from the group. According to Marina's version, after informing her in Saint Petersburg that she would not be a starter in the World Championships, the selector and coach asked her to fake an injury so that she could be in Kyiv without the obligation to compete (since a rule of The FIG requires that all gymnasts registered in each championship have to compete in it unless there is an injury), which she refused. This version differs from that of the national team, which stated on the contrary that after the World Cup in Saint Petersburg they informed Marina that she was not going to be a starter at Worlds and therefore would not travel to Ukraine. The decision of the team's coaching staff to leave her out of World Championships preparation led Marina to decide to leave the group and later retire.

After she ended her sport career she became part of the cheerleaders of FC Barcelona, known as Dream Cheers, also working as a trainer in their academy. She also graduated from the Autonomous University of Barcelona with a law degree.

On September 1, 2018, she was elected Miss World Barcelona, so she was a candidate to be Miss World Spain on September 15, 2018, in Rota. At the Miss World Ella Spain Gala she managed, among other honors, to enter the Top 15 and the Best Talent award.

In April 2019, it was announced she was part of the Ciudadanos list as number 5 for the Barcelona city council of Sabadell in the 2019 municipal elections.
