= Esther Escolar =

Spanish former rhythmic and aesthetic gymnast

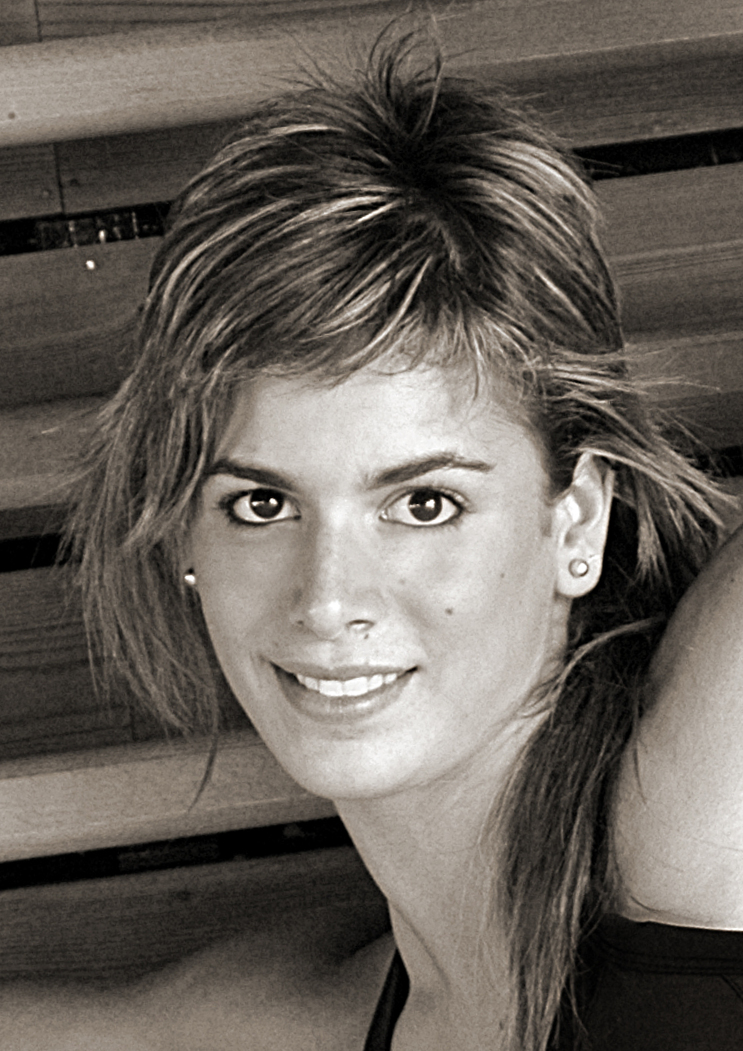

Personal information
- Full name: Esther Escolar Menéndez
- Born: 21 December 1987 (age 38) Lérida, Spain

Gymnastics career
- Discipline: Rhythmic Gymnastics, Aesthetic group gymnastics
- Country represented: Spain (2003-2008)
- Club: Club Patricia / Club Alcón Cusí
- Head coach: Iratxe Aurrekoetxea
- Retired: yes

Esther Escolar Menéndez (born 21 December 1987) is a Spanish former rhythmic and aesthetic gymnast. She represented her country in international competitions.

== Biography ==
Esther took up rhythmic gymnastics around 1994 at age 7, as an extracurricular activity at the Colegio Capitán Masip. She then moved to the Club Patricia of Lleida, where she was trained by Divina Abad and later by Meri Torrelles.

Since 1997, Esther began competing in national competitions, winning gold in the Spanish Group Championships in 1999. That same year she was called up for a stage in the Spanish national team. As an individual, in 2000 she became national junior champion in Córdoba, in 2002 she was runner-up. In 2003 she was crowned champion of Spain in the 1st category of the Individual Championships, also achieving gold with clubs and with ribbon. In 2004 she won silver in the honour category in Alicante, and bronze at the 2005 Spanish Championships in Benicarló.

In 2003 she entered the Spanish national team, training in the CAR of Sant Cugat del Vallés under Iratxe Aurrekoetxea and Tania Muller. That same year, along with Almudena Cid, Jennifer Colino and Carolina Rodríguez, she was 6th in teams at the World Championship in Budapest, she was also 122nd in the All-Around as she competed with ball.

In June 2005 she placed 6th in teams, with Almudena Cid and Jennifer Colino, at the European Championships in Moscow. The month she participated in the Mediterranean Games in Almería, ending in 5th place in qualifying, although she could not participate in the final because of the two gymnast per country rule. In October she was selected for the World Championships in Baku where she took 6th place in teams, along Almudena Cid, Jennifer Colino and Carolina Rodríguez, and 42nd in the All-Around having competed 3 out of 4 routines.

In 2007, as she was recovering from an injury, she participated in an exhibition at the First International Cup of Catalonia held in Lleida. For 2008 she competed in the International No Limits Open Tournament in Antwerp, in which she was chosen as Miss Elegance.

After retiring from rhythmic gymnastics in 2008 due to a knee injury, she went on to help Iratxe Aurrekoetxea as a coach. In the beginnings of 2009 she started practicing aesthetic gymnastics by joining the Club Alcon Cusí, with which she has been 5 times champion of Spain. Esther participated in several international competitions, being 10th at the World Cup in Vigo in 2011, 10th at the 2011 World Championships in Tartu, 8th at the World Cup in Vantaa in 2012, 8th at the 2012 World Championships in Cartagena, 7th at the Barcelona World Cup in 2013, 8th at the 2013 World Championships in Lahti, 8th at the Cartagena World Cup in 2013, or 6th at the Tartu World Cup in 2014.

Since 10 May 2009 she participated as a gymnast in the play La danza de los dos pianos, directed by Manel Martín and with the presence of the also former international gymnast Montse Martín. In 2012 Esther graduated in primary education teaching at the Autonomous University of Barcelona, specializing in physical education, and in 2014 she did a Master in psychopedagogy at the International University of La Rioja.

She holds the title of national coach of rhythmic gymnastics, currently training the Sant Cugat Gymnastics Club, in which she trained gymnasts like Clara Esquerdo. In addition, she is a component of the educational project Eduvic - Inspire your country.
