= Montse Manzanares =

Spanish rhythmic gymnast

Montserrat Manzanares
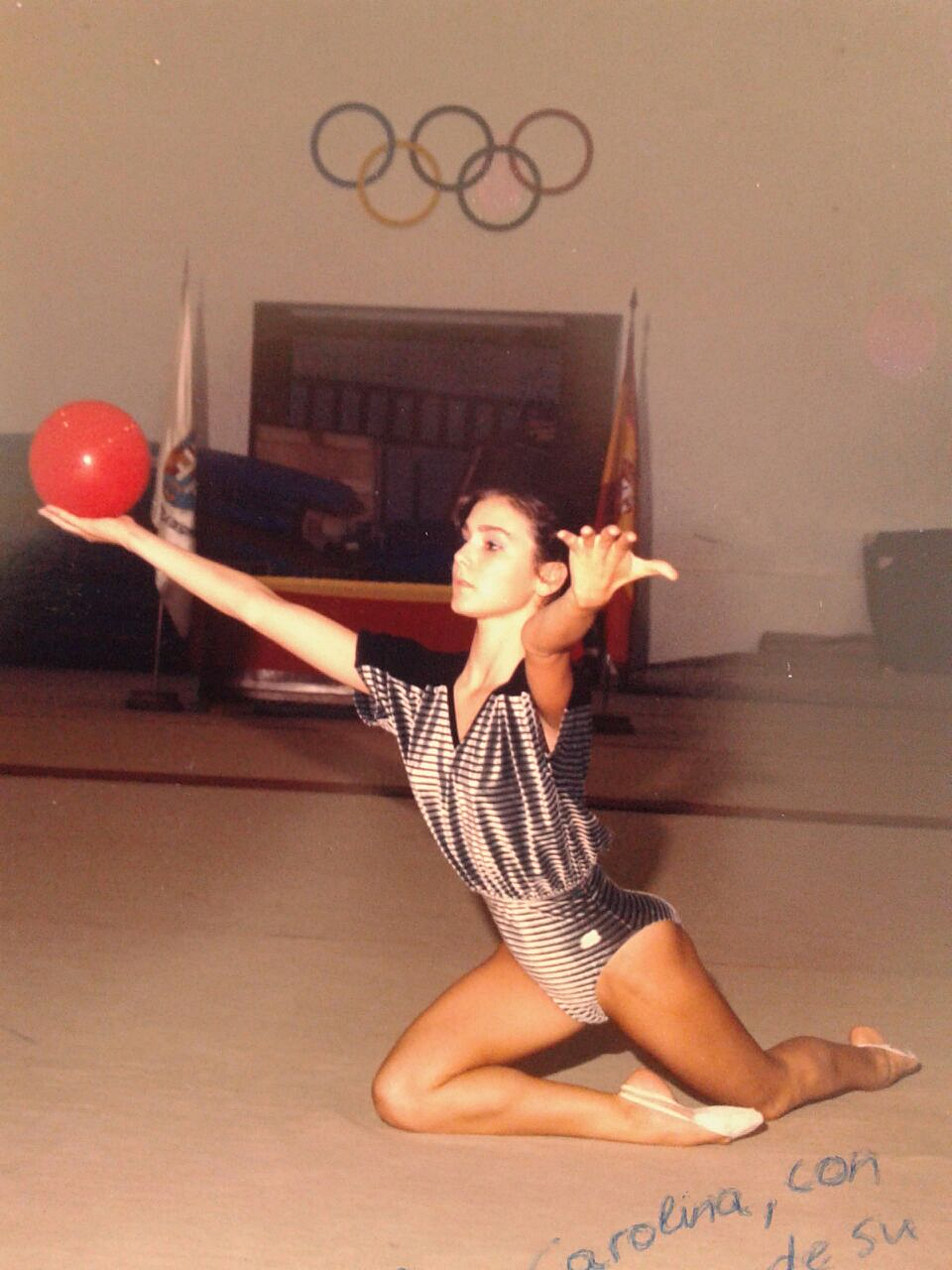

Personal information
- Full name: Montserrat Manzanares Colino
- Nickname: Montse
- Born: 2 February 1970 (age 56) Madrid, Spain

Gymnastics career
- Discipline: Rhythmic gymnastics
- Country represented: Spain (1984-1989)
- Club: Club Gimnasio Moscardó
- Head coach: Emilia Boneva
- Retired: yes

Montserrat Manzanares Colino (born 2 February 1970), known as Montse Manzanares, is a retired Spanish rhythmic gymnast. She was national champion in 1986.

== Career ==
Montse took up rhythmic gymnastics in 1979, when she was 9 years old, at the Moscardó Gymnasium in Madrid. In 1982 she achieved 4th place in the All-Around in the 2nd category in the Spanish Championship, held that year in Palencia. The following year she won silver in the All-Around of the 1st category at nationals in Malaga. In June of that same year she participated in the Sofia Golden Ring tournament, placing 7th. In 1984 she achieved 4th place in the individual All-Around in the honor category at the Spanish Championships, held in Madrid.

Around 1984, at the age of 14, she joined the Spanish national team as an individual, training at the Moscardó Gymnasium under the orders of the national team coach Emilia Boneva. In November of the same year she was selected as a substitute for the European Championship in Vienna.

In 1985 she was 14th in the International City of Barcelona Cup and in May, 41st in the Corbeil-Essonnes International and 13th in the Julieta Shishmanova tournament, then she competed in her maiden World Championships in Valladolid, replacing Marta Bobo, taking 17th place in the All-Around.

At the 1986 Spanish Championships she was crowned national champion ahead of María Martín and Nuria Salido. Montse competed at the inaugural Goodwill Games in Moscow in 1986, finishing 13th. She also took part in the World Cup Final in Tokyo where she took 18th place. That year she was labelled "the main representative of the new wave of Spanish rhythmic gymnastics, who has taken over from the legendary Martas [the gymnasts Marta Bobo and Marta Cantón]." by journalist Manuel Frías.

By April 1987 she was 10th in the Wiesbaden tournament, and in May, 11th at the Julieta Shishmanova tournament, 22nd in the Corbeil-Essonnes International. At the World Championships in Varna she got 28th place in the All-Around.

She retired in 1987, at 17. After studying law, in 1991, she joined the Las Rozas de Madrid City Council to work as a rhythmic gymnastics trainer at the Municipal School, mainly teaching the basics of this sport. Currently she continues to coach and in addition, she teaches gymnastics to people over 65 years of age.

After Emilia Boneva's death on 20 September 2019, Lourdes and other former national gymnasts gathered to pay tribute to her during the Euskalgym held on 16 November 2019, the event took place before 8,500 attendees at the Bilbao Exhibition Center de Baracaldo and was followed by a dinner in her honor.
