= Jennifer Colino =

Spanish rhythmic gymnast and coach

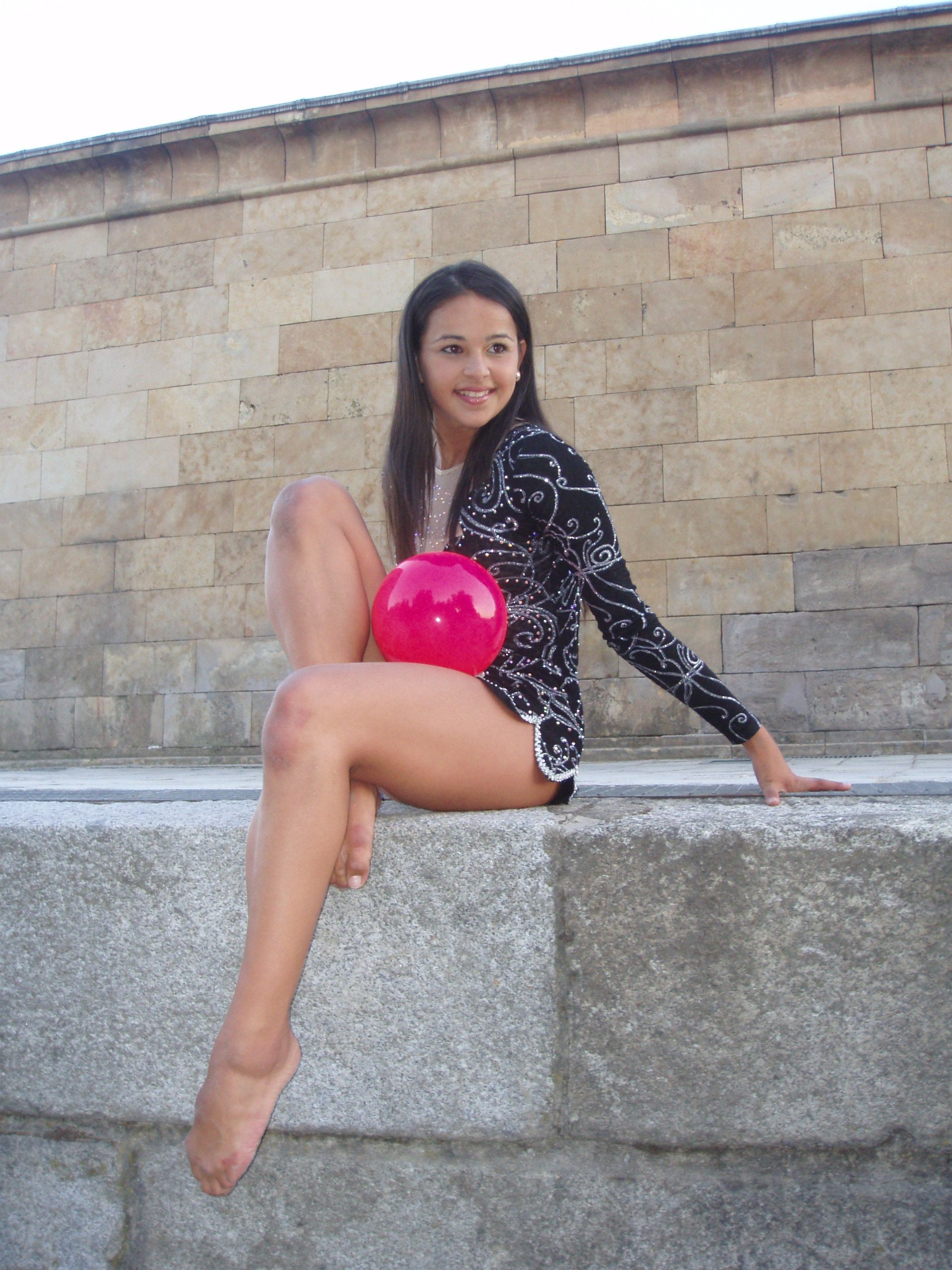

Personal information
- Full name: Jennifer Colino Guerra
- Born: 11 October 1985 (age 40) Torrevieja, Spain
- Height: 161 cm (5 ft 3 in)

Gymnastics career
- Discipline: Rhythmic gymnastics
- Country represented: Spain (2001-2007)
- Club: Club Gimnasia Rítmica Torrevieja / Club Atlético Montemar
- Head coach: Nina Vitrichenko
- Retired: yes

Jennifer Colino Guerra (born 11 October 1985) is a retired Spanish rhythmic gymnast and coach. As part of the Club Atlético Montemar she is a multiple national champion.

== Biography ==
At the age of 5, she began practicing ballet, flamenco and Spanish dance, at the age of 8 she started rhythmic gymnastics as part of the school's extracurricular activities. She started at the Club Gimnasia Rítmica Torrevieja, moving 2 years later to the Club Atlético Montemar in Alicante, a club from which other important Spanish gymnasts such as Carolina Pascual, Marta Baldó and Estela Giménez have emerged.

In 1996 she was regional champion in the children's category in the individual modality and Spanish champion in the children's category in the group modality with the Club Atlético Montemar. In 1997 she was the national junior champion with ball and in 1998 she was the junior Spanish champion in both individuals and groups. In 1999 she won among the juniors with ribbon and ball, that year she also won bronze at the Spanish group championships in Valladolid (a group then also made up of three other future gymnasts from the national team such as Isabel Pagán, Marta Linares and Laura Devesa, as well as by Ana Marqueño). In 2000 she was Spanish champion in the senior category with both rope and hoop.

In 2001 she became part of the Spanish national team after being called by coach Nina Vitrichenko. That same year she won the Spanish Cup. In October, at the World Championships in Madrid, after the disqualification of Alina Kabaeva and Irina Tchachina, she was 4th in teams along with Almudena Cid and Carolina Rodríguez and 13th in the All-Around.

In November 2002, she competed in the European Championships in Granada, finishing 5th in teams with Almudena Cid and 10th place in the All-Around. In 2003, at the World Championships in Budapest, she took 6th place in teams with Almudena Cid, Carolina Rodríguez and Esther Escolar, an 11th place in the All-Around. In this competition, the Spanish team only managed to qualify for a place for the 2004 Athens Olympic Games.

The Spanish Gymnastics Federation decided that Jennifer and Almudena would compete against each other for a place in the Olympic Games. To do this, it arbitrated a classification system that would grant the Olympic place, which was made up of four internal controls and four international competitions. This decision did not please those around either of the two gymnasts, since it forced them to compete to the maximum in the months prior to the Games, making them suffer greater physical and mental wear and tear, and increasing the risk of injury. Almudena would declare that the system had forgotten her extensive career, and Colino said that she thought there was favoritism towards Cid. After obtaining a higher score in the classification system, Almudena Cid finally made it to Athens.

In 2003 and 2004 Colino was Spanish champion in the honor category. In May 2004 she was 6th in the All-Around 7th with hoop, 6th with ball, 7th with clubs and 8th with ribbon at the World Cup in Baku, at the European Championships in Kyiv she placed 5th in teams with Almudena Cid, also being 16th in the All-Around. A year later, at the European Championships in Moscow, she placed 6th in teams with Almudena Cid and Esther Escolar. That same month he competed in the 2005 Mediterranean Games in Almería, where she took 5th place in the final. In September she was champion of the Mercedes-Benz Cup in Berlin, a qualifying event for the general competition of the Berlin Masters (last Grand Prix tournament 2005), in which she was finally 16th overall and 8th in the ribbon final.

In October 2005, at the World Championships in Baku she was ranked 17th in the All-Around and, together with Almudena Cid, Carolina Rodríguez and Esther Escolar, 6th in teams. In September 2006 she was 12th overall at the European Championships in Moscow. In March 2007, the worsening of a back injury that she had had since 2003 caused the Federation's technical team to urge her to stop training, although she would continue training independently.

In February 2008 Jennifer retired due to the aggravation of the back injury she had suffered since 2003. In announcing her retirement, she publicly criticized the Spanish federation and Club Atlético Montemar for the treatment she received, and the services RFEG doctors for not detecting the severity of her injury earlier, although she also noted that in the last year they advised her to stop training and she did not do so because she wanted to be in the Olympic Games.

After her retirement she coached at the Club Gimnasia Rítmica Torrevieja for several years, where she coincided on the technical team with other former gymnasts such as Mari Carmen Moreno or Mónica Ferrández. In October 2015 she announced the creation of her own rhythmic gymnastics club, the Jennifer Colino Club, based in Torrevieja, which she currently coaches.
