= Cristina Korniychuk =

Spanish rhythmic gymnast (born 2005)

- Korniychuk in 2024

Personal information
- Born: 28 April 2005 (age 21) Alcalá de Henares, Spain

Gymnastics career
- Discipline: Rhythmic gymnastics
- Country represented: Spain; (2020-2026)
- Club: Club Distrito III
- Retired: yes
Medal record
Rhythmic Gymnastics
Representing Spain
Event	1st	2nd	3rd
Grand Prix Finals	0	0	1
Total	0	0	1

Cristina Korniychuk (born 28 April 2005) is a retired Spanish rhythmic gymnast of Ukrainian descent. She represented Spain in international competitions.

== Career ==
=== Junior ===
In December 2020 Korniychuk won silver with rope and bronze with ribbon at the Spanish Championships, being the only gymnast from the Madrid area to enter the national team.

=== Senior ===
She became age eligible for senior competitions in 2021. In April 2022 she made her international senior debut at the World Cup in Baku, there she was 19th in the All-Around, 22nd with hoop, 22nd with ball, 18th with clubs and 22nd with ribbon.

She competed at the 2023 World Challenge Cup in Portimão, being 18th in the All-Around, 14th with hoop, 7th with ball, 25th with clubs and 37th with ribbon. At the Spanish Championships she won bronze medal in all-around behind Alba Bautista and Polina Berezina, also taking silver with hoop and bronze in ball, clubs and ribbon.

In March 2024 it was announced she was to take part in the Grand Prix in Thiais, being 14th in all-around and 6th in the ball final. The following month she competed in the World Cup in Sofia, taking 25th place in the All-Around, 27th with hoop, 34th with ball, 16th with clubs and 18th with ribbon. In May she was selected for the maiden edition of the European Cup, finishing in 20th place. In June she won bronze with clubs at the Grand Prix in Brno. Later she won again the bronze medal in all-around behind Alba Bautista and Polina Berezina at Spanish National Championship in Avilés. Later she was confirmed into the national team.

In March 2025 she took 15th place at the Grand Prix in Marbella. The following month she won bronze in the All-Around at the Ourense International Tournament. In May she took part in the Gdynia Rhythmic Stars tournament.

At the 2026 Thiais Grand Prix she was 17th in all-around. In May she competed at the 2026 European Cup in Baku, being 22nd in the preliminary All-Around round. At the World Challenge Cup in Cluj-Napoca, ending on 24th place in the All-Around. In September she was confirmed into the national team.

In October, she announced her retirement from sport.

== Routine music information ==
Year	Apparatus	Music title
2026	Hoop	I'll Never Love Again (from A Star Is Born) by Lady Gaga
2026	Ball	The Crowned Pawn by X-Ray Dog
2026	Clubs	Sax by Fleur East
2026	Ribbon	Workin' Day and Night (Immortal Version) by Michael Jackson
