= Spanish Rhythmic Gymnastics Championships =

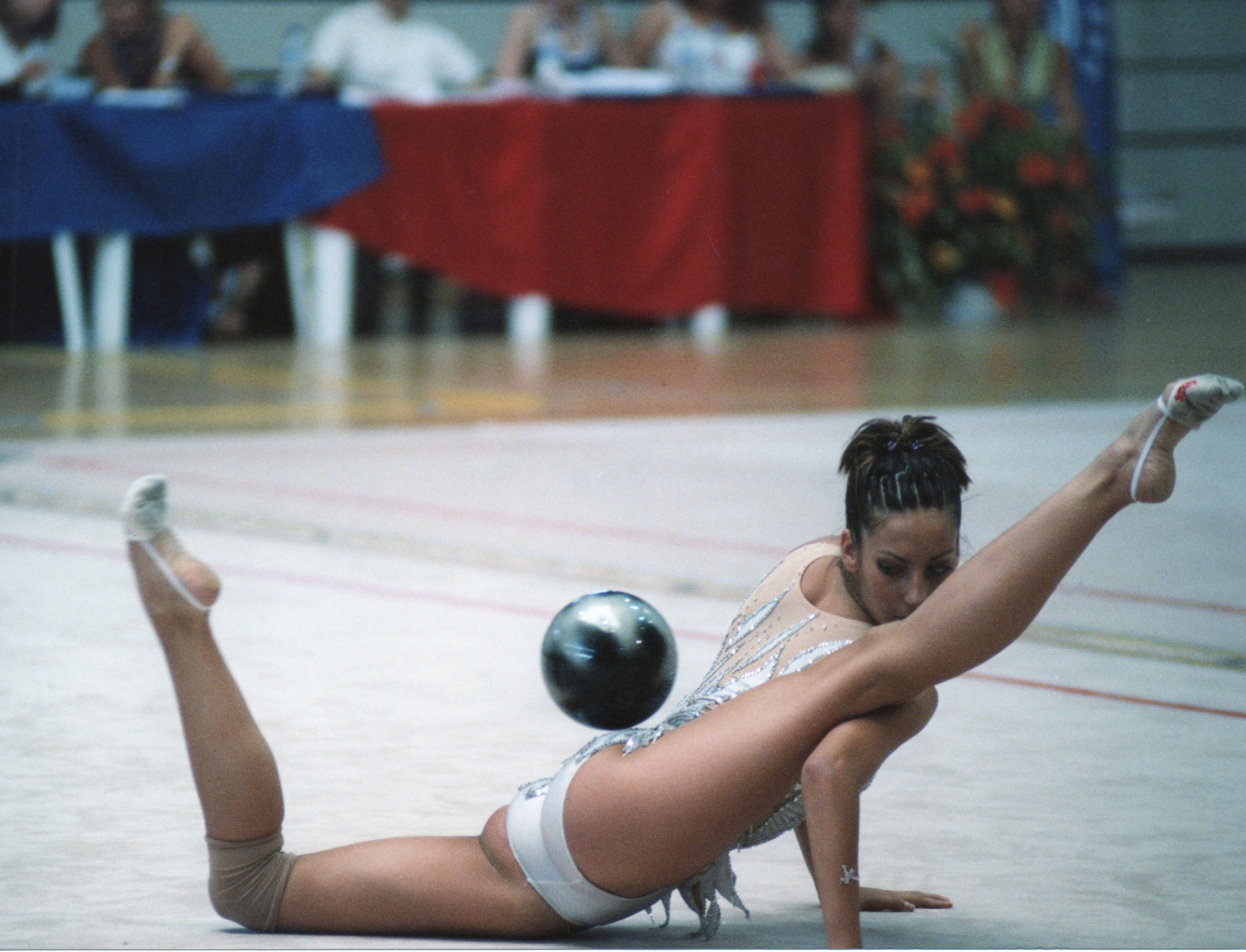
Almudena Cid at the 2002 Spanish Individual Championship, held in Leganés.

The Spanish Rhythmic Gymnastics Championship is the most important national rhythmic gymnastics competition in Spain. It is organized annually since 1975 by the Royal Spanish Federation of Gymnastics and today, since 2010, it is called the Spanish Championship of Individuals, Clubs and Autonomies. It is currently held in June and alongside the Spanish Men's Individual Championship.

== History ==
The first two editions took place at the same time as the Spanish Group Championship and mid-year, going from 1977 to 1985 they were held independently and in December. The first edition took place at the Moscardó Gymnasium in Madrid at the end of April 1975. Since 1986 it's held mid-year, usually in June. In this first national event was proclaimed champion Begoña Blasco, while María Jesús Alegre and África Blesa shared the second place. María Jesús Alegre would be the champion in the next two editions.

Carolina Rodríguez is the most decorated gymnast in all categories, with 12 titles (1 in newbies, 1 in children, 1 in 1st category and 9 in honour). She is also the gymnast who has been the most times champion of Spain in the general competition of the honour category, with 9 titles.

== Categories ==
Different categories are used depending on the age of gymnasts when the competition is held. These categories are Benjamin (youngsters) 8 – 9, Alevín (newbie) 10 – 11, Infantil (pre-junior) 12 – 13, Junior 14 – 15 and Senior for those 16 years and over. In addition, in the Spanish Championship is also divided in: 1st category (where gymnasts who had belonged to the team for more than 2 years, winners in the same category the year before, and at least top 3 ranked the year before in junior and senior category compete), the Junior Honor and the Senior Honor (where gymnasts from the national team participate). During the championship, within each of these categories both the All-Around and apparatus finals are scheduled. In addition, there is classification by clubs and autonomies.

== List of champions ==
Year	Location	Gold	Silver	Bronze
Single category
1975	Madrid	Begoña Blasco (Madrid)	María Jesús Alegre (Club Cuartel de la Montaña de Madrid) / África Blesa (Madrid)	none awarded
1st category
1976	Madrid	María Jesús Alegre (Club Cuartel de la Montaña de Madrid)	Begoña Blasco (Madrid)	África Blesa (Madrid)
1977	Gijón	María Jesús Alegre (Club Cuartel de la Montaña de Madrid)	Begoña Blasco (Madrid)	Susana Mendizábal (Madrid)
1978	Valladolid	Susana Mendizábal (Madrid)	Sonia Conde (Valladolid)	Sonia Moreno (Madrid)
1979	Madrid	Sonia Conde (Valladolid)	Susana Mendizábal (Madrid)	Sonia Moreno (Madrid)
1980	Alicante	Sonia Conde (Valladolid)	Eva Alcaraz (Madrid)	Susana Guillén (Madrid)
1981	Pamplona	Marta Bobo (Club 2000 of Orense)	Susana Guillén (Madrid)	Eva Alcaraz (Madrid) / Sonia Conde (Valladolid)
1982	Palencia	Marta Cantón (E.G.R. of Barcelona)	Pino Díaz (Club 2000 de Orense)	Eva Alcaraz (Madrid)
Honour category
1983	Málaga	Marta Bobo (Club 2000 of Orense)	Marta Cantón (E.G.R. of Barcelona)	Lourdes Osuna (Club Moscardó of Madrid)
1984	Madrid	Marta Cantón (E.G.R. of Barcelona)	Lourdes Osuna (Club Moscardó of Madrid)	Marta Bobo (Club 2000 of Orense)
1985	Cádiz	Nuria Salido (Club Atlético Montemar of Alicante)	Montse Manzanares (Club Moscardó of Madrid)	María Martín (Club Moscardó of Madrid)
1986	Orense	Montse Manzanares (Club Moscardó of Madrid)	María Martín (Club Moscardó of Madrid)	Nuria Salido (Club Atlético Montemar of Alicante)
1987	Palma de Mallorca	María Martín (Club Moscardó of Madrid)	Maisa Lloret (Club Atlético Montemar of Alicante)	Ana Bautista (Escuela Municipal de Santa Cruz of Tenerife)
1988	Lloret de Mar	María Martín (Club Moscardó of Madrid)	Maisa Lloret (Club Atlético Montemar of Alicante)	
1989	Murcia	Ana Bautista (Escuela Municipal de Santa Cruz of Tenerife)	Silvia Yustos (E.T.G. of Valladolid)	Eva Jiménez (Club Moscardó of Madrid)
1990	Guadalajara	Ada Liberio (Club Deportivo Zaragozano de Gimnasia of Zaragoza)	Noelia Fernández (Club Atlético Montemar of Alicante)	Mónica Ferrández (Club Atlético Montemar of Alicante)
1991	Torrevieja	Carolina Pascual (Club Atlético Montemar of Alicante)	Mónica Ferrández (Club Atlético Montemar of Alicante)	Carolina Borrell (Escuela de Competición of Murcia)
1992	San Sebastián	Rosabel Espinosa (Club ECA of Alicante) / Noelia Fernández (Club Atlético Montemar of Alicante)	none awarded	Carolina Pascual (Club Atlético Montemar of Alicante)
1993	Valladolid	Carmen Acedo (Club Patricia of Lérida)	Noelia Fernández (Club Atlético Montemar of Alicante)	Carolina Pascual (Club Atlético Montemar of Alicante) / Susana Gómez (independent)
1994	Valladolid	Susana Gómez (independent)	Marta Baldó (Club Atlético Montemar of Alicante)	Amaya Cardeñoso (independent)
1995	Alicante	Almudena Cid (Club Aurrera of Vitoria-Gasteiz)	Claudia Pérez (Escuela de Gimnasia Cepsa-Tenerife de Santa Cruz of Tenerife)	Nuria Cabanillas (Club Gimnasia Badajoz of Badajoz)
1996	Santa Cruz de Tenerife	Almudena Cid (Club Aurrera of Vitoria-Gasteiz)	Alba Caride (Club Vallisoletano of Valladolid)	Esther Domínguez (C.E.G.R. Zaragoza of Zaragoza)
1997	Valladolid	Alba Caride (Club Vallisoletano of Valladolid)	Esther Domínguez (C.E.G.R. Zaragoza of Zaragoza)	Almudena Cid (Club Aurrera of Vitoria-Gasteiz)
1998	Reus	Esther Domínguez (C.E.G.R. Zaragoza of Zaragoza)	Alba Caride (Club Vallisoletano of Valladolid)	Almudena Cid (Club Aurrera of Vitoria-Gasteiz)
1999	Leganés	Esther Domínguez (C.E.G.R. Zaragoza of Zaragoza) / Almudena Cid (Club Aurrera of Vitoria-Gasteiz)	none awarded	Alba Caride (Club Vallisoletano of Valladolid)
2000	Córdoba	Esther Domínguez (C.E.G.R. Zaragoza of Zaragoza)	Almudena Cid (Club Aurrera of Vitoria-Gasteiz)	Alba Caride (Club Vallisoletano of Valladolid)
2001	Valencia	Almudena Cid (independent)	none awarded	none awarded
2002	Leganés	Almudena Cid (independent)	Jennifer Colino (Club Atlético Montemar of Alicante)	Carolina Rodríguez (Club Ritmo of León)
2003	Córdoba	Jennifer Colino (Club Atlético Montemar of Alicante)	none awarded	none awarded
2004	Alicante	Jennifer Colino (Club Atlético Montemar of Alicante)	Esther Escolar (Club Patricia of Lérida)	none awarded
2005	Benicarló	Almudena Cid (independent)	Jennifer Colino (Club Atlético Montemar of Alicante)	Esther Escolar (Club Patricia of Lérida)
2006	León	Carolina Rodríguez (Club Ritmo of León)	Jennifer Colino (Club Atlético Montemar of Alicante)	Almudena Cid (independent)
2007	Logroño	Almudena Cid (independent)	Carolina Rodríguez (Club Ritmo of León)	Loreto Achaerandio (Club Gimnasia Rítmica Móstoles of Móstoles)
2008	Ponferrada	Almudena Cid (independent)	Nuria Artigues (Sícoris Club of Lérida)	Loreto Achaerandio (Club Gimnasia Rítmica Móstoles of Móstoles)
2009	Ponferrada	Carolina Rodríguez (Club Ritmo of León)	Marina Fernández (Club Muntanyenc Sant Cugat of San Cugat del Vallés)	none awarded
2010	Zaragoza	Carolina Rodríguez (Club Ritmo of León)	Júlia Usón (Club Rítmica Santfeliu of San Feliú de Llobregat)	Marina Fernández (Club Muntanyenc Sant Cugat of San Cugat del Vallés)
2011	La Coruña	Carolina Rodríguez (Club Ritmo of León)	Natalia García (Club Rítmica Penedès of Vilafranca del Penedès)	Júlia Usón (Club Rítmica Santfeliu of San Feliú de Llobregat)
2012	Valladolid	Carolina Rodríguez (Club Ritmo of León)	Natalia García (Club Rítmica Penedès of Vilafranca del Penedès)	Júlia Usón (Club Rítmica Santfeliu of San Feliú de Llobregat)
2013	Valladolid	Carolina Rodríguez (Club Ritmo of León)	Natalia García (Club Rítmica Penedès of Vilafranca del Penedès)	Eugenia Onopko (Asociación Deportiva Omega of Oviedo)
2014	Granada	Carolina Rodríguez (Club Ritmo of León)	Natalia García (Club Rítmica Penedès of Vilafranca del Penedès)	Eugenia Onopko (Asociación Deportiva Omega of Oviedo)
2015	Pontevedra	Carolina Rodríguez (Club Ritmo of León)	Natalia García (Club Rítmica Penedès of Vilafranca del Penedès)	Sara Llana (Club Ritmo of León)
2016	Guadalajara	Carolina Rodríguez (Club Ritmo of León)	Natalia García (Club Rítmica Penedès of Vilafranca del Penedès)	Sara Llana (Club Ritmo of León)
2017	Valencia	Polina Berezina (Club Torrevieja of Torrevieja)	Sara Llana (Club Ritmo of León)	none awarded
2018	Guadalajara	Polina Berezina (Club Torrevieja of Torrevieja)	Sara Llana (Club Ritmo of León)	none awarded
2019	Palma de Mallorca	Noa Ros (Club Mabel of Benicarló)	María Añó (Club Mabel of Benicarló)	Natalia García (Sant Cugat Esportiu of San Cugat del Vallés)
2020	Valencia	Polina Berezina (Club Torrevieja of Torrevieja)	Alba Bautista (Club Mabel of Benicarló)	María Añó (Club Mabel of Benicarló)
2021	Valencia	Polina Berezina (Club Torrevieja of Torrevieja)	Salma Solaun (Club Beti-Rítmica of Vitoria-Gasteiz)	Alba Bautista (Club Mabel of Benicarló)
2022	Orense	Polina Berezina (Club Torrevieja of Torrevieja)	Alba Bautista (Club Mabel of Benicarló)	Teresa Gorospe (Club Beti-Rítmica of Vitoria-Gasteiz)
2023	Valencia	Alba Bautista (Club Mabel of Benicarló)	Polina Berezina (Club Torrevieja of Torrevieja)	Cristina Korniychuk (Club Distrito III of Alcalá de Henares)
2024	Avilés	Alba Bautista (Club Mabel of Benicarló)	Polina Berezina (Club Torrevieja of Torrevieja)	Cristina Korniychuk (Club Distrito III of Alcalá de Henares)
2025		Alba Bautista (Club Mabel of Benicarló)	Daniela Picó (Club Calpe)	Lucía González (Club Benidorm)
2026	Guadalajara	Daniela Picó (Club Calpe)	Alba Bautista (Club Mabel of Benicarló)	Lucía González (Club Benidorm)

=== Most successful gymnasts ===
	Gymnast	Club	Wins	Years
1	Carolina Rodríguez	Club Ritmo of León	9	2006, 2009, 2010, 2011, 2012, 2013, 2014, 2015, 2016
2	Almudena Cid	Club Beti-Rítmica de Vitoria-Gasteiz	8	1995, 1996, 1999, 2001, 2002, 2005, 2007, 2008
3	Polina Berezina	Club Torrevieja of Torrevieja	5	2017, 2018, 2020, 2021, 2022
4	Esther Domínguez	C.E.G.R. Zaragoza of Zaragoza	3	1998, 1999, 2000
4	Alba Bautista	Club Mabel of Benicarló	3	2023, 2024, 2025
5	María Jesús Alegre	Club Cuartel de la Montaña de Madrid	2	1976, 1977
5	Sonia Conde	Valladolid	2	1979, 1980
5	Marta Bobo	Club 2000 of Orense	2	1981, 1983
5	Marta Cantón	E.G.R. of Barcelona	2	1982, 1984
5	María Martín	Club Moscardó of Madrid	2	1987, 1988
5	Jennifer Colino	Club Atlético Montemar of Alicante	2	2003, 2004
