= Lourdes Osuna =

Spanish individual rhythmic gymnast

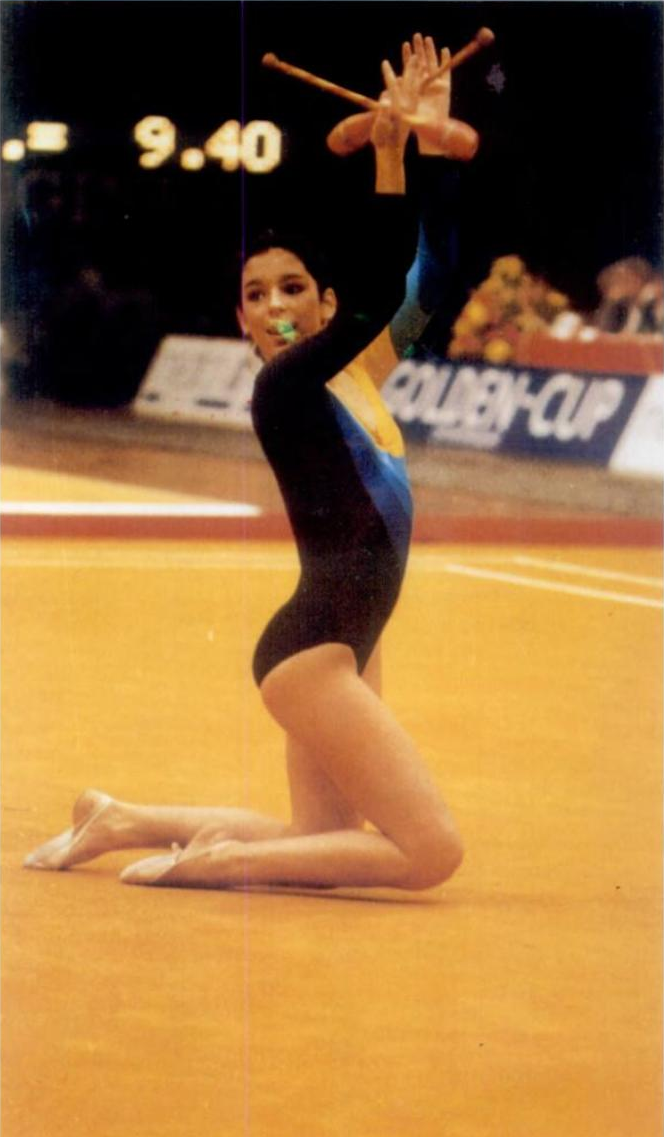

Personal information
- Full name: Lourdes Osuna Alcalaya
- Born: 18 February 1969 (age 57) Madrid, Spain

Gymnastics career
- Discipline: Rhythmic gymnastics
- Country represented: Spain (1983-1985)
- Club: Club Gimnasio Moscardó
- Head coach: Emilia Boneva
- Retired: yes

Lourdes Osuna Alcalaya (born 18 February 1969) is a retired Spanish individual rhythmic gymnast.

== Biography ==
Lourdes started practicing gymnastics when she was 6 years old at the Moscardó Gym Club. In 1979 she was Spanish champion of the 3rd category at the Spanish Championships, which took place in Madrid. In 1982 she managed to become champion of Spain of the 2nd category in Palencia. In 1984 she won silver in the honor category of the Spanish Championship, held in Madrid.

Around 1983 she joined the Spanish national rhythmic gymnastics team as an individual, where he would train at the Moscardó Gymnasium under the orders of the national coach Emilia Boneva. Since then he has participated in various international competitions, like the 1984 European Championships in Vienna where she was 27th in the All-Around.

She retired in March 1985 at the age of 16. In 1993 she graduated in psychology from the Autonomous University of Madrid. She is also a national rhythmic gymnastics coach, coaching at the Elemental Magherit Sports Club in Alcorcón and currently at the Claret School and her own club, the Moscardó Siglo XXI Sports Club, which is based at the Moscardó Gymnasium. Since January 2015 she has been a rhythmic gymnastics judge.

After Emilia Boneva's death on 20 September 2019, Lourdes and other former national gymnasts gathered to pay tribute to her during the Euskalgym held on 16 November 2019, the event took place before 8,500 attendees at the Bilbao Exhibition Center de Baracaldo and was followed by a dinner in her honor.
