= Nuria Salido =

- Full name: Nuria Belén Salido Reyes
- Born: 1972 (age 53–54) Alicante, Spain

Gymnastics career
- Discipline: Rhythmic gymnastics
- Country represented: Spain (1985-?)
- Club: Club Atlético Montemar
- Head coach: Emilia Boneva
- Retired: yes

Nuria Belén Salido Reyes (born 1972) is a retired Spanish rhythmic gymnast. She was the national champion in 1985.

== Biography ==
She took up the sport at the Club Atlético Montemar in Alicante. In 1980 she was 4th in the 3rd category at the Spanish Championships, in 1981, she became the national children champion.

In 1985 she was called up by Emilia Boneva to be part of the national team of Spain as an individual. That same year she was 10th in the I Barcelona City International Cup and substitute gymnast at the World Championships in Valladolid. In December 1985, at only 13 years old, she was crowned senior champion of Spain in Cadiz. In 1986 she participated in the II International Cup Barcelona, being 7th. In Maco de Compostela she finished 6th overall, and in the Corbeil-Essonnes she was 29th. In 1986 she got the award of Best Female Athlete of Alicente.

After her retirement, she trained to become a national licesensed coach and holds a diploma in teaching, specializing in physical education. As a rhythmic gymnastics coach, she has worked in the Club Atlético Montemar, there she trained gymnasts like Jennifer Colino, Marta Linares and Isabel Pagán, in different Alicante schools and in the Municipal Board of Sports of Alicante. In addition, she has coached the national junior group for 4 European Championships. Currently she is still a coach at the Club Montemar, of which her sister Jéssica is the technical director. She has led the club to win numerous medals at the provincial, regional and national levels.

After Boneva's death on 20 September 2019, Nuria and other former national gymnasts gathered to pay tribute to her during the Euskalgym held on 16 November 2019. The event took place before 8,500 attendees at the Bilbao Exhibition Center de Baracaldo and was followed by a dinner in Boneva's honor.
