= Noelia Fernández (gymnast) =

Spanish rhythmic gymnast (born 1976)

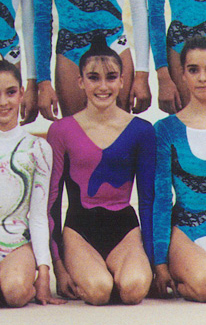
- Full name: Noelia Fernández Navarro
- Born: 21 September 1976 (age 49) Alicante, Spain

Gymnastics career
- Discipline: Rhythmic gymnastics
- Country represented: Spain (1988-2000)
- Club: Club Atlético Montemar
- Head coach: Emilia Boneva
- Retired: yes
Medal record
Representing Spain
European Championships
Bronze medal – third place	1990 Gothenburg	Team
Junior European Championships
Bronze medal – third place	1989 Tenerife	Group All-Around

Noelia Fernández Navarro (born 21 September 1976) is a former Spanish rhythmic gymnast. She's a multiple medalist at the European Championships. From 2004 to 2012 she coached the Spanish senior group in various stages.

== Career ==
At the age of 6 she started practicing rhythmic gymnastics at the Montemar Athletic Club. In 1989 she was selected by Emilia Boneva to be part of the national junior group, coached by Rosa Menor, Paqui Maneus, Cathy Xaudaró and Berta Veiga, and she participated in the European Junior Championship in Tenerife obtaining a bronze medal along Carmen Acedo, Ruth Goñi, Montse Martín, Eider Mendizábal and Gemma Royo as well as Cristina Chapuli and Diana Martín as substitutes.

In 1990 she was the silver medalist at the Spanish national championships, between Ada Liberio and Mónica Ferrández. In November she was selected for the European Championships in Gothenburg where she won team bronze along Carolina Pascual and Mónica Ferrández, she was as well 12th in the All-Around.

After being 4th in 1991, the following year Fernández became national champion, tied with Rosabel Espinosa. In 1993 she was the national runner-up being only surpassed by Carmen Acedo, in November she was crowned champion of the Spanish Cup in Seville both in the all-around and with the four apparatuses. In that period Noelia wanted to retire, but she was called up again for the national team.

In 1998, at the age of 22, she was called to prepare for the World Championships in Seville, although in the end she was not selected. Subsequently, in December 1999 she rejoined the group's training with the possibility to participating in the Olympic Games, but finally retired at the age of 23 shortly before Sydney 2000.

In 2004 she was reserve coach for the senior group, with which she participated in the Olympic Games in Athens, where Spain was 6th. From 2004 to 2007, she was coach of the junior group of the national team, which included gymnasts such as Loreto Achaerandio, Sandra Aguilar and Lidia Redondo. She combined this position with her studies in physical education. Fernández later became assistant coach of Anna Baranova's team for the 2008 Beijing Olympic Games, and in May 2009, after the departure of Sara Bayón, she became assistant coach of the senior group.
