= Mónica Ferrández =

Spanish rhythmic gymnast and trainer

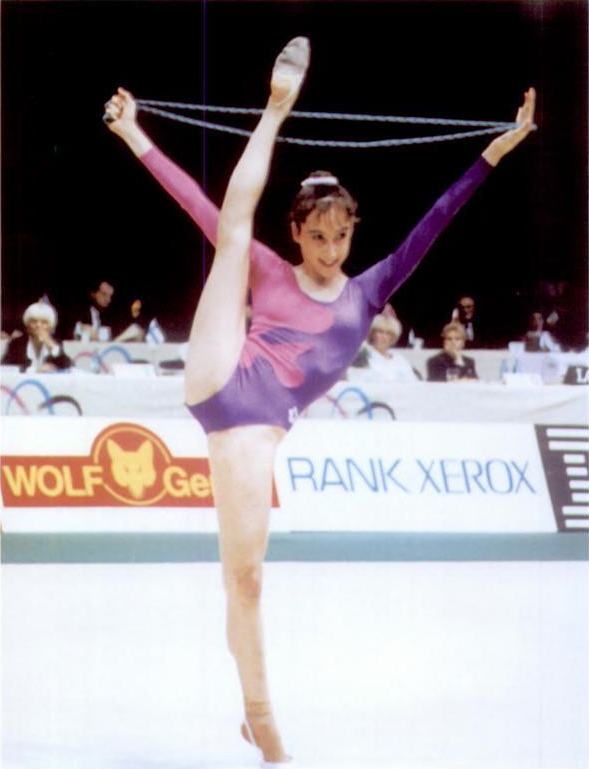

Personal information
- Full name: Mónica Ferrández Arenas
- Born: 25 October 1974 (age 51) Córdoba, Spain

Gymnastics career
- Discipline: Rhythmic gymnastics
- Country represented: Spain (1988-1992)
- Club: Club Atlético Montemar
- Head coach: Emilia Boneva
- Retired: yes
Medal record
Representing Spain
European Championships
Bronze medal – third place	1990 Gothenburg	Team
World Championships
Bronze medal – third place	1991 Athens	Team

Mónica Ferrández Arenas (born 25 October 1974) is a Spanish former rhythmic gymnast and coach. She is also a European and World medalist.

== Career ==
Ferrández took up the sport at age 6 as an extracurricular activity. After a few months, she started training at the Club Atlético Montemar until being invited to the national team in 1988.

In 1990, she won bronze at the Spanish national championships behind Ada Liberio and Noelia Fernández. That November, she was selected for the European Championships in Gothenburg, where she won the team bronze along with Carolina Pascual and Noelia Fernández. Individually, she placed 7th in the all-around.

In October 1991, she competed at the World Championships in Athens, where she was 6th in the all-around, 5th with rope, 7th with hoop, 6th with ball, and 7th with clubs. She won bronze in the team competition along with her teammates Carmen Acedo and Carolina Pascual. At the national championships, she won silver behind Carolina Pascual and ahead of Carolina Borrell. In the 1991 Spanish Cup Final, held in Malaga, she tied for gold with her teammate Carmen Acedo.

She retired in 1992 because of plantar fasciitis in her left foot. After her retirement, she became a coach. From 2012 to 2013, she was the coach of the national junior group, together with Yolanda Andrés. The group was members were Claudia Heredia Paula Gómez, Sara González, Miriam Guerra, Carmen Martínez, and Victoria Plaza. In May 2013, the group competed at the European Championship in Vienna, where they finished in 16th place in the all-around.

Currently, Ferrández is the coordinator of the Escuela Municipal de Gimnasia Rítmica of Torrevieja in Alicante, where she also teaches. Ferrández also coached national team gymnast Polina Berezina from 2004 to 2016 and began coaching her again in 2018. Berezina became part of the Spanish junior team in 2013 and turned senior in 2014; she competed at the 2024 Summer Olympics. Ferrández trains Berezina individually at the Palacio de los Deportes in Torrevieja and travels with her to competitions.
