= María Añó =

Spanish rhythmic gymnast

- Full name: María Añó Baca
- Born: 24 September 2002 (age 23) Benicarló, Spain

Gymnastics career
- Discipline: Rhythmic gymnastics
- Country represented: Spain (2016-)
- Club: Club Mabel / Club Ritmo
- Head coach: Alejandra Quereda
- Assistant coach: Blanca Lopez

María Añó (born 24 September 2002) is a Spanish rhythmic gymnast. She represented her country in international competitions.

== Personal life ==
Añó took up the sport when she was three, her mother took her to ballet classes but she didn't like it. They lived next to a gymnastics hall, so she enrolled María there, after the first class she already knew that she loved gymnastics. Her dream is to compete at the Olympic Games. Her idols are Russian rhythmic gymnasts Aleksandra Soldatova, Dina Averina and Arina Averina and Spanish rhythmic gymnast Carolina Rodriguez.

== Career ==
María competed for the Mabel club of Benicarló and since 2019 to the Club Ritmo de León, she has also been 5 times national champion as an individual and 5 times group national champion, she won silver in the senior honour category in 2019.

She debuted internationally at the 2016 European Championships in Holon, where she performed with rope and hoop, finishing 16th and 17th with the two apparatuses as well as 14th in the team competition. Two years later, as a senior, she performed with hoop at the 2018 World Championships in Sofia, finishing 71st and 17th in the team competitions.

In 2019 Añó took part in three World Cups: Sofia, where she was 28th in the All-Around, 24th with hoop, 54th with ball, 23rd with clubs and 18th with ribbon, Kazan finishing 30th in the All-Around, 23rd with hoop, 43rd with ball, 27th with clubs and 19th with ribbon and Portimão 14th in the All-Around, 16th with hoop, 27th with ball, 12th with ribbon and qualified for the clubs' final where she finished in 8th place. She was then selected for the European Championships in Baku, where she was 10th in the All-Around, 20th with hoop, 31st with ball, 10th with clubs and 12th with ribbon. In September she participated in the World Championships finishing 11th in the team competition, 39th in the All-Around, 26th with hoop, 36th with ball, 65th with clubs and 85th with ribbon.
