= Iratxe Aurrekoetxea =

Spanish rhythmic gymnast, coach

Iratxe Aurrekoetxea Urrutikoetxea
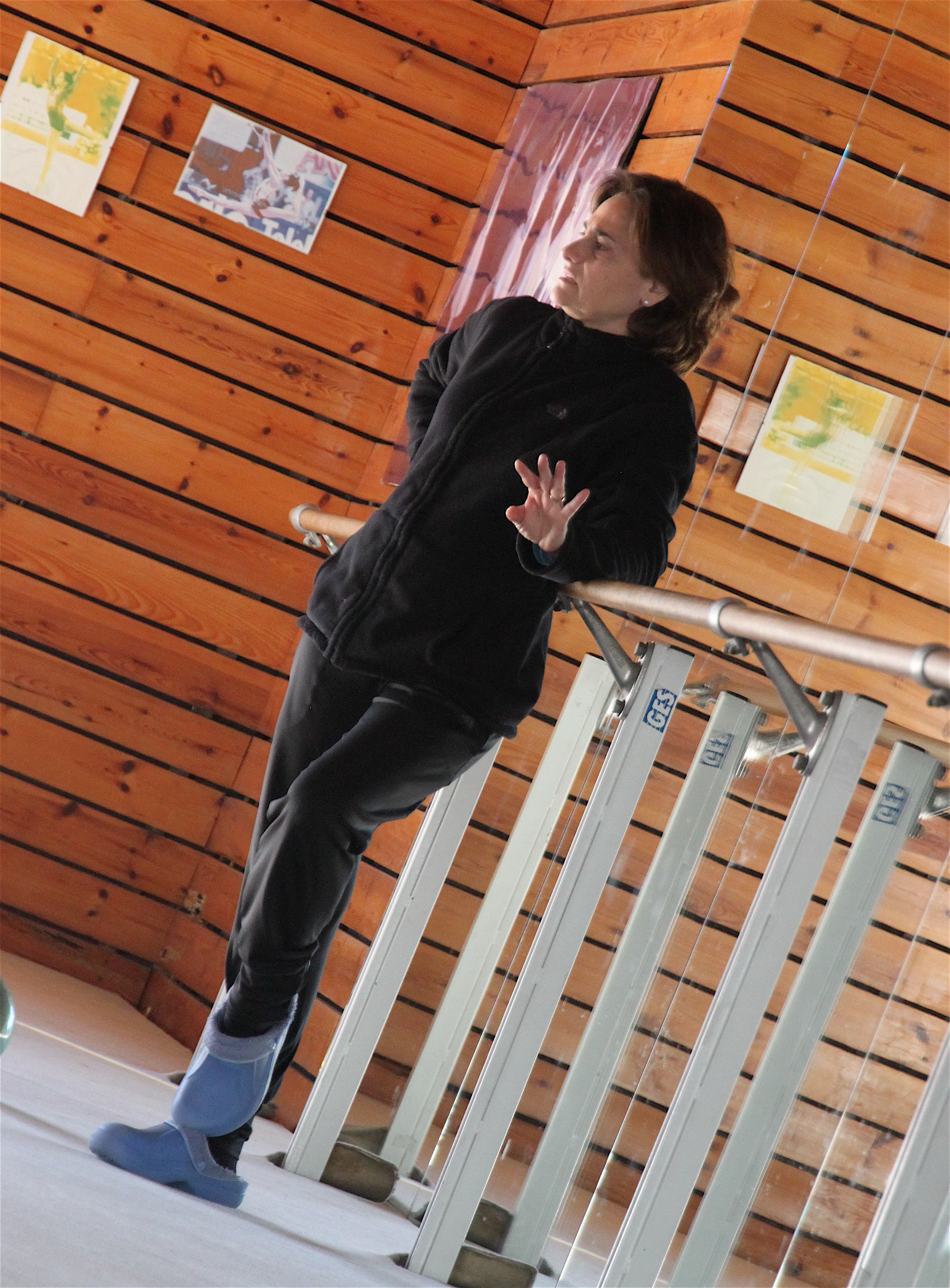
- Born: 18 December 1969 (age 56); Erandio, Spain
- Education: University of the Basque Country
- Occupation: Rhythmic gymnastics coach
- Years active: 1989-present

Iratxe Aurrekoetxea Urrutikoetxea (born 18 December 1969) is a retired Spanish rhythmic gymnast and coach. She has trained some of the most prominent gymnasts in Spain.

== Biography ==
At the age of 12, Iratxe was the Vizcaya rhythmic gymnastics champion and five-time champion of the Basque Country. She graduated in Physical Education from the Basque Institute of Physical Education (IVEF), current Faculty of Physical Activity and Sports Sciences at the University of the Basque Country. In addition, she completed a doctorate in Physical Activities and Sports in the Department of History of Education of said university (1992–1993), and qualified as a national rhythmic gymnastics coach and judge from the Royal Spanish Gymnastics Federation.

Iratxe began training at a school in the Vitoria City Council, which was soon renamed Club IVEF. This club later became Club Aurrera, and in 1996, Club Beti Aurrera, she worked there from 1989 to 1997. During this stage she trained, together with Aurora Fernández del Valle, outstanding gymnasts such as Lorena Barbadillo, María Ereñaga, Almudena Cid, Tania Lamarca and Estíbaliz Martínez, who would later be part of the Spanish group. She later coached said group, collaborating with María Fernández Ostolaza in preparing the individual national team for the World Championships in Seville and the European Championships in Porto.

After the 2000 Sydney Olympic Games, Almudena Cid returned to Vitoria to be trained by Iratxe again. Shortly after, both moved to Barcelona after a call from the Catalan Gymnastics Federation, with Iratxe being named head of the rhythmic gymnastics section of the San Cugat del Vallés High Performance Center in 2001 and coach of the Catalan rhythmic gymnastics team ( A.G.R. Catalunya) in 2002. At the CAR of San Cugat she returned to train Almudena for 8 years, supervisioning developing her preparation for the Athens 2004 and Beijing 2008 Olympic Games. In addition, Iratxe has subsequently trained other international gymnasts with the Spanish team in the same place, such as Nuria Velasco, Esther Escolar, Nuria Artigues, Marina Fernández, Adelina Fominykh, Júlia Usón, Clara Esquerdo and Natalia García. On November 8, 2008, she was honored during the Euskalgym, held in Durango, and on June 18, 2011, she was honored along with Almudena Cid at the II City of Barcelona International Rhythmic Gymnastics Trophy.
