= Polina Berezina =

Spanish rhythmic gymnast (born 1997)

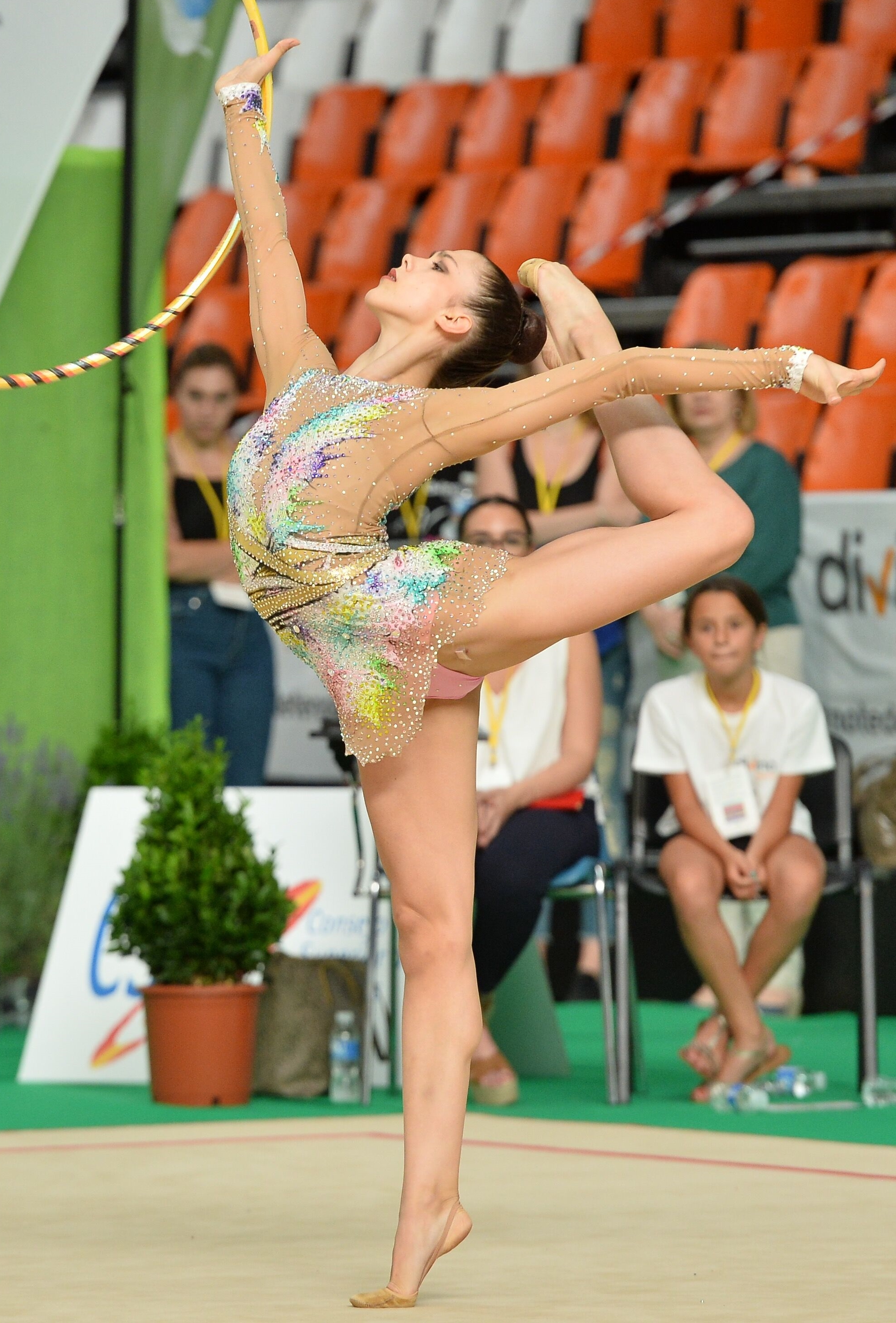
- Berezina in 2017

Personal information
- Full name: Polina Berezina Ksenofontova
- Born: 5 December 1997 (age 28) Moscow, Russia

Gymnastics career
- Discipline: Rhythmic gymnastics
- Country represented: Spain (2015-2024)
- Training location: Madrid, Spain
- Club: Club Gimnasia Rítmica Torrevieja
- Head coach: Mónica Ferrández
- Retired: yes
Medal record
Rhythmic Gymnastics
Representing Spain
World Championships
Bronze medal – third place	2022 Sofia	Team
FIG World Cup
Event	1st	2nd	3rd
World Cup	0	0	1
Total	0	0	1

Polina Berezina Ksenofontova (born 5 December 1997) is a Russian-born Spanish retired individual rhythmic gymnast. She has competed at seven Rhythmic Gymnastics World Championships and won a bronze medal with the Spanish team in 2022. She is a five-time (2017, 2018, 2020, 2021, 2022) Spanish national all-around champion at the senior level. She competed at the 2024 Summer Olympics in the individual all-around and placed 15th in the qualifications.

== Early life ==
Berezina was born in Moscow, Russia, and has lived in Alicante, Spain, since 2001. At the age of 7, she took up rhythmic gymnastics in Guardamar del Segura and, at the age of 8, entered a rhythmic gymnastics club in Torrevieja, where she trained under Mónica Ferrández until 2016. By 2008, her father's work led her to live again in Moscow, and she began to train in both Spain, with Mónica Ferrández, and Russia, with Oksana Skaldina.

== Career ==
Berezina received her Spanish citizenship in 2013, enabling her to compete for the Spanish national team in international competitions. She made her international debut at the 2013 Gymnasiade and won a bronze medal in the hoop final.

=== 2015-16 ===
Berezina finished 26th in the all-around at the 2015 Lisbon World Cup. She then finished 25th in the all-around at the Bucharest World Cup and 19th at the Tashkent World Cup. At the Budapest World Cup, she dropped one of her clubs during her routine and placed 28th in the all-around. She then finished 29th all-around at the Kazan World Cup. She made her World Championships debut in 2015 and was selected to perform in the ribbon event. On her last throw, her ribbon went out of bounds, so she did not advance to the event final. The Spanish team of Berezina, Natalia García, Sara Llana, and Carolina Rodríguez finished 10th.

Berezina began the season at the 2016 Espoo World Cup, finishing 25th in the all-around. Then at the Pesaro World Cup, she finished 40th in the all-around, and she finished 25th at the Kazan World Cup.

=== 2017 ===
Berezina began the season with a 39th-place finish at the Pesaro World Cup. She then finished 23rd at the Tashkent World Cup. At the Portimão World Challenge Cup, she finished 12th in the all-around and qualified for the clubs final where she finished seventh. She competed with the ribbon at the European Championships and helped the Spanish team finish 12th. In June, she won her first Spanish national all-around title. She finished 18th in the all-around at the Minsk World Challenge Cup and 31st at the Kazan World Challenge Cup. She finished 34th in the all-around during the qualification round of the World Championships, missing out on the all-around final.

=== 2018 ===
Berezina placed 19th in the all-around at the Sofia World Cup thanks to consistent performances. She then finished 26th at the Pesaro World Cup and 23rd at the Baku World Cup. Then at the Guadalajara World Challenge Cup, she finished 16th in the all-around. In June, she competed at the European Championships and qualified for the all-around final, where she finished 20th. Later that month, she successfully defended her Spanish national all-around title. She then competed at the Mediterranean Games and placed fourth in the all-around final. She finished 25th in the all-around at the Minsk World Challenge Cup and then 16th at the Kazan World Challenge Cup. At the World Championships, she finished 37th in the all-around during the qualification round, and the Spanish team finished 17th.

=== 2019 ===
Berezina finished 30th in the all-around at the Pesaro World Cup. Then at the Guadalajara World Challenge Cup, she finished 13th in the all-around. She finished 7th with the Spanish team at the European Championships. She then competed at the Minsk World Challenge Cup, finishing 21st in the all-around. At the Portimão World Challenge Cup, she finished 12th in the all-around and qualified for the clubs and ribbon finals, finishing sixth in both. Berezina competed at the World Championships and qualified for her first World all-around final and finished 22nd. Because she did not place in the top 16, Spain did not earn a berth for the 2020 Olympic Games.

=== 2020-21 ===
Berezina did not compete in 2020 until the Spanish Championships in December due to the COVID-19 pandemic. There, she won her third national all-around title. She competed at all four events on the 2021 World Cup series to earn points for Olympic qualification. In Sofia, she finished 14th in the all-around. Then in Tashkent, she finished 19th in the all-around and eighth in the clubs final. At the Baku and Pesaro World Cups, she placed 26th in the all-around. Only the top three eligible gymnasts earned berths for the Olympic Games, and Berezina did not earn enough points to be in the top three.

Berezina competed at the 2021 European Championships, her final chance to earn an Olympic berth. She finished 15th in the all-around and did not obtain the one available Olympic berth. In July 2021, Berezina won her fourth Spanish all-around title. She then competed at the World Championships and finished 25th in the qualification round.

=== 2022 ===
Berezina finished 13th in the all-around at the Pesaro World Cup and also qualified for the ball final, finishing eighth. In June, she competed at the European Championships and placed 23rd in the all-around final. Later that month, she successfully defended her Spanish national all-around title. At the Portimão World Challenge Cup, she finished 10th in the all-around and fourth in the ball final. Then at the Cluj Napoca World Challenge Cup, she finished 11th in the all-around and eighth in the clubs final. At the World Championships, she was part of the Spanish delegation that won the bronze medal in the team event.

=== 2023 ===
Berezina won her first FIG World Cup medal at the 2023 Athens World Cup in the hoop final behind Sofia Raffaeli and Fanni Pigniczki. Then at the Thiais Grand Prix, she won a bronze medal with the hoop and a gold medal with the ball. At the Baku World Cup, she placed 15th in the all-around and seventh in the hoop final. She finished eighth in the all-around at the European Championships, and she also qualified for her first European apparatus final, finishing eighth with the hoop. She then finished second to Alba Bautista at the Spanish Championships. She finished 14th in the all-around at the 2023 World Championships and qualified for the 2024 Olympic Games.

=== 2024 ===
Berezina finished 11th in the all-around at the Portimão World Challenge Cup and seventh in the hoop final. Then at the European Championships, she finished 13th in the all-around final. She then placed 13th in the all-around at the Cluj Napoca World Challenge Cup and eighth in the ball final. In August, Berezina competed at the 2024 Summer Olympics. She ended the qualification round in 15th place and did not advance to the final.

She announced her retirement from competitive sport in September 2025 via her Instagram profile.

== Personal life ==
Berezina studies audiovisual communication at the Universidad Católica San Antonio de Murcia in Murcia, as of 2024. Her goal is to become a film director. She is fluent in Russian, Spanish, and English. She has one older sister who works in film and music in Moscow.

== Competitive history ==
Year	Event	Team	AA	HP	BA	CL	RB
Junior
2013	Gymnasiade			3rd place, bronze medalist(s)			
Senior: Nationals
2017	Spanish Championships		1st place, gold medalist(s)				
2018	Spanish Championships		1st place, gold medalist(s)				
2020	Spanish Championships		1st place, gold medalist(s)				
2021	Spanish Championships		1st place, gold medalist(s)				
2022	Spanish Championships		1st place, gold medalist(s)				
2023	Spanish Championships		2nd place, silver medalist(s)				
Senior: International
2015	Lisbon World Cup		26				
2015	Bucharest World Cup		25				
2015	Tashkent World Cup		19				
2015	Budapest World Cup		28				
2015	Kazan World Cup		29				
2015	World Championships	10					
2016	Espoo World Cup		25				
2016	Pesaro World Cup		40				
2016	Kazan World Cup		25				
2017	Pesaro World Cup		39				
2017	Tashkent World Cup		23				
2017	Portimão World Challenge Cup		12			7	
2017	European Championships	12					
2017	Minsk World Challenge Cup		18				
2017	Kazan World Challenge Cup		31				
2017	World Championships		34				
2018	Sofia World Cup		19				
2018	Pesaro World Cup		26				
2018	Baku World Cup		23				
2018	Guadalajara World Challenge Cup		16				
2018	European Championships		20				
2018	Mediterranean Games		4				
2018	Minsk World Challenge Cup		25				
2018	Kazan World Challenge Cup		16				
2018	World Championships	17	37				
2019	Pesaro World Cup		30				
2019	Guadalajara World Challenge Cup		13				
2019	European Championships	7	16				
2019	Minsk World Challenge Cup		21				
2019	Portimão World Challenge Cup		12			6	6
2019	World Championships	11	22				
2021	Sofia World Cup		14				
2021	Tashkent World Cup		19			8	
2021	Baku World Cup		26				
2021	Pesaro World Cup		26				
2021	European Championships	8	15				
2021	World Championships	10	25				
2022	Pesaro World Cup		13		8		
2022	European Championships	6	23				
2022	Portimão World Challenge Cup		10		4		
2022	Cluj Napoca World Challenge Cup		11			8	
2022	World Championships	3rd place, bronze medalist(s)	20				
2023	Athens World Cup		8	3rd place, bronze medalist(s)		8	
2023	Thiais Grand Prix			3rd place, bronze medalist(s)	1st place, gold medalist(s)		
2023	Baku World Cup		15	7			
2023	European Championships	6	8	8			
2023	World Championships	5	14			5	
2024	Portimão World Challenge Cup		11	7			
2024	European Championships	5	13				
2024	Cluj Napoca World Challenge Cup		12		8		
2024	Olympic Games		15				

== Routine music information ==
Year	Apparatus	Music Title
2016	Hoop	Prophecy by Full Tilt (Dracula Untold Epic Trailer)
2016	Ball	Everything by Sean Christopher
2016	Clubs	March of the Magicians by Lorenzo Castellarin
2016	Ribbon	SOS New York by Borislav Slavnov (Crysis 2)
2017-18	Hoop	I Wanna Dance by Artem Uzunov
2017-18	Ball	Solo ESS3 by Edith Salazar
2017-18	Clubs	Act One: Trouble by DeeLee and Brenda
2017-18	Ribbon	Ghost of Sky (Epic Dub) by Steed Lord
2019	Hoop	The Earth's Fall by Peter Crowley
2019	Ball	Can't Hold Us (feat. Ray Dalton) by Macklemore & Ryan Lewis
2019	Clubs	Lijo by Alina Orlova
2019	Ribbon	March of the Magicians by Lorenzo Castellarin
2020	Hoop	Brothers in Arms (Extended Version) by Junkie XL
2020	Ball	Can't Hold Us (feat. Ray Dalton) by Macklemore & Ryan Lewis
2020	Clubs	Reel Around the Sun by Bill Whelan
2020	Ribbon	Hedwig's Theme / Buckbeak's Flight by John Williams
2021	Hoop	Brothers in Arms (Extended Version) by Junkie XL
2021	Ball	Charms by Abel Korzeniowski
2021	Clubs	Reel Around the Sun by Bill Whelan
2021	Ribbon	Hedwig's Theme / Buckbeak's Flight by John Williams
2022	Hoop	The Rise of Skywalker - Epic Version by Samuel Kim
2022	Ball	Shang-Chi Main Theme by Samuel Kim
2022	Clubs	Rock DJ by Robbie Williams
2022	Ribbon	To Build a Home by The Cinematic Orchestra
2023	Hoop	Time Will Catch Me First by Peter Crowley
2023	Ball	Shang-Chi Main Theme by Samuel Kim
2023	Clubs	Running Up That Hill (Stranger Things) by Kate Bush
2023	Ribbon	Flashdance... What a Feeling (Radio Edit) by Irene Cara
2024	Hoop	Time Will Catch Me First by Peter Crowley
2024	Ball	HOPE by NF
2024	Clubs	We Know What You Whisper (feat. Busiswa) / Waterfall Fight / Wakanda by Ludwig Göransson
2024	Ribbon	Pompeii MMXXIII by Bastille & Hans Zimmer
