= Almudena Cid =

Spanish rhythmic gymnast

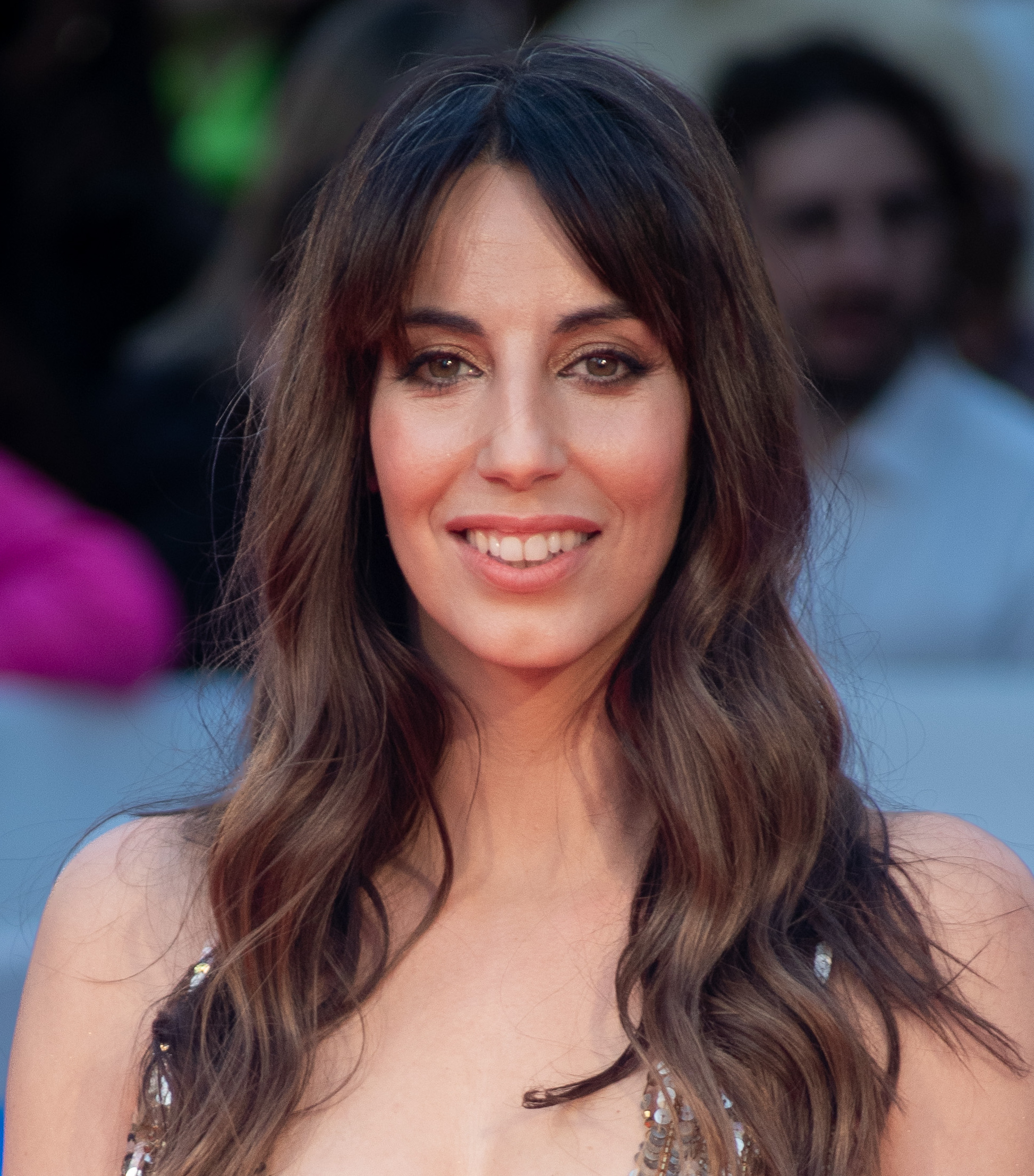
- Cid attending a Festival de Málaga in 2024.

Personal information
- Full name: Almudena Cid Tostado
- Born: June 15, 1980 (age 46) Vitoria, Spain
- Height: 167 cm (5 ft 6 in)

Gymnastics career
- Discipline: Rhythmic gymnastics
- Country represented: Spain (1994~2008)
- Club: Beti Aurrera
- Assistant coach: Anna Baranova
- Former coach: Iratxe Aurrekoetxea
- Eponymous skills: Cid Tostado Element (ball)
- Retired: 2008
Medal record
Representing Spain
European Team Championships
| Bronze medal – third place | 2001 Riesa | Team |
Mediterranean Games
| Gold medal – first place | 2005 Almería | All-around |

Almudena Cid Tostado (born 15 June 1980 in Vitoria, País Vasco, Spain) is a former Spanish individual rhythmic gymnast who competed on the Spanish national team. She is the only rhythmic gymnast who has competed in four Olympic finals.

She became the first Spanish gymnast in history to have competed in two Olympic finals, Atlanta and Sydney, and she is the only rhythmic gymnast to make the finals at four consecutive Olympic Games: Atlanta 1996, Sydney 2000, Athens 2004 and Beijing 2008.

She also won the gold medal in the XVth Mediterranean Games Almería 2005 and she has been awarded many other national and international recognitions, including the 2009 gold medal in the Royal Order of Sports Merit, a Spanish civil Order of Merit intended to recognise yearly activities in the fields of sport and physical education.

In June 2001, the Fédération Internationale de Gymnastique announced that Almudena's "body-apparatus relationship" with the ball was approved by the Rhythmic Gymnastics Technical Committee. As the code describes the Cid Tostado element:

Starting position: on one knee, leg forward, ball held with the foot. large roll of the ball on both legs. Originality 0.10 (§ 2.6.5.)

After a career lasting 21 years, she retired from rhythmic gymnastics on 23 August 2008. Currently, she is working as a sports commentator for rhythmic gymnastics competitions. Since 2014, she has also been writing Olympia, a children's collection of stories in which she talks about her sporting life.

== Early life and training ==
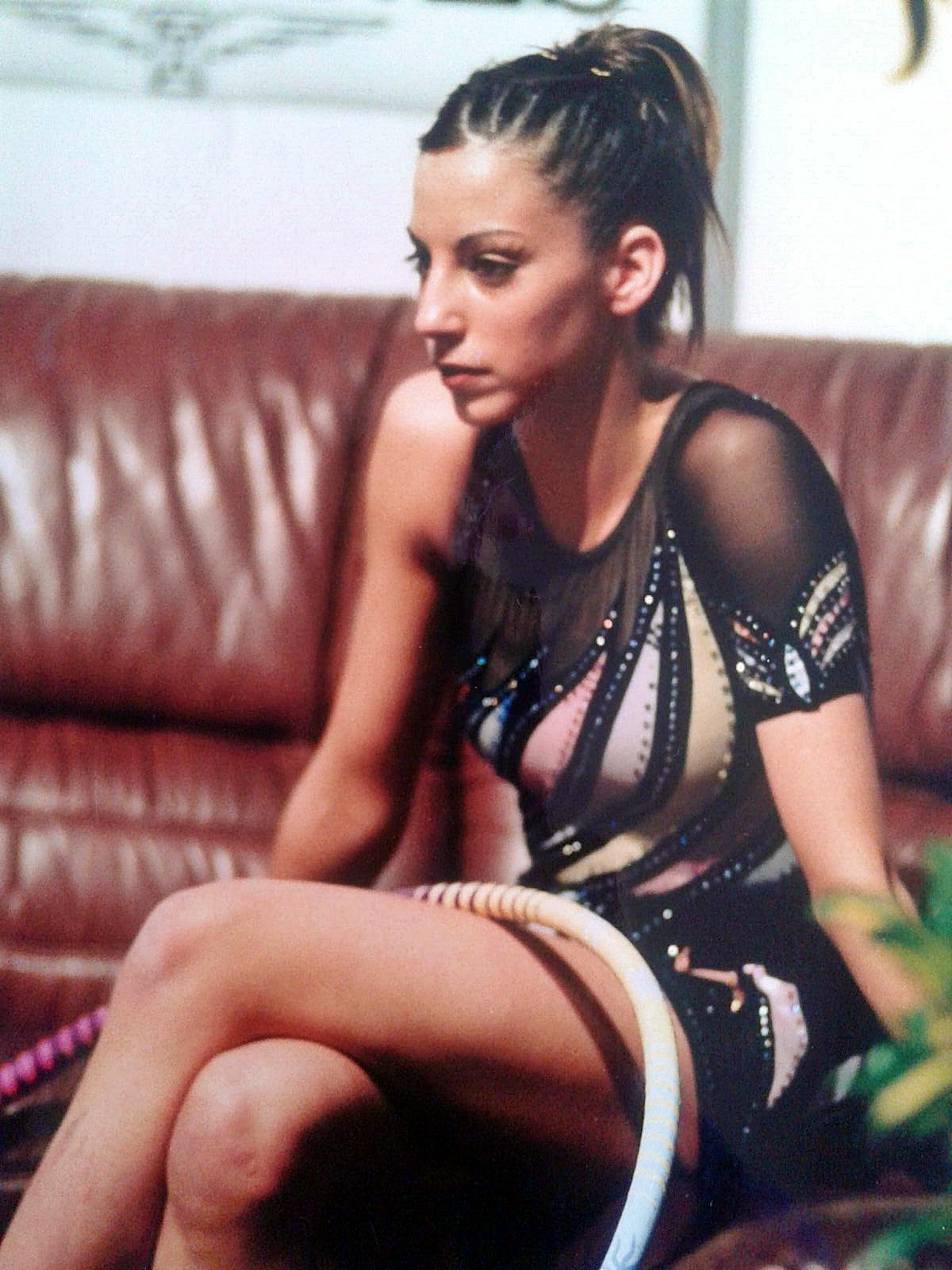
Cid in the 'Kiss n Cry Area' at the 2003 European Championships

She started practising rhythmic gymnastics at the age of 7. She first went to Arabatxo club and then to Beti Aurrera club in Vitoria, in which other important gymnasts such as Tania Lamarca and Estíbaliz Martínez were trained. Her coaches there were Aurora Fernández del Valle and Iratxe Aurrekoetxea. One of Almudena's first sports references, as she named them because she doesn't like to call them idols, was the Russian gymnast Oxana Kostina.

In May 1994, at the age of 13, she took part in the first international competition, in which she received three medals (one gold medal and two bronze medals). In November of the same year, she was asked by Emilia Boneva to start being part of the Spanish national individual team in Madrid, where she trained an average of 8 hours a day in the gym Gimnasio Moscardó.

At the 1995 Spanish Individual Championships, Almudena took the lead at a national level for the first time. In June 1995 she got the 12th position at the Final European Cup in Telford (England).

== Senior career ==
Since she started her sporting career, she has been awarded many recognitions, apart from the ones obtained at the Olympic Games.

=== 1996 ===
In 1996, she went to her first Olympic Games in Atlanta, where she participated for the individual team, along with her colleague Alba Caride. She achieved the fifth position in the preliminary round and the ninth position in the semi-final. Finally, she got the ninth position in the Olympics final, being the youngest participant in the competition.

=== 2000 ===
Due to her good marks at the European Championship in Zaragoza, she was selected in order to represent Spain at the 2000 Sydney Olympics. Again, she got the ninth position.

In her hometown, Vitoria, she met her former trainer Iratxe, who motivated Almudena's sporting life. They both moved to Barcelona and started working again together.

=== 2004 ===
In 2004, the Spanish Gymnastics Federation decided that Almudena Cid and Jennifer Colino had to compete against each other in order to choose who would represent Spain at the 2004 Athens Olympics. The competition was at a very high level - nearly at Olympic level - causing mental and physical weariness and increasing the risk of injury before the Olympic Games. After obtaining the best marks, Almudena went to the 2004 Athens Olympics.

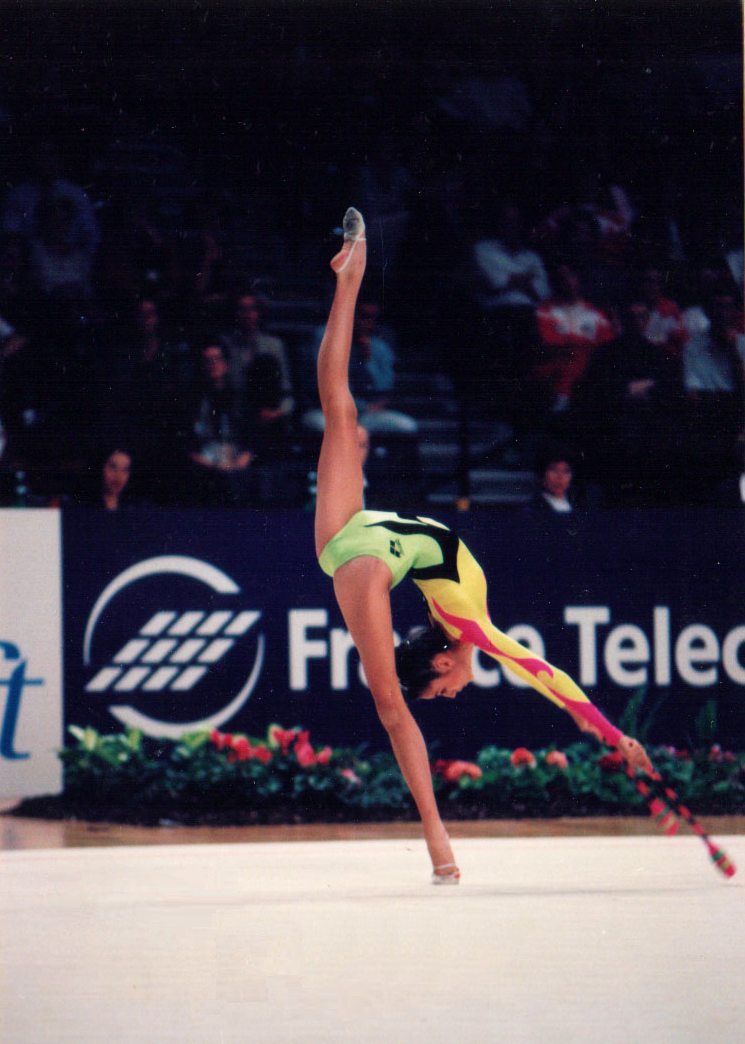
Almudena's worldwide debut in Viena (1995)

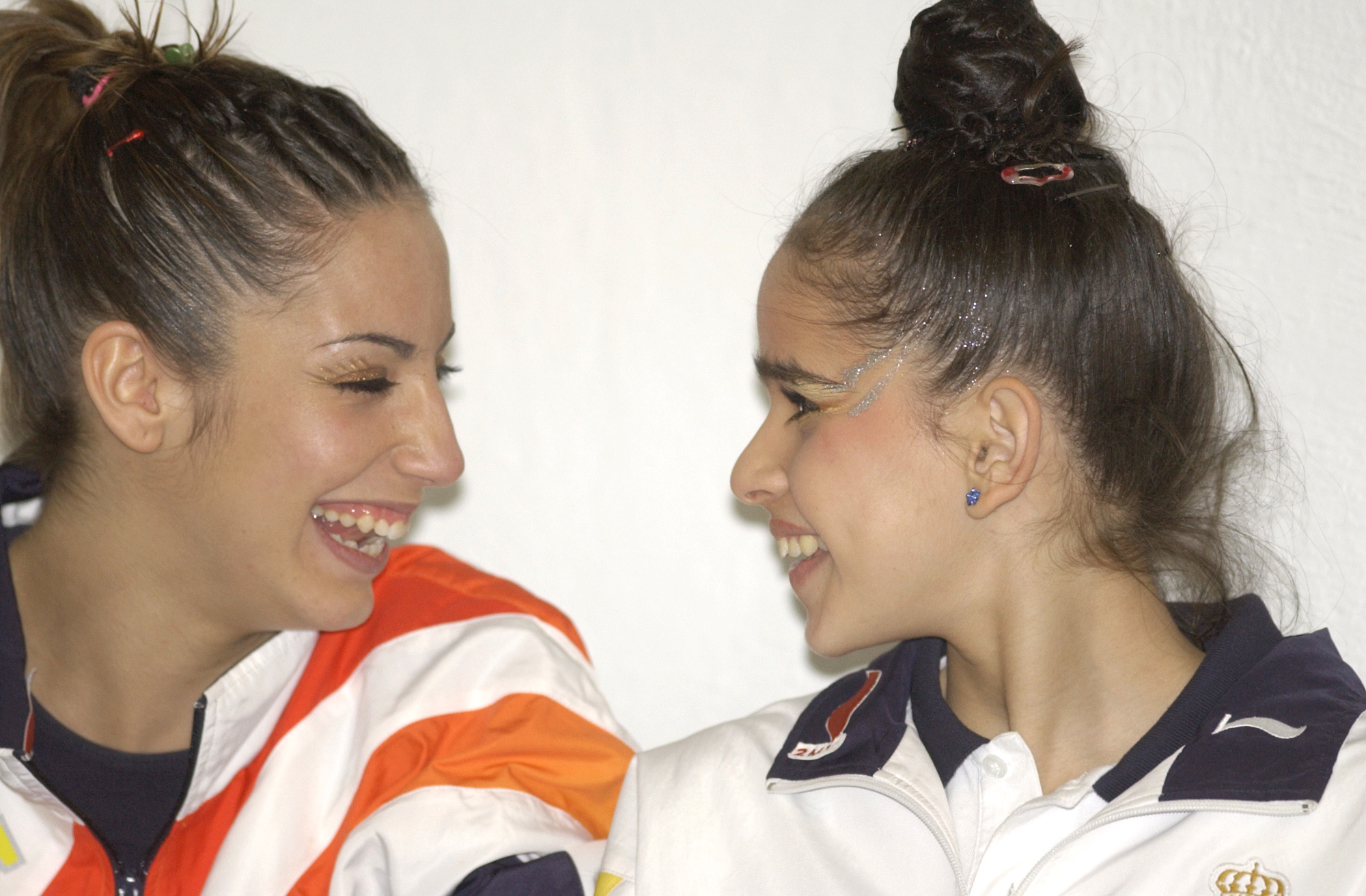
Almudena Cid and Jennifer Colino in a championship in Granada (2002)

In these Games she reached her third olympic final, something that no other rhythmic gymnastics had gotten until then. In the final, that took place on 29 August, she got the eighth position, along with the Olympic diploma. And she earned a trophy of Rio of Janeiro

=== 2008 ===
Once again, Almudena was selected to represent Spain at 2008 Beijing Olympics, her fourth and last Olympic Games.

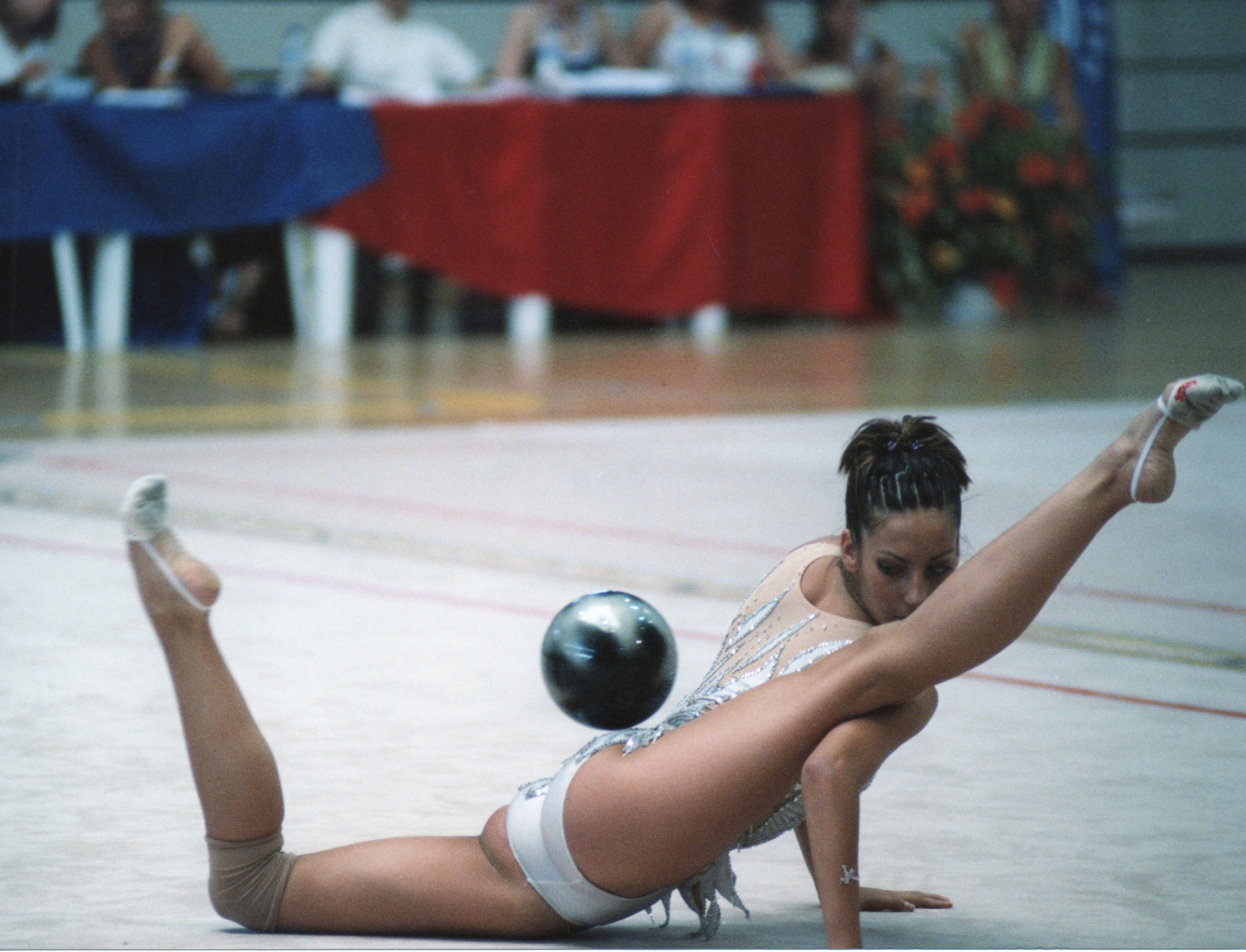
Almudena doing the so-called Cid Tostado Element

| Olympic Games | Position | Apparatus/Score | Total Score |
|---|---|---|---|
| 1996 Atlanta Olympics | 9th | Rope 9.700 Clubs 9.683 Ball 9.566 Ribbon 9.566 | 38.515 |
| 2000 Sydney Olympics | 9th | Rope 9.750 Hoop 9.725 Ball 9.691 Ribbon 9.741 | 38.907 |
| 2004 Athens Olympics | 8th | Ribbon 23.425 Clubs 24.900 Ball 25.000 Hoop 25.125 | 98.450 |
| 2008 Beijing Olympics | 8th | Rope: 17.000 Hoop: 17.000 Clubs: 17.150 Ribbon: 16.950 | 68.100 |

== Retirement ==
On 23 August 2008, she put an end to her sporting career. It coincided with the very last day of the Olympics finals in Beijing, in which she got the eighth position, along with the Olympic diploma. Her last exercise was with ribbon, accompanied by an adaptation of "Nessun dorma", which is an aria by Giacomo Puccini. As a final gesture as a gymnast, she drew the shape of a heart on the mat and she kissed it.

Some years later, Almudena explained in an interview about her retirement and legacy in the field of rhythmic gymnastics:

"It was hard to decide when to retire, but I chose the moment that I wanted [...]. I’ve been trying for 8 years to avoid the idea that I was already too old to practise this sport. At the age of 28, I managed to show the world that I could be on top [...]. If it’s a sport in which judges evaluates also your facial expressions and how you use the apparatus, because people tend to think that rhythmic gymnastics only have to do with flexibility, but the apparatus is also very important. It’s an art and it is something that comes along with maturity [...]. I didn’t really get what it was about, and I therefore wondered: why do rhythmic gymnasts retire so soon? Because it is the society that retires you from it. I fought against all that."

== Personal life ==
In 2007, Christian Gálvez met Cid in Pasapalabra, they dated for three years and were married on 7 August 2010 in Torrelodones, Madrid, by the mayor of Móstoles. They divorced in 2022
