= Carolina Rodríguez (gymnast) =

Spanish rhythmic gymnast

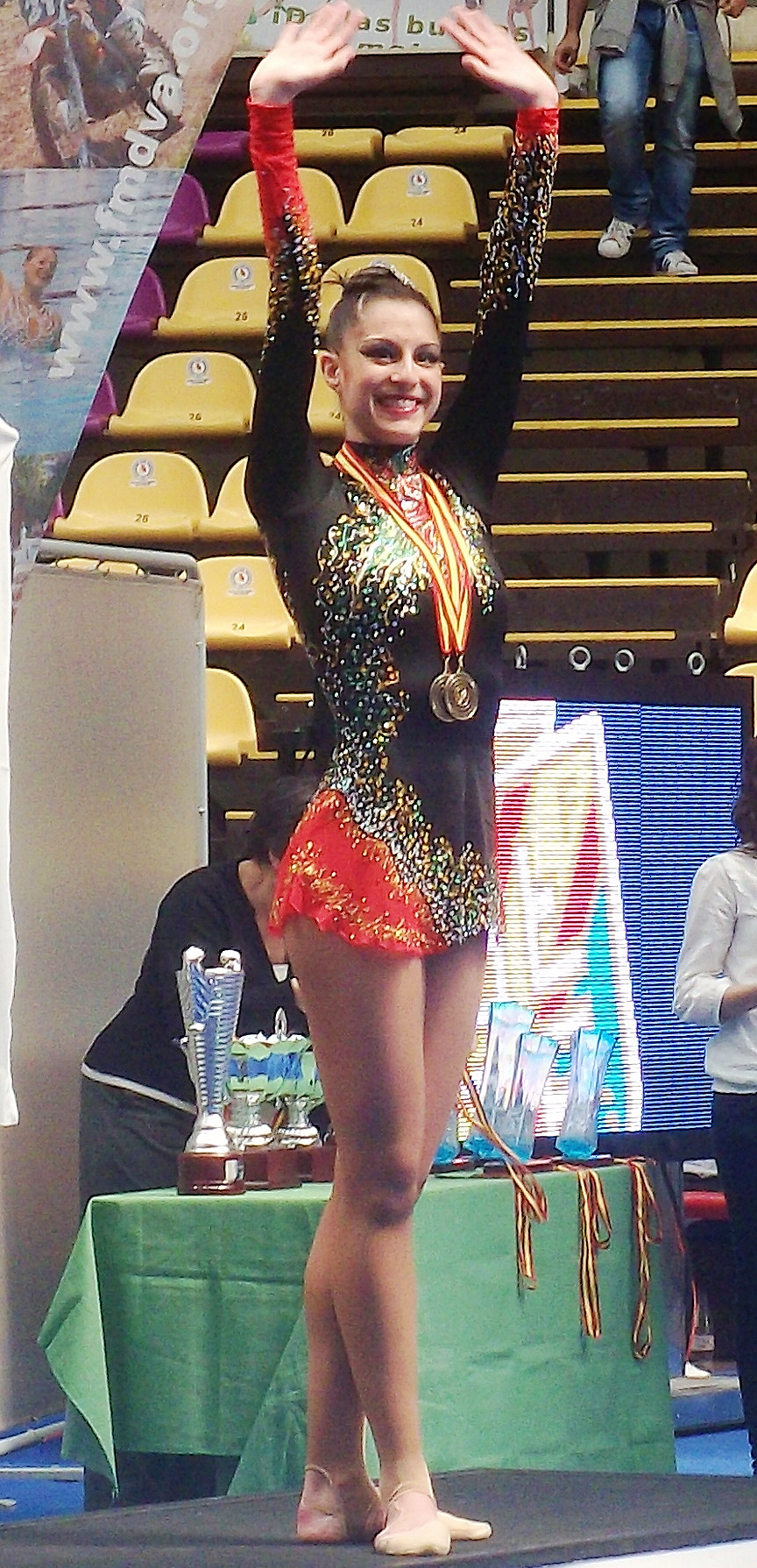

Personal information
- Full name: Carolina Rodríguez Ballesteros
- Born: 24 May 1986 (age 40) León, Spain

Gymnastics career
- Discipline: Rhythmic gymnastics
- Country represented: Spain; (2001 - 2016)
- Club: Spanish Team Ritmo
- Head coach: Ruth Fernández Menéndez
- Assistant coach: Nuria Castaño
- Choreographer: Dagmara Brown
- Retired: yes
Medal record
Rhythmic Gymnastics
Representing Spain
Mediterranean Games
Gold medal – first place	2013 Mersin	All-around
Bronze medal – third place	2009 Pescara	All-around

Carolina Rodríguez Ballesteros (Note: In this Spanish name, the first or paternal surname is Rodríguez and the second or maternal family name is Ballesteros.) (born 24 May 1986 in León) is a Spanish retired rhythmic gymnast. She is a veteran of the sport who started her senior career in the early 2000s. She competed in three Olympic cycles: at the 2004 Athens where she was member of the Spanish group, at the 2012 London competing as an individual gymnast where she finished 14th in all-around qualifications and at the 2016 Rio competing again as an individual, finishing in 8th in the rhythmic gymnastics individual all-around final.

== Career ==
=== Early years ===
Rodríguez began rhythmic gymnastics at the age of seven. She says, “Since the first time I saw this sport I fell in love with it.” She competes for the Ritmo club. She has three coaches who are Nina Vitrichenko, Ruth Fernández Menéndez, and Nuria Castaño Fernández. Rodríguez trains for 25 hours per week and she dreams of becoming an Olympic medalist.

In 2001 during the World Championships in Madrid, she became the Junior National Vice-Champion. At the Spanish Rhythmic Gymnastics Championships, she became National Champion three times in individual performances. She was fourth at the 1999 European Championships in the Junior Group. Finally, she was first at the International Tournament of Portimao 1999 also as part of the Junior Group.

In 2009, she won her first World Cup medal, a bronze in ball in Corbeil-Essonnes and won bronze medal in all-around at the 2009 Mediterranean Games in Pescara. At the 2009 European Championships, she won the public vote.

=== Breakthrough 2013 - present ===
In 2013, Rodriguez had her breakthrough season, she won the 2013 Mediterranean Games in Mersin beating Greek gymnast Varvara Filiou (silver) and France's Kseniya Moustafaeva (bronze). In 2014 season, Rodriguez achieved her highest placement in the World Cup series at the 2014 Lisboa World Cup finishing 4th in all-around. She qualified to 3 event finals and won a bronze in clubs. On 30 May – 1 June Rodriguez competed at the 2014 Minsk World Cup and finished 14th in all-around. On 10–15 June, Rodriguez competed at the 2014 European Championships and finished 10th in all-around. at a press conference, Rodriguez announce her plans to continue competing until the 2016 Olympic Games in Rio de Janeiro, Brazil. On 8–10 August, Rodríguez competed at the 2014 Sofia World Cup finishing 11th in all-around finals. On 22–28 September, Rodriguez placed a career high at the 2014 World Championships finishing 10th in the all-around finals with a total of 68.448 points and qualified to an event final (in ribbon) for the first time at Worlds. In 2015, Rodriguez competed at the 2015 Holon Grand Prix finishing 13th in all-around. Rodriguez finished 15th in all-around at the 2015 Berlin Grand Prix. On 15–21 June, Rodriguez competed at the inaugural 2015 European Games where she finished 13th in the all-around. In July, Rodriguez won the all-around gold at the Izmir International Tournament ahead of Jana Berezko-Marggrander. In August, Rodriguez finished 14th in the all-around at the 2015 Sofia World Cup. On 9–13 September, Rodriguez competed at the 2015 World Championships in Stuttgart and finished 9th in the All-around finals with a total of 70.248 points.

On 12–13 March, Rodriguez competed at the MTM Tournament in Ljubljana, Slovenia finishing 4th in the all-around with a total of 70.750 points, in the apparatus finals; she won a silver in ball. On 17–19 June, Rodriguez competed at the 2016 European Championships where she finished in 9th place with a total of 72.049 points. On 1–3 July, Ashirbayeva competed at the 2016 Berlin World Cup finishing 8th in the all-around with a total of 70.250 points and qualified to all 4 apparatus finals. On 19–20 August, Rodriguez competed at the 2016 Summer Olympics held in Rio de Janeiro, Brazil. She qualified to the rhythmic gymnastics individual all-around final where she finished in 8th place. She announced her retirement from her competitive sports after the Olympic Games.

== Routine music information ==
Year	Apparatus	Music title
2016	Hoop	Punta del Faro by Paco de Lucia
2016	Ball	Imaginando by Diana Navarro
2016	Clubs	Ritmo De Bulerias De Cadiz by El Junco
2016	Ribbon	Tema De Sira, El tiempo entre costuras by Cesar Benito
2015	Hoop	Punta del Faro by Paco de Lucia
2015	Ball	Aqua by Stephan Moccio & Jorane
2015	Clubs	Ritmo De Bulerias De Cadiz by El Junco
2015	Ribbon	Tema De Sira, Entre Costuras by Cesar Benito
2014	Hoop	Experience by Ludovico Einaudi
2014	Ball	Aqua by Stephan Moccio & Jorane
2014	Clubs	Ritmo De Bulerias De Cadiz by El Junco
2014	Ribbon	Tema De Sira, Entre Costuras by Cesar Benito
2013	Hoop	Experience by Ludovico Einaudi
2013	Ball	Aqua by Stephan Moccio & Jorane
2013	Clubs	Ritmo De Bulerias De Cadiz by El Junco
2013	Ribbon	Barrio San Miguel by Gino D'Auri
2012	Clubs	Un tiro al aire by Camaron de la isla
2012	Hoop	Kalki by E.S.Pothumus
2012	Ball	Lejos music from 500 Motivaciones by Ensemble Nuevo Tango
2012	Ribbon	This I love by Vika Yermovleva
2011	Clubs	Un tiro al aire by Camaron de la isla
2011	Hoop	Kalki by E.S.Pothumus
2011	Ball	Lejos music from 500 Motivaciones by Ensemble Nuevo Tango
2011	Ribbon	This I love by Vika Yermovleva
2010	Rope	
2010	Hoop	Kalki by E.S.Pothumus
2010	Ball	Impromptu music from Gracefully by Giovanni
2010	Ribbon	This I love by Vika Yermovleva
2009	Rope	Los Tangueros music from Orquesta del Plata (Bajofondo Tango Club)
2009	Hoop	Rabbits in the Pea Patch by Maceo Parker
2009	Ball	Impromptu music from Gracefully by Giovanni
2009	Ribbon	This I love by Vika Yermovleva
2008	Rope	Los Tangueros music from Orquesta del Plata (Bajofondo Tango Club)
2008	Hoop	Rabbits in the Pea Patch by Maceo Parker
2008	Clubs	Handel's Sarabande by Maksim
2008	Ribbon	I Will Always Love You by Whitney Houston
2007	Rope	Hungarian Rhapsody music from Virtuoso by Edvin Marton
2007	Hoop	Summertime / Summertime by Angelique Kadjo / Kenny G, George Benson
2007	Clubs	From Within by Michel Camilo
2007	Ribbon	
2006	Rope	Pena (Serbia) de Šaban Bajramović
2006	Ball	Summertime / Summertime by Angelique Kadjo / Kenny G, George Benson
2006	Clubs	Conte d'Amour (Mouvements du desir) by Zbigniew Preisner
2006	Ribbon	Caravan by Michel Camilo / Jorge Pardo
2005	Rope	
2005	Ball	Tamally Maak by Amr Diab, and Inshalla (Ya Salam) by Angel Tears
2005	Clubs	Por ti by Ruben Moran
2005	Ribbon	Caravan by Michel Camilo / Jorge Pardo
2003	Hoop	?
2003	Ball	Sahara by Bond Girls
2003	Clubs	Pistolero by Juno Reactor
2003	Ribbon	Foo Foo music from Shaman by Carlos Santana
2002	Hoop	Flamenco by Didulya
2002	Ball	Passacaglia by Secret Garden
2002	Clubs	Por ti by Ruben Moran
2002	Rope	Fortuna Imperatrix Mundi: O Fortuna music from Carmina Burana by Carl Orff
2001	Hoop	Carmen by Georges Bizet
2001	Ball	Quidam / Seisouso / Reveil (from Quidam, Cirque du Soleil) by Benoit Jutras
2001	Clubs	Por ti by Ruben Moran
2001	Rope	Fortuna Imperatrix Mundi: O Fortuna music from Carmina Burana by Carl Orff
