= Gemma Royo =

Spanish rhythmic gymnast (born 1975)

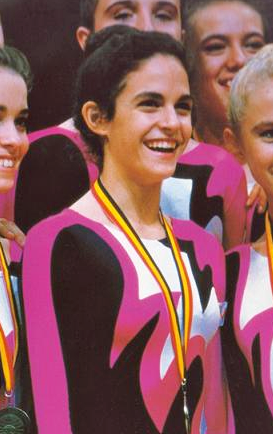

Personal information
- Full name: Gemma Royo Lorte
- Born: 20 March 1975 (age 51) Zaragoza, Spain

Gymnastics career
- Discipline: Rhythmic gymnastics
- Country represented: Spain (1989-1992)
- Club: Club Escuela de Gimnasia Rítmica de Zaragoza
- Head coach: Emilia Boneva
- Assistant coach: Ana Roncero
- Former coaches: Rosa Menor, Paqui Maneus, Cathy Xaudaró, Berta Veiga
- Choreographer: Georgi Neykov
- Retired: yes
Medal record
Event	1st	2nd	3rd
Junior European Championships	0	0	1
European Championships	2	1	3
World Championships	1	3	1
FIG World Cup	0	0	3
Total	3	4	8
Rhythmic Gymnastics
Representing Spain
World Championships
Gold medal – first place	1991 Athens	All-Around
Silver medal – second place	1991 Athens	6 Ribbons
Silver medal – second place	1991 Athens	3 Balls + 3 Ropes
Silver medal – second place	1992 Bruxelles	Group All-Around
Bronze medal – third place	1992 Bruxelles	6 Ribbons
European Championships
Gold medal – first place	1992 Stuttgart	Group All-Around
Gold medal – first place	1992 Stuttgart	3 Balls + 3 Ropes
Silver medal – second place	1990 Gothenburg	12 Clubs
Bronze medal – third place	1990 Gothenburg	All-Around
Bronze medal – third place	1990 Gothenburg	3 Balls + 3 Ropes
Bronze medal – third place	1992 Stuttgart	6 Ribbons
Junior European Championships
Bronze medal – third place	1989 Tenerife	Group All-Around

Gemma Royo Lorte (born 20 March 1975) is a Spanish retired rhythmic gymnast. She was World champion in 1991 and two-time European champion in 1992. The generation of gymnasts that she was part of is known by the nickname "Primeras Chicas de Oro".

== Biography ==
Gemma tool up the sport in 1982 at Club Escuela de Gimnasia Rítmica of Zaragoza. Trained by Chus Garcés, she would participate in several Spanish Championships in different categories: children, pre-junior, junior and first category. In 1987 she got bronze i ex aequo with Rosabel Espinosa in Palma de Mallorca. That same year she also became champion of Aragon and soon after, in the Spanish Group Championships held in Onteniente won another bronze in the children category. In 1988 she was called up for a selection of young promises "Barcelona 92", among them there were some future stars of the Spanish rhythmic gymnastics as Ada Liberio, Edi Moreno, Carmen Acedo, Carolina Pascual, Eider Mendizábal, Rosabel Espinosa, Noelia Fernández and Montse Martín, teammate with whom she would maintain a close friendship.

In 1989 she was called up by the Spanish national team to join the junior group, trained by Rosa Menor, Paqui Maneus, Cathy Xaudaró and Berta Veiga. She participated in the Junior European Championships in Tenerife, winning the bronze medal together to the rest of the team, made up of Carmen Acedo, Noelia Fernández, Ruth Goñi, Eider Mendizábal and Montserrat Martín, with Cristina Chapuli and Diana Martín as substitutes.

In late 1989 she was incorporated into the senior group, training about 8 hours a day at the Moscardó Gymnasium in Madrid under the direction of Emilia Boneva and Ana Roncero, who since 1982 had been national group coach and head coach. She would also live with all the members of the team in a house in La Moraleja. She began as a substitute gymnast for the group and would debut as a starter at the 1990 Stuttgart Gymnastic Masters due to a last-minute injury to Montserrat Martín, who three days before the start of the competition, broke a leg when stepping on a ball. Later, again as a substitute, at the European Championships in Gotheburg she won the bronze medal in both the All-Around and with 3 balls & 3 ropes, and the silver with 12 clubs. At the World Cup Final, held that year in Brussels, the group (made up of Montse Martín, Beatriz Barral, Lorea Elso, Teresa Fuster, Arancha Marty and Vanesa Muñiz, with Marta Aberturas as the other substitute) won all three bronze medals. At the Wacoal Cup tournament in Tokyo, held in November, they won overall silver.

In 1991 Gemma became a starter, the two exercises for groups were 6 ribbons for the single-apparatus exercise and 3 balls and 3 ropes for the mixed-apparatus one. Their ribbon exercise used "Tango Jalousie", composed by Jacob Gade, for the music, while their mixed-apparatus one used the song "Campanas" by Víctor Bombi. To choreograph the dance steps of the 6 ribbons exercise, they had the help of Javier "Poty" Castillo, then a dancer with the National Ballet, although the team's usual choreographer was the Bulgarian Georgi Neykov. Before the World Championships, they won gold at the Karlsruhe tournament (ahead of the USSR and Bulgaria) and three bronzes at the Gymnastic Masters in Stuttgart.

On 12 October 1991, the Spanish team (consisting of Gemma, Débora Alonso, Isabel Gómez Pérez, Lorea Elso, Teresa Fuster and Montserrat Martín, with Marta Aberturas and Cristina Chapuli as the substitutes) won gold in the all-around at the World Championships in Athens. This medal was described by the media as historic, since it was the first time that Spain had won the World Championship in rhythmic gymnastics. The next day, they would also win silver in both of the two apparatus finals. After this achievement, at the end of 1991 they would tour in Switzerland.

In 1992 they won silver in a tournament in Karlsruhe, and later they were invited to give an exhibition at one in Corbeil-Essonnes. In June, with new exercises, they participated in the European Championships in Stuttgart, where they shared the gold medal in the all-around with the Russian team, in addition to winning another gold in the 3 balls and 3 ropes final and bronze in 6 ribbons. Gemma did not compete in the 1992 Olympic Games because rhythmic gymnastics was an individual-only sport at the Olympics at that time, although she participated with the rest of her teammates in the opening ceremony, leading the parade of participating nations.

Shortly after, they won gold at both the Asvo Cup in Austria and the Alfred Vogel Cup in the Netherlands, where they also won silver in 6 ribbons and gold in 3 balls and 3 ropes. Fuster and Gómez were injured before the World Championships in Brussels, which took place in November 1992. They were kept on the team as substitutes, but in the competing lineup were replaced by Alicia Martín, Cristina Martínez and Bárbara Plaza. In this competition, the team won silver in the All-Around, with their score just one tenth of a point away from allowing them to retain the world title they had won the previous year. In addition, on November 22 they won bronze in the 6 ribbons final and were 8th with 3 balls and 3 ropes. After this, Gemma retired from competition, as would the rest of the group that had been world champion in Athens the previous year.

In 1992, Gemma also received the Medal of Sports Merit from the General Council of Aragon along with his former teammate Marta Aberturas.

After her retirement, she focused on her telecommunications engineering studies while collaborating with her club in Zaragoza as a school and national level coach, winning the bronze medal in the children category at the Spanish Championships of Sets held in Alicante in 1993. After graduating Gemma abandoned rhythmic gymnastics. She currently works at an international telecommunications company in Madrid.

In September she traveled with several former gymnasts from the Spanish team to the World Championships in Sofia to meet again with the former national team coach Emilia Boneva, and a tribute dinner was also organized in her honor. After Boneva's death on 20 September 2019, Gemma and other former national gymnasts gathered to pay tribute to her during the Euskalgym held on 16 November 2019. The event took place before 8,500 attendees at the Bilbao Exhibition Center de Baracaldo and was followed by a dinner in Boneva's honor.
