= Lorea Elso =

Spanish former rhythmic gymnast

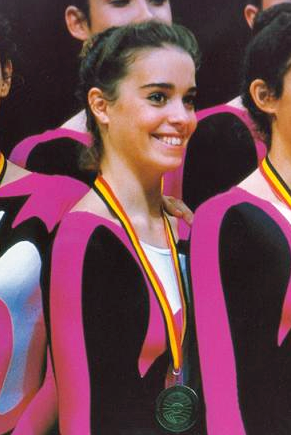

Personal information
- Full name: María Flor Elso Torralba
- Born: 8 June 1973 (age 53) Pamplona, Spain

Gymnastics career
- Discipline: Rhythmic gymnastics
- Country represented: Spain (1988-1992)
- Club: S.C.D.R. Anaitasuna
- Head coaches: Ana Roncero, Emilia Boneva
- Choreographer: Georgi Neykov
- Retired: yes
Medal record
Event	1st	2nd	3rd
European Championships	0	1	2
World Championships	1	2	3
FIG World Cup	0	0	3
Total	1	3	7
Rhythmic Gymnastics
Representing Spain
World Championships
Gold medal – first place	1991 Athens	All-Around
Silver medal – second place	1991 Athens	6 Ribbons
Silver medal – second place	1991 Athens	3 Balls + 3 Ropes
Bronze medal – third place	1989 Sarajevo	All-Around
Bronze medal – third place	1989 Sarajevo	12 Clubs
Bronze medal – third place	1989 Sarajevo	3 Hoops + 3 Ribbons
European Championships
Silver medal – second place	1990 Gothenburg	12 Clubs
Bronze medal – third place	1990 Gothenburg	All-Around
Bronze medal – third place	1990 Gothenburg	3 Balls + 3 Ropes

María Flor Elso Torralba (born 8 June 1973), known as Lorea Elso, is a former Spanish rhythmic gymnast. She was World champion in 1991 and two-time European champion in 1992. The generation of gymnasts that she was part of is known by the nickname "Primeras Chicas de Oro". Elso is tied with Teresa Fuster, Marta Baldó and Estela Giménez for the Spanish rhythmic gymnast with the most medals in World Championships, with a total of 8.

== Biography ==
Elso started rhythmic gymnastics when she was 9 years old at the Ivanka Chakarova Club in Pamplona. In 1988, after this club disbanded, she joined the Anaitasuna Recreational Sports Cultural Society in the same city.

In 1988, she was invited by Emilia Boneva to join the national rhythmic gymnastics team of Spain as part of the group, which she would be a member of until 1992. During that time, she would train about 8 hours a day at the Moscardó Gymnasium in Madrid under the direction of Boneva herself along with that of Ana Roncero, who since 1982 had been national group coach and head coach. She would also live with all the members of the team in a house in La Moraleja.

At the beginning of 1989, she won three silver medals in the DTB-Pokal Karlsruhe tournament. Shortly after, she and the other members of the group (Beatriz Barral, Bito Fuster, Arancha Marty, Mari Carmen Moreno and Vanesa Muñiz, with Marta Aberturas and Nuria Arias as the substitutes) won three bronze medals at the World Championships in Sarajevo. They reached the podium both in the all-around and in the two finals, 12 clubs and 3 ropes and 3 ribbons.

In 1990, the European Championships in Gothenburg took place, where she won a bronze medal in the all-around, as well as a silver in the 12 clubs final and another bronze in the 3 ropes and 3 ribbons final. At the World Cup Final, held that year in Brussels, the group (made up of Elso, Beatriz Barral, Bito Fuster, Montse Martín, Arancha Marty and Vanesa Muñiz, with Marta Aberturas and Gemma Royo as the substitutes) won all three bronze medals. At the Wacoal Cup tournament in Tokyo, held in November, they won overall silver.

In 1991, Lorea was named captain of the national team.

In 1991, the two exercises for groups were 6 ribbons for the single-apparatus exercise and 3 balls and 3 ropes for the mixed-apparatus one. Their ribbon exercise used "Tango Jalousie", composed by Jacob Gade, for the music, while their mixed-apparatus one used the song "Campanas" by Víctor Bombi. To choreograph the dance steps of the 6 ribbons exercise, they had the help of Javier "Poty" Castillo, then a dancer with the National Ballet, although the team's usual choreographer was the Bulgarian Georgi Neykov. Before the World Championships, they won gold at the Karlsruhe tournament (ahead of the USSR and Bulgaria) and three bronzes at the Gymnastic Masters in Stuttgart.

On 12 October 1991, the Spanish team (consisting of Elso, Débora Alonso, Isabel Gómez Pérez, Bito Fuster, Montse Martín and Gemma Royo, with Marta Aberturas and Cristina Chapuli as the substitutes) won gold in the all-around at the World Championships in Athens. This medal was described by the media as historic, since it was the first time that Spain had won the World Championship in rhythmic gymnastics. The next day, they would also win silver in both of the two apparatus finals. After this achievement, at the end of 1991 they would tour in Switzerland.

In 1992 they won silver in a tournament in Karlsruhe, and later they were invited to give an exhibition at one in Corbeil-Essonnes. In June, with new exercises, they participated in the European Championships in Stuttgart, where they shared the gold medal in the all-around with the Russian team, in addition to winning another gold in the 3 balls and 3 ropes final and bronze in 6 ribbons. Elso did not compete in the 1992 Olympic Games because rhythmic gymnastics was an individual-only sport at the Olympics at that time, although she participated with the rest of her teammates in the opening ceremony, leading the parade of participating nations.

Shortly after, they won gold at both the Asvo Cup in Austria and the Alfred Vogel Cup in the Netherlands, where they also won silver in 6 ribbons and gold in 3 balls and 3 ropes. Gómez and Fuster were injured before the World Championships in Brussels, which took place in November 1992. They were kept on the team as substitutes, but in the competing lineup were replaced by Alicia Martín, Cristina Martínez and Bárbara Plaza. In this competition, the team won silver in the all-around, with their score just one tenth of a point away from allowing them to retain the world title they had won the previous year. In addition, on November 22 they won bronze in the 6 ribbons final and were 8th with 3 balls and 3 ropes. After this, Lorea would retire from competition, as would the rest of the group that had been world champion in Athens the previous year.

She was awarded the Sports Award of the Government of Navarra for the best Navarrese athlete of the year in 1989 and 1991.

After her retirement, she obtained the title of National Trainer and graduate from Complutense University with a degree in information sciences. She works in the audiovisual sector, where she has worked in film production companies and exhibitors. She currently works in Madrid at the film distributor Golem.

On 25 May 2017, she was the master of ceremonies at the presentation of the book Pinceladas de Rítmica at the Consejo Superior de Deportes headquarters. The book is a history of rhythmic gymnastics written by her former teammate Montse Martín and Manel Martín. On December 16, 2017, Elso met with other former gymnasts from the national team to pay tribute to former national team coach Ana Roncero.

In September 2018, she traveled with several former gymnasts from the Spanish team to the World Championships in Sofia to meet again with the former national team coach Emilia Boneva, and a tribute dinner was also organized in Boneva's honor. After Boneva's death on 20 September 2019, Lorea and other former national gymnasts gathered to pay tribute to her during the Euskalgym held on 16 November 2019. The event took place before 8,500 attendees at the Bilbao Exhibition Center de Baracaldo and was followed by a dinner in Boneva's honor.

== Legacy and influence ==
The national rhythmic gymnastics group of 1991 won the first world title for Spanish rhythmic gymnastics at the World Championships in Athens. It was the first time a rhythmic gymnastics team from a Western country had prevailed over those from Eastern European countries. Reviews of this milestone appear in books such as Gimnasia rítmica deportiva: aspectos y evolución (1995) by Aurora Fernández del Valle, Enredando en la memoria (2015) by Paloma del Río, and Pinceladas de rítmica (2017) by Montse and Manel Martín.
