= Montserrat Martín =

Spanish rhythmic gymnast, artist, actress and dancer (born 1974)

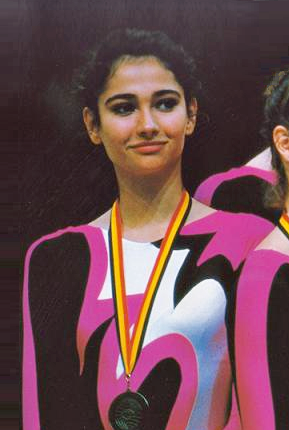
- Martín in 1992

Personal information
- Full name: Montserrat Martín López
- Nickname: Montse
- Born: 2 December 1974 (age 51) Lleida, Catalonia, Francoist Spain

Gymnastics career
- Discipline: Rhythmic gymnastics
- Country represented: Spain (1989–1992)
- Club: Sicoris Club / Escuela Catalana de Gimnasia Rítmica
- Head coach: Emilia Boneva
- Assistant coach: Ana Roncero
- Former coaches: Rosa Menor, Paqui Maneus, Cathy Xaudaró, Berta Veiga
- Choreographer: Georgi Neykov
- Retired: yes
Medal record
Event	1st	2nd	3rd
Junior European Championships	0	0	1
European Championships	2	1	3
World Championships	1	3	1
FIG World Cup	0	0	3
Total	3	4	8
Rhythmic Gymnastics
Representing Spain
World Championships
Gold medal – first place	1991 Athens	All-Around
Silver medal – second place	1991 Athens	6 Ribbons
Silver medal – second place	1991 Athens	3 Balls + 3 Ropes
Silver medal – second place	1992 Bruxelles	Group All-Around
Bronze medal – third place	1992 Bruxelles	6 Ribbons
European Championships
Gold medal – first place	1992 Stuttgart	Group All-Around
Gold medal – first place	1992 Stuttgart	3 Balls + 3 Ropes
Silver medal – second place	1990 Gothenburg	12 Clubs
Bronze medal – third place	1990 Gothenburg	All-Around
Bronze medal – third place	1990 Gothenburg	3 Balls + 3 Ropes
Bronze medal – third place	1992 Stuttgart	6 Ribbons
Junior European Championships
Bronze medal – third place	1989 Tenerife	Group All-Around

Montserrat "Montse" Martín López (born 2 December 1974) is a retired Spanish rhythmic gymnast, graphic designer, painter, illustrator, actress and dancer. She was World champion in 1991 and two-time European champion in 1992. The generation of gymnasts that she was part of is known by the nickname "Primeras Chicas de Oro".

== Biography ==
Montserrat took up the sport at the Sicoris Club of Lleida at age 6, being trained by Merçè Humedas and Conchita Durán. Later she trained with the Catalan School of Rhythmic Gymnastics in Manresa. In December 1988 she was proclaimed Spanish group champion in the 1st category in Playa de Aro. This team was coached by Berta Veiga and the future national team gymnast Carmen Acedo was also in it.

In 1989 she was called up by the Spanish national team to join the junior group, trained by Rosa Menor, Paqui Maneus, Cathy Xaudaró and Berta Veiga. She participated in the Junior European Championships in Tenerife, winning the bronze medal together to the rest of the team, made up of Carmen Acedo, Noelia Fernández, Ruth Goñi, Eider Mendizábal and Gemma Royo, with Cristina Chapuli and Diana Martín as substitutes.

In late 1989 she was incorporated into the senior group, training about 8 hours a day at the Moscardó Gymnasium in Madrid under the direction of Emilia Boneva and Ana Roncero, who since 1982 had been national group coach and head coach. She would also live with all the members of the team in a house in La Moraleja.

In 1990, three days before the start of the Gymnastic Masters in Stuttgart, she suffered an injury when she broke her leg after stepping on a ball. Later, at the European Championships in Gotheburg she won the bronze medal in both the All-Around and with 3 balls & 3 ropes, and the silver with 12 clubs. At the World Cup Final, held that year in Brussels, the group (made up of Montse, Beatriz Barral, Lorea Elso, Teresa Fuster, Arancha Marty and Vanesa Muñiz, with Marta Aberturas and Gemma Royo as the substitutes) won all three bronze medals. At the Wacoal Cup tournament in Tokyo, held in November, they won overall silver.

In 1991, the two exercises for groups were 6 ribbons for the single-apparatus exercise and 3 balls and 3 ropes for the mixed-apparatus one. Their ribbon exercise used "Tango Jalousie", composed by Jacob Gade, for the music, while their mixed-apparatus one used the song "Campanas" by Víctor Bombi. To choreograph the dance steps of the 6 ribbons exercise, they had the help of Javier "Poty" Castillo, then a dancer with the National Ballet, although the team's usual choreographer was the Bulgarian Georgi Neykov. Before the World Championships, they won gold at the Karlsruhe tournament (ahead of the USSR and Bulgaria) and three bronzes at the Gymnastic Masters in Stuttgart.

On 12 October 1991, the Spanish team (consisting of Montserrat, Débora Alonso, Isabel Gómez Pérez, Lorea Elso, Teresa Fuster and Gemma Royo, with Marta Aberturas and Cristina Chapuli as the substitutes) won gold in the all-around at the World Championships in Athens. This medal was described by the media as historic, since it was the first time that Spain had won the World Championship in rhythmic gymnastics. The next day, they would also win silver in both of the two apparatus finals. After this achievement, at the end of 1991 they would tour in Switzerland.

In 1992 they won silver in a tournament in Karlsruhe, and later they were invited to give an exhibition at one in Corbeil-Essonnes. In June, with new exercises, they participated in the European Championships in Stuttgart, where they shared the gold medal in the all-around with the Russian team, in addition to winning another gold in the 3 balls and 3 ropes final and bronze in 6 ribbons. Montserrat did not compete in the 1992 Olympic Games because rhythmic gymnastics was an individual-only sport at the Olympics at that time, although she participated with the rest of her teammates in the opening ceremony, leading the parade of participating nations.

Shortly after, they won gold at both the Asvo Cup in Austria and the Alfred Vogel Cup in the Netherlands, where they also won silver in 6 ribbons and gold in 3 balls and 3 ropes. Fuster and Gómez were injured before the World Championships in Brussels, which took place in November 1992. They were kept on the team as substitutes, but in the competing lineup were replaced by Alicia Martín, Cristina Martínez and Bárbara Plaza. In this competition, the team won silver in the All-Around, with their score just one tenth of a point away from allowing them to retain the world title they had won the previous year. In addition, on November 22 they won bronze in the 6 ribbons final and were 8th with 3 balls and 3 ropes. After this, Montserrat would retire from competition, as would the rest of the group that had been world champion in Athens the previous year.

After her retirement, he studied fashion design in Llrida and, later, Graphic Design at the IDEP School in Barcellona. She worked for 5 years as a graphic designer at the advertising agency Ados Comunicación and later at tresDbcn. In recent years, Montse has alternated her role as a freelance designer, painter and illustrator in plays and musicals, with work as an actress and dancer. Among her latest projects in the field of dance and theater are The La danza de los dos pianos (2009), directed by her brother Manel Martín and with the presence of the former international gymnast from Lleida Esther Escolar as well, or Conmovidas en blanco y negro (2009), directed and played by her with Elisenda Selvas. In 2010 she appeared in a television advert for Baileys broadcast in the United Kingdom.

In October 2014, the first two volumes of Olympia, a series of children's stories illustrated in watercolor by Montse and written by former gymnast Almudena Cid that are inspired by the latter's sporting life, were published. New volumes continued to be released every few months, with the last volume illustrated by Montse being published in 2017.

On October 26, 2016, Montse announced the crowdfunding campaign to publish her book Pinceladas de rítmica, written with her brother Manel, in which they develop a journey through the history of rhythmic gymnastics through illustrations, biographies and analysis artistic performances of 50 outstanding gymnasts. Among them are Anelia Ralenkova, Diliana Gueorguieva, Marta Bobo, Marina Lobach, Oksana Kostina, Ana Bautista, Elena Shamatulskaya, Carmen Acedo, Maria Petrova, Carolina Pascual, Kateryna Serebrianskaya, Olena Vitrichenko, Eva Serrano, Olga Gontar, Almudena Cid, Alina Kabaeva, Anna Bessonova, Yevgeniya Kaneva, Alina Maksymenko, Hanna Rizatdinova, Margarita Mamun and Yana Kudryavtseva. The book was presented on May 25, 2017, at the CSD headquarters. The presentation was chaired by Montse and Manel Martín, as well as the CSD Sports Director, Jaime González, and Jesús Carballo, president of the Royal Spanish Gymnastics Federation. The event was attended by numerous former Spanish gymnasts such as Lorea Elso (who served as presenter), Bito Fuster, Gemma Royo, Carolina Pascual, Carmen Acedo, Ana Bautista, Eva Jiménez, Arancha Marty, María Martín, Ana Roncero, Ana María Pelaz, Isabel Pagán and Sara Bayón, the then senior group coach Anna Baranova, and part of the Spanish junior group. On December 16, 2017, Martín met with other former gymnasts from the national team to pay tribute to former national team coach Ana Roncero.

In September she traveled with several former gymnasts from the Spanish team to the World Championships in Sofia to meet again with the former national team coach Emilia Boneva, and a tribute dinner was also organized in her honor. After Boneva's death on 20 September 2019, Montse and other former national gymnasts gathered to pay tribute to her during the Euskalgym held on 16 November 2019. The event took place before 8,500 attendees at the Bilbao Exhibition Center de Baracaldo and was followed by a dinner in Boneva's honor.
