= Cristina Chapuli =

Spanish rhythmic gymnast (born 1975)

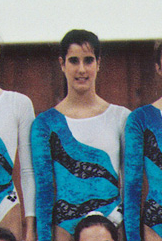

Personal information
- Full name: Cristina Chapuli Egido
- Born: 18 January 1975 (age 51) Alicante, Spain

Gymnastics career
- Discipline: Rhythmic gymnastics
- Country represented: Spain (1989-1991)
- Club: Club Atlético Montemar
- Head coach: Emilia Boneva
- Assistant coach: Ana Roncero
- Former coaches: Rosa Menor, Paqui Maneus, Cathy Xaudaró, Berta Veiga
- Choreographer: Georgi Neykov
- Retired: yes
Medal record
Event	1st	2nd	3rd
Junior European Championships	0	0	1
World Championships	1	2	0
Total	1	2	1
Rhythmic Gymnastics
Representing Spain
World Championships
Gold medal – first place	1991 Athens	All-Around
Silver medal – second place	1991 Athens	6 Ribbons
Silver medal – second place	1991 Athens	3 Balls + 3 Ropes
Junior European Championships
Bronze medal – third place	1989 Tenerife	Group All-Around

Cristina Chapuli Egido (born 18 January 1975) is a retired Spanish rhythmic gymnast. She was World champion in 1991. The generation of gymnasts that she was part of is known by the nickname "Primeras Chicas de Oro".

== Biography ==
Cristina started her sport career at the Club Atlético Montemar in her native Alicante, a club that saw the rise of other prominent gymnasts such as Carolina Pascual, Marta Baldó and Estela Giménez.

In 1989 she was called up by the Spanish national team to join the junior group, trained by Rosa Menor, Paqui Maneus, Cathy Xaudaró and Berta Veiga. In the Junior European Championships in Tenerife, the group made up of Carmen Acedo, Noelia Fernández, Ruth Goñi, Eider Mendizábal, Montserrat Martín and Gemma Royo, with Cristina and Diana Martín as substitutes, won bronze in the group All-Around.

In late 1989 she was incorporated into the senior group, training about eight hours a day at the Moscardó Gymnasium in Madrid under the direction of Emilia Boneva and Ana Roncero, who since 1982 had been national group coach and head coach. She would also live with all the members of the team in a house in La Moraleja.

In 1990 Chapuli would be a substitute gymnast for the team, remaining in Madrid training as she was not called to competitions such as the European Championships or the World Cup. Of the four substitutes in the team that year, only two could travel to the competitions. The starting team that year was Beatriz Barral, Lorea Elso, Teresa Fuster, Montserrat Martín, Arancha Marty and Vanesa Muñiz, with Marta Aberturas and Gemma Royo being substitutes. Débora Alonso was also part of the team, but like Cristina she was not called to the competitions that year.

In 1991 she a substitute gymnast, the two exercises for groups were six ribbons for the single-apparatus exercise and three balls and three ropes for the mixed-apparatus one. Their ribbon exercise used "Tango Jalousie", composed by Jacob Gade, for the music, while their mixed-apparatus one used the song "Campanas" by Víctor Bombi. To choreograph the dance steps of the six ribbons exercise, they had the help of Javier "Poty" Castillo, then a dancer with the National Ballet, although the team's usual choreographer was the Bulgarian Georgi Neykov. Before the World Championships, they won gold at the Karlsruhe tournament (ahead of the Soviet Union and Bulgaria) and three bronzes at the Gymnastic Masters in Stuttgart.

On 12 October 1991, the Spanish team (consisting of Montserrat Martín, Débora Alonso, Isabel Gómez Pérez, Lorea Elso, Teresa Fuster and Gemma Royo, with Cristina and Marta Aberturas as the substitutes) won gold in the all-around at the World Championships in Athens. This medal was described by the media as historic, since it was the first time that Spain had won the World Championship in rhythmic gymnastics. The next day, they would also win silver in both of the two apparatus finals. After this achievement, at the end of 1991 they would tour in Switzerland.

She retired at the end of the year. After Boneva's death on 20 September 2019, Cristina and other former national gymnasts gathered to pay tribute to her during the Euskalgym held on 16 November 2019. The event took place before 8,500 attendees at the Bilbao Exhibition Center de Baracaldo and was followed by a dinner in Boneva's honor.

== Legacy and influence ==
The national rhythmic gymnastics group of 1991 won the first world title for Spanish rhythmic gymnastics at the World Championships in Athens. It was the first time a rhythmic gymnastics team from a Western country had prevailed over those from Eastern European countries. Reviews of this milestone appear in books such as Gimnasia rítmica deportiva: aspectos y evolución (1995) by Aurora Fernández del Valle, Enredando en la memoria (2015) by Paloma del Río and Pinceladas de rítmica (2017) by Montse and Manel Martín.
