= Isabel Gómez Pérez =

Spanish former rhythmic gymnast

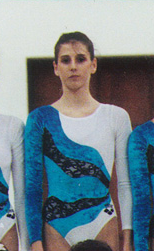

Personal information
- Born: 28 February 1976 (age 50) Santa Cruz de Tenerife, Spain

Gymnastics career
- Discipline: Rhythmic gymnastics
- Country represented: Spain (1990-1992)
- Club: Escuela Municipal de Tenerife
- Head coach: Emilia Boneva
- Assistant coach: Ana Roncero
- Choreographer: Georgi Neykov
- Retired: yes
Medal record
Event	1st	2nd	3rd
European Championships	2	0	1
World Championships	1	3	1
Total	3	3	2
Rhythmic Gymnastics
Representing Spain
World Championships
Gold medal – first place	1991 Athens	All-Around
Silver medal – second place	1991 Athens	6 Ribbons
Silver medal – second place	1991 Athens	3 Balls + 3 Ropes
Silver medal – second place	1992 Brussels	All-Around
Bronze medal – third place	1992 Brussels	6 Ribbons
European Championships
Gold medal – first place	1992 Stuttgart	All-Around
Gold medal – first place	1992 Stuttgart	3 Balls + 3 Ropes
Bronze medal – third place	1992 Stuttgart	6 Ribbons

Isabel Gómez Pérez (born 28 February 1976) is a former Spanish rhythmic gymnast. She is a European and World medalist.

== Biography ==
She began rhythmic gymnastics at the age of 8 at the Tenerife Municipal School. With her club, she participated in several Spanish Championships and Spanish Cups, both individually and in groups. In the Spanish Group Championship, she was fourth in the pre-junior category in 1987. She won silver in the second category in 1988, and she then won gold in the first category in both 1989 and 1990. In 1990, as an individual, she was fourth overall and won bronze with hoop in the first category. At the end of 1990, she was invited by Emilia Boneva to join the national rhythmic gymnastics team of Spain, of which she would be a part until 1992.

In 1991, the two exercises for groups were 6 ribbons for the single-apparatus exercise and 3 balls and 3 ropes for the mixed-apparatus one. Their ribbon exercise used "Tango Jalousie", composed by Jacob Gade, for the music, while their mixed-apparatus one used the song "Campanas" by Víctor Bombi. To choreograph the dance steps of the 6 ribbons exercise, they had the help of Javier "Poty" Castillo, then a dancer with the National Ballet, although the team's usual choreographer was the Bulgarian Georgi Neykov. Before the World Championships, they won gold in the Karlsruhe tournament (ahead of the USSR and Bulgaria) and three bronzes at the Gymnastic Masters in Stuttgart.

On October 12 of that year, the Spanish group (consisting Gómez, Débora Alonso, Lorea Elso, Teresa Fuster, Montserrat Martín and Gemma Royo, with Marta Aberturas and Cristina Chapuli as the substitutes) won the gold medal in the all-around of the World Championship in Athens. This medal was described by the media as historic, since it was the first time that Spain had won the World Championships in rhythmic gymnastics. The next day, they would also win silver in the two apparatus finals. After this achievement, at the end of 1991 they would tour Switzerland.

In 1992 they won silver in a tournament in Karlsruhe, and later they were invited to give an exhibition at one in Corbeil-Essonnes. In June, with new exercises, they participated in the European Championships in Stuttgart, where they shared the gold medal in the all-around with the Russian team, in addition to winning another gold in the 3 balls and 3 ropes final and bronze in 6 ribbons She did not compete in the 1992 Olympic Games because rhythmic gymnastics was an individual-only sport at the Olympics at that time, although she participated with the rest of her teammates in the opening ceremony, leading the parade of participating nations.

Shortly after, they won gold at both the Asvo Cup in Austria and the Alfred Vogel Cup in the Netherlands, where they also won silver in 6 ribbons and gold in 3 balls and 3 ropes. An injury led to Gómez becoming a substitute for the World Championships in Brussels, which took place in November 1992. Bito Fuster was also injured, and the two of them were kept as the group subtitues while Alicia Martín, Cristina Martínez and Bárbara Plaza replaced them in the competing lineup. In this competition, the team won silver in the all-around, with their score just one tenth of a point away from allowing them to retain the world title they had won the previous year. In addition, on November 22 they won bronze in the 6 ribbons final and were 8th with 3 balls and 3 ropes After this, Isabel retired from competition, as would the rest of the group that had been world champions in Athens the previous year.

After Emilia Boneva's death on 20 September 2019, Gómez and other former national gymnasts gathered to pay tribute to her during the Euskalgym held on 16 November 2019, the event took place before 8,500 attendees at the Bilbao Exhibition Center de Baracaldo and was followed by a dinner in Boneva's honor.
