= Teresa Fuster =

Spanish rhythmic gymnast

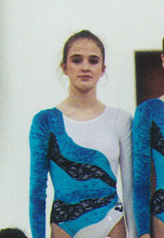

Personal information
- Full name: María Teresa Fuster Amades
- Nickname: Bito
- National team: Spain
- Born: 28 October 1974 (age 51) Tarragona, Spain
- Occupation: University professor
- Years active: Rhythmic gymnastics 1988-1992, rugby ?-1998
- Spouse: Ramón Planes

Sport
- Sport: Rhythmic Gymnastics, Rugby
- Club: Club Gimnàstic de Tarragona / INEF Barcelona
- Coached by: Emilia Boneva
Medal record
Event	1st	2nd	3rd
European Championships	0	1	2
World Championships	1	2	3
FIG World Cup	0	0	3
Total	1	3	7
Rhythmic Gymnastics
Representing Spain
World Championships
Gold medal – first place	1991 Athens	All-Around
Silver medal – second place	1991 Athens	6 Ribbons
Silver medal – second place	1991 Athens	3 Balls + 3 Ropes
Bronze medal – third place	1989 Sarajevo	All-Around
Bronze medal – third place	1989 Sarajevo	12 Clubs
Bronze medal – third place	1989 Sarajevo	3 Hoops + 3 Ribbons
European Championships
Silver medal – second place	1990 Gothenburg	12 Clubs
Bronze medal – third place	1990 Gothenburg	All-Around
Bronze medal – third place	1990 Gothenburg	3 Balls + 3 Ropes

María Teresa Fuster Amades (born 28 October 1974), also known as Bito Fuster or Teresa Fuster, is a retired Spanish rhythmic gymnast. She was World champion in 1991 and two-time European champion in 1992. The generation of gymnasts that she was part of is known by the nickname "Primeras Chicas de Oro". Among Spanish rhythmic gymnasts' achieving World Championships Fuster is with 8 medals tied with Lorea Elso, Marta Baldó and Estela Giménez. She was also part of the Spain women's rugby national team.

== Personal life ==
She is married to Ramón Planes, a football club leader; they have 3 children.

== Biography ==
Having 4 siblings, she took up rhythmic gymnastics at the Club Gimnàstic de Tarragona, after trying other sports like athletics and tennis. In 1985 she competed in her first Spanish Championships in Cádiz. At 13, in 1988, she was called up by Emilia Boneva to the Spain national team. At the Moscardó Gymnasium in Madrid, she would for about 8 hours daily train under Boneva and Ana Roncero, both since 1982 were respectively national team or head coach. She also was a housemate with the team in La Moraleja.

Early in 1989, she won three silver medals in the DTB-Pokal Karlsruhe tournament. This was followed with Beatriz Barral, Lorea Elso, Arancha Marty, Mari Carmen Moreno and Vanesa Muñiz (Marta Aberturas and Nuria Arias as substitutes) winning three bronze medals at the World Championships in Sarajevo. They reached the podium both in the all-around and in the two finals, 12 clubs and 3 ropes and 3 ribbons.

At the European Championships in Gotheburg, she medaled: a bronze medal in the all-around, a silver in the 12 clubs final, and a bronze in the 3 ropes and 3 ribbons final. At the World Cup Final, held that year in Brussels, the group (made up of Fuster, Beatriz Barral, Lorea Elso, Montserrat Martín, Arancha Marty and Vanesa Muñiz, with Marta Aberturas and Gemma Royo as the substitutes) won all three bronze medals. At the Wacoal Cup tournament in Tokyo, held in November, they won overall silver.

In 1991, the two exercises for groups were 6 ribbons for the single-apparatus exercise and 3 balls and 3 ropes for the mixed-apparatus one. Their ribbon exercise used "Tango Jalousie", composed by Jacob Gade, for the music, while their mixed-apparatus one used the song "Campanas" by Víctor Bombi. To choreograph the dance steps of the 6 ribbons exercise, they had the help of Javier "Poty" Castillo, then a dancer with the National Ballet, although the team's usual choreographer was the Bulgarian Georgi Neykov. Before the World Championships, they won gold at the Karlsruhe tournament (ahead of the USSR and Bulgaria) and three bronzes at the Gymnastic Masters in Stuttgart.

On 12 October 1991, the Spanish team (consisting of Fuster, Débora Alonso, Isabel Gómez Pérez, Lorea Elso, Montserrat Martín and Gemma Royo, with Marta Aberturas and Cristina Chapuli as the substitutes) won gold in the all-around at the World Championships in Athens. This medal was described by the media as historic, since it was the first time that Spain had won the World Championship in rhythmic gymnastics. The next day, they would also win silver in both of the two apparatus finals. After this achievement, at the end of 1991 they would tour in Switzerland.

In 1992 they won silver in a tournament in Karlsruhe, and later they were invited to give an exhibition at one in Corbeil-Essonnes. In June, with new exercises, they participated in the European Championships in Stuttgart, where they shared the gold medal in the all-around with the Russian team, in addition to winning another gold in the 3 balls and 3 ropes final and bronze in 6 ribbons. Teresa did not compete in the 1992 Olympic Games because rhythmic gymnastics was an individual-only sport at the Olympics at that time, although she participated with the rest of her teammates in the opening ceremony, leading the parade of participating nations.

Shortly after, they won gold at both the Asvo Cup in Austria and the Alfred Vogel Cup in the Netherlands, where they also won silver in 6 ribbons and gold in 3 balls and 3 ropes. Herself and Gómez were injured before the World Championships in Brussels, which took place in November 1992. They were kept on the team as substitutes, but in the competing lineup were replaced by Alicia Martín, Cristina Martínez and Bárbara Plaza. In this competition, the team won silver in the all-around, with their score just one tenth of a point away from allowing them to retain the world title they had won the previous year. In addition, on November 22 they won bronze in the 6 ribbons final and were 8th with 3 balls and 3 ropes. After this, Teresa would retire from competition, as would the rest of the group that had been world champion in Athens the previous year.

After her retirement she studied at INEF in Barcelona. She also started practicing athletics and aerobic gymnastics for a short time, then deciding to try rugby. She played for four years in the INEF Barcelona's team, making it to the female national team in the 1998 World Cup in Amsterdam, where Spain finished 7th. After that she took a master in Business management.

She was president of the Rhythmic Gymnastics Technical Committee of the Catalan Gymnastics Federation (2000 – 2003), and later professor of Fundamentals of Sports I. Rhythmic Gymnastics and Artistic Gymnastics at the Ramon Llull University of Barcelona between 2002 and 2012, and of Dance and Body Expression in the Degree in Physical Activity and Sports Sciences at the Rovira i Virgili University in Amposta from 2012 to 2015.

On December 16 2017, Fuster met with other former gymnasts from the national team to pay tribute to former national team coach Ana Roncero. After having participated in writing the technical proposal for the candidacy, he was responsible for Sports and Volunteers of the Organizing Committee of the Tarragona 2018 Mediterranean Games, as well as its Educational Project. On June 22, 2018, she was one of those in charge of carrying the Mediterranean flag at the opening ceremony of the Mediterranean Games, in addition to carrying out different logistics and accreditation control tasks in the Mediterranean town during them. In September she traveled with several former gymnasts from the Spanish team to the World Championships in Sofia to meet again with the former national team coach Emilia Boneva, and a tribute dinner was also organized in her honor. After Boneva's death on 20 September 2019, Lorea and other former national gymnasts gathered to pay tribute to her during the Euskalgym held on 16 November 2019. The event took place before 8,500 attendees at the Bilbao Exhibition Center de Baracaldo and was followed by a dinner in Boneva's honor.

As of early 2024 she's a member of the Board of Directors of the Club Gimnàstic de Tarragona and coordinator of the organization's Grana Volunteering program.

== Legacy and influence ==
The national rhythmic gymnastics team of 1991 won the first world title for Spanish rhythmic gymnastics at the World Championships, achieving in this discipline a Western country for the first time overcoming Eastern countries. Reviews of this milestone appear in books such as Gimnasia rítmica deportiva: aspectos y evolución (1995) by Aurora Fernández del Valle, Enredando en la memoria (2015) by Paloma del Río and Pinceladas de rítmica (2017) by Montse and Manel Martín. In April 2018, she donated the leotard with which she became world champion to be permanently displayed at the Nàstic Museum.
