= Débora Alonso =

Spanish former rhythmic gymnast

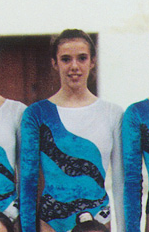

Personal information
- Full name: Débora Alonso Herrero
- Born: 3 June 1974 (age 52) Valladolid, Spain

Gymnastics career
- Discipline: Rhythmic gymnastics
- Country represented: Spain (1989-1992)
- Club: Club Vallisoletano
- Head coaches: Ana Roncero, Emilia Boneva
- Choreographer: Georgi Neykov
- Retired: yes
Medal record
Event	1st	2nd	3rd
European Championships	2	0	1
World Championships	1	3	1
Total	3	3	2
Rhythmic Gymnastics
Representing Spain
World Championships
Gold medal – first place	1991 Athens	All-Around
Silver medal – second place	1991 Athens	6 Ribbons
Silver medal – second place	1991 Athens	3 Balls + 3 Ropes
Silver medal – second place	1992 Brussels	All-Around
Bronze medal – third place	1992 Brussels	6 Ribbons
European Championships
Gold medal – first place	1992 Stuttgart	All-Around
Gold medal – first place	1992 Stuttgart	3 Balls + 3 Ropes
Bronze medal – third place	1992 Stuttgart	6 Ribbons

Débora Alonso Herrero (3 June 1974) is a former Spanish rhythmic gymnast. She was World champion in 1991 with the rest of the Spanish group, in addition to achieving numerous other medals with the Spanish national rhythmic gymnastics team. The generation of gymnasts that she joined is known by the nickname of the "First Golden Girls".

== Career ==
Alonso began rhythmic gymnastics at the Club Vallisoletano. In October 1989, she was invited by Emilia Boneva to join the national rhythmic gymnastics team of Spain, of which she would be a part until 1992.

During the time in which she was a member of the group, she would train about 8 hours a day at the Moscardó Gymnasium in Madrid under the direction of Boneva herself along with that of Ana Roncero, who since 1982 had been national group coach and head coach. She would also live with all the members of the team in a house in La Moraleja. She was a substitute gymnast for the team at most competitions during that time, although she participated in some exhibitions in Spanish cities during the preseason and competed in international tournaments such as Karlsruhe.

In 1990, Alonso would not travel to any competitions but would remain in Madrid to train. Of the four substitutes in the group that year, only two could travel to a competition. The starting team that year was Beatriz Barral, Lorea Elso, Teresa Fuster, Montserrat Martín, Arancha Marty and Vanesa Muñiz, with Marta Aberturas and Gemma Royo as substitutes. Cristina Chapuli was also part of the team, but like Alonso, she was not entered into any competitions that year.

In 1991, the two exercises for groups were 6 ribbons for the single-apparatus exercise and 3 balls and 3 ropes for the mixed-apparatus one. Their ribbon exercise used "Tango Jalousie", composed by Jacob Gade, for the music, while their mixed-apparatus one used the song "Campanas" by Víctor Bombi. To choreograph the dance steps of the 6 ribbons exercise, they had the help of Javier "Poty" Castillo, then a dancer with the National Ballet, although the team's usual choreographer was the Bulgarian Georgi Neykov. Prior to the World Cup, they won gold at the Karlsruhe tournament (ahead of the USSR and Bulgaria) and three bronzes at the Gymnastic Masters in Stuttgart, both in Germany.

On October 12 of that year, the Spanish group won the gold medal in the all-around of the World Championship in Athens. This medal was described by the media as historic, since it was the first time that Spain had won the World Championships in rhythmic gymnastics. On the first day of the all-around, they achieved a score of 19.500 in the exercise with 3 balls and 3 ropes, while on the following day, with their 6 ribbons performance, they obtained a mark of 19.350 (9.90 in composition and 9.45 for execution). With a total score of 38.850, the Spanish team managed to beat the USSR team by 50 thousandths, while North Korea won bronze. The next day, they would also be silver medalists in the two apparatus finals, the 6 ribbon and the 3 balls and 3 ropes finals.

Alonso won these medals together with Lorea Elso, Bito Fuster, Isabel Gómez, Montse Martín and Gemma Royo, with Cristina Chapuli and Marta Aberturas as the group's substitutes. The winning of these would be narrated for Spain through La 2 de TVE by the journalist Paloma del Río. After this achievement, at the end of 1991 they would tour Switzerland.

In 1992 they won silver in a tournament in Karlsruhe, and later they were invited to give an exhibition at one in Corbeil-Essonnes. In June, with new exercises, they participated in the European Championships in Stuttgart, where they shared the gold medal in the all-around with the Russian team, in addition to winning another gold in the 3 balls and 3 ropes final and bronze in 6 ribbons. The group was made up of Alonso, Lorea Elso, Bito Fuster, Isabel Gómez, Montse Martín and Gemma Royo, with the new members Alicia Martín and Cristina Martínez as the substitutes. As rhythmic gymnastics groups were not able to participate in the Olympics at that time, she did not compete at the 1992 Summer Olympics. However, she participated with the rest of her teammates in the opening ceremony, leading the parade of the participating nations.

Shortly after, they won gold at both the Asvo Cup in Austria and the Alfred Vogel Cup in the Netherlands, where they also won silver in 6 ribbons and gold in 3 balls and 3 ropes. Gómez and Fuster were injured before the World Championships in Brussels, which took place in November 1992. They were kept on the team as substitutes, but in the competing lineup were replaced by Alicia Martín, Cristina Martínez and Bárbara Plaza. In this competition, the team won silver in the all-around, with their score just one tenth of a point away from allowing them to retain the world title they had won the previous year. In addition, on November 22 they won bronze in the 6 ribbons final and were 8th with 3 balls and 3 ropes. After this Débora, retired from competitions, as would the rest of the group that had been world champions in Athens in 1991.

After her retirement, she began to teach physical condition, aerobics, ballroom dancing and rhythmic gymnastics in the town of Cervera de Pisuerga, where she lives with her family.

== Legacy and influence ==
The national rhythmic gymnastics group of 1991 won the first world title for Spanish rhythmic gymnastics at the World Championships in Athens. It was the first time a rhythmic gymnastics team from a Western country had prevailed over those from Eastern European countries. Reviews of this milestone appear in books such as Gimnasia rítmica deportiva: aspectos y evolución (1995) by Aurora Fernández del Valle, Enredando en la memoria (2015) by Paloma del Río and Pinceladas de rítmica (2017) by Montse and Manel Martín.
