= Bárbara Plaza =

Spanish rhythmic gymnast (1976–2003)

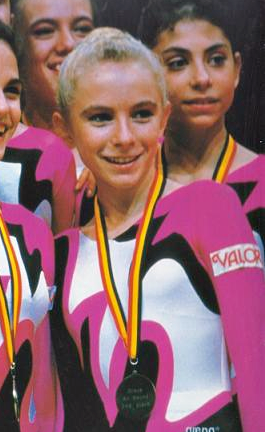

Personal information
- Full name: Bárbara Plaza Hernández
- Born: 26 October 1976 Burjassot, Spain
- Died: 24 August 2003 (aged 26) Valencia, Spain

Gymnastics career
- Discipline: Rhythmic gymnastics
- Country represented: Spain (1991-1993)
- Club: Club Atzar
- Head coach: Ana Roncero
- Assistant coach: María Fernández Ostolaza
- Former coach: Emilia Boneva
- Retired: yes
Medal record
Rhythmic Gymnastics
Representing Spain
World Championships
Silver medal – second place	1992 Bruxelles	Group All-Around
Bronze medal – third place	1992 Bruxelles	6 Ribbons
European Championships
Bronze medal – third place	1993 Bucharest	All-Around
Bronze medal – third place	1993 Bucharest	4 Hoops + 4 Clubs
Junior European Championships
Bronze medal – third place	1991 Lisbon	Team

Bárbara Plaza Hernández (26 October 1976 – 24 August 2003) was a former Spanish rhythmic gymnast. She was a World and European medalist.

== Biography ==
She started rhythmic gymnastics in 1985 when she was 8 years old, joining the Atzar Club in Valencia. In 1990 she was third in the senior category of the Spanish Championships held in Palencia.

In 1991 she was incorporated into the national team, participating in the Junior European Championships in Lisbon where she won team bronze along Carolina Borrell, Rosabel Espinosa and the substitute Peligros Piñero. In November 1991, as a senior individual, he won team gold and silver in the All-Around at the IV Ibero-American Gymnastics Games in Curitiba.

In April 1992 she was 4th at nationals and in July she won team, All-Around and hoop's gold, as well as silver with ball, rope and clubs, at the Ibero-American Gymnastics Games. In mid-1992 she became part of the group, after being called by coach Emilia Boneva because shortly before the World Championships in Brussels, the team's gymnasts Teresa Fuster and Isabel Gómez were injured. Bárbara did not compete in the 1992 Olympic Games because rhythmic gymnastics was an individual-only sport at the Olympics at that time, although she participated with the rest of her teammates in the opening ceremony, leading the parade of participating nations.

Fuster and Gómez's injuries led to a change in the group's lineup: remaining both as alternates and being replaced by Barbara, Alicia Martin and Cristina Martínez. The three would be joined by Deborah Alonso, Lorea Elso, Montserrat Martin and Gemma Royo. In Brussels the group won silver in the All-Around, with their score just one tenth of a point away from allowing them to retain the world title they had won the previous year. In addition, on November 22 they won bronze in the 6 ribbons final and were 8th with 3 balls and 3 ropes.

In 1993, Ana Roncero became national head coach and María Fernández Ostolaza joined as coach of the group. After many of the previous group members retired Bárbara, Carolina Borrell, Cristina Martínez, Maider Olleta, Alicia Martin and Pilar Rodrigo, with María Álvarez, Regina Guati, Lorena Barbadillo, Paula Cabo and Eva Velasco as substitutes, constituted the new national group. At the European Championships in Bucharest, the Spanish group won the bronze medal in the All-Around and with 4 hoops & 4 clubs, taking 6th place with 6 ropes. She retired after the European Championships.

After her retirement in 1993, she dedicated herself to working as a coach at her former club, Club Atzar in Valencia. She died on August 24, 2003, in a motorcycle accident. On October 9, 2004, a tribute was held in her honor.
