= Maider =

Female given name

- Gender: Female
- Language: Basque

Other names
- Related names: Mari

Maider is a Basque feminine given name deriving from a combination of Mari and "eder", which means "beauty" in Basque.

== People ==
- Maider Castillo (born 1976), Spanish footballer
- Maider Esparza (born 1979), Spanish rhythmic gymnast
- Maider Etxebarria (born 1976), Spanish politician
- Maïder Laval (born 1970), French tennis player
- Maider Luengo (born 1980), Spanish field hockey player
- Maider Olleta (born 1977), Spanish rhythmic gymnast
- Maider Tellería (born 1973), Spanish field hockey player
- Maider Unda (born 1977), Spanish freestyle wrestler
