= Maider Olleta =

Spanish rhythmic gymnast (born 1977)

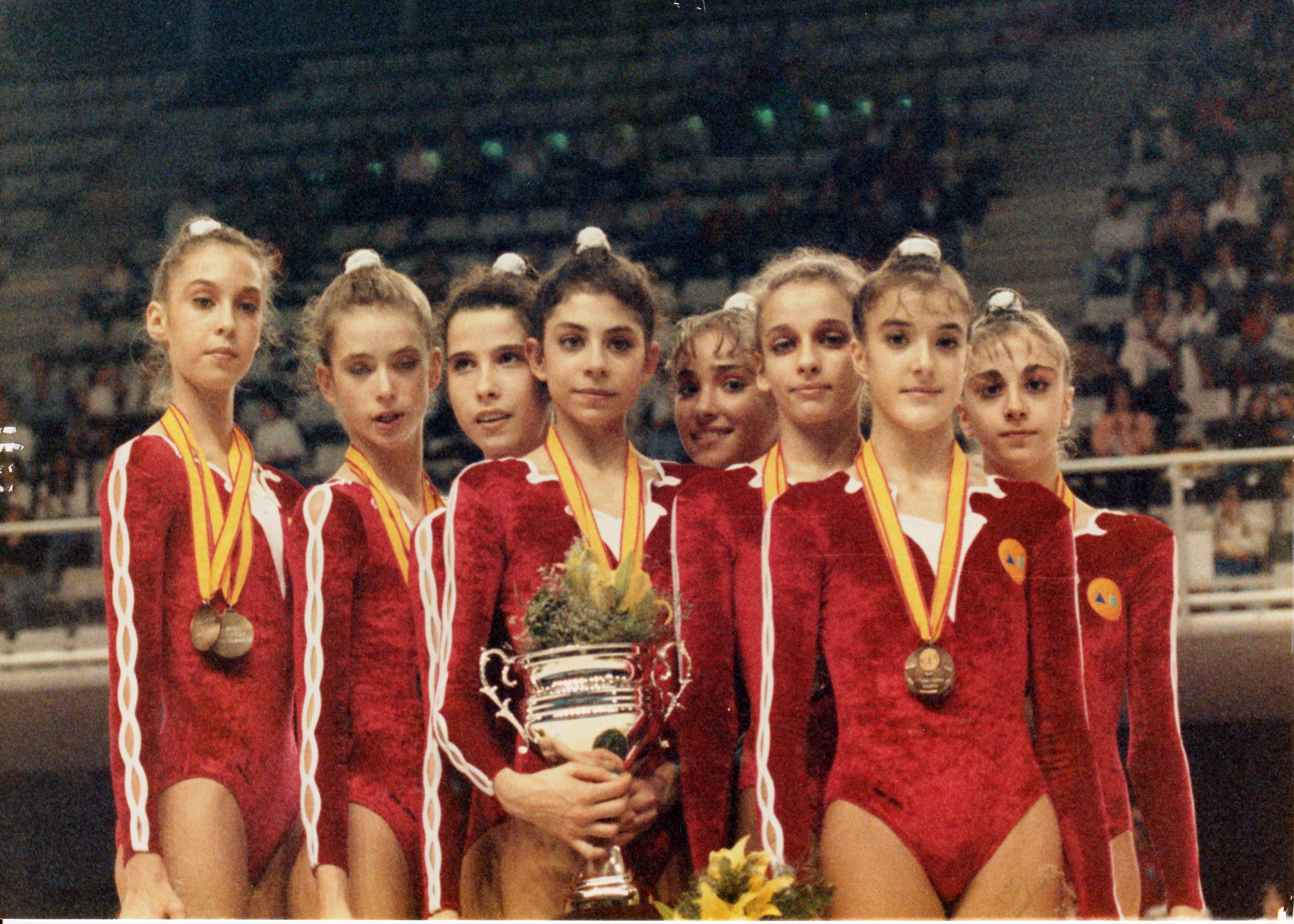
- Olleta (second from left) on the podium of the 1993 Group Masters.

Personal information
- Full name: Maider Olleta Pérez
- Born: 10 October 1977 (age 48) Pamplona, Spain

Gymnastics career
- Discipline: Rhythmic gymnastics
- Country represented: Spain (1993)
- Club: Sociedad Cultural Deportivo Recreativa Anaitasuna
- Head coach: Ana Roncero
- Assistant coach: María Fernández Ostolaza
- Choreographer: Georgi Neykov
- Retired: yes
Medal record
Rhythmic Gymnastics
Representing Spain
European Championships
Bronze medal – third place	1993 Bucharest	All-Around
Bronze medal – third place	1993 Bucharest	4 Hoops + 4 Clubs

Maider Olleta Pérez (born 10 October 1977) is a retired Spanish rhythmic gymnast. She is a double bronze medalist at the European Championships.

== Biography ==
Olleta began doing gymnastics at the age of 3 at the Anaitasuna Recreational Sports Cultural Society of Pamplona, where she continued doing rhythmic gymnastics until she reached the national team in 1993, at the age of 15. In 1992 she won the gold medal with ball in the Spanish Championships of San Sebastián and the silver medal in 1st category in the Spanish Groups Championship in Malaga.

In 1993 she was incorporated into the national senior group. Ana Roncero became national head coach and María Fernández Ostolaza joined as coach of the group. After many of the previous group members retired Maider, Carolina Borrell, Cristina Martínez, Alicia Martín, Bárbara Plaza and Pilar Rodrigo, with María Álvarez, Regina Guati, Lorena Barbadillo, Paula Cabo and Eva Velasco as substitutes, constituted the new national group. At the European Championships in Bucharest, the Spanish group won the bronze medal in the All-Around and with 4 hoops & 4 clubs, taking 6th place with 6 ropes. In September 1993 they competed at the Gymnastic Masters in Stuttgart, where they were 4th in both the All-Around and in the final of 4 hoops & 4 clubs, winning bronze with 6ropes. In the Group Masters of Alicante were silver in the All-Around and gold in the two apparatus finals. In Alicante the group was already made up of Maider, María Álvarez, Lorena Barbadillo, Paula Cobo, Regina Guati, Cristina Martínez, Alicia Martín and Eva Velasco. At the Wacoal Cup in Tokyo they won the bronze medal.

After her retirement she studied at the University of the Basque Country Faculty of physical activity and sports sciences of Vitoria (1996 - 2001). In 2008 she opened her own pilates studio, Mao Studio Pilates, in Pamplona where she currently works as a physical education teacher and instructor. She practices sports such as swimming, skiing and kitesurfing.

After Emilia Boneva's death on 20 September 2019, Maider and other former national gymnasts gathered to pay tribute to her during the Euskalgym held on 16 November 2019. The event took place before 8,500 attendees at the Bilbao Exhibition Centre de Baracaldo and was followed by a dinner in Boneva's honor.
