= Virtus, The British Sixth Form College =

Location
- Alcobendas, C/Salvia, 46; Madrid, 28109; Spain
- Coordinates: 40.5292°N 3.6317°W

Information
- School type: international school
- Founded: 2016
- School district: La Moraleja
- Head teacher: Sandra Radford
- Grades: A-Level (IALs)
- Age: 15 to 18
- Language: English
- Accreditations: UCAS, Edexcel, Cambridge Assessment International Education, UNED
- Website: https://virtuscollege.es/en/

Virtus College, The British Sixth Form is an international school located in Madrid, Spain. The institution focuses on A-Level education for students aged 15 to 18 and prepares them for university entry.

== Overview ==
Founded in 2016 by alumni of Oxford University and Imperial College London, Virtus operates under the charter of The Schools Trust, a non-profit UK-based organisation that supports educational institutions worldwide. The school provides A-Level education and has a curriculum structured for classes comprising 5-9 students. A two-year plan, as well as a mentorship programme, are developed for each student, centred on university admission.

The school has been discussed and noted in the media such as Forbes and ABC, among others.

=== Academics ===
The school offers various clubs and societies based on student interests, such as Chess, Music, Criminology, Investment, Astronomy, Forecasting, Psychology Art/IR, Young Entrepreneurship, Finance, Business Development, Business and Data Analysis, and Python Coding.

=== Mentorship programme ===
The school provides a mentoring programme that offers weekly individual support for students throughout the academic year.

=== Educational approach ===
The school employs a "Gate-to-Gate" model focused on university preparation. This includes developing a roadmap tailored to each student's academic interests and strengths.

=== Extracurricular activities ===
Virtus students participate in a range of extracurricular activities including volunteer programmes, cultural events, field trips, and athletic competitions. The campus houses various facilities such as a library, theatre, laboratories, multipurpose room, sports fields, and tennis and paddle tennis courts.

== See also ==
- Education in Spain
