= Dimitrinka Todorova =

Bulgarian rhythmic gymnast (1974–2020)

- Димитринка Тодорова
- Born: February 3, 1974 Bulgaria
- Died: 12 March 2020 (aged 46)

Gymnastics career
- Discipline: Rhythmic gymnastics
- Country represented: Bulgaria
- Retired: yes
Medal record
Rhythmic Gymnastics
European Championships
Gold medal – first place	1992 Stuttgart	Team
Silver medal – second place	1990 Gothenburg	Team
Bronze medal – third place	1990 Gothenburg	Rope
Bronze medal – third place	1990 Gothenburg	Clubs
Bronze medal – third place	1992 Stuttgart	Ball
Junior European Championships
Gold medal – first place	1989 Tenerife	All-Around
Gold medal – first place	1989 Tenerife	Rope
Gold medal – first place	1989 Tenerife	Ball
Gold medal – first place	1989 Tenerife	Team
Silver medal – second place	1989 Tenerife	Hoop
Silver medal – second place	1989 Tenerife	Clubs

Dimitrinka Todorova (Bulgarian: Димитринка Тодорова; 3 February 1974–12 March 2020) was a Bulgarian individual rhythmic gymnast. She was the 1989 junior European champion and won several medals at the senior European championships in 1990 and 1992.

== Biography ==
Todorova was born 3 February, 1974 and trained in the club Slavia with coach Lyudmila Dimitrova.

She was successful as a junior gymnast, winning four gold medals and two silver medals at the 1989 Junior European Championships in Spain, including the all-around gold. In the apparatus finals, she won two golds with rope and ball and two silvers with the hoop and clubs. She also won the team gold along with her teammates Mila Marinova and Teodora Blagoeva.

Todorova turned senior a year later and finished fourth in the all-around at the 1990 European championship in Göteborg. She won a silver medal in the team event with her teammates Julia Baicheva and Neli Atanassova, and individually, she won bronze medals in the ribbon and rope finals. In the ball final, she placed 8th.

In 1992, she again competed at the 1992 European Championship, where she won the gold team medal alongside Maria Petrova and Diana Popova. She won another bronze medal in the ball final, and she placed 4th with clubs and 6th in the hoop final, but she tied for eighth in the all-around.

In 2000, she was in a car accident in Turkey; the ambulance taking her back to Bulgaria then also crashed. Todorova recovered from the crashes. At that time, she was no longer involved in gymnastics.

Todorova died of cancer at the age of 46 on 12 March, 2020.
