= Scandinavian School in Madrid =

International school in Madrid, Spain

- Colegio Escandinavo de Madrid; Skandinaviska Skolan i Madrid

Location
- Camino Ancho 14 28109 La Moraleja, Madrid, España
- Coordinates: 40.5103488°N 3.613675599999965°W

Information
- Established: 1944
- Website: escandinavo.com

Scandinavian School in Madrid (Spanish: Colegio Escandinavo de Madrid; Swedish: Skandinaviska Skolan i Madrid) is an international school in La Moraleja, Alcobendas, Spain, in the Madrid metropolitan area. It serves students in preschool (förskola/educación infantil) until secondary school (gymnasium/bachillerato).

It was established on two campuses in Madrid in 1944. It moved to Alcobendas in 1973 and adopted its current name in 1982.

As of 2016, 40 percent of the students had origins in the Nordic countries, and the students originated from about 15 countries. There are two sections: The Scandinavian section, which follows the Swedish National Curriculum and is taught in Swedish, and the International Section, which uses the Cambridge curriculum and English as a language of instruction.
