= Cristina Martínez (gymnast) =

Spanish rhythmic gymnast

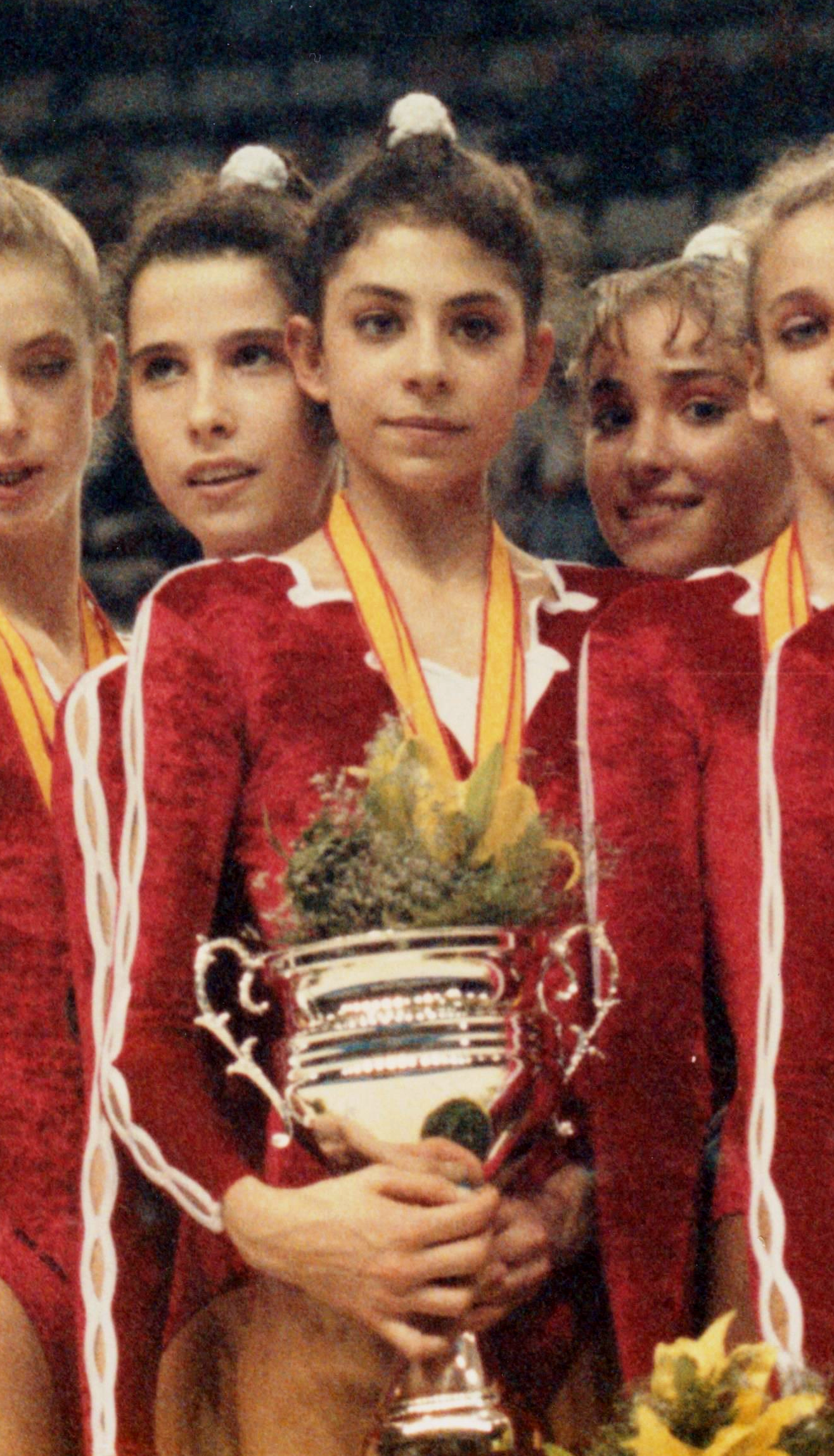

Personal information
- Full name: Cristina Martínez Vaquero

Gymnastics career
- Discipline: Rhythmic gymnastics
- Country represented: Spain (1992-1993)
- Head coach: Ana Roncero
- Assistant coach: María Fernández Ostolaza
- Former coach: Emilia Boneva
- Choreographer: Georgi Neykov
- Retired: yes
Medal record
Rhythmic Gymnastics
Representing Spain
World Championships
Silver medal – second place	1992 Bruxelles	Group All-Around
Bronze medal – third place	1992 Bruxelles	6 Ribbons
European Championships
Gold medal – first place	1992 Stuttgart	Group All-Around
Gold medal – first place	1992 Stuttgart	3 Balls + 3 Ropes
Bronze medal – third place	1992 Stuttgart	6 Ribbons
Bronze medal – third place	1993 Bucharest	All-Around
Bronze medal – third place	1993 Bucharest	4 Hoops + 4 Clubs

Cristina Martínez Vaquero is a retired Spanish rhythmic gymnast. As part of the national senior group, she won European and World Championships medals.

== Biography ==
In 1992, she was invited by Emilia Boneva to join the national rhythmic gymnastics team of Spain as part of the group.

That year, they won silver in a tournament in Karlsruhe, and later they were invited to give an exhibition at one in Corbeil-Essonnes. In June, with new exercises, she was a substitute at the European Championships in Stuttgart, where Spain shared the gold medal in the All-Around with the Russian team, in addition to winning another gold in the 3 balls and 3 ropes final and bronze in 6 ribbons. Cristina did not compete in the 1992 Olympic Games because rhythmic gymnastics was an individual-only sport at the Olympics at that time, although she participated with the rest of her teammates in the opening ceremony, leading the parade of participating nations.

Shortly after, they won gold at both the Asvo Cup in Austria and the Alfred Vogel Cup in the Netherlands, where they also won silver in 6 ribbons and gold in 3 balls and 3 ropes. Teresa Fuster and Isabel Gómez were injured before the World Championships in Brussels, which took place in November 1992. They were kept on the team as substitutes, but in the competing lineup were replaced by Martínez, Alicia Martín and Bárbara Plaza. In this competition, the team won silver in the All-Around, with their score just one tenth of a point away from allowing them to retain the world title they had won the previous year. In addition, on 22 November, they won bronze in the 6 ribbons final and were 8th with 3 balls and 3 ropes.

In 1993, Ana Roncero became national head coach, and María Fernández Ostolaza joined as coach of the group. After many of the previous group members retired Alicia, Carolina Borrell, Alicia Martín, Maider Olleta, Bárbara Plaza and Pilar Rodrigo, with María Álvarez, Regina Guati, Lorena Barbadillo, Paula Cabo and Eva Velasco as substitutes, constituted the new national group. At the European Championships in Bucharest, the Spanish group won the bronze medal in the All-Around and with 4 hoops & 4 clubs, taking 6th place with 6 ropes. In September 1993 they competed at the Gymnastic Masters in Stuttgart, where they were 4th in both the All-Around and in the final of 4 hoops & 4 clubs, winning bronze with 6ropes. In the Group Masters of Alicante won silver in the All-Around and gold in the two apparatus finals. In Alicante, the group was already made up of Cristina, María Álvarez, Lorena Barbadillo, Paula Cobo, Regina Guati, Alicia Martín, Maider Olleta and Eva Velasco. At the Wacoal Cup in Tokyo, they won the bronze medal. She retired at the end of the year.

After Boneva's death on 20 September 2019, Cristina and other former national gymnasts gathered to pay tribute to her during the Euskalgym held on 16 November 2019. The event took place before 8,500 attendees at the Bilbao Exhibition Centre de Baracaldo and was followed by a dinner in Boneva's honour.
