= 1990 Rhythmic Gymnastics European Championships =

- Location: Gothenburg, Sweden
- Start date: 01 November 1990
- End date: 4 November 1990

The 1990 Rhythmic Gymnastics European Championships is the 7th edition of the Rhythmic Gymnastics European Championships, which took place from 1 to 4 November 1990 in Gothenburg, Sweden.

== Medal winners ==
Event	Gold	Silver	Bronze
Team Competition
Team	Soviet Union; Oksana Skaldina; Alexandra Timoshenko; Oksana Kostina	Bulgaria; Julia Baicheva; Dimitrinka Todorova; Neli Atanassova	Spain; Carolina Pascual; Mónica Ferrández; Noelia Fernandez
Individual
All-Around	Julia Baicheva; Bulgaria; Alexandra Timochenko; Soviet Union	none awarded	Oksana Skaldina; Soviet Union
Rope	Oksana Skaldina; Soviet Union	Alexandra Timochenko; Soviet Union	Julia Baicheva; Bulgaria; Dimitrinka Todorova; Bulgaria
Hoop	Oksana Kostina; Soviet Union	Julia Baicheva; Bulgaria; Alexandra Timochenko; Soviet Union	none awarded
Ball	Oksana Skaldina; Soviet Union; Alexandra Timochenko; Soviet Union	none awarded	Julia Baicheva; Bulgaria; Irina Deleanu; Romania
Clubs	Oksana Skaldina; Soviet Union	Julia Baicheva; Bulgaria	Dimitrinka Todorova; Bulgaria
Groups
All-Around	Bulgaria	Soviet Union	Spain; Beatriz Barral; Teresa Fuster; Lorea Elso; Montserrat Martín; Arancha Marty; Vanesa Muñiz
6 Clubs	Bulgaria	Spain; Beatriz Barral; Teresa Fuster; Lorea Elso; Montserrat Martín; Arancha Marty; Vanesa Muñiz	Italy; Soviet Union
3 Ropes + 3 Balls	Bulgaria; Soviet Union	none awarded	Spain; Beatriz Barral; Teresa Fuster; Lorea Elso; Montserrat Martín; Arancha Marty; Vanesa Muñiz

== Medal table ==
Rank	Nation	Gold	Silver	Bronze	Total
1	Soviet Union (URS)	8	3	2	13
2	Bulgaria (BUL)	4	3	4	11
3	Spain (ESP)	0	1	3	4
4	Italy (ITA)	0	0	1	1
4	Romania (ROU)	0	0	1	1
Totals (5 entries)		12	7	11	30
