= Alicia Martín =

Spanish rhythmic gymnast (born 1975)

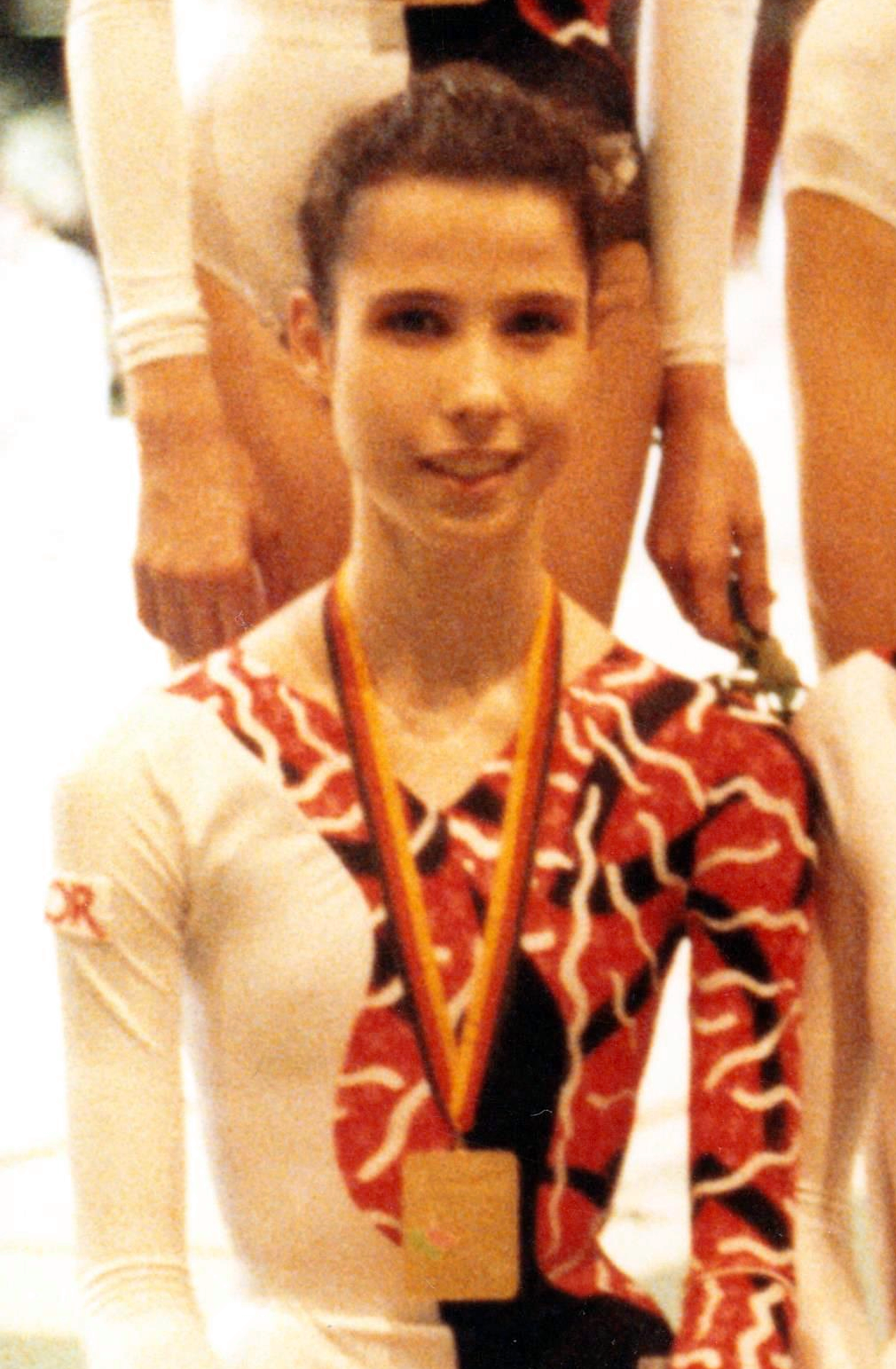

Personal information
- Full name: Alicia Martín Jurado
- Born: 30 October 1975 (age 50) Valladolid, Spain

Gymnastics career
- Discipline: Rhythmic gymnastics
- Country represented: Spain (1991-1993)
- Club: Club Vallisoletano
- Head coach: Ana Roncero
- Assistant coach: María Fernández Ostolaza
- Former coach: Emilia Boneva
- Choreographer: Georgi Neykov
- Retired: yes
Medal record
Rhythmic Gymnastics
Representing Spain
World Championships
Silver medal – second place	1992 Bruxelles	Group All-Around
Bronze medal – third place	1992 Bruxelles	6 Ribbons
European Championships
Gold medal – first place	1992 Stuttgart	Group All-Around
Gold medal – first place	1992 Stuttgart	3 Balls + 3 Ropes
Bronze medal – third place	1992 Stuttgart	6 Ribbons
Bronze medal – third place	1993 Bucharest	All-Around
Bronze medal – third place	1993 Bucharest	4 Hoops + 4 Clubs

Alicia Martín Jurado (born 30 October 1975) is a retired Spanish rhythmic gymnast. She is a two-time European champion (Stuttgart 1992) and world runner-up (Brussels 1992), in addition to winning numerous other international medals.

== Biography ==
She began doing rhythmic gymnastics at the age of 7 at the Vallisoletano Club in Valladolid. She remained there until 1991, having as main coaches Teresa de Isla, Sonia Conde, Marga de Isla and Virginia Manzanera. In 1989 she won a gold medal at the Spanish Group Championships held in Torrelavega, in 1990 the silver medal at the Spanish Individual Championships in Palencia, and 7th place in senior category in the Spanish Championships held in Torrevieja in 1991. At the end of the competition of the Spanish Group Championships in December 1990, her coach told her that she had been selected to go to a selection camp with the national team in Madrid.

In 1991 she became part of the national senior group, training about 8 hours a day at the Moscardó Gymnasium in Madrid under the direction of Emilia Boneva and Ana Roncero, who since 1982 had been national group coach and head coach. In 1993 her coach became María Fernández Ostolaza. Although from the summer of 1991 she was already part of the group, she was not called up to the competitions until the following year.

In 1992 they won silver in a tournament in Karlsruhe, and later they were invited to give an exhibition at one in Corbeil-Essonnes. In June, with new exercises, she was a substitute at the European Championships in Stuttgart, where Spain shared the gold medal in the All-Around with the Russian team, in addition to winning another gold in the 3 balls and 3 ropes final and bronze in 6 ribbons. Alicia did not compete in the 1992 Olympic Games because rhythmic gymnastics was an individual-only sport at the Olympics at that time, although she participated with the rest of her teammates in the opening ceremony, leading the parade of participating nations.

Shortly after, they won gold at both the Asvo Cup in Austria and the Alfred Vogel Cup in the Netherlands, where they also won silver in 6 ribbons and gold in 3 balls and 3 ropes. Fuster and Gómez were injured before the World Championships in Brussels, which took place in November 1992. They were kept on the team as substitutes, but in the competing lineup were replaced by Alicia, Cristina Martínez and Bárbara Plaza. In this competition, the team won silver in the All-Around, with their score just one tenth of a point away from allowing them to retain the world title they had won the previous year. In addition, on November 22 they won bronze in the 6 ribbons final and were 8th with 3 balls and 3 ropes.

In 1993, Ana Roncero became national head coach and María Fernández Ostolaza joined as coach of the group. After many of the previous group members retired Alicia, Carolina Borrell, Cristina Martínez, Maider Olleta, Bárbara Plaza and Pilar Rodrigo, with María Álvarez, Regina Guati, Lorena Barbadillo, Paula Cabo and Eva Velasco as substitutes, constituted the new national group. At the European Championships in Bucharest, the Spanish group won the bronze medal in the All-Around and with 4 hoops & 4 clubs, taking 6th place with 6 ropes. In September 1993 they competed at the Gymnastic Masters in Stuttgart, where they were 4th in both the All-Around and in the final of 4 hoops & 4 clubs, winning bronze with 6ropes. In the Group Masters of Alicante were silver in the All-Around and gold in the two apparatus finals. In Alicante the group was already made up of Alicia, María Álvarez, Lorena Barbadillo, Paula Cobo, Regina Guati, Cristina Martínez, Maider Olleta and Eva Velasco. At the Wacoal Cup in Tokyo they won the bronze medal.

She retired in November 1993, following the Wacoal Cup. She took the course to be a licensed national rhythmic gymnastics' coach, working as a school-level coach. Alicia graduated in speech therapy from the University of Valladolid, and in psychology from the National University of Distance Education. After working several years as a speech therapist she specialized in clinical psychology at the University Hospital of Burgos. Alicia currently works as a clinical psychologist in a public hospital in Castilla y León.

After Boneva's death on 20 September 2019, Alicia and other former national gymnasts gathered to pay tribute to her during the Euskalgym held on 16 November 2019. The event took place before 8,500 attendees at the Bilbao Exhibition Center de Baracaldo and was followed by a dinner in Boneva's honor.
