= 1992 Rhythmic Gymnastics European Championships =

- Location: Stuttgart, Germany
- Start date: 04 June 1992
- End date: 8 June 1992

The 1992 Rhythmic Gymnastics European Championships is the 8th edition of the Rhythmic Gymnastics European Championships, which took place from 4 June to 8 June in Stuttgart, Germany.

== Medal winners ==
| Event | Gold | Silver | Bronze |
|---|---|---|---|
Team Competition
| Team | Bulgaria; Maria Petrova; Dimitrinka Todorova; Diana Popova | Belarus; Larissa Lukyanenko; Elena Shamatulskaya; Tatiana Ogrizko | Spain; Carolina Pascual; Carmen Acedo; Rosabel Espinosa Russia; Oksana Kostina; Julia Rosliakova; Amina Zaripova |
Individual
| All-Around | Maria Petrova; Bulgaria | Alexandra Timochenko; Ukraine | Oksana Kostina; Russia |
| Rope | Oksana Skaldina; Ukraine | Alexandra Timochenko; Ukraine | Maria Petrova; Bulgaria |
| Hoop | Oksana Kostina; Russia; Larissa Lukyanenko; Belarus; Oksana Skaldina; Ukraine; Alexandra Timochenko; Ukraine | none awarded | none awarded |
| Ball | Oksana Kostina; Russia; Alexandra Timochenko; Ukraine | none awarded | Larissa Lukyanenko; Belarus; Dimitrinka Todorova; Bulgaria |
| Clubs | Oksana Kostina; Russia; Oksana Skaldina; Ukraine; Alexandra Timochenko; Ukraine | none awarded | none awarded |
Groups
| All-Around | Russia; Spain; Isabel Gómez Pérez; Débora Alonso; Lorea Elso; Teresa Fuster; Montserrat Martín; Gemma Royo | none awarded | Hungary |
| 6 Ribbons | Russia | Bulgaria | Spain; Isabel Gómez Pérez; Débora Alonso; Lorea Elso; Teresa Fuster; Montserrat Martín; Gemma Royo |
| 3 Balls + 3 Ropes | Spain; Isabel Gómez Pérez; Débora Alonso; Lorea Elso; Teresa Fuster; Montserrat Martín; Gemma Royo | Russia' | Ukraine |

== Medal table ==
| Rank | Nation | Gold | Silver | Bronze | Total |
|---|---|---|---|---|---|
| 1 | Ukraine (UKR) | 6 | 2 | 1 | 9 |
| 2 | Russia (RUS) | 5 | 1 | 2 | 8 |
| 3 | Bulgaria (BUL) | 2 | 1 | 2 | 5 |
| 4 | Spain (ESP) | 2 | 0 | 2 | 4 |
| 5 | Belarus (BLR) | 1 | 1 | 1 | 3 |
| 6 | Hungary (HUN) | 0 | 0 | 1 | 1 |
| Totals (6 entries) | | 16 | 5 | 9 | 30 |
