= Paloma del Río =

Spanish sports journalist (born 1960)

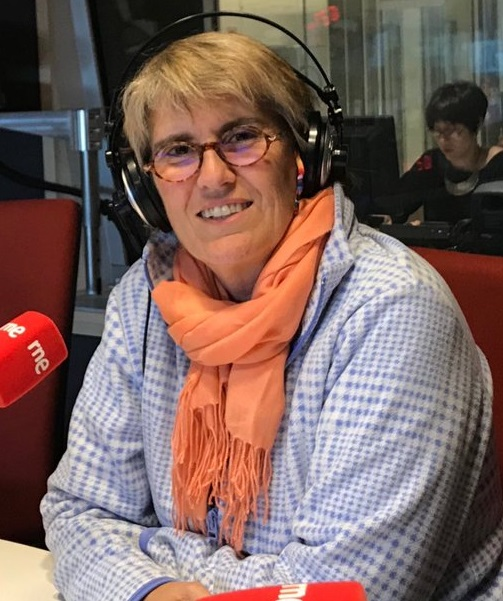
- Born: Paloma del Río Cañadas; 4 April 1960 (age 66); Madrid, Spain
- Education: Complutense University of Madrid
- Occupation: Journalist
- Employer: Televisión Española
- Awards: Royal Order of Sports Merit (2015)

Paloma del Río Cañadas (born 4 April 1960) is a Spanish journalist. She covers rhythmic gymnastics, artistic gymnastics, figure skating, and equestrian competitions for Televisión Española (TVE). She has held various positions in TVE's sports directorate – editor-in-chief (2009), director of sports programs (2009–2013), and currently coordinator of sponsorships and federations.

She has covered several European and World Championships, as well as eight Summer and six Winter Olympic Games. In 2015 she was awarded the Gold Medal of the Royal Order of Sports Merit, and that same year, she published her autobiographical book Enredando en la memoria (Tangled in Memory).

She is considered part of the generation of pioneering women in Spanish sports journalism, along with Mari Carmen Izquierdo, Mercedes Milá, María Antonia Martínez, Elena Sánchez Caballero, Olga Viza, Mari Cruz Esteban, and María Escario.

== Biography ==
Paloma del Río was born in Madrid in 1960. After completing the Baccalaureate, she took a clinical assistant course and began to work on the night shift of the intensive care unit of the Ruber Clinic in Madrid to pay for her studies. In her free time, she continued with Curso de Orientación Universitaria (COU) studies, and majored in journalism at the Complutense University of Madrid without leaving work. She finished her degree with the second best record, so in 1986, she was able to choose a scholarship from the Instituto RTVE to do internships in television, in the sports section of the news. After a few months, she passed some exams that allowed her to maintain her position at TVE.

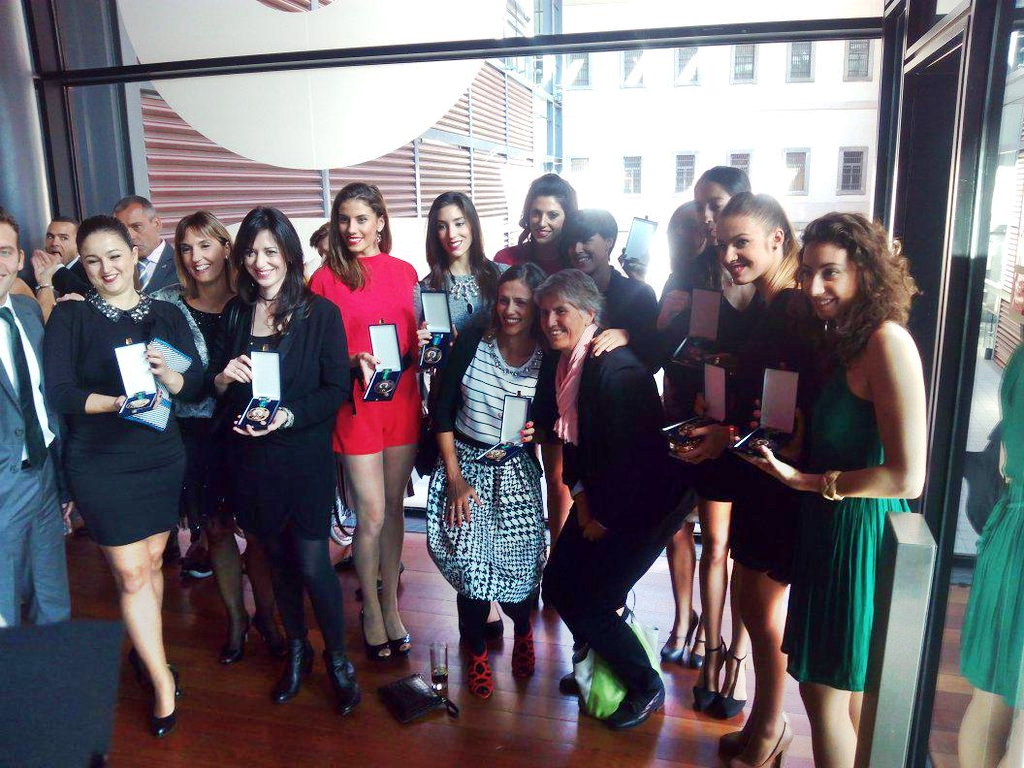
Paloma del Río (center) with Las Niñas de Oro and El Equipaso at the presentation of the Royal Order of Sports Merit (2015)

After a reorganization of the information services, she began to carry out sports broadcasts, the first of which was a table tennis match in Seville. The following month, in June 1987, she covered the Spanish Rhythmic Gymnastics Individual Championships for La 2 from Palma de Mallorca (replacing Maria Escario, who began to present newscasts). After this she was a commentator for similar events, such as the World Championships, the European Championships, the World Cup (2016–2018), and the Euskalgym (2017). Later, she also began to cover artistic gymnastics (replacing Olga Viza, who left to present Estadio 2 in Barcelona). From 1988 to 1989, del Río was deputy director of Domingo Deporte. After a time she also began to broadcast equestrian events, and beginning in 1994, figure skating. Throughout the years, she has commentated alongside former practitioners of these sports, such as José Novillo on broadcasts of artistic gymnastics, and Susana Mendizábal, Maisa Lloret, María Martín, and Almudena Cid on rhythmic gymnastics.

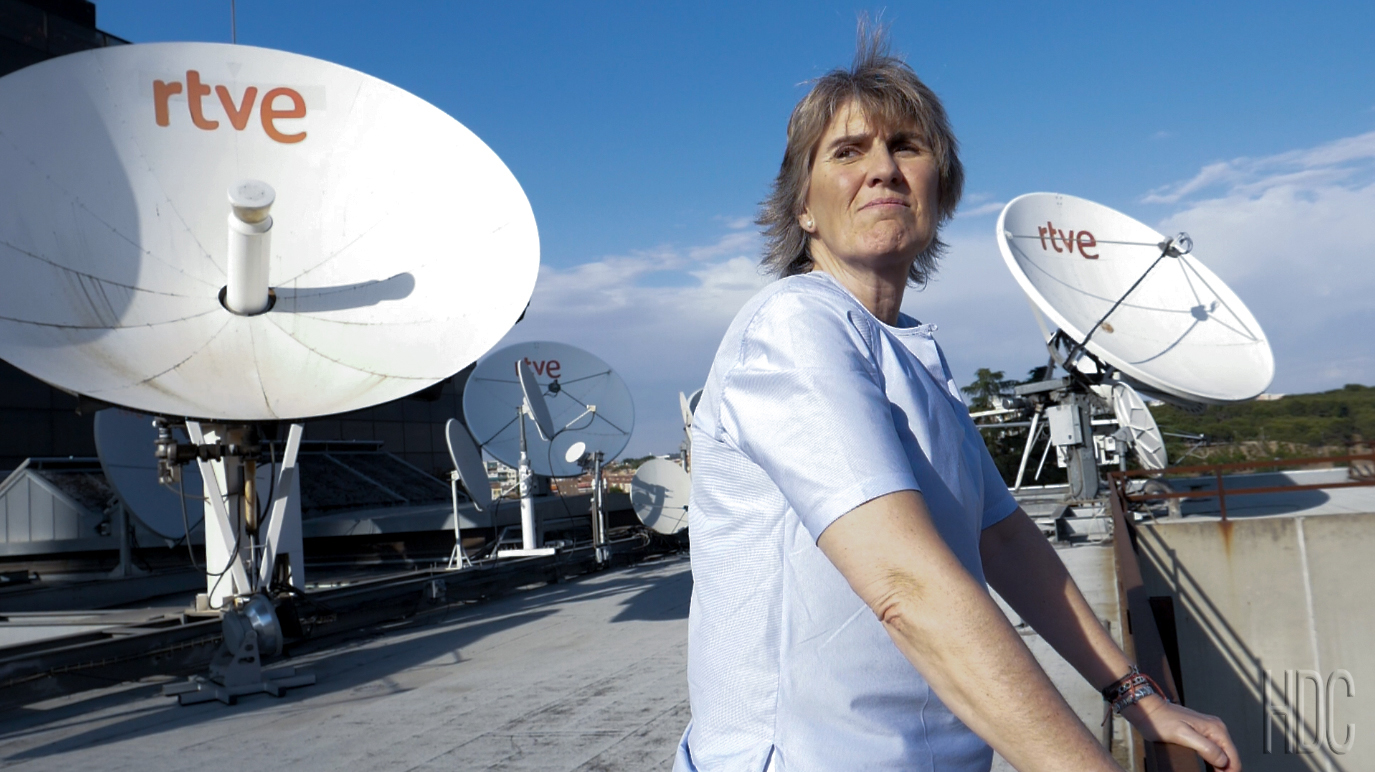
Paloma on the roof of the RTVE studios in Torrespaña during the documentary Hijas de Cynisca (2019)

From 2005 to 2008, she was editor of the program Olímpicos. ADO 2008, and later was the editor of broadcasts of the Beijing Olympics. In September 2011 she and María Escario were awarded the Silver Medal of the Royal Order of Sports Merit by the Consejo Superior de Deportes (CSD).

On 31 August 2015, she was awarded the Gold Medal of the Royal Order of Sports Merit, becoming the first journalist to receive it. On 16 November of that year, she presented her book of sports and personal memories, Enredando en la memoria, at CSD headquarters, where she also received her Gold Medal. In June 2017, she was the ambassador of the Pride Games. Since 17 September 2017, she has contributed a sports segment to the program No es un día cualquiera on Radio Nacional de España. She has been a speaker at many conferences, round tables, and presentations on topics such as Women and Sport, Minority Sports, and Olympism.

In July 2018, her candidacy for the presidency of RTVE was announced, although in December, she did not pass the final cut and was left out of the list of the 20 candidates to preside over the public entity. Subsequently, she and other excluded candidates filed an appeal against this decision, still pending resolution by lawyers of the Congress.

== Personal life ==
Paloma del Río is openly lesbian. In June 2015, she appeared on the list of the 50 most influential homosexuals in Spain, prepared by El Mundo's La Otra Crónica. During WorldPride Madrid 2017 she explained in an interview that "I never thought that I should be ashamed to be a lesbian" and indicated that Martina Navratilova had been a role model for her.

== Selected list of competitions covered ==
World and European Championships (1986–present)
- Rhythmic gymnastics: 30 World and 30 European Championships, several Spanish Individual and Group Championships, the World Cup (2016–2018), and Euskalgym (2017)
- Artistic gymnastics: more than 55 World Championships and 30 Men's and 30 Women's European Championships
- Figure skating: 25 World and 25 European Championships since 1994
- Equestrian: several World and European Championships

Summer Olympic Games (1988–present)
- 1988: Seoul
- 1992: Barcelona
- 1996: Atlanta
- 2000: Sydney
- 2004: Athens
- 2008: Beijing. Also chief editor of the TVE operation and in charge of HD coverage.
- 2012: London. Also editor and in charge of La 1, Teledeporte, and HD coverage.
- 2016: Rio
- 2021: Tokyo

Winter Olympic Games (1994–present)
- 1994: Lillehammer
- 1998: Nagano
- 2002: Salt Lake City
- 2006: Turin
- 2010: Vancouver. Also editor and in charge of the TVE team.
- 2014: Sochi. Also content coordinator of the TVE operation.

Mediterranean Games (1987–present)
- 1987: Latakia
- 2001: Tunis
- 2005: Almería
- 2018: Tarragona

== Awards and recognitions ==
- 2nd Prize of the Arturo Barea Young Adult Novel Award for Nunca tendrás los ojos de la serpiente, granted by the Community of Madrid (1982)
- Ondas Award, shared with the rest of the TVE operation for coverage of the Seoul Summer Olympics (1988)
- Silver Medal of the Royal Order of Sports Merit, awarded by the Consejo Superior de Deportes (2011)
- Talent Award from the Television Academy (2011)
- Recognition of the International Association of Sports Journalists (AIPS) along with other journalists who have covered more than 10 Olympic Games (2012)
- Madrid Women's Career Award (2014)
- Press, Radio, and Television Award, granted by the city council of Cornellà de Llobregat (2014)
- Gold Medal of the Royal Order of Sports Merit, awarded by the Consejo Superior de Deportes (2015)
- Best Communicator in Sport at the Women, Sports, and Business Awards, presented at the 1st Iberian Congress on Women, Sports, and Business (2015)
- Juan Manuel Gozalo Award, from the Spanish Olympic Committee (2015)
- Recognition of the AIPS, along with other journalists who have covered more than 10 Olympic Games (2016)
- Special award at the 19th Sports Gala of Onda Cero Almeria (2016)
- Special award at the 23rd Sports Gala of the Segovia Sports Press Association (2017)
- BaezaDiversa Award in the Sports category, awarded by the city council of Baeza (2018)

== Publications ==
- Nunca tendrás los ojos de la serpiente (1982)
- Enredando en la memoria (2015), Editorial Libros.com, ISBN 978-8416616084
- El papel de las mujeres en el deporte (2019), Editorial Santillana

She has also written the prologue of El origen del deporte femenino en España (2015) by Jorge García García, and the epilogue of Nosotras. Historias del olvidado deporte femenino (2018) by Rubén Guerrero.

== Filmography ==
Year	Title	Character	Notes	Director
2016	La satisfacción es para siempre	Herself (voice)	Short promotional documentary from Freixenet	Jorge Palomar
2018	Más que plata	Herself (voice)	Short documentary	Carlos Agulló
2019	Hijas de Cynisca	Herself	Documentary	Beatriz Carretero
