= Emilia Boneva =

Bulgarian coach in rhythmic gymnastics

- Емилия Бонева
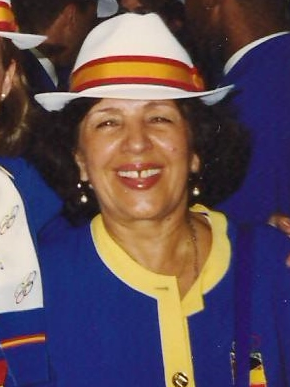
- Born: 21 July 1938; Sofia, Bulgaria
- Died: 20 September 2019 (aged 81)
- Education: National Sports Academy "Vassil Levski"
- Years active: 1968-1996
- Known for: Head coach of the Spanish rhythmic gymnastics team
- Predecessor: Ivanka Chakarova
- Successor: María Fernández Ostolaza
- Relatives: Emilia Luboslavova Boneva (granddaughter)

Emilia Boneva (21 July 1938 - 20 September 2019) was a Bulgarian coach in rhythmic gymnastics and head coach of the Spanish national team from 1982 to 1996. Her achievements included the Olympic gold won by the Niñas de Oro in Atlanta 1996, Carolina Pascual's silver medal in Barcelona 1992. Among other awards, she received the silver medal of Royal Order of Sports Merit (1994).

== Biography ==
In her childhood in Bulgaria Emilia practised artistic gymnastics and later rhythmic gymnastics. She studied at the National Sports Academy, specializing in rhythmic gymnastics. She trained in this discipline in her home country from 1965 to 1982. She moved to Spain on 16 April 1982 to become the head coach of the Spanish team.

From April 1982 to 1992 she coached both individuals and the group, then she worked only with individuals for the 1993 World Championship, and then again with both from March 1994 to December 1996, when she was replaced by María Fernández. Emilia underwent heart surgery in November 1996, then she went back to Bulgaria to live in Sofia.

On 5 August 2000, some of the gymnastics members of the national team in the 1980s and 1990s participated in a homage for Boneva during the Spanish Rhythmic Gymnastics Championship celebrated in Málaga, which was the Niñas de Oro performed an exercise created especially for the occasion that was inspired in the 5 hoops of 1996 and that they trained the previous weeks with the help of Ana Bautista. Emilia traveled from Bulgaria to attend the event, being aware of the fact that many of her old pupils were to perform. The person responsible for organizing the reunion was Carlos Pérez, after the Niñas de Oro continued to work on the idea. The next day they will return in Manzanares el Real, this being the last time they meet again with Emilia.

In 2006, Boneva participated in the documentary "Las Niñas de Oro" through a telephone call from Bulgaria in which she could talk again with the Olympic champions of Atlanta and which was recorded and included in the final montage of the same. In October 2008 she traveled to Madrid to accompany my compatriot Efrossina Angelova on her presentation as the new national head coach. In July 2015, Almudena Cid met again with Emilia in Bulgaria, when the gymnast shared on the web. On 23 July 2016, she participated, with a message recorded in her home in Bulgaria, in the Gala 20th Anniversary of the gold medal in Atlanta '96, which took place in the Palacio de Congresos de Badajoz and which he reunited with Niñas de Oro.

In September 2018 several ex-gymnasts of the Spanish national team travelled to the World Championships in Sofia to meet again with Emilia, also organizing a home dinner in her honour. The gymnasts who attended the homecoming were Natalia Marín, Vanesa Muñiz, Lorea Elso, Bito Fuster, Montse Martín, Gemma Royo, Nuria Cabanillas, Estíbaliz Martínez, Maider Esparza, Ana Bautista, Carmen Acedo, Carolina Pascual, Rosabel Espinosa and Mónica Ferrández. After her death, which took place on 20 September 2019, 70 former national gymnasts gathered to pay tribute to her during the Euskalgym held on 16 November 2019, the event took place before 8,500 attendees at the Bilbao Exhibition Center de Baracaldo and was followed by a dinner in her honor. From 20 to 22 May 2022, the 1st International Slavia Cup Tournament was held in Sofia, created in honor of Emilia Boneva by Club Slavia, the team that she coached from 1968 to 1982.

== Legacy and influence ==
The groups that Emilia trained, her achievements and her setups, have influenced subsequent generations of gymnasts and coaches. The bronze medal at the European Championships in Vienna in 1984 was the first for the Spanish group since 1975, and began a long period of winning international medals. In an interview in 2016, the captain of that team, María Fernández Ostolaza, highlighted the importance of that European medal for Spanish rhythmic gymnastics:

At that time, what we wanted was to overthrow the Eastern countries [...] As the medals were always Russia, Bulgaria and Czechoslovakia, ours was a great milestone and the bronze in the European Championship was indeed a feat for the team . It was the beginning of something.

The gold medal of the group known as the Primeras Chicas de Oro at the Athens World Championships in 1991, the Olympic silver of Carolina Pascual in 1992, the world gold of Carmen Acedo in 1993 and the Olympic title of the Niñas de Oro in 1996, also represented new milestones. The former captain of the Spanish team Ana María Pelaz declared in an interview in 2009 after her retirement that "when I saw the group in Atlanta '96 I said to myself: I want to be like them.". The gymnast Carolina Rodríguez, once asked about the origins of her passion for rhythmic, stated that "in 1996, after seeing Spain win gold in Atlanta, when I was 10 years old, I knew that one day I would want to be there, that I wanted to be at the Olympics." Alejandra Quereda, captain of the Spanish team known as Equipaso and current head coach of the national team, asked in 2014 what for her had been the most incredible thing that has happened in gymnastics, answered that "Spain's gold in Atlanta. It marked the history of our gymnastics. From there everything changed."

After the premiere of the documentary Las Niñas de Oro in 2013, its director, Carlos Beltrán, stated this in an interview regarding the reception of the film:

The pull that this story has and that of people who love it is impressive. These women and Emilia Boneva wrote one of the most beautiful sports stories in our country. With all the components of the elite and the epic and with all those of childhood friendship. The disdain with which our system relegates these girls to oblivion is something that will have to be reviewed soon, because there is no right.

The 1996 5 hoops' routine has been honoured by other gymnasts, such as in the exhibition exercise of the Spanish junior group at Euskalgym 2012 (made up of Paula Gómez, Sara González, Miriam Guerra, Claudia Heredia, Carmen Martínez, Victoria Plaza and Pilar Villanueva), where, as in the 1996 exercise, "America" by Leonard Bernstein was used, in addition to two other songs from the West Side Story soundtrack: "Dance at the Gym" and "Overture".The 2016 Spanish junior group, Mónica Alonso, Victoria Cuadrillero, Clara Esquerdo, Ana Gayán, Alba Polo, Lía Rovira and Sara Salarrullana also honored this exercise at the 20th Anniversary Gold Medal Gala in Atlanta '96, using the same music and emulating some movements from the original routine. At the Euskalgym 2018, the gymnasts Saioa Agirre, Teresa Gorospe, Izaro Martín and Salma Solaun also performed part of the exercise during the tribute to the Basque Olympic rhythmic gymnasts.

=== In popular culture ===
Among other appearances in popular culture, Emilia has served as the basis for the character of Maya, who appears in the series of children's stories Olympia (2014), written by Almudena Cid and illustrated by Montse Martín. Likewise, the story of the life of Emilia and the Golden Girls in the national rally is present in the fictionalized autobiography Lágrimas por una medalla (2008), written by Tania Lamarca and Cristina Gallo. Reviews of the milestones of Boneva's career, such as Spain's world title in 1991 or the 1996 Olympic medal, appear in books such as Sports Rhythmic Gymnastics: Aspects and Evolution (1995) by Aurora Fernández del Valle, Golden Spaniards (1999) by Fernando Olmeda and Juan Manuel Gozalo, Entangling in Memory (2015) by Paloma del Rio, or Rhythmic Brushstrokes (2017) by Montse and Manel Martin.

== Personal life ==
A granddaughter of hers, Emilia Luboslavova Boneva, was a member of the Spanish junior artistic swimming team.
