= 1990 FIG Rhythmic Gymnastics World Cup =

International rhythmic gymnastics competition

The 1990 FIG Rhythmic Gymnastics World Cup was the third edition of the Rhythmic Gymnastics World Cup, held in Brussels, Belgium. The competition was officially organized by the International Gymnastics Federation.

== Medalists ==
| Event | Gold | Silver | Bronze | Ref. |
| Individual all-around | (Soviet Union) Oksana Skaldina | (Bulgaria) Mila Marinova | (Bulgaria) Julia Baitscheva | |
| Rope | (Soviet Union) Oksana Skaldina | (Soviet Union) Aleksandra Timoshenko | (Bulgaria) Julia Baitscheva | |
| Hoop | (Soviet Union) Oksana Skaldina | (Soviet Union) Aleksandra Timoshenko (Bulgaria) Mila Marinova (Bulgaria) Julia Baitscheva | —N/a | |
| Ball | (Bulgaria) Julia Baitscheva (Soviet Union) Oksana Skaldina | —N/a | (Bulgaria) Mila Marinova | |
| Ribbon | (Bulgaria) Mila Marinova | (Soviet Union) Oksana Skaldina | (Canada) Mary Fuzesi (Romania) Irina Deleanu | |
| Group all-around | Soviet Union | Bulgaria | Spain | |
| Group 3 ropes + 3 balls | Soviet Union Bulgaria | —N/a | Spain | |
| Group 12 clubs | Soviet Union | Bulgaria | Spain | |

== Medal table ==
| Rank | Nation | Gold | Silver | Bronze | Total |
|---|---|---|---|---|---|
| 1 | Soviet Union (URS) | 7 | 3 | 0 | 10 |
| 2 | Bulgaria (BUL) | 3 | 5 | 3 | 11 |
| 3 | Spain (ESP) | 0 | 0 | 3 | 3 |
| 4 | Canada (CAN) | 0 | 0 | 1 | 1 |
| 4 | Romania (ROU) | 0 | 0 | 1 | 1 |
| Totals (5 entries) | | 10 | 8 | 8 | 26 |

== See also ==
- World Rhythmic Gymnastics Championships
- FIG World Cup
- List of medalists at the FIG World Cup Final
