= Jalousie (Gade) =

1925 instrumental work composed by Jacob Gade

Jalousie is a tango written by Danish composer Jacob Gade in 1925. Its full title is Jalousie "Tango Tzigane" (Jealousy "Gypsy Tango"). It soon became popular around the world and is today a classic in the modern songbook.

== Music and composition ==
The work consists of two themes – the first "a temperamental theme in D minor", followed by a "lyrical section in D major", both with a typical tango rhythm. Although it became Gade's most popular and successful work, he wrote successor tangos, such as the Romanesca, Tango in 1933.

The composer claimed that the mood of the piece had been inspired by his reading a sensational news report of a crime of passion, and "jealousy" became fixed in his mind.

Gade was principal conductor of the 24-piece orchestra of the Palads Cinema in Copenhagen at the time he composed the piece. He wrote it at Tibirke Mølle, north Zealand, where he had a holiday home, as part of the musical accompaniment for the Danish premiere of the silent film Don Q, Son of Zorro. It was performed under Gade's baton on the opening night, 14 September 1925.

== Publication and early recordings ==
The music was published in 1925 by Gade and Warny in Denmark, then the following year in New York and Paris. Radio broadcasts and its use in 1930s films spread its popularity.

One of the first known recordings released was in Germany by the Ohio-Jazz-Orchestra, recorded in January 1926 and released in March that year on the Vox label. Hungarian bandleader Barnabás von Géczy with His Orchestra also released a version in Germany in 1926. In the US, one of the first recordings was by the Hotel Commodore Ensemble on 21 July 1927, released on Edison Records in October 1927. Leo Reisman and His Orchestra released a version in March 1932. No Billboard charts were published during this time, but according to Joel Whitburn's retrospective charts, Reisman's version peaked at number 7. Another well-known recording was made in July 1935 by the Boston Pops Orchestra, conducted by Arthur Fiedler. Released as a single in 1938 on the Victor label, that version peaked at number 13 in the US and went on to sell over a million copies.The record was released in Australia on His Masters' Voice label, credited as The Boston Promenade Orchestra, conducted by Arthur Fiedler. Harry James recorded a version in November 1946 which was released in January 1947 on Columbia and peaked at number 17 in the US.

In 1931, Vera Bloom (daughter of writer-politician Sol Bloom) provided English lyrics. Alternative English lyrics were also composed by Winifred May.

The royalties from the performances of the work allowed Gade to found a charity to help young Danish musicians, called Jacob Gade's Legat.

== Frankie Laine version ==
"Jealousy (Jalousie)"

Single by Frankie Laine with Paul Weston and His Orchestra
- B-side: "Flamenco"
- Released: October 26, 1951
- Recorded: September 10, 1951
- Studio: Radio Recorders, Los Angeles, California
- Genre: Pop
- Length: 3:13
- Label: Columbia
- Songwriters: Jacob Gade; Vera Bloom
- Producer: Mitch Miller

Frankie Laine singles chronology
"Hey, Good Lookin'" (1951)	"Jealousy (Jalousie)" (1951)	"One for My Baby (and One More for the Road)" (1951)

In October 1951, American singer Frankie Laine released his version of the song using the lyrics by Bloom. It peaked at number three in the US, achieving his seventh gold record. It is said to have also sold over a million copies.

After finishing his contract with Mercury Records in March 1951, Laine followed his producer and A&R man Mitch Miller to Columbia Records. The first release was "Jezebel" backed with "Rose, Rose, I Love You" in May 1951, which became a million-copy seller with both songs charting in the top-ten of the Billboard Best Sellers. Laine's subsequent releases also performed well. He recorded "Jealousy (Jalousie)" in September 1951 at Radio Recorders with Paul Weston and His Orchestra, and Carl Fischer on piano who had reworked the song with Laine.

When reviewing the song, Billboard wrote that "Laine turns in one of his most persuasive wax jobs on a captivating treatment of the evergreen tango". Cash Box described it as "a beautiful standard which this version should really send into the pop class. It’s an extremely exciting melody and Frankie’s rendition of the lyrics with Paul Weston on the backing makes it glow".

=== Charts ===
Chart (1951–52)	Peak position
Australia (Kent Music Report)	9
US Billboard Best Selling Pop Singles	3
US Billboard Most Played by Disk Jockeys	3
US Cash Box Top Ten Juke Box Tunes	3

== Billy Fury version ==
"Jealousy"

Single by Billy Fury
- B-side: "Open Your Arms"
- Released: 1 September 1961
- Recorded: 19 July 1961
- Studio: Decca Studios, London
- Genre: Pop
- Length: 2:49
- Label: Decca
- Songwriters: Jacob Gade; Winifred May
- Producers: Dick Rowe; Mike Smith

Billy Fury singles chronology
"Halfway to Paradise" (1961)	"Jealousy" (1961)	"I'd Never Find Another You" (1961)

English singer Billy Fury released his version of the song as a single in September 1961. Following on the success of "Halfway to Paradise", it became his highest charting song, peaking at number two on the Record Retailer chart.

=== Charts ===
Chart (1961)	Peak position
Australia (Kent Music Report)	86
Ireland (Evening Herald)	1
New Zealand (Lever Hit Parade)	7
UK Disc Top 20	4
UK Melody Maker Top 20	4
UK New Musical Express Top 30	4
UK Record Mirror Top 20	4
UK Record Retailer Top 50	2

== Other versions ==
- Organist George Wright recorded a version in 1955 on the former Paradise Theatre Wurlitzer pipe organ that became a classic and was often used to demonstrated high-fidelity equipment.
- In 1961, Esquivel recorded a popular "space age" version that later gained even more currency as the soundtrack of a classic Ernie Kovacs sketch in which office supplies come to life.
- In 1973, Yehudi Menuhin and Stéphane Grappelli (violins) recorded a version (as 'Jealousy' EMI 2093A), accompanied by the Alan Clare trio directed by Max Harris.
- In addition to Bloom's and May's, lyrics in many languages have been fitted to the composition.
- A parody of the lyrics replacing "Jalousie" with "Leprosy" has been a school and summer camp favorite for generations.

== In film and television ==
With and without vocals the piece by its various names has been used in numerous films and in television, including:

- Don Q, Son of Zorro (1925), starring Douglas Fairbanks
- Anchors Aweigh (1945), a classic Gene Kelly, Frank Sinatra musical
- Conflict (1945), a Humphrey Bogart mystery
- Painting the Clouds with Sunshine (1951)
- Silent Movie (1976), a Mel Brooks satire
- Death on the Nile (1978), an Agatha Christie mystery
- Brusten Himmel (Swedish film) (1982)
- Schindler's List (1993), in the second scene in the cabaret
- The Man Who Cried (2000), with Johnny Depp playing a 1920s gypsy
- Fargo (TV series) (2020), in Season 4, Episode 2 The Land of Taking and Killing.
