= La Moraleja =

Affluent residential district of Alcobendas municipality in Spain

Coordinates: 40°30′54″N 3°38′31″W

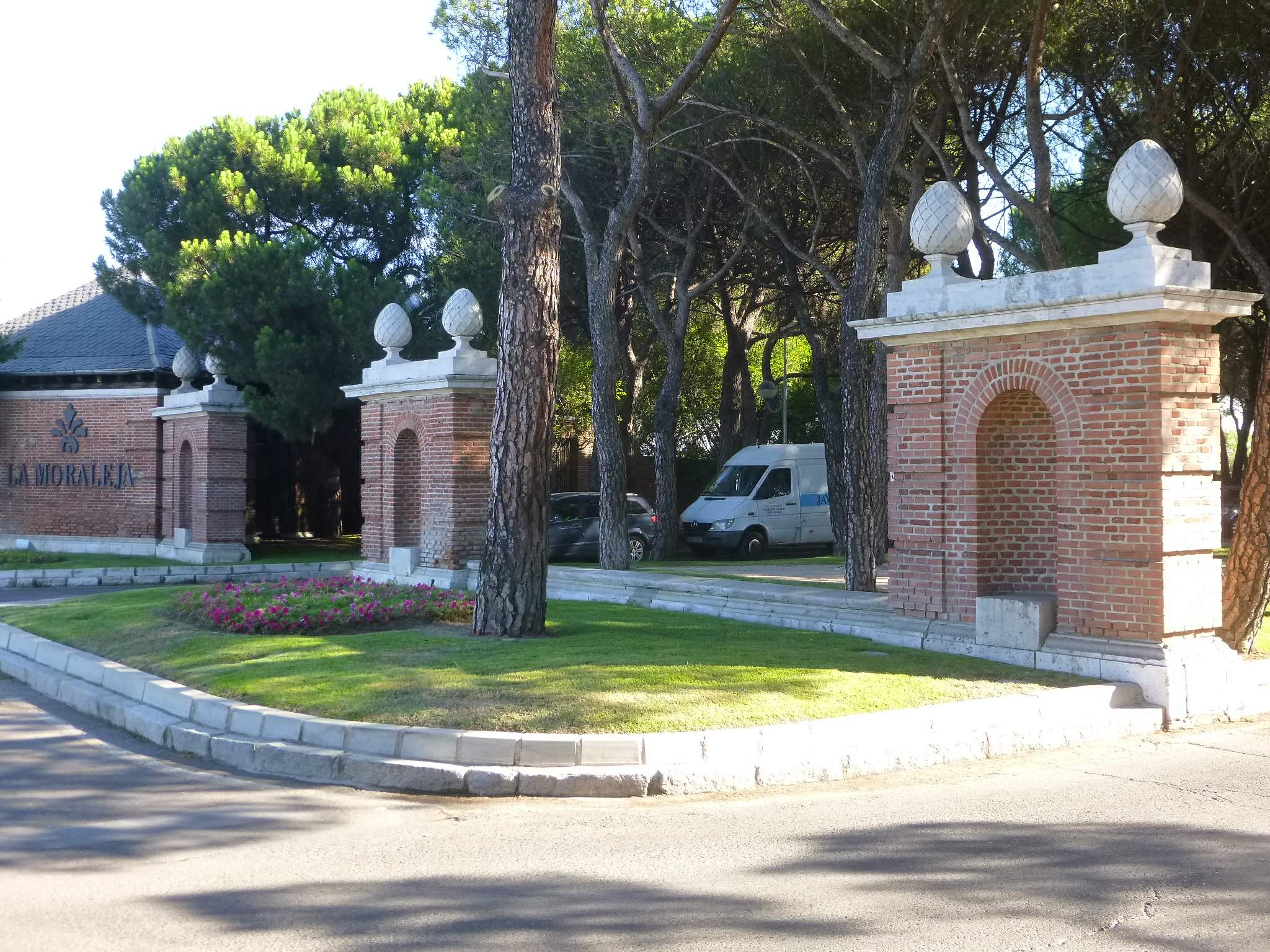
La Moraleja Urbanization (Alcobendas, Madrid)

La Moraleja [la mo.ɾaˈle.xa] is an affluent residential district of Alcobendas municipality in northern Community of Madrid, Spain, in the Madrid metropolitan area; located next to El Soto and El Encinar de los Reyes. The Spanish version of Greenwich, it is home to some of Spain's wealthiest people with sprawling mansions and several luxury golf courses such as La Moraleja Golf Club Madrid.

One author describes it as a "moneyed enclave of the rich and famous, including politicians, actors, top businessmen" with property prices which "range from the merely extortionate to the outright laughable." People such as Rocío Jurado, Isabel Pantoja, José Antonio Camacho, Lola Flores, Ava Gardner, David Beckham, Bing Crosby, Karim Benzema, Ronaldo, Ana Obregón, Belinda Peregrín Schüll, and Gonzalo Higuaín live or have lived in La Moraleja. Aside from its golf courses, La Moraleja also contains some of Spain's elite private schools and sports clubs.

== Education ==
=== Private schools ===
La Moraleja has several private schools.

Runnymede College is a co-educational private school located in La Moraleja, Madrid, Spain. It is the oldest British private school in Spain and a member of the Headmasters' and Headmistresses' Conference, the main representative body for independent secondary schools in the United Kingdom

The Saint-Exupéry campus of the Lycée Français de Madrid or Liceo Francés de Madrid is situated in La Moraleja.

Scandinavian School in Madrid has English and Swedish sections.

Other La Moraleja private schools include Kings College offering British Curriculum and International College Spain, which also offer the full IB Curriculum in English.
