= Ballet Nacional de España =

Spanish dance company

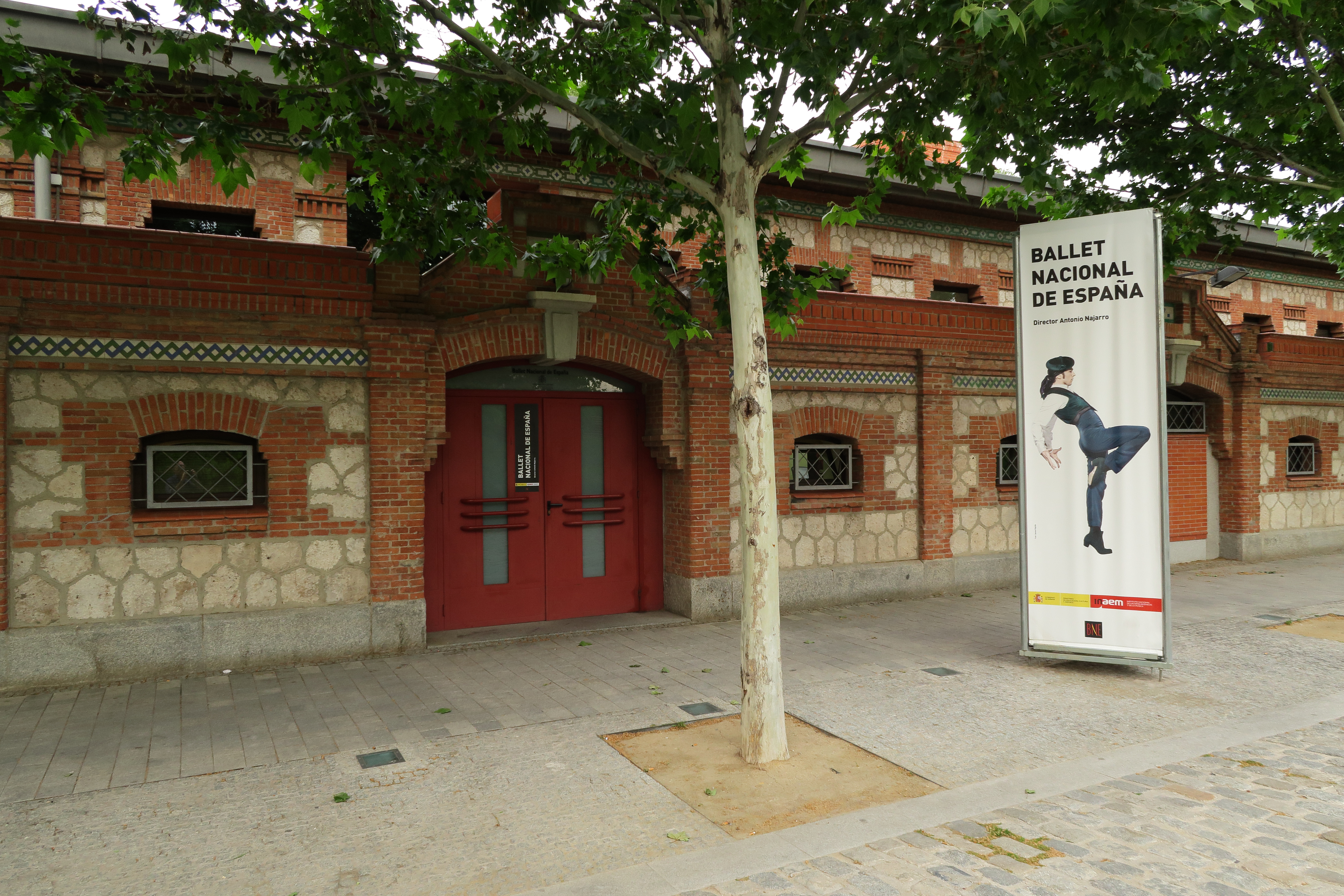
Ballet Nacional de España

Ballet Nacional de España (English: National Ballet of Spain; BNE) is a dance company founded in 1978. It is part of the National Institute of Performing Arts and Music (Spanish: Instituto Nacional de las Artes Escénicas y de la Música; INAEM), and has a number of national and international tours. Its goal is to preserve the Spanish choreographic heritage and its traditions, represented by its different forms: academic, stylized, folk dance, bolero, and flamenco.

== Directors ==
1. Antonio Esteve Ródenas, "Antonio Gades" (1978–1980)
2. Antonio Ruiz Soler, "Antonio el Bailarín" (1980–1983)
3. María Dolores Gómez de Ávila, "María de Ávila" (1983–1986)
4. José Antonio Ruiz de la Cruz, "José Antonio" (1986–1992)
5. Aurora Pons, Nana Lorca, and Victoria Eugenia (1993–1997)
6. Aída Gómez (1998–2001)
7. Elvira Andrés (2001–2004)
8. José Antonio Ruiz de la Cruz, "José Antonio" (2004–2011)
9. Antonio Najarro (2011–2019)
10. Rubén Olmo (2019–)

== See also ==
- Spanish National Dance Company
- Teatro de la Zarzuela
