= Jacob Gade =

Danish musician (1879–1963)

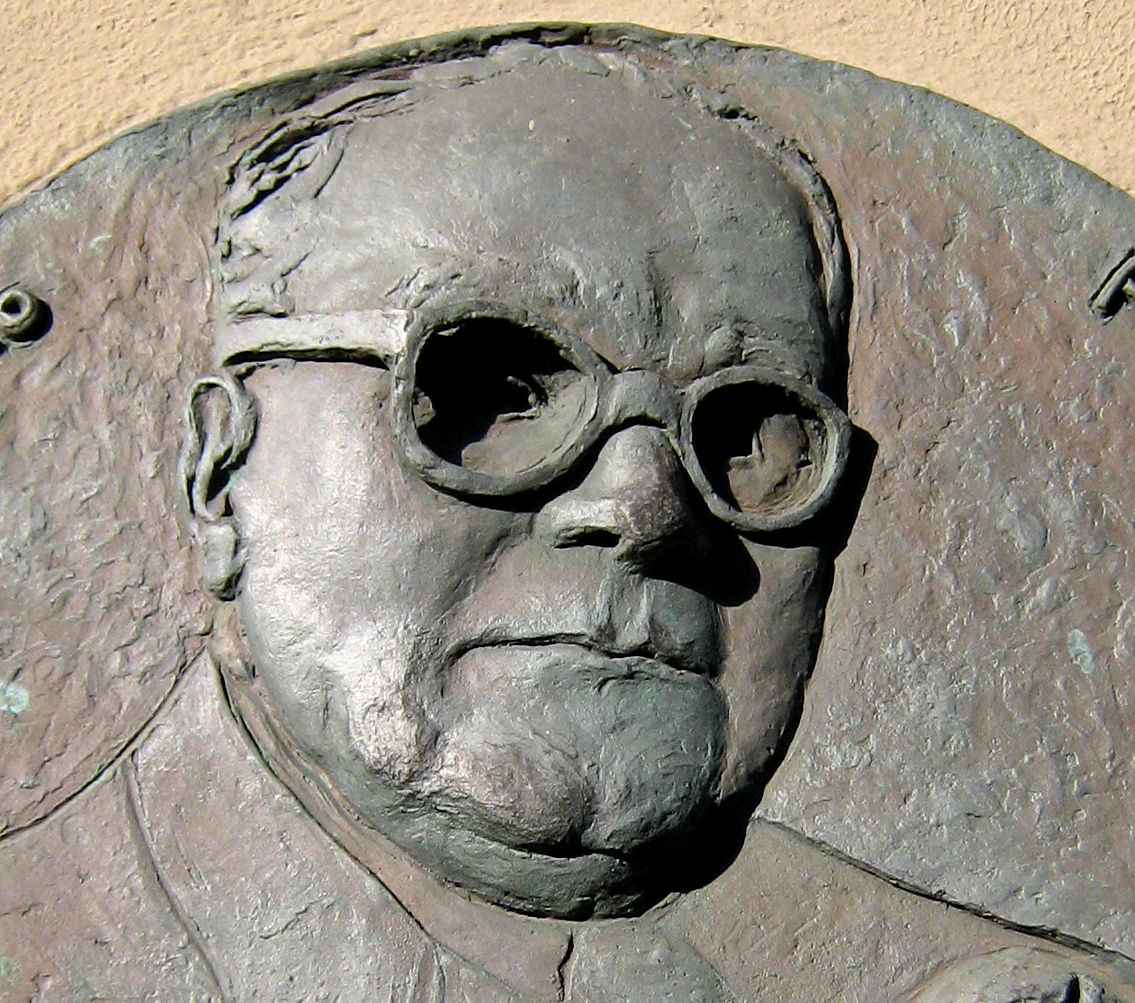
- Commemorative Plaque in Vejle
- Born: Jacob Thune Hansen Gade; 29 November 1879; Vejle, Denmark
- Died: 20 February 1963 (aged 83)
- Occupations: Composer; Violinist; Conductor

Jacob Thune Hansen Gade (29 November 1879 – 20 February 1963) was a Danish violinist and composer, mostly of orchestral popular music. He is remembered today for a single tune, Jalousie (also known as Jalousie "Tango Tzigane" and Tango Jalousie).

== Early life ==
Jacob Thune Hansen Gade was born in Vejle, Denmark on 29 November 1879 and died on 20 February 1963. He belonged to a family of musicians. His grandfather and his father used to go around the nearby villages to play at all kinds of parties. From an early age, he also began to play and was another member of the musical group.

He was nine when he made his debut as trumpeter. A year later he was invited to Copenhagen to become a soloist in the orchestra of the Tivoli Garden, an amusement park. It was only at age 12 when he began to study violin, first with his father and later with other teachers. Soon he evidenced his ambition, he wanted to be recognized and for that he decided to move to the capital.

Note that there's no family connection with the composer Niels W. Gade.

== Music composer ==
He began to compose country music, polkas and similar rhythms. He dreamed of being an orchestra conductor, and of writing waltzes, by then he was convinced that it was the best music in the world. He had a hard time, at night, he used to sleep at the entrance of buildings, at the hall near the stairs.

He started to work at small cafeterias and, about two years later, when he was only 18, he began to connect with people who summoned him to play at an operetta in Frederiksberg, the night center of entertainment at that time.

A prolific composer, in 1900, for the first time a toast song of his was published titled “Der er sollys i modne druer” (There is sunshine in ripe grapes), with lyrics by his finder, Lorry Feilberg. It turned out a very popular song and, among others, it was sung by Elna From, a theater actress ten years older than he, who was his first love. Although they never married, he had three children with her. They separated in 1906 and two years later, in Christiania (today called Oslo), he married another actress: Mimi Mikkelsen, with whom he lived until she died in 1951.

== Orchestras ==
He joined several orchestras up to 1903 when he already led his own. He didn't change his orientation; he was creator and diffuser of danceable music. In 1909, he was hired by the famous Hotel Bristol, located in front of the main plaza of Copenhagen. In order to enhance his musical knowledge he turned to maestro Max Schlüler, a concert player. Gade was already 30 and was too old to become a concert instrumentalist of classical music. Some time before, for the same reason he had not been accepted in the Royal Danish Conservatory of Music.

In 1914 he began to lead orchestras that played at theaters and as well at the most important cinema theaters as accompaniment to silent films. At the same time he performed a series of concerts as soloist, including a Paganini composition. As composer he was in a period when he wrote waltzes with a title in French. He adopted several pseudonyms, like Maurice Ribot, Leon Bonnard, James Wellington, Fred Marshall and Jascha Tjenko. He used to say that they made him widely known and provided him with an international touch. The principal paper of the city mentioned him as the king of waltz. His juvenile dream was coming true.

In 1919 he traveled to New York, joined orchestras that played at cinema theaters, and put together aggregations that included up to 80 members, and soon he had another satisfaction, he was chosen in a contest to join the Philharmonic Orchestra of New York. For two years he only devoted to playing classical music.

He returned to his country to conduct the orchestra of the Palads Cinema theater and to compose and arrange music to be played during the projection of movies. By that time he composed “Jalousie”. They say that its title had inspired the melody. He was on leave in Christiania, near a windmill far from the city, when he read on a paper that a man had murdered his wife because of jealousy.

His golden period lasted until 1929 when sound films arrived. But it scarcely affected him. In 1931 he opened the National Scala theater, and there he continued to play entertainment music for dancing. His career as orchestra leader and player before public audiences ended by his own decision.

== Worldwide hit ==
Gade's Jalousie was a worldwide hit. Performed for the first time on Monday 14 September 1925 at the premiere of the American movie Don Q. Son of Zorro, starring Douglas Fairbanks and Mary Astor, it placed Denmark in the world map of music. His royalties as composer were so ample that in the 1970s it was estimated that the song was played, at least, once every minute on some radio of the planet.

After Jalousie he devoted solely to musical composition, retired and based in a country house. There, among others, were born Rhapsodietta and another tango Romanesca which were published in Copenhagen and in Paris. He returned to the United States of America in 1939 where they offered to publish his whole output.

On 8 April 1940 he returned to his country. The following day the Nazis invaded Denmark. He endured it by settling on the Fiskerleje Island where he continued composing. There a successful waltz was born: Capricious. Also other tangos: El matador, Tango charmeuse, Lille Mary Anne, Laila, and Tango Glamour.

Jalousie was born as an instrumental, but later in every country a lyric was written, according to their taste and commercial preference. This is the case of the above-mentioned Vera Bloom for the previously cited Frankie Laine. In Finland a lyric written by Kullervo (alias) is known. In Great Britain, the orchestra led by Gerald Bright presented his vocalist Monterrey (whose true name was Montgomery) singing a lyric by E. Way and so appeared many others of the kind.

The boom of Jalousie stirred up a legal conflict with the Danish publishing house Wilhelm Hansen to which Gade had granted the royalties of all the pieces he would compose until a certain date. The composer did not stick to what was agreed and published Jalousie by his own publishing house, Gade & Warny, thinking that the contract had expired, on the same day of the above-mentioned premiere. The issue was solved after Gade yielded a part of his royalties.

The number was included totally or partially in over 100 movies, in numerous television series and on all new ways of playing back since records appeared.

== Estate ==
When Gade drew up his will in 1956, he included his wish that all his estate and future royalties were granted to a foundation that had to be created under his name to sponsor young talented musicians. Explaining that reason, he said: «I still remember the financial and educational difficulties I had when I was young, when I arrived in Copenhagen with the purpose of making a living with music».

With his will he opened a bank account with the deposit of 100,000.00 DDK. In 1993 the publishing house founded by Gade sued Hansen's for the huge figures that the latter collected as royalties from “Jalousie”, but the court passed judgment against the former. Agreements had to be respected.

Every year the foundation holds a contest for young violinists in Gade's hometown. On 8 November 1970 a postage stamp commemorating the centenary of his birth was issued.

There is a peculiar arrangement of “Jealousy” for a woodwind quintet which was premiered on the celebration of the twentieth anniversary of the accession to the throne of the queen Margaret of Denmark, in the Elsinore Castle in June 1992.

== Recordings ==
In 1998 Dacapo Recordings published a record with a part of his works—some unpublished—performed by the Odense Symphonic Orchestra conducted by Mathias Aeschbacher featuring the soloist Bjarne Hansen on violin. Critics commented: «It is incredible that an unknown and so good music has been displayed because of the popularity of “Jealousy”».

Written to accompany the silent era blockbuster Son of Zorro when Gade was leader of the orchestra of the Palads Cinema, the tango premiered on 14 September 1925 and was an instant international hit. When talkies were introduced it was featured in numerous films.

== Music composition ==
The royalties allowed Gade to devote himself to composition full-time for the rest of his life. Arthur Fiedler made the first recording of the piece with the Boston Pops in 1935, further increasing Gade's income. The royalties now fund a foundation for young musicians. Fiedlers' recording was released in Australia and the UK on the His Masters' Voice label, credited as "The Boston Promenade Orchestra conducted by Arthur Fiedler".

As a symphony composer Gade did not fare as well. In an interview two years before his death, Fiedler recalled that Gade came especially to Boston to thank him for the recording. Gade also presented Fiedler with a score of a symphony which Fiedler recalled as "one of the worst pieces of music I ever looked at".
