= 1992 Olympics =

1992 Olympics may refer to:

- 1992 Summer Olympics, which were held in Barcelona, Spain
- 1992 Winter Olympics, which were held in Albertville, France
