= Bilbao Exhibition Centre =

Exhibition centre in Barakaldo, Spain

- BEC
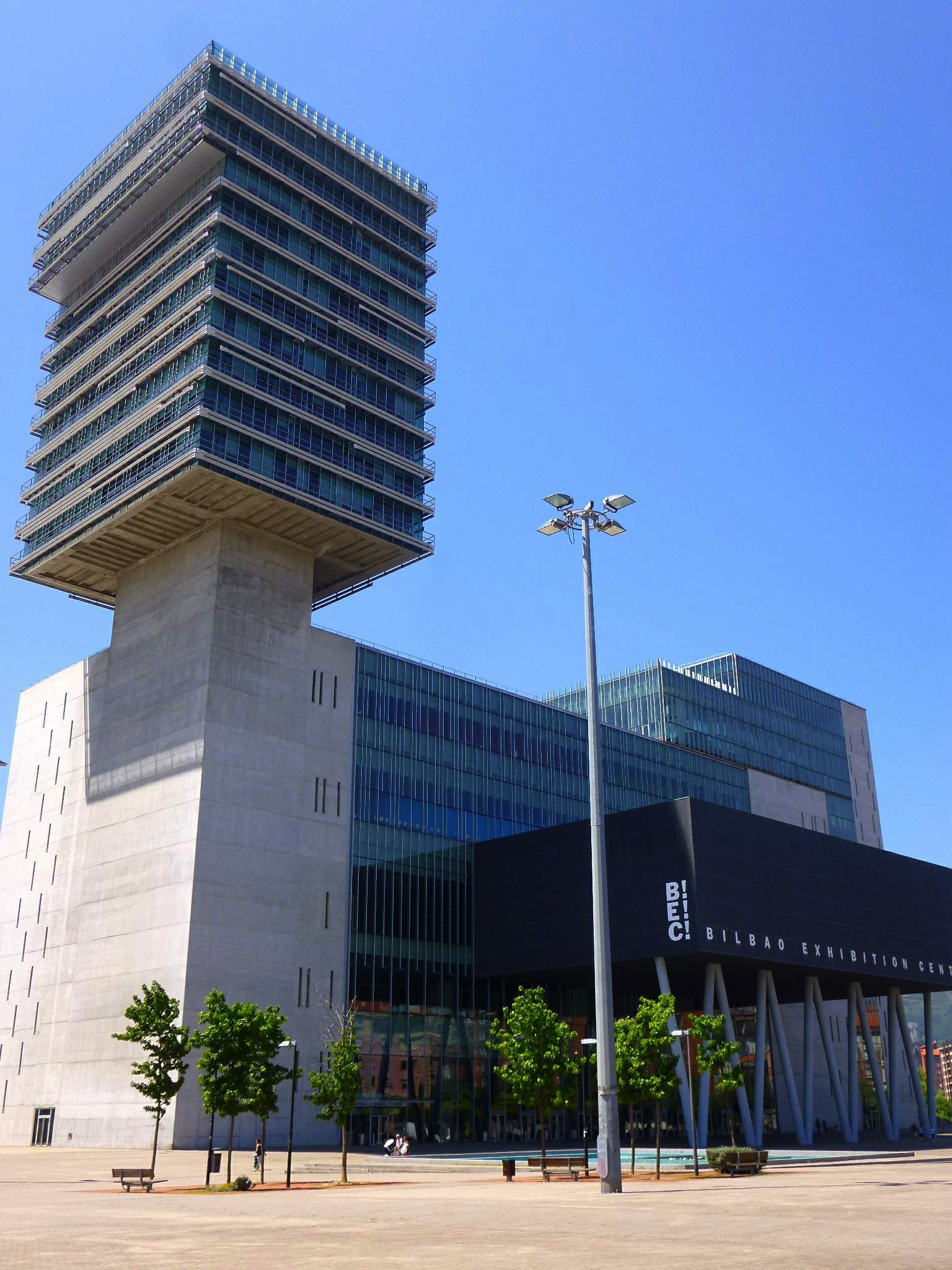
- BEC entrance.
- Interactive map of Bilbao Exhibition Centre
- Location: Barakaldo, Basque Country, Spain
- Coordinates: 43°17′22″N 2°59′23″W
- Public transit: Bilbao Metro: Line 2 at Ansio

Construction
- Opened: April 2004
- Architect: ACXT
- Project managers: Celos Fonseca; Javier Vergar; Jon Ochoca; Javier Ruiz de Prada
- Structural engineer: Fernando del Campo

Website
- bilbaoexhibitioncentre.com

The Bilbao Exhibition Centre (BEC) is an exhibition centre in Barakaldo, Basque Country, Spain. The current headquarters of the Feria de Muestras de Bilbao, its facilities are located on land formerly occupied by the Basque iron company Altos Hornos de Vizcaya in the neighbourhood of Ansio in Barakaldo, in the Greater Bilbao area. These facilities, opened in April 2004, allow for high capacity international fairs with better services, infrastructure, and connections than the previous facilities in central Bilbao.

The Bilbao Exhibition Centre is jointly owned by the Basque Government, the Provincial Council of Biscay, Bilbao Municipal Council, Barakaldo Municipal Council and the Bilbao Chamber of Commerce.

== Overview ==
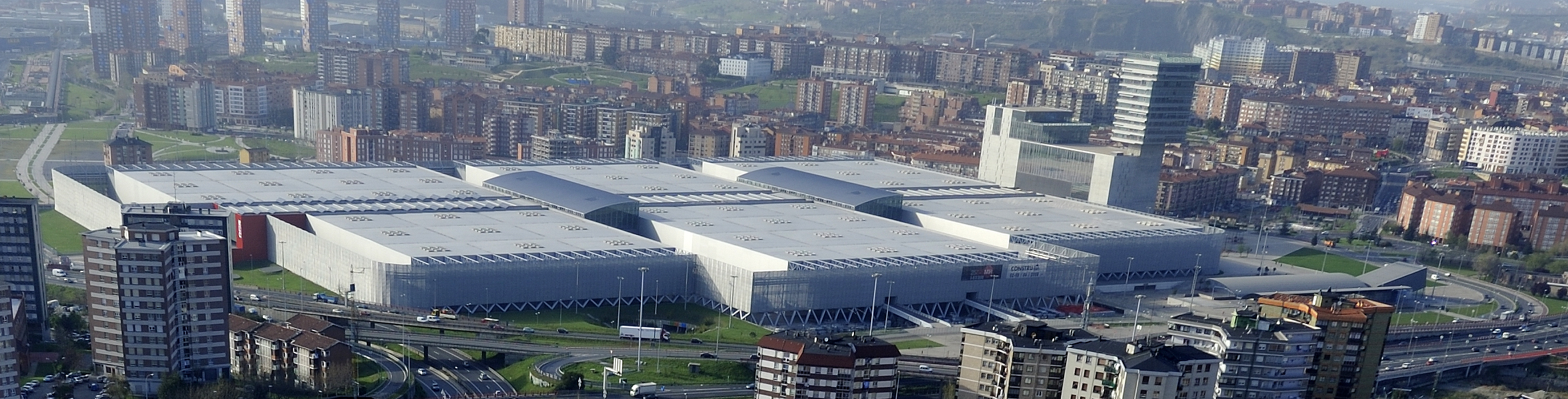
Aerial view of the BEC complex

The Bilbao Exhibition Centre covers an area of 251,055 square metres (2,702,330 sq ft), of which 246,457 square metres (2,652,840 sq ft) are distributed in six pavilions without any columns intended for exhibitions, while the rest houses a shopping mall and a hotel. In addition to the exhibition halls, the complex has a VIP hall, a conference centre, 6,500 square feet (600 m^{2}) dedicated to office space, and a large atrium. It also has an underground car park with capacity for 4,000 vehicles.

On the roof, a photovoltaic solar energy park has been installed, and it has become one of the largest the Basque Country. The park has 628 solar photovoltaic panels and achieves an output of 100 kW in an area of 1,000 square metres (11,000 sq ft).

== BEC Tower ==
The BEC Tower, at 92.83 metres (304.6 ft) high, was the tallest building the Basque Country when it opened, which was higher than the BBVA Tower in central Bilbao, at 88 metres (289 ft) in height. In 2009, the title of tallest building went to the Iberdrola Tower, which was finished in 2011 and has a height of 165 metres.

A restaurant and the offices of the BEC company are located in the tower.

== Bizkaia Arena ==
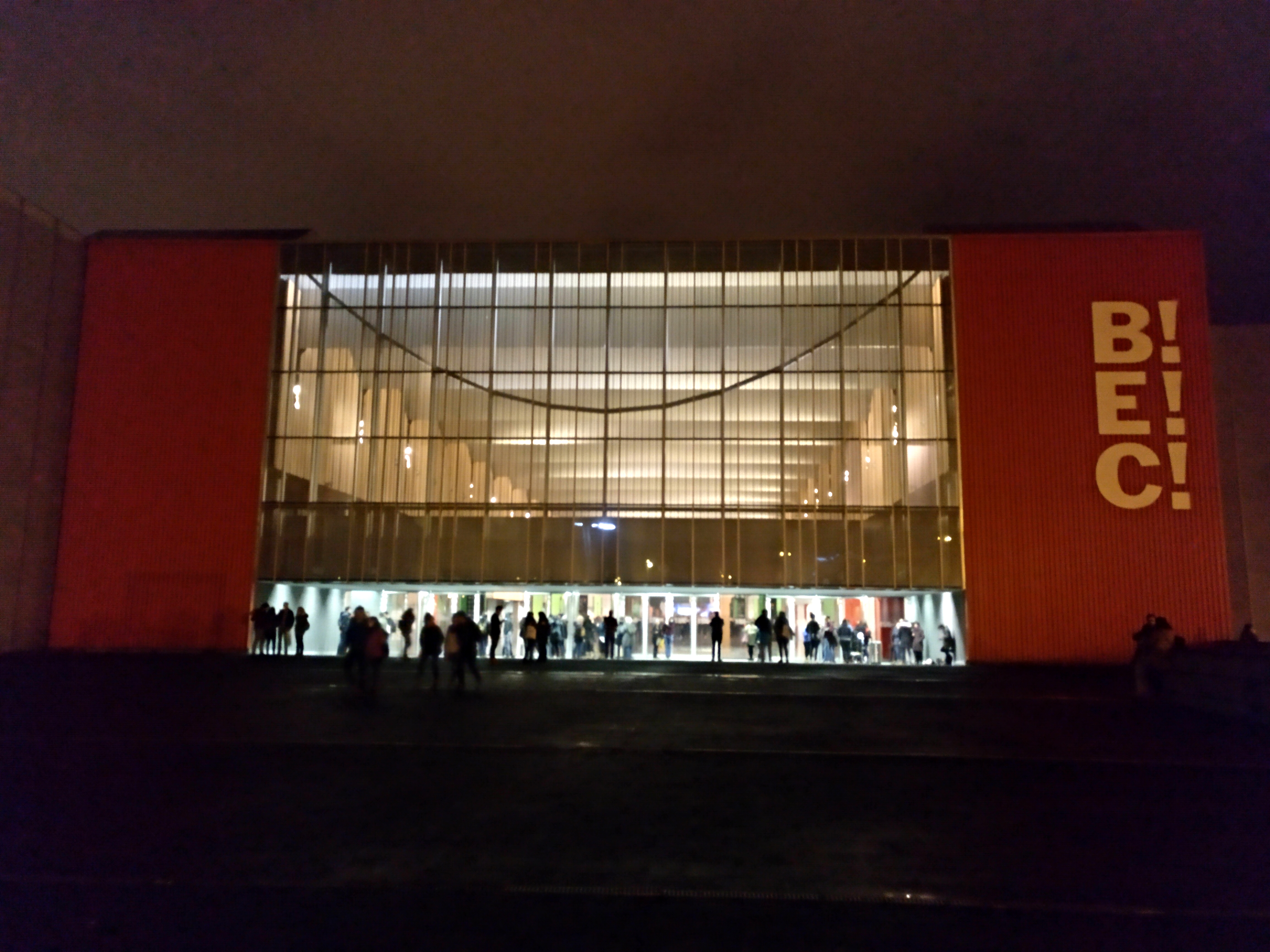
Entrance to the Bizkaia Arena at night (2017)

Bizkaia Arena is the largest multi-purpose hall in Spain, since it can accommodate up to 26,000 people, and 18,640 for most indoor sports. It forms part of Bilbao Exhibition Centre (BEC) complex.

The venue regularly hosts basketball matches. Between 2009 and 2010, it was the home arena of Bilbao Basket; in 2007 and 2008, it was also used several times for its most popular matches. The arena was the venue of the final stage of the 2010 Copa del Rey de Baloncesto, and was one of the sites of 2014 FIBA Basketball World Cup, hosted by Spain.

The arena hosted the annual MTV Europe Music Awards in 2018 as the awards show was held in Spain for the third time and the first time in Bilbao.

== Fairs, contests and celebrations ==
Several national and international fairs are regularly held in the BEC facilities, including Ferroforma, the Biennial Machine-Tool Fair (BIEMH), and the Euskal Encounter. In the Bizkaia Arena, basketball games, plays, motocross races, and music concerts are held. The main political parties in the region hold campaign events and sometimes their congresses there. Similarly, several labour unions and business organisations hold a variety of meetings and conventions. The Jehovah's Witnesses have held their May and December meetings there for several years.

== Transport ==
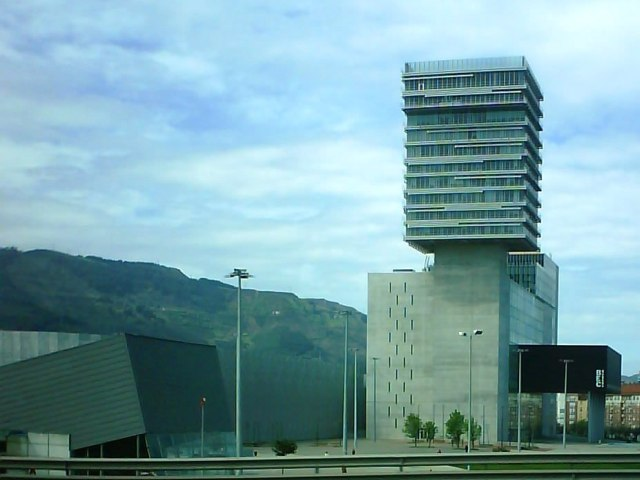
Ansio station on the left, next to BEC Tower.

Alongside the construction of the BEC, Ansio station on Line 2 of the Bilbao Metro was built. The station deals with heavy passenger traffic when there is some event at the BEC, so the Bilbao Metro offers special services for such events, such as delaying the closing time and stepping up frequencies. Also, opposite the main entrance of the BEC, there are two Bizkaibus stops: one for the 3142 line (connection with the underground), and line 3136; also close to that entry there is an occasional shuttle service, as well as a bus terminal, which is not in use at this time. Around the centre are other Bizkaibus stops.
