= 1986 FIG Rhythmic Gymnastics World Cup =

International rhythmic gymnastics competition

The 1986 FIG Rhythmic Gymnastics World Cup was the second Rhythmic Gymnastics World Cup, held from October 17 to 19 in Tokyo, Japan. The competition was officially organized by the International Gymnastics Federation.

The top 18 individuals and top 8 groups from the 1985 World Championships qualified for the event.

In the individual event, the 1983 World Cup all-around champion, Lilia Ignatova, defended her all-around title after receiving multiple perfect 10 scores. It was her final competition. Tatiana Druchinina was in second place for most of the competition, and an error in her last routine meant that she tied with Galina Beloglazova for bronze. Bianka Panova, the reigning World bronze medalist, dropped a club in her last routine and finished in fourth.

== Medalists ==
Event	Gold	Silver	Bronze	Ref.
Individual all-around	(Bulgaria) Lilia Ignatova	(Soviet Union) Galina Beloglazova (Soviet Union) Tatiana Druchinina	—N/a	
Rope	(Bulgaria) Lilia Ignatova	(Soviet Union) Marina Lobach	(Bulgaria) Bianka Panova (Soviet Union) Tatiana Druchinina	
Ball	(Bulgaria) Bianka Panova (Bulgaria) Lilia Ignatova	—N/a	(Soviet Union) Galina Beloglazova (Soviet Union) Tatiana Druchinina	
Clubs	(Bulgaria) Lilia Ignatova	(Soviet Union) Tatiana Druchinina	(Bulgaria) Bianka Panova	
Ribbon	(Bulgaria) Bianka Panova	(Bulgaria) Lilia Ignatova	(Soviet Union) Galina Beloglazova	
Group all-around	Bulgaria	Soviet Union	North Korea	

== Medal table ==
Rank	Nation	Gold	Silver	Bronze	Total
1	Bulgaria (BUL)	7	1	2	10
2	Soviet Union (URS)	0	5	4	9
3	North Korea (PRK)	0	0	1	1
Totals (3 entries)		7	6	7	20

== See also ==
- World Rhythmic Gymnastics Championships
- FIG World Cup
- List of medalists at the FIG World Cup Final
