= Iliana Ilieva =

Bulgarian rhythmic gymnast

- Илиана Илиева
- Born: 23 July 1966 (age 60) Kyustendil

Gymnastics career
- Discipline: Rhythmic gymnastics
- Country represented: Bulgaria
Medal record
Representing Bulgaria
Rhythmic Gymnastics
World Championships
Gold medal – first place	1983 Strasbourg	Group

Iliana Ilieva (Bulgarian: Илиана Илиева; born 23 July 1966) is a retired Bulgarian rhythmic gymnast. She is a World Championships gold medalist.

== Biography ==
Ilieva began training at the local rhythmic gymnastics school of her native Kyustendil. As a member of the Bulgarian national group, she won all-around gold at the 1983 World Championships in Strasbourg, along Paulina Nikolova, Mariela Spasova, Tsvetomira Filipova, Victoria Dimitrova and Svetla Chobanova.

Following becoming a world champion she was awarded the Order of the Red Banner of Labor, and the title of "Honorary Citizen of Kyustendil".

In 2018 she was awarded as one of the Golden Girls of Bulgaria during the World Championships in Sofia.
