= Venera Zaripova =

Soviet rhythmic gymnast

- Венера Зарипова
- Full name: Venera Zinnurovna Zaripova
- Born: 5 April 1966 (age 60) Tash-Kömür, Kyrgyz SSR

Gymnastics career
- Discipline: Rhythmic gymnastics
- Country represented: Soviet Union
- Head coach: Irina Viner
- Former coach: Olga Tulubaeva
- Retired: 1987
Medal record
Representing Soviet Union
Rhythmic Gymnastics
USSR Championships
| Gold medal – first place | 1981 Kiev | Clubs |
| Gold medal – first place | 1982 Tallinn | Rope |
| Gold medal – first place | 1983 Astrakhan | Freehands |
| Gold medal – first place | 1986 Vilnius | Hoop |
| Silver medal – second place | 1981 Kiev | All-around |
| Silver medal – second place | 1981 Kiev | Rope |
| Silver medal – second place | 1982 Tallinn | Hoop |
| Silver medal – second place | 1983 Astrakhan | All-around |
| Silver medal – second place | 1983 Astrakhan | Hoop |
| Bronze medal – third place | 1981 Kiev | Ribbon |
| Bronze medal – third place | 1983 Astrakhan | Ribbon |
| Bronze medal – third place | 1983 Astrakhan | Ball |

Venera Zinurovna Zaripova (Russian: Венера Зиннуровна Зарипова; born 5 April 1966 in Tash-Kömür, Kyrgyz SSR, USSR) is a former individual Soviet rhythmic gymnast. She is a two-time all-around silver medalist and 4-time gold medalist in the USSR Championships.

== Career ==
Venera was the 5th and last child of a Tatar family. Her mother was a housewife, her father worked as a miner. Soon after, the family moved to Uchkuduk, Uzbekistan. At 5 years old Zaripova started ballet, then began gymnastics. Her first coach in rhythmic gymnastics was Olga Tulubaeva. To pursue gymnastics, Venera had to drop out of the music school.

At 9 years of age, she met with then head coach of Uzbek rhythmic gymnastics Irina Viner, Zaripova would soon be under Viner's tutelage and would become her first successful rhythmic gymnastics student. In 1978, Venera relocated to Tashkent and began training with the sport under Viner's class.

At age 14, she became a member the USSR team. Venera won the all-around silver at the 1981 USSR Championships beating Irina Deriugina who took the bronze medal. She won another all-around silver at the 1983 USSR Championships behind Dalia Kutkaitė. Zaripova made the Soviet team with (Galina Beloglazova and Dalia Kutkaitė) who competed at the 1983 World Championships, Zaripova finished 13th in all-around after a drop out of carpet from her hoop, she qualified to 2 apparatus finals finishing 4th in ribbon and 7th in clubs. In 1984, Zaripova began to struggle with injury, she competed in her last USSR Championships in 1986 and won the gold in hoop.

In 1988, during the end of her gymnastics career, Venera graduated from Tashkent State Institute of Law. In 1990, she was invited to coach in rhythmic gymnastics in Israel. In 1993, she married an Israeli businessman David Levy, they have a daughter named Irina and two sons. She now resides in Eilat, Israel and annual international rhythmic gymnastics competition is held called the "Venera Cup". She still occasionally performs in galas in international meet invitations and in Moscow, Russia.
