= Paulina Nikolova =

Bulgarian rhythmic gymnast and coach

- Паулина Николова
- Born: 3 June 1967 (age 59)
- Spouse: Iliya Dyakov
- Relatives: Stiliana Nikolova (daughter)

Gymnastics career
- Discipline: Rhythmic gymnastics
- Country represented: Bulgaria
Medal record
Representing Bulgaria
Rhythmic Gymnastics
World Championships
Gold medal – first place	1983 Strasbourg	Group
Gold medal – first place	1985 Valladolid	Group

Paulina Nikolova née Kratseva (Bulgarian: Паулина Николова; born 3 June 1967) is a retired Bulgarian group rhythmic gymnast who now coaches. She was a double gold medalist at the World Championships. Nikolova was one of the Golden Girls of Bulgaria that dominated rhythmic gymnastics in the 1980s.

== Biography ==
Nikolova was born in Sofia and grew up in Pancharevo in a house with no running water or indoor plumbing. Her father taught history and geography at a high school, and she has one brother. The family moved to an apartment in Sofia in 1976, where Nikolova enrolled in gymnastics lessons.

She initially had no coach; she and another girl would go to the national team's training hall and practice on their own. In 1977, a coach there noticed her talent and began to train her. She joined the national team in 1983, and that year, she became a member of the national senior group.

As a member of the group, she won all-around gold at the 1983 World Championships in Strasbourg. At the 1984 European Championships, the group won another all-around gold medal. The next year, group retained their World title at the 1985 World Championships in Valladolid. Nikolova retired from competing that year at age 18 as she could not handle the training workload any longer, though she made several attempts at returning to the sport.

After her retirement, she began working as an assistant coach and met her husband, Iliya Dyakov, a former football player who represented Bulgaria at the 1986 World Cup. She has three children with him: Paola, Denis and Stiliana. Stiliana is a successful rhythmic gymnast who began training with her older sister Paola before she moved alone to Bulgaria for training at age 13. In 1993, Nikolova returned from maternity leave, but she was fired from her coaching position. Her former personal coach suggested she go to teach in Cairo.

Nikolova moved with her family to Cairo after she received a contract as a rhythmic gymnastics coach at the New Giza club, where she still works along her daughter Paola. She coached the Egyptian team that took silver at the 2010 Summer Youth Olympics.
