= Iliya Dyakov =

Bulgarian footballer

Personal information
- Full name: Iliya Dyakov
- Date of birth: 29 September 1963 (age 63)
- Place of birth: Dobrich, Bulgaria
- Position: Defender

Senior career*
Years	Team	Apps	(Gls)
1983–1986	Dobrudzha Dobrich	?	(?)
1986–1988	CSKA Sofia	8	(0)
1988–1989	Dobrudzha Dobrich	?	(?)
1989–1991	Slavia Sofia	32	(0)

International career
1985–1986	Bulgaria	5	(0)

Managerial career
- 2010–2011: ENPPI (assistant)
- * Club domestic league appearances and goals

Iliya Dyakov (Bulgarian: Илия Дяков; born 29 September 1963) is a Bulgarian former footballer who played as a defender. He was selected for the Bulgaria squad at the 1986 FIFA World Cup but did not play. He did play in the qualifying campaigns for the 1986 tournament, winning 5 caps. In club football, he spent his whole career in his native country, where he represented his hometown club Dobrudzha Dobrich, CSKA Sofia, and Slavia Sofia.

He is married to Paulina Nikolova, a group rhythmic gymnast who competed for Bulgaria and is the 1985 World Group all-around champion. Together they have 3 children, Paola, Denis and Stiliana who is a successful rhythmic gymnast.
