= Anelia Ralenkova =

Bulgarian rhythmic gymnast (born 1963)

- Born: 25 December 1963 (age 62) Sofia

Gymnastics career
- Discipline: Rhythmic gymnastics
- Country represented: Bulgaria
- Eponymous skills: Ralenkova: 360 degree rotation on back
Medal record
Representing Bulgaria
World Championships
Gold medal – first place	1981 Munich	All-around
Gold medal – first place	1981 Munich	Clubs
Gold medal – first place	1983 Strasbourg	Hoop
Silver medal – second place	1981 Munich	Rope
Silver medal – second place	1981 Munich	Hoop
Silver medal – second place	1983 Strasbourg	All-around
Bronze medal – third place	1981 Munich	Ribbon
Bronze medal – third place	1983 Strasbourg	Ball
Bronze medal – third place	1983 Strasbourg	Clubs
Bronze medal – third place	1983 Strasbourg	Ribbon
European Championships
Gold medal – first place	1982 Stavanger	All-around
Gold medal – first place	1982 Stavanger	Rope
Gold medal – first place	1982 Stavanger	Hoop
Gold medal – first place	1984 Vienna	All-around
Gold medal – first place	1984 Vienna	Hoop
Gold medal – first place	1984 Vienna	Ball
Gold medal – first place	1984 Vienna	Clubs
Silver medal – second place	1982 Stavanger	Clubs
Bronze medal – third place	1984 Vienna	Ribbon
World Cup Final
Gold medal – first place	1983 Belgrade	Ball
Gold medal – first place	1983 Belgrade	Clubs
Bronze medal – third place	1983 Belgrade	All-around

Anelia Ralenkova (Bulgarian: Анелия Раленкова; born 25 December 1963) is a Bulgarian former individual rhythmic gymnast. She is one of the "Golden Girls" of Bulgaria that dominated rhythmic gymnastics in the 1980s. She now works as a coach.

== Biography ==
She won gold medals at both world and European championships, but missed competing at the Summer Olympics in 1984 due to the Soviet-led boycott. Her coaches were Zlatka Boneva and Neshka Robeva.

The 1982 European Championships were successful for Ralenkova, who placed first in the all-around and with rope and hoop, and second with clubs. At the 1983 World Championships, Ralenkova fumbled with ribbon and was defeated by teammate Diliana Gueorguieva. Ralenkova shared the silver medal with another teammate, Lilia Ignatova, and Soviet Galina Beloglazova. Ralenkova won a collection of medals in event finals but was just edged out of every title except hoop (she also earned bronze for ball, clubs, and ribbon).

At the Friendship Games, she moved up from fifth place on the first day of competition to second place in the all-around on the second. She retired after the 1984 European Championships in November, where she tied for all-around gold with Beloglazova after Beloglazova's last score was raised. Ralenkova expressed anger about the result, saying that "Rhythmic gymnastics is no longer a competition between athletes, but a competition between judges." She finished the individual apparatus finals with golds for hoop, ball, and clubs and a bronze for ribbon.

In 1989, the U.S. Gymnastics Federation invited Ralenkova to do clinics, workshops, and sports promotions in a 35-city tour across the U.S. She began a gym in Seattle before moving to Palm Beach, Florida in 2001 and coaching there. She has one son.

== Eponymous skill ==
Ralenkova has one eponymous skill listed in the code of points, a turn of 360 degrees performed with the gymnast's back on the floor.

Name	Description	Difficulty (Note: Valid for the 2022-2024 Code of Points)
Ralenkova	Rotation on the back 360	0.1 each rotation
