= Lori Fung =

Canadian rhythmic gymnast and coach

- Full name: Lori Fung Methorst
- Born: February 21, 1963 (age 63) Vancouver, British Columbia, Canada

Gymnastics career
- Discipline: Rhythmic gymnastics
- Country represented: Canada
- Head coach: Liliana Dimitrova
Medal record
Women's gymnastics
Representing Canada
Rhythmic Gymnastics
Olympic Games
Gold medal – first place	1984 Los Angeles	All-around

Lori Fung Methorst, CM OBC (馮黎明; born February 21, 1963) is a Canadian gymnastics coach and retired individual rhythmic gymnast. She won the gold medal in rhythmic gymnastics at the 1984 Summer Olympics, the year the sport was introduced to the Olympics.

== Early life ==
Fung was born and raised in Vancouver, Canada. Her father is Chinese, and her mother is Japanese. She was part of her elementary school gymnastics club. One of her teachers noticed her level of skill and suggested she try rhythmic gymnastics. She began training in the sport in 1976.

== Career ==
Fung began artistic gymnastics in 1976 but soon switched to rhythmic gymnastics. Although she was considered a late starter in the sport, she was very passionate about training and progressed unusually quickly. She completed her high school education by distance education due to her demanding training schedule.

In 1981, she competed at her first World Championships, where she placed 30th in the all-around. In 1982, she won the silver all-around medal at the Four Continents Gymnastics Championships and also a gold in the clubs final. That year, she traveled by herself to train in Bulgaria for a month with some of the top-ranked gymnasts in the world.

She was a three-time Canadian rhythmic gymnastics champion prior to her Olympic debut in 1984 and went on to win seven consecutive national titles. The year before the Olympics, she placed 23rd at the 1983 World Championships, but she was able to raise her ranking in subsequent meets in order to qualify for the games. In early 1984, she spent six weeks training in Romania.

Rhythmic gymnastics was officially added as an Olympic sport at the 1984 Olympic Games. That year, the gymnasts from Bulgaria and USSR were favored to win, but the Eastern led Boycott of the 1984 Summer Olympics meant the top gymnasts were absent from the competition. In June 1984, she competed in Japan against gymnasts she knew from Bulgaria; Lilia Ignatova gave her a four-leaf clover and asked her to win the gold medal in her stead.

Fung trained with Romanian rhythmic gymnast Doina Stăiculescu who was, as a result of the boycott, the highest ranking rhythmic gymnast competing at the inaugural Olympic event. Fung finished in third place during qualification behind Stăiculescu and her Romanian teammate, Aline Dragan, who finished first and second respectively. Her parents, who had not expected her to qualify for the final, had not purchased tickets for the final event and resorted to standing outside with a sign saying they were the parents of a gymnast searching for tickets, which they were eventually able to obtain.

In the final, Fung upset the Romanian team to become the first gymnast to win an Olympic gold medal in rhythmic gymnastics. Her gold medal was initially missed by Canadian journalists, many of whom had gone out for dinner instead of covering the event; although they had checked the leader board before leaving, her country was incorrectly listed as China instead of Canada.

One contributing factor to her win was her ribbon routine. The strong breeze created by the air conditioning caused issues for all gymnasts during their ribbon routines, though the organizers would not turn it down for fear that the computers used for scoring would overheat. In one interview after her win, Fung said her coach had lied to her that the air conditioning had been turned up before her routine and to not let the ribbon be carried away, which led to her working her apparatus harder to compensate. In another, later interview, Fung described noting which way the air was being blown to position herself so her ribbon wouldn't tangle. She received the highest ribbon score of the competition.

Fung also credited her pianist, Donna Forward, with being a crucial part of her victory. She also said that she and her coach had studied how to achieve peak performance twice in a short period of time, allowing her to compete well in Europe beforehand and then peak again for the Olympics, and that she thought she was advantaged by the fact that she arrived later than many of her competitors, who she thought may have been worn out by the time of the competition.

The year after the Olympics, she finished in 9th place at the 1985 World Championships. Two years later, she did not compete at the 1987 World Championships due to a bout of appendicitis. Although she intended to compete at the 1988 Summer Olympics, she became ill with a virus, developed tendinitis in her feet, and broke her heel shortly before the Games.

Fung retired from competition in 1988. She went on to become a coach, including a role as national team coach for Canada, and to co-own a Vancouver gymnastics club.

== Personal life ==
Fung married Dean Methorst in 1996. They have three children.

== Honours ==
- In 1985, she was inducted into the BC Sports Hall of Fame.
- In 1985, she was made a Member of the Order of Canada.
- In 1990, she was awarded the Order of British Columbia.
- In 2004, she was inducted into Canada's Sports Hall of Fame.
