= Dalia Kutkaitė =

Lithuanian rhythmic gymnast

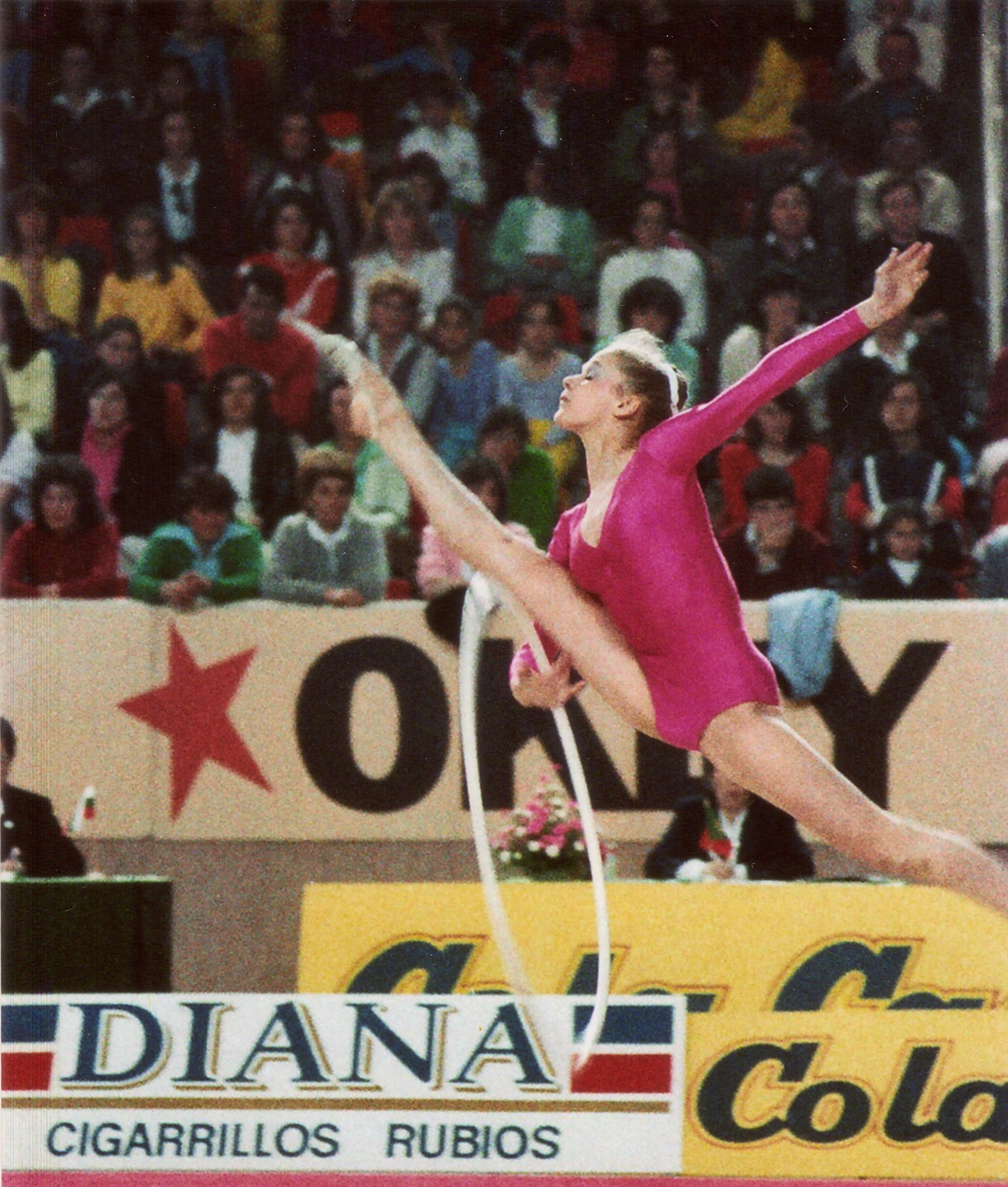
- Kutkaitė in 1984

Personal information
- Born: 11 February 1965 (age 61) Vilnius, Lithuania SSR, Soviet Union

Gymnastics career
- Discipline: Rhythmic gymnastics
- Country represented: Soviet Union
- Head coach: Vaida Kubilienė
- Former coach: Aldona Giriūnienė
- Retired: yes
Medal record
Rhythmic gymnastics
Representing Soviet Union
World Championships
Bronze medal – third place	1983 Strasbourg	Clubs
Bronze medal – third place	1983 Strasbourg	Hoop
European Championships
Gold medal – first place	1982 Stavanger	All-around
Gold medal – first place	1982 Stavanger	Clubs
Gold medal – first place	1982 Stavanger	Ribbon
Silver medal – second place	1982 Stavanger	Hoop
Silver medal – second place	1984 Vienna	Ball
Bronze medal – third place	1984 Vienna	Hoop
World Cup Final
Gold medal – first place	1983 Belgrade	Ribbon
Silver medal – second place	1983 Belgrade	All-around

Dalia Kutkaitė (born 11 February 1965 in Vilnius, Lithuania) is retired Lithuanian rhythmic gymnast who competed for the Soviet Union. She is the 1982 European all-around champion and the 1983 World Cup Final all-around silver medalist. She is the most successful Lithuanian rhythmic gymnast to date.

== Career ==
Kutkaitė started rhythmic gymnastics at age 7 years old under the advice of a kindergarten teacher to her mother, her first coach was Aldona Giryunine. She started out in the sport as sickly, frail, lacked musicality and dynamism under Vaida Kubiliene's tutelage. After feeling being left behind by other gymnasts, Kutkaitė improved significantly and carefully examining the mistakes of others, she would become one of the leading Soviet gymnast of the 1980s along (with Marina Lobatch, Galina Beloglazova, and Tatiana Druchinina).

The 1980s marked the golden age of the Bulgarian rhythmic gymnasts, yet Kutkaitė was amongst the leading gymnasts who defended for the medals of the Soviet Union.

Kutkaitė's first Worlds was at the 1981 World Championships where she finished 5h in all-around, At the 1982 European Championships, she was competing against a strong Bulgarian Team yet Kutkaitė won with her complex, original and fast routines with calm like style. She defeated Lilia Ignatova of Bulgaria, winning gold in (all-around, clubs, ribbon) and silver medals in (ball, hoop).

She won bronze medals in hoop and clubs at the 1983 World Rhythmic Gymnastics Championships in Strasbourg. The culmination of the first World Cup Final held in Belgrade in 1983, Kutkaitė won the all-around silver medal behind Bulgarian Lilia Ignatova, Kutkaitė won gold in ribbon.

From 1978 to 1983 she won 15 titles in Lithuanian Championships.

After her retirement, she completed her University degree. Many years until 2015 she lived and worked as a trainer in Spain. An annual international competition, the Dalia Kutkaite Cup is held in Vilnius, Lithuania.
