= Beloglazov =

Beloglazov (masculine, Russian: Белоглазов) or Beloglazova (feminine, Russian: Белоглазова) is a Russian surname. Notable people with the surname include:

- Anatoly Beloglazov (born 1956), Russian Soviet sport wrestler
- Galina Beloglazova (born 1967), Russian Soviet rhythmic gymnast
- Julia Beloglazova (born 1987), Ukrainian pair skater
- Sergei Beloglazov (born 1956), Russian Soviet sport wrestler
