= Diliana Georgieva =

Bulgarian rhythmic gymnast

- Born: 18 February 1965 (age 61) Pazardzhik

Gymnastics career
- Discipline: Rhythmic gymnastics
- Country represented: Bulgaria
- Club: Levski Club
Medal record
Representing Bulgaria
Rhythmic Gymnastics
World Championships
Gold medal – first place	1983 Strasbourg	All-around
Gold medal – first place	1983 Strasbourg	Clubs
Gold medal – first place	1983 Strasbourg	Ribbon
Gold medal – first place	1985 Valladolid	All-around
Gold medal – first place	1985 Valladolid	Rope
Gold medal – first place	1985 Valladolid	Ball
Gold medal – first place	1985 Valladolid	Clubs
Bronze medal – third place	1983 Strasbourg	Ball
Bronze medal – third place	1985 Valladolid	Ribbon
European Championships
Gold medal – first place	1984 Vienna	Clubs
Gold medal – first place	1984 Vienna	Ribbon
Bronze medal – third place	1984 Vienna	All-around

Diliana Georgieva (Bulgarian: Диляна Георгиева; born 18 February 1965) is a Bulgarian retired rhythmic gymnast. She was a two-time all-around World champion and one of the Golden Girls of Bulgaria that dominated Rhythmic Gymnastics in the 1980s. She was named the BTA Best Balkan Athlete of the Year in 1983.

== Biography ==
Georgieva was born in Pazardzhik. Her mother, Violeta Behchiyska, was a rhythmic gymnast who competed at the first World Championships in rhythmic gymnastics in 1963 and later founded her own club. Georgieva began training under her mother. She later moved to the "Levski" club, and she joined the national team at age 13 and began to train with Neshka Robeva.

Recalling their training conditions decades later, Georgieva said that the national team would often train for fourteen hours a day, with a small break to study, and if one gymnast asked for a break, others were punished. She said that while she didn't feel forced to train, she and the other gymnasts were scared of Robeva. She also said they were regularly weighed and punished for going over the weight prescribed by their coaches. During one trip, Robeva locked them in their hotel room, and they snuck out to eat.

Georgieva's breakthrough was at the 1983 World Championships in Strasbourg, when she won the gold medal in the all-around over her teammates Lilia Ignatova and Anelia Ralenkova as well as Soviet gymnast Galina Beloglazova. In the apparatus finals, she won two more golds for clubs and ribbon as well as a bronze for ball. That year, she won the Balkan Athlete of the Year award.

In 1984, Georgieva placed third at the 1984 European Championships but won the gold medal in the clubs and ribbon finals. She was highly favored to win the 1984 Olympics Games but missed competing because of the Eastern Bloc boycott. Georgieva instead competed at the Friendship Games, where she won the all-around. The next year, she went on to win her second all-around gold medal at the 1985 World Championships. She also won a bronze medal for ribbon and a gold medal for ball, clubs and rope in the event finals.

In 1985, Diliana Georgieva retired and married Bulgarian pentathlon champion Vladimir Klintcharov. They have three children together. After coaching in Japan and England, Georgieva was invited to coach in New Zealand, where the couple now lives. She coached the New Zealand national team for seven years before she and her husband opened a restaurant.

In August 2020, Belinda Moore, a former internationally competitive New Zealand rhythmic gymnast and a student of Georgieva's, came forward with allegations of abuse during her career from both coaches and Gymnastics New Zealand. She said that more than once, she went to live with Georgieva for weeks at a time to lose weight, and she alleged that she was "starved" and weighed multiple times a day during those periods.

Georgieva denied starving Moore, saying that "she was eating what we were eating". She added that "I was just trying to help her look better. She had potential. She was super talented." Moore said that she was not angry with Georgieva, knowing how she was treated during her competitive years, but that Gymnastics New Zealand should have been more aware of the cultures foreign coaches came from and that they neglected to monitor coaching practices.
