= Doina Stăiculescu =

Romanian rhythmic gymnast

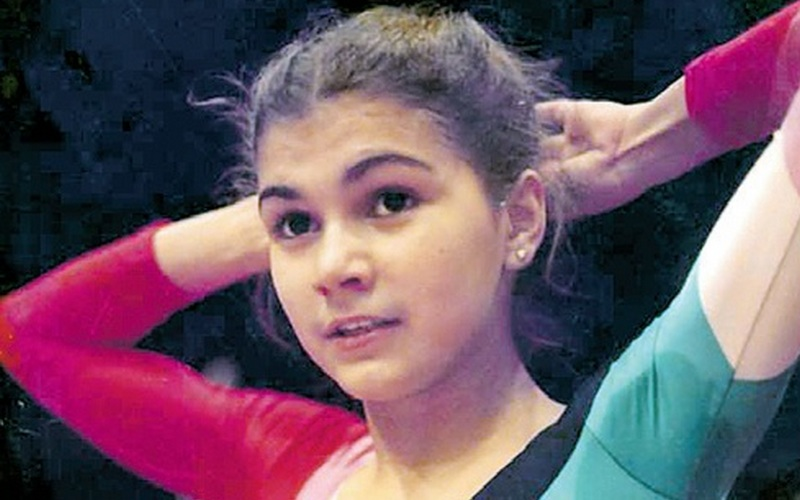
- Stăiculescu at the 1984 Olympics

Personal information
- Born: 7 December 1967 (age 58) Bucharest, Romania
- Height: 156 cm (5 ft 1 in)

Gymnastics career
- Discipline: Rhythmic gymnastics
- Country represented: Romania
Medal record
Rhythmic Gymnastics
Representing Romania
Olympic Games
Silver medal – second place	1984 Los Angeles	All-around

Doina Stăiculescu (born 7 December 1967) is a Romanian former individual rhythmic gymnast. She won the silver medal at the 1984 Summer Olympics, the Olympics where rhythmic gymnastics was introduced as an Olympic event. She now works as a coach.

== Early life ==
Stăiculescu was born 7 December 1967 in Bucharest. Her uncle, a former boxer, advised her parents to start her in gymnastics as she was very energetic. She began training at age 6.

== Career ==
Stăiculescu began competing internationally at junior competitions by 1981. She was a three-time Romanian national champion from 1983 to 1985.

She competed at the 1982 European Championships and finished in 11th place. Her only appearance at the World Championships was next year at the 1983 World Championships, where she placed sixth in the all-around and qualified for three apparatus finals: ball, clubs, and ribbon.

At the time of rhythmic gymnastics was officially set to debut as an Olympic sport at the 1984 Olympic Games in Los Angeles, the gymnasts from USSR and Bulgaria were considered the favourites to win, but the Eastern led Boycott of the 1984 Summer Olympics left Stăiculescu the highest-ranking gymnast to compete in the Olympic event.

Canadian gymnast Lori Fung (ranked 23rd in the world at the time), trained in Romania ahead of the games, though Stăiculescu denies that they trained together. Despite finishing first in qualification, Stăiculescu, like many gymnasts, struggled with her ribbon routine due to the strong air conditioning. She finished in second place in the final to win the silver medal, having been beaten to the first Olympic gold medal in rhythmic gymnastics by Fung by 0.05 points. She is the only Romanian to win an Olympic medal in rhythmic gymnastics.

After the Olympics, she competed in November at the 1984 European Championships. She finished in 6th place in the all-around and qualified for the hoop final, where she tied for 5th.

In 2000, she was awarded the Medal for Merit, second class. She now coaches rhythmic gymnastics at a private school.
