= 1983 World Rhythmic Gymnastics Championships =

- Location: Strasbourg, France
- Start date: 10 November 1983
- End date: 13 November 1983

The 1983 World Rhythmic Gymnastics Championships were held in Strasbourg, France on November 10–13, 1983. They served as the qualification process for the first Olympic program of rhythmic gymnastics to be held in Los Angeles in 1984, although most of the gymnasts from Eastern Europe, which had the most dominant rhythmic gymnasts, ended up not participating in the Games due to the boycott by the Communist Bloc.

93 individuals and 21 groups competed; groups competed an exercise with hoops and ropes. Two floors were provided, one with carpet, which most gymnasts used, and one with wood, which was easier to spin and slide on.

In the individual event, Bulgarian gymnasts dominated the competition, only challenged by Soviet gymnasts. After the first day of the all-around, the Soviet gymnasts Dalia Kutkaitė and Galina Beloglazova tied for first, followed by the three Bulgarian gymnasts. However, on the second day, Kutkaitė dropped her hoop; Beloglazova had a strong first routine, but she, too, dropped her apparatus (clubs) during her last exercise. The three Bulgarian gymnasts performed more strongly, allowing them to move onto the podium; Diliana Georgieva ended in first place by 0.05 points, while Beloglazova and the other two Bulgarians, Lilia Ignatova and Anelia Ralenkova, tied for second.

The three individual Bulgarians were awarded twelve perfect 10.0 scores across the competition, and the three Soviets were given six. The number of perfect scores given, including five in the ball final, caused American sports photographer Eileen Langsley to comment that it was "indicative of the rising standards within gymnastics but also suggests that the code needs restructuring".

Three judges from the qualification rounds were not allowed to judge in the finals due to national bias in their qualification scores, which Andrea Schmid, a judge from the United States, noted as a first for the World Championships.

== Participants ==
The following countries sent competitors: Australia, Austria, Belgium, Brazil, Bulgaria, Canada, China, Cuba, Cyprus, Czechoslovakia, Denmark, East Germany, Finland, France, Hungary, Israel, Italy, Japan, Netherlands, New Zealand, North Korea, Norway, Poland, Portugal, Romania, Spain, Sweden, Switzerland, United Kingdom, United States, Soviet Union, West Germany, and Yugoslavia.

=== Individual ===
Nation	Name	Nation	Name	Nation	Name	Nation	Name
Australia	Gail Duquenin	Cuba	Roxana Merino-Martinez	Japan	Hiroko Yamasaki	Spain	Marta Canton
Australia	Karen Ho	Cyprus	Antoniadou Eftythia	Netherlands	Irma Borgsteede	Spain	Pino Diaz
Australia	Ann Maree Kerr	Czechoslovakia	Libuse Mojžíšová	Netherlands	Maud van Helvoort	Sweden	Viktoria Bengtsson
Austria	Karin Elmer	Czechoslovakia	Daniela Záhorovská	Netherlands	Esther Hielckert	Sweden	Eva Bergstroem
Austria	Elke Göschl	Denmark	Susanne Ravn	New Zealand	Tania Moss	Sweden	Helena Rosander
Austria	Gertrude Ramsauer	East Germany	Bianca Dittrich	New Zealand	Karen Schultz	Switzerland	Fränzi Grogg
Belgium	Caroline Vlerick	East Germany	Katrin Huschke	New Zealand	Angela Walker	Switzerland	Suzanne Müller
Belgium	Sarina Roberti	East Germany	Heide Krause	North Korea	Yenn Ran Kang	Switzerland	Grazia Verzasconi
Belgium	Dominique Thiebaut	Finland	Heli Honko	North Korea	Zai Ran Kim	United Kingdom	Jacqueline Leavy
Brazil	Rosane Favila Ferreira	Finland	Leena Murtamo	North Korea	Ok Sun Zang	United Kingdom	Lorraine Priest
Brazil	Laura Monteiro	France	Benedicte Augst	Norway	Ingvild Landro	United Kingdom	Julie Ramsden
Brazil	Maria Luisa Santos	France	Valerie Bonvoisin	Norway	Anne Langmoen	United States	Michelle Berube
Bulgaria	Diliana Guerguieva	France	Christel Roger	Norway	Shirin Zorriassateiny	United States	Lydia Bree Crabtree
Bulgaria	Lilia Ignatova	Hungary	Agnes Bencsina	Poland	Teresa Folga	United States	Valerie Zimring
Bulgaria	Anelia Ralenkova	Hungary	Andrea Sinko	Poland	Dorota Koslowska	Soviet Union	Galina Beloglazova
Canada	Aimee Brender	Hungary	Zsuzsa Turak	Poland	Anna Klos-Sulima	Soviet Union	Dalia Kutkaitė
Canada	Adrianne Dunnett	Israel	Liath Haninovlitz	Portugal	Margarida Carmo	Soviet Union	Venera Zaripova
Canada	Lori Fung	Israel	Hanit Turner	Portugal	Maria Joao Falcao	Germany	Claudia Scharmann
People's Republic of China	Xianyuan Huang	Italy	Manuela Agnolucci	Portugal	Christina Lebre	Germany	Regina Weber
People's Republic of China	Weihong Li	Italy	Christina Cimino	Romania	Alina Dragan	Germany	Claudia Ziburski
People's Republic of China	Yu Tao	Italy	Giulia Staccioli	Romania	Doina Staiculescu	SFR Yugoslavia	Lidija Milicevic
Cuba	Perez Caridad	Japan	Erika Akiyama	Romania	Anca C. Zota	SFR Yugoslavia	Milena Reljin
Cuba	Medina Lourdes	Japan	Hiroko Otsuka	Spain	Marta Bobo	SFR Yugoslavia	Danijela Simić

=== Groups ===
Countries who participated in the group competition are as follows.

Flag	Nation	Flag	Nation	Flag	Nation	Flag	Nation
	Australia		Czechoslovakia		New Zealand		United States
	Brazil		Finland		North Korea	Soviet Union	USSR
	Bulgaria		France		Norway		West Germany
	Canada		Italy		Spain		
People's Republic of China	China		Japan		Sweden		
	Cuba		Netherlands		Switzerland		

== Medal table ==
Place	Country	Gold	Silver	Bronze	Total
1	Bulgaria	7	2	5	14
2	USSR	2	3	2	7
3	North Korea	0	0	1	1

== Individual Final ==
=== Individual All-Around ===
Place	Nation	Name	Hoop	Ball	Clubs	Ribbon	Total
1	Bulgaria	Diliana Guerguieva	9.800	9.950	10.000	9.900	39.650
2	Soviet Union	Galina Beloglazova	9.900	10.000	9.800	9.900	39.600
2	Bulgaria	Lilia Ignatova	9.800	10.000	10.000	9.800	39.600
2	Bulgaria	Anelia Ralenkova	9.900	9.950	10.000	9.750	39.600
5	Soviet Union	Dalia Kutkaitė	9.800	9.900	9.900	9.850	39.450
6	Romania	Doina Staiculescu	9.700	9.800	9.800	9.600	38.900
7	East Germany	Bianca Dittrich	9.600	9.700	9.750	9.550	38.600
8	Czechoslovakia	Libuse Mojžíšová	9.800	9.650	9.500	9.550	38.500
8	Germany	Regina Weber	9.600	9.650	9.500	9.750	38.500
10	Spain	Marta Bobo	9.750	9.750	9.650	9.200	38.350
11	Czechoslovakia	Daniela Záhorovská	9.600	9.450	9.700	9.450	38.200
12	North Korea	Zai Ran Kim	9.700	9.400	9.500	9.500	38.100
13	North Korea	Yenn Ran Kang	9.650	9.600	9.600	9.200	38.050
13	Soviet Union	Venera Zaripova	8.800	9.650	9.800	9.800	38.050
15	Spain	Marta Canton	9.600	9.450	9.550	9.300	37.900
16	Hungary	Agnes Bencsina	9.450	9.300	9.500	9.550	37.800
17	Romania	Alina Dragan	9.650	9.300	9.300	9.500	37.750
17	Italy	Giulia Staccioli	9.650	9.650	9.350	9.100	37.750
19	East Germany	Heide Krause	9.750	9.500	9.400	9.050	37.700
19	Romania	Anca C. Zota	9.550	9.500	9.300	9.350	37.700
21	People's Republic of China	Xianyuan Huang	9.400	9.350	9.450	9.450	37.650
22	SFR Yugoslavia	Milena Reljin	9.550	9.450	9.500	9.100	37.600
23	Canada	Lori Fung	9.150	9.250	9.600	9.550	37.550
24	Poland	Teresa Folga	9.600	9.200	9.250	9.400	37.450
25	Poland	Dorota Koslowska	9.600	9.550	9.000	9.250	37.400
25	North Korea	Ok Sun Zang	9.700	9.450	9.000	9.250	37.400
27	Japan	Erika Akiyama	9.500	9.250	9.150	9.350	37.250
27	Germany	Claudia Scharmann	9.300	9.150	9.650	9.150	37.250
27	SFR Yugoslavia	Danijela Simić	9.300	9.300	9.500	9.150	37.250
30	Italy	Christina Cimino	9.400	9.150	9.200	9.400	37.150
31	Italy	Manuela Agnolucci	9.500	9.450	8.850	9.300	37.100
31	France	Benedicte Augst	9.150	9.400	9.250	9.300	37.100
33	Switzerland	Grazia Verzasconi	9.350	9.150	9.350	9.200	37.050
34	Sweden	Viktoria Bengtsson	9.300	8.950	9.400	9.350	37.000
34	United States	Michelle Berube	9.300	9.100	9.250	9.350	37.000
34	Poland	Anna Klos-Sulima	9.100	9.350	9.200	9.350	37.000
34	Hungary	Andrea Sinko	9.450	9.350	9.200	9.000	37.000
34	Japan	Hiroko Yamasaki	8.800	9.100	9.550	9.550	37.000
39	People's Republic of China	Weihong Li	9.050	9.000	9.450	9.350	36.850
40	Spain	Pino Diaz	9.400	9.350	9.400	8.650	36.800
40	Hungary	Zsuzsa Turak	8.750	9.600	9.000	9.450	36.800
40	Netherlands	Maud van Helvoort	9.050	9.300	9.500	8.950	36.800
43	Cuba	Roxana Merino-Martinez	9.150	9.150	9.250	9.200	36.750
44	Cuba	Medina Lourdes	9.450	8.950	9.350	8.950	36.700
44	Norway	Shirin Zorriassateiny	9.350	9.000	9.050	9.300	36.700
46	Cuba	Perez Caridad	9.200	9.050	9.150	9.250	36.650
46	East Germany	Katrin Huschke	8.800	9.300	9.300	9.250	36.650
48	Netherlands	Irma Borgsteede	9.150	9.050	9.150	9.200	36.550
48	United States	Valerie Zimring	9.550	8.950	8.850	9.200	36.550
50	France	Christel Roger	9.250	9.100	9.000	9.150	36.500
51	Norway	Anne Langmoen	9.300	8.950	9.000	9.150	36.500
52	Switzerland	Suzanne Müller	9.150	9.050	9.450	8.750	36.400
52	Germany	Claudia Ziburski	9.350	8.950	9.050	9.050	36.400
54	Australia	Karen Ho	9.150	9.050	9.150	9.000	36.350
54	United Kingdom	Jacqueline Leavy	9.200	9.050	9.000	9.100	36.350
54	Belgium	Caroline Vlerick	9.200	8.750	9.250	9.150	36.350
57	Brazil	Rosane Favila Ferreira	9.300	9.000	9.200	8.800	36.300
57	Netherlands	Esther Hielckert	9.050	8.750	9.400	9.100	36.300
59	France	Valerie Bonvoisin	9.400	8.950	8.900	9.000	36.250
60	New Zealand	Tania Moss	9.200	8.800	9.400	8.800	36.200
61	Canada	Adrianne Dunnett	9.350	9.150	8.600	9.000	36.100
61	Portugal	Maria Joao Falcao	9.150	8.800	9.450	8.700	36.100
63	Switzerland	Fränzi Grogg	9.350	8.600	9.050	9.050	36.050
64	Portugal	Margarida Carmo	9.100	8.650	9.150	9.100	36.000
64	Australia	Ann Maree Kerr	8.950	8.800	9.150	9.100	36.000
66	United States	Lydia Bree Crabtree	8.800	8.650	9.350	9.150	35.950
67	Brazil	Maria Luisa Santos	9.200	8.950	9.150	8.600	35.900
67	United Kingdom	Lorraine Priest	8.750	8.700	9.300	9.150	35.900
67	United Kingdom	Julie Ramsden	8.850	8.700	9.300	9.150	35.900
67	Denmark	Susanne Ravn	9.200	8.650	9.000	9.050	35.900
67	New Zealand	Angela Walker	9.200	8.700	9.050	8.950	35.900
72	Portugal	Christina Lebre	9.100	8.700	8.850	9.200	35.850
72	SFR Yugoslavia	Lidija Milicevic	8.750	8.950	9.150	9.000	35.850
72	Belgium	Sarina Roberti	9.200	8.700	9.000	8.950	35.850
75	Austria	Elke Göschl	9.000	8.800	9.050	8.900	35.750
75	Japan	Hiroko Otsuka	9.500	9.150	9.200	7.900	35.750
77	Norway	Ingvild Landro	9.150	8.800	8.800	8.900	35.650
77	People's Republic of China	Yu Tao	8.450	8.900	9.300	9.000	35.650
79	Israel	Liath Haninovlitz	8.800	8.750	9.300	8.750	35.600
80	Austria	Gertrude Ramsauer	9.000	8.650	9.000	8.850	35.500
81	Canada	Aimee Brender	9.200	8.900	8.750	8.550	35.400
81	Sweden	Helena Rosander	9.050	8.350	9.250	8.750	35.400
83	Finland	Heli Honko	9.100	9.100	8.450	8.500	35.150
84	Sweden	Eva Bergstroem	8.850	8.750	8.650	8.850	35.100
84	Austria	Karin Elmer	8.650	8.900	8.950	8.600	35.100
86	New Zealand	Karen Schultz	9.100	8.350	8.700	8.900	35.050
87	Israel	Hanit Turner	8.400	8.700	9.050	8.650	34.800
88	Finland	Leena Murtamo	8.550	8.600	8.400	8.750	34.300
89	Belgium	Dominique Thiebaut	8.550	8.300	8.800	8.550	34.200
90	Australia	Gail Duquenin	8.400	8.650	8.550	8.550	34.150
91	Brazil	Laura Monteiro	7.550	8.750	8.900	8.450	33.650
92	Cyprus	Antoniadou Eftyhia	7.200	8.000	8.700	7.850	31.750

=== Individual Hoop ===
Place	Nation	Name	All Around	Hoop	Total
1	Bulgaria	Anelia Ralenkova	9.900	10.000	19.900
2	Soviet Union	Galina Beloglazova	9.900	9.900	19.800
3	Bulgaria	Lilia Ignatova	9.800	9.850	19.650
3	Soviet Union	Dalia Kutkaitė	9.800	9.850	19.650
5	Czechoslovakia	Libuse Mojžíšová	9.800	9.800	19.600
6	Bulgaria	Diliana Guerguieva	9.800	9.750	19.550
6	East Germany	Heide Krause	9.750	9.800	19.550
8	Spain	Marta Bobo	9.750	9.700	19.450

=== Individual Ball ===
Place	Nation	Name	All Around	Hoop	Total
1	Soviet Union	Galina Beloglazova	10.000	10.000	20.000
1	Bulgaria	Lilia Ignatova	10.000	10.000	20.000
3	Bulgaria	Diliana Guerguieva	9.950	10.000	19.950
3	Bulgaria	Anelia Ralenkova	9.950	10.000	19.950
5	Soviet Union	Dalia Kutkaitė	9.900	10.000	19.900
6	Romania	Doina Staiculescu	9.800	9.850	19.650
7	Spain	Marta Bobo	9.750	9.800	19.550
8	East Germany	Bianca Dittrich	9.700	9.800	19.500

=== Individual Clubs ===
Place	Nation	Name	All Around	Clubs	Total
1	Bulgaria	Diliana Guerguieva	10.000	10.000	20.000
1	Bulgaria	Lilia Ignatova	10.000	10.000	20.000
3	Soviet Union	Dalia Kutkaitė	9.900	10.000	19.900
3	Bulgaria	Anelia Ralenkova	10.000	9.900	19.900
5	Soviet Union	Galina Beloglazova	9.800	10.000	19.800
6	Romania	Doina Staiculescu	9.800	9.900	19.700
7	East Germany	Bianca Dittrich	9.750	9.850	19.600
7	Soviet Union	Venera Zaripova	9.800	9.800	19.600

=== Individual Ribbon ===
Place	Nation	Name	All Around	Ribbon	Total
1	Soviet Union	Galina Beloglazova	9.900	10.000	19.900
1	Bulgaria	Diliana Guerguieva	9.900	10.000	19.900
3	Bulgaria	Anelia Ralenkova	9.750	10.000	19.750
4	Bulgaria	Lilia Ignatova	9.800	9.900	19.700
4	Soviet Union	Venera Zaripova	9.800	9.900	19.700
6	Soviet Union	Dalia Kutkaitė	9.850	9.800	19.650
7	Germany	Regina Weber	9.750	9.600	19.350
8	Romania	Doina Staiculescu	9.600	9.600	19.200

== Group ==
=== Preliminaries ===
Place	Nation	First Exercise	Second Exercise	Total
1	Bulgaria	19.600	19.200	38.800
2	USSR	19.550	19.250	38.800
3	North Korea	19.050	19.350	38.400
4	Czechoslovakia	18.900	19.300	38.200
4	Spain	19.000	19.200	38.200
6	West Germany	18.500	19.000	37.500
7	China	18.400	18.950	37.350
8	Japan	18.400	18.900	37.700
9	France	18.200	18.500	36.700
10	Italy	17.400	18.500	35.900
11	Norway	17.600	18.000	35.600
12	Canada	17.800	17.600	35.400
13	Netherlands	17.500	17.800	35.300
13	Cuba	17.850	17.450	35.300
15	Sweden	17.500	17.550	35.050
16	Finland	17.200	17.700	34.900
17	Brazil	17.200	17.600	34.800
18	USA	16.950	17.700	34.650
19	Switzerland	17.700	16.750	34.450
20	New Zealand	17.100	16.400	33.500
21	Australia	16.150	16.350	32.500

=== Finals ===
Place	Nation	Average	Final	Total
1	Bulgaria	19.400	19.900	39.300
2	USSR	19.400	19.800	39.200
3	North Korea	19.200	19.600	38.800
4	Czechoslovakia	19.100	19.250	38.350
5	Spain	19.100	19.150	38.250
6	West Germany	18.750	19.250	38.000
7	Japan	18.650	19.100	37.750
8	China	18.675	19.050	37.725
