= Tatiana Druchinina =

Soviet rhythmic gymnast

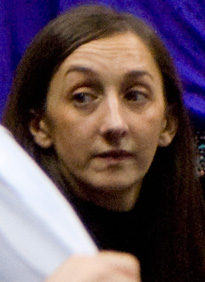
- Druchinina in 2010

Personal information
- Full name: Tatiana Rudolfovna Druchinina
- Born: 18 April 1969 (age 57) Omsk, RSFSR, Soviet Union

Gymnastics career
- Discipline: Rhythmic gymnastics
- Country represented: Soviet Union
- Club: Yubileyny
- Retired: 1988
Medal record
Representing Soviet Union
World Championships
Gold medal – first place	1987 Varna	Ribbon
Bronze medal – third place	1985 Valladolid	Clubs
European Championships
Gold medal – first place	1986 Florence	Ball
World Cup Final
Silver medal – second place	1986 Tokyo	All-around
Silver medal – second place	1986 Tokyo	Clubs
Bronze medal – third place	1986 Tokyo	Rope
Bronze medal – third place	1986 Tokyo	Ball
Goodwill Games
Gold medal – first place	1986 Moscow	All-around
Gold medal – first place	1986 Moscow	Rope
Gold medal – first place	1986 Moscow	Ball
Gold medal – first place	1986 Moscow	Ribbon

Tatiana Rudolfovna Druchinina (Russian: Татьяна Рудольфовна Дручинина; born 18 April 1969) is a Russian former rhythmic gymnast who represented the Soviet Union. She is the 1987 World champion in ribbon and the 1986 World Cup Final all-around silver medalist, Merited Master of Sports in Rhythmic Gymnastics, Honored coach of Russia and figure skating choreographer.

== Personal life ==
Druchinina was born on 18 April 1969 in Omsk, Russian SFSR, Soviet Union. She was married to two-time Olympic pair skating champion Artur Dmitriev from the 1990s to 2006. Their son, Artur Dmitriev Jr., was born in September 1992 and has competed in figure skating for Russia.

== Rhythmic gymnastics career ==
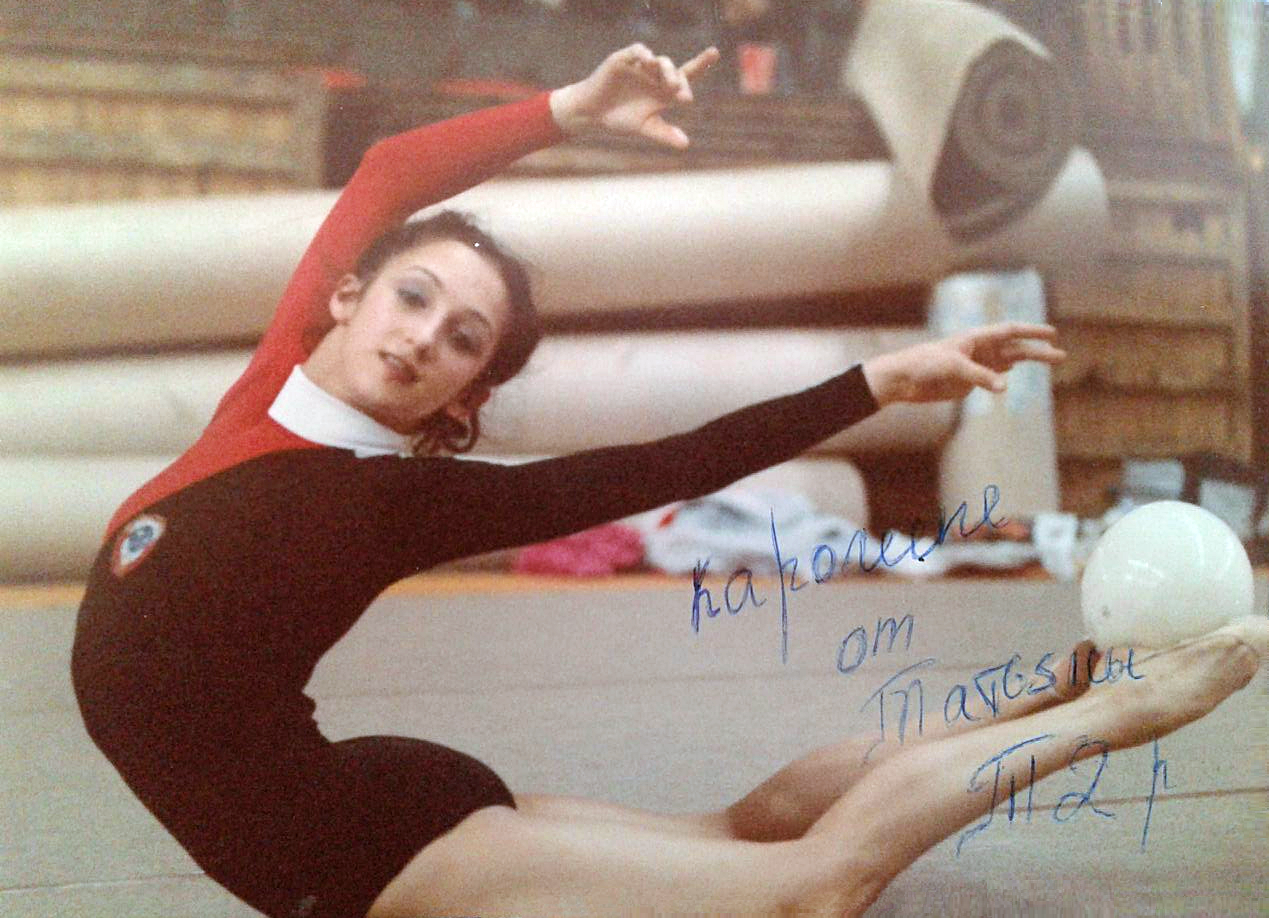
Druchinina in a 1986 practice session.

Tatiana Druchinina was among the Soviet Union's leading gymnasts in the 1980s, along with Marina Lobatch, Galina Beloglazova, and Dalia Kutkaitė. Although she never won a World or European all-around medal, Druchinina finished high in the standings.

At the 1984 European Championships, she came in 6th in the all-around. At the 1985 World Championships, she won the bronze medal in clubs, finished 6th in all-around and 4th with rope and ribbon.

Druchinina placed 4th in all-around at the 1986 Europeans (first on ball, 4th with rope and clubs). She won four gold medals at the 1986 Goodwill Games (all-around, rope, ball, and ribbon). She tied for the all-around silver medal (with teammate Galina Beloglazova) at the 1986 World Cup Final, as well as winning silver in clubs and bronze medals in rope and ball. She finished 6th in all-around at the 1987 World Championships and won gold in ribbon. Druchinina also briefly performed as a member of the Soviet group exercises.

In 1988, Druchinina sustained a back injury and was withdrawn from the Europeans; rising teammate Olexandra Tymoshenko substituted her in the Soviet team and went on to win the 1988 European Championships and the bronze medal at the 1988 Seoul Olympics. Druchinina retired from gymnastics at the end of the 1988 season.

== Figure skating career ==
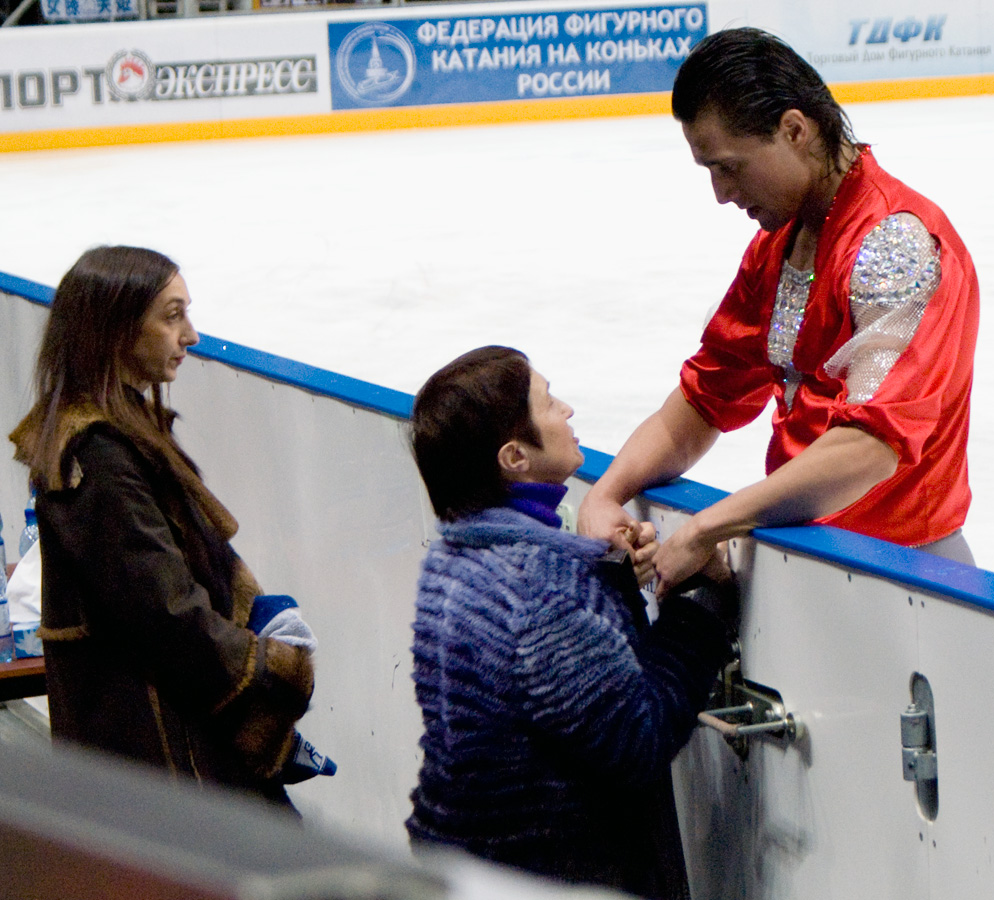
Druchinina with Tamara Moskvina and Alexander Smirnov

Druchinina lived in the United States from 1993 to 2007. She worked with single skaters, including Sarah Hughes and Sasha Cohen, pair skaters Ekaterina Gordeeva / Sergei Grinkov, and ice dancers in Evgeny Platov's group. After returning to Russia, she worked for many years at the Sports Palace "Jubilee" Club in Saint Petersburg with the sports group and pairs of Tamara Moskvina. In 2011, she moved to Moscow, where she briefly coached her son, Artur Dmitriev Jr. She collaborated with Svetlana Alexeeva's ice dancing students in the 2011–12 season and with Alexander Zhulin's ice dancers.

Her former clients include:

- Elena Berezhnaya / Anton Sikharulidze
- Tatiana Navka / Roman Kostomarov
- Yuko Kavaguti / Alexander Smirnov
- Katarina Gerboldt / Alexander Enbert
- Yuri Shevchuk
- Artur Dmitriev Jr.
- Nikolai Morozov
- Aleksandra Boikova / Dmitrii Kozlovskii
