= 1985 World Rhythmic Gymnastics Championships =

- Location: Valladolid, Spain
- Start date: 10 October 1985
- End date: 13 October 1985

1985 World Rhythmic Gymnastics Championships were held in Valladolid, Spain on October 10–13, 1985.

For the third year in a row, Bulgarian gymnasts swept the competition: the three individual Bulgarian gymnasts won all three all-around medals, and the Bulgarian group won gold. Diliana Georgieva won her second consecutive World title, and Lilia Ignatova won her third consecutive all-around silver medal at the World Championships.

== Participants ==
Gymnasts from 35 countries participated. There were 21 groups and 93 individual competitors.

The following countries sent competitors: Australia, Austria, Belgium, Brazil, Bulgaria, Canada, China, Cuba, Czechoslovakia, Denmark, East Germany, Finland, France, Greece, Hungary, Israel, Italy, Japan, The Netherlands, New Zealand, North Korea, Norway, Poland, Portugal, Romania, South Korea, Spain, Sweden, Switzerland, Turkey, The United Kingdom, USA, USSR, West Germany and Yugoslavia.

=== Individual ===
Nation	Name	Nation	Name	Nation	Name	Nation	Name
Australia	Antonietta Guida	Denmark	Marlene Franzen	Netherlands	Irma Borgsteede	Sweden	Viktoria Bengtsson
Australia	Nicole Higham	Denmark	Susanne Ravn	Netherlands	Esther Hielckert	Sweden	Anna Ekholtz
Austria	Gundrun Frick	East Germany	Bianca Dittrich	Netherlands	Sophie Toenbreker	Sweden	Carina Engdahl
Austria	Gerlinde Hemmer	East Germany	Heide Krause	New Zealand	Patria Hume	Switzerland	Caroline Müller
Austria	Gertrude Ramsauer	Finland	Heli Honko	New Zealand	Tania Moss	Turkey	Tuba Akincilar
Belgium	Laurence Brihaye	Finland	Leena Murtamo	New Zealand	Angela Walker	Turkey	Sebnem Ozcakir
Belgium	Dominique Thiebaut	Finland	Eeva-Liisa Naehri	North Korea	Ok Sun Djang	United Kingdom	Jacqueline Leavy
Brazil	Sulamita Almeida	France	Benedicte Augst	North Korea	Yenn Ran Kang	United Kingdom	Peta Machin
Brazil	Rosane Favila Ferreira	France	Christel Bruneau	Norway	Ellen Gunderson	United Kingdom	Lorraine Priest
Brazil	Sandra Magalhaes	France	Annette Walle	Norway	Victoria Ystborg	United States	Marina Kunyavsky
Bulgaria	Diliana Gueorguieva	Greece	Maria Alevizou	Norway	Schirin Zorriassateiny	United States	Stacy Oversier
Bulgaria	Lilia Ignatova	Greece	Elena Kaitetzidou	Poland	Teresa Folga	United States	Diane Simpson-Bundy
Bulgaria	Bianka Panova	Greece	Dezi Tsakiri	Poland	Izabela Zuravska	Soviet Union	Galina Beloglazova
Canada	Lori Fung	Hungary	Andrea Sinko	Portugal	Margarida Carmo	Soviet Union	Tatiana Druchinina
Canada	Lise Gautreau	Hungary	Zsuzsa Turak	Portugal	Patricia Jorge	Soviet Union	Marina Lobatch
Canada	Adriane Mark	Israel	Einat Argaman	Portugal	Ana Peleira	Germany	Bettina Bothor
People's Republic of China	Xiaomin He	Israel	Shulamit Goldstein	Romania	Floretina Butaru	Germany	Kristin Frühwirth
People's Republic of China	Qiong Pang	Israel	Liath Haninovlitz	Romania	Alina Dragan	Germany	Simone Hildebrant
People's Republic of China	Yanfei Xia	Italy	Annalisa Bianchi	South Korea	Rhin Chae	SFR Yugoslavia	Natacha Perin
Cuba	Mirtha Echevarria	Italy	Christina Cimino	South Korea	Sung-Hee Hong	SFR Yugoslavia	Milena Reljin
Cuba	Thalia Fung	Italy	Giulia Staccioli	South Korea	In-Wha Kim	SFR Yugoslavia	Danijela Simić
Cuba	Roxana Merino-Martinez	Japan	Erika Akiyama	Spain	Marta Canton		
Czechoslovakia	Denisa Sokolovská	Japan	Keiko Hamada	Spain	Virginia Manzanera		
Czechoslovakia	Daniela Záhorovská	Japan	Hiroko Otsuka	Spain	Montse Manzanares		

=== Groups ===
Countries who participated in the group competition are as follows.

Flag	Nation	Flag	Nation	Flag	Nation	Flag	Nation
	Austria		Finland		New Zealand		United States
	Brazil		France		North Korea	Soviet Union	USSR
	Bulgaria		Hungary		Norway		West Germany
	Canada		Italy		Spain		
People's Republic of China	China		Japan		Sweden		
	East Germany		Netherlands		The United Kingdom		

== Medal table ==
Place	Country	Gold	Silver	Bronze	Total
1	Bulgaria	8	1	3	12
2	USSR	1	2	2	5
3	North Korea	0	1	0	1
4	East Germany	0	0	1	1

== Individual Final ==
=== Individual All-Around ===
Place	Nation	Name	Rope	Ball	Clubs	Ribbon	Total
1	Bulgaria	Diliana Guerguieva	10.000	9.950	10.000	9.950	39.900
2	Bulgaria	Lilia Ignatova	9.900	9.950	10.000	9.950	39.800
3	Bulgaria	Bianka Panova	9.900	9.950	9.900	10.000	39.750
4	Soviet Union	Galina Beloglazova	9.850	9.900	9.850	10.000	39.600
5	East Germany	Bianca Dittrich	9.800	9.950	9.850	9.950	39.550
6	Soviet Union	Tatiana Druchinina	9.850	9.800	9.950	9.900	39.500
7	Soviet Union	Marina Lobatch	9.900	9.850	9.800	9.900	39.450
8	Romania	Florentina Butaru	9.700	9.800	9.800	9.800	39.100
9	Canada	Lori Fung	9.700	9.750	9.750	9.750	38.950
10	North Korea	Yenn Ran Kang	9.750	9.700	9.750	9.700	38.900
11	SFR Yugoslavia	Milena Reljin	9.700	9.600	9.800	9.700	38.800
11	Czechoslovakia	Daniela Záhorovská	9.650	9.750	9.650	9.750	38.800
13	Hungary	Zsuzsa Turak	9.600	9.650	9.700	9.800	38.750
14	East Germany	Heide Krause	9.750	9.800	9.350	9.800	38.700
15	Hungary	Andrea Sinko	9.700	9.650	9.650	9.650	38.650
15	North Korea	Ok Sun Djang	9.450	9.750	9.750	9.700	38.650
17	Poland	Teresa Folga	9.700	9.600	9.500	9.750	38.550
17	Spain	Monserrat Manzanares	9.600	9.600	9.650	9.700	38.550
19	Spain	Marta Canton	9.800	9.750	9.700	9.150	38.400
19	Romania	Alina Dragan	9.700	9.750	9.300	9.650	38.400
19	Japan	Hiroko Otsuka	9.450	9.750	9.550	9.650	38.400
22	Spain	Virginia Manzanera	9.550	9.750	9.550	9.500	38.350
22	Poland	Izabela Zuravska	9.600	9.650	9.500	9.600	38.350
24	Germany	Kristin Frühwirth	9.400	9.550	9.600	9.600	38.150
24	Germany	Simone Hildebrant	9.300	9.700	9.600	9.550	38.150
26	United States	Marina Kunyavsky	9.400	9.600	9.600	9.450	38.050
27	People's Republic of China	Yanfei Xia	9.400	9.400	9.600	9.600	38.000
28	Cuba	Mirtha Echvarria	9.400	9.400	9.550	9.550	37.900
29	Italy	Giulia Staccioli	9.150	9.650	9.600	9.450	37.850
30	Japan	Erika Akiyama	9.400	9.650	9.300	9.450	37.800
30	Cuba	Thalia Fung	9.100	9.500	9.550	9.650	37.800
32	France	Benedicte Augst	9.050	9.500	9.450	9.600	37.600
32	People's Republic of China	Xiaomin He	9.250	9.650	9.700	9.000	37.600
32	France	Annette Walle	9.050	9.450	9.550	9.550	37.600
35	Italy	Annalisa Bianchi	9.300	9.350	9.400	9.450	37.500
35	Japan	Keiko Hamada	9.250	9.350	9.400	9.500	37.500
37	Czechoslovakia	Denisa Sokolovská	9.450	9.400	9.300	9.300	37.450
38	Italy	Christina Cimino	9.400	9.600	9.300	9.100	37.400
38	Canada	Lise Gautreau	9.300	9.600	9.450	9.050	37.400
40	Finland	Eeva-Liisa Naehri	9.350	9.600	9.000	9.400	37.350
40	Netherlands	Sophie Toenbreker	9.100	9.400	9.450	9.400	37.350
42	People's Republic of China	Qiong Pang	9.500	9.550	9.200	9.050	37.300
43	Canada	Adriane Mark	9.200	9.500	9.300	9.200	37.200
43	SFR Yugoslavia	Danijela Simić	9.350	8.750	9.550	9.550	37.200
45	Sweden	Viktoria Bengtsson	9.400	9.450	9.050	9.200	37.100
45	Netherlands	Irma Borgsteede	9.050	9.400	9.300	9.350	37.100
45	Denmark	Susanne Ravn	9.300	9.250	9.200	9.350	37.100
45	Norway	Victoria Ystborg	9.400	9.350	9.100	9.250	37.100
49	Israel	Shulamit Goldstein	9.050	9.350	9.350	9.300	37.050
49	United States	Stacy Oversier	9.150	9.300	9.500	9.100	37.050
49	United States	Diane Simpson	9.200	9.450	9.300	9.100	37.050
52	Germany	Bettina Bothor	9.000	9.300	9.300	9.400	37.000
53	Finland	Heli Honko	9.050	9.600	9.200	9.100	36.950
53	Finland	Leena Murtamo	9.050	9.450	9.100	9.350	36.950
55	France	Christel Bruneau	9.200	9.300	9.400	9.000	36.900
56	Israel	Liath Haninovlitz	8.950	9.400	9.150	9.350	36.850
56	Portugal	Patricia Jorge	9.050	9.100	9.300	9.400	36.850
58	Norway	Ellen Gunderson	9.300	9.400	8.850	9.200	36.750
58	Cuba	Roxana Merino-Martinez	9.050	9.050	9.350	9.300	36.750
58	Norway	Shirin Zorriassateiny	9.100	9.150	9.150	9.350	36.750
61	New Zealand	Angela Walker	9.200	8.900	9.150	9.400	36.650
62	Brazil	Rosane Favila Ferreira	9.000	9.200	9.200	9.200	36.600
63	Portugal	Margarida Carmo	9.200	9.050	9.100	9.200	36.550
63	Netherlands	Esther Hielckert	9.050	9.400	9.250	8.850	36.550
65	New Zealand	Tania Moss	9.200	9.150	9.150	8.950	36.450
65	SFR Yugoslavia	Natacha Perin	9.150	9.300	9.000	9.000	36.450
67	Sweden	Anna Ekholtz	9.200	9.200	9.000	9.000	36.400
67	Australia	Antonietta Guida	9.150	9.150	9.000	9.100	36.400
69	Austria	Gerlinde Hemmer	8.800	9.450	8.900	9.200	36.350
70	Denmark	Malene Franzen	9.400	9.400	8.600	8.900	36.300
70	United Kingdom	Jacqueline Leavy	8.800	9.200	9.150	9.150	36.300
70	Austria	Gertrude Ramsauer	9.000	9.200	8.800	9.300	36.300
73	South Korea	Sung-Hee Hong	9.200	9.100	8.750	9.200	36.250
73	Portugal	Ana Peleira	8.800	9.000	9.150	9.300	36.250
75	Austria	Gundrun Frick	8.950	9.300	8.700	9.250	36.200
75	Switzerland	Caroline Müller	9.200	9.400	8.750	8.850	36.200
77	Brazil	Sulamita Almeida	8.850	9.250	9.150	8.850	36.100
77	Sweden	Carina Engdahl	8.950	9.200	8.650	9.300	36.100
77	Brazil	Sandra Magalhaes	8.800	9.050	9.000	9.250	36.100
80	Greece	Maria Alevizou	9.150	9.000	8.850	9.000	36.000
81	Greece	Elena Kaitetzidou	8.800	8.950	9.100	8.900	35.750
82	Israel	Einat Argaman	8.900	9.150	8.600	9.000	35.650
82	United Kingdom	Lorraine Priest	8.950	9.350	8.700	8.650	35.650
84	New Zealand	Patria Hume	9.200	8.500	9.150	8.700	35.550
84	United Kingdom	Peta Machin	8.800	9.250	8.450	9.050	35.550
86	Australia	Nicole Higham	9.000	9.100	8.400	8.800	35.300
87	South Korea	In-Wha Kim	8.750	9.000	8.700	8.600	35.050
88	Turkey	Tuba Akincilar	8.650	8.800	8.800	8.750	35.000
88	Belgium	Laurence Brihaye	8.800	8.550	8.700	8.950	35.000
90	Greece	Dezi Tsakiri	8.450	8.850	8.650	8.700	34.650
91	Turkey	Sebnem Ozcakir	8.600	8.700	8.700	8.550	34.550
92	Belgium	Dominique Thiebaut	8.500	9.100	8.900	8.000	34.500
93	South Korea	Rhin Chae	8.250	7.950	8.700	8.800	33.700

=== Individual Rope ===
Place	Nation	Name	All Around	Rope	Total
1	Bulgaria	Diliana Guerguieva	10.000	10.000	20.000
2	Soviet Union	Marina Lobatch	9.900	10.000	19.900
3	Bulgaria	Lilia Ignatova	9.900	9.950	19.850
4	Soviet Union	Tatiana Druchinina	9.850	9.950	19.800
5	Spain	Marta Canton	9.800	9.850	19.650
5	East Germany	Bianca Dittrich	9.800	9.850	19.650
7	East Germany	Heide Krause	9.750	9.800	19.550
7	North Korea	Yenn Ran Kang	9.750	9.800	19.550

=== Individual Ball ===
Place	Nation	Name	All Around	Hoop	Total
1	Bulgaria	Diliana Guerguieva	9.950	10.000	19.950
1	Bulgaria	Lilia Ignatova	9.950	10.000	19.950
3	Soviet Union	Galina Beloglazova	9.900	10.000	19.900
3	East Germany	Bianca Dittrich	9.950	9.950	19.900
5	Soviet Union	Marina Lobatch	9.850	9.900	19.750
6	Romania	Florentina Butaru	9.800	9.850	19.650
7	East Germany	Heide Krause	9.800	9.800	19.600
8	Canada	Lori Fung	9.750	9.800	19.550

=== Individual Clubs ===
Place	Nation	Name	All Around	Clubs	Total
1	Bulgaria	Diliana Guerguieva	10.000	10.000	20.000
1	Bulgaria	Lilia Ignatova	10.000	10.000	20.000
3	Soviet Union	Tatiana Druchinina	9.950	9.950	19.900
4	Soviet Union	Galina Beloglazova	9.850	9.900	19.750
5	SFR Yugoslavia	Milena Reljin	9.800	9.800	19.600
6	Romania	Florentina Butaru	9.850	9.700	19.550
6	East Germany	Bianca Dittrich	9.800	9.750	19.550
6	Canada	Lori Fung	9.750	9.800	19.550

=== Individual Ribbon ===
Place	Nation	Name	All Around	Ribbon	Total
1	Soviet Union	Galina Beloglazova	10.000	10.000	20.000
1	Bulgaria	Bianka Panova	10.000	10.000	20.000
3	Bulgaria	Diliana Guerguieva	9.950	10.000	19.950
4	Soviet Union	Tatiana Druchinina	9.900	9.900	19.800
5	East Germany	Bianca Dittrich	9.950	9.800	19.750
6	Romania	Florentina Butaru	9.800	9.800	19.600
6	Hungary	Zsuzsa Turak	9.800	9.800	19.600
8	East Germany	Heide Krause	9.800	9.700	19.500

== Group ==
=== Preliminaries ===
Place	Nation	First Exercise	Second Exercise	Total
1	Bulgaria	19.750	19.850	39.600
2	USSR	19.700	19.850	39.550
3	North Korea	19.500	19.850	39.350
4	Spain	19.700	19.600	39.300
5	China	19.200	19.350	38.550
6	Japan	19.050	19.300	38.350
7	East Germany	18.950	19.200	38.150
8	Norway	18.850	19.100	37.950
9	Italy	18.850	19.000	37.850
9	West Germany	18.700	19.150	37.850
11	Finland	18.700	19.100	37.800
11	Austria	18.950	18.850	37.800
13	Canada	18.750	18.750	37.500
13	France	18.900	18.600	37.500
15	Hungary	18.500	18.900	37.400
16	The Netherlands	18.500	18.650	37.150
17	Sweden	18.350	18.400	36.750
18	USA	18.150	18.550	36.700
19	New Zealand	18.150	18.150	36.300
20	The United Kingdom	17.650	18.100	35.750
21	Brazil	17.900	17.050	34.950

=== Finals ===
Place	Nation	Average	Final	Total
1	Bulgaria	19.800	20.000	39.800
2	USSR	19.775	19.800	39.575
2	North Korea	19.675	19.900	39.575
4	China	19.275	19.450	38.725
5	East Germany	19.075	19.550	38.625
6	Japan	19.175	19.250	38.425
7	Spain	19.650	18.650	38.300
8	Norway	18.975	19.250	38.225
