= Rhythmic Gymnastics European Championships =

European championships for the sport of rhythmic gymnastics

- Status: active
- Genre: sporting event
- Date: mid-year
- Frequency: annual
- Country: varying
- Inaugurated: 1978

The Rhythmic Gymnastics European Championships are the European championships for the sport of rhythmic gymnastics. They were first held in 1978. The European Championships and the European Junior Championships were united in 1993. Prior to 2006, they were called the European Rhythmic Gymnastics Championships. The competition is organised by the European Union of Gymnastics.

== Editions ==
Seniors and Juniors:

Year	Edition		Host City	Host country	Events
Year	S	J	Host City	Host country	Events
1978	1	-	Madrid	Spain	5 + 0
1980	2	-	Amsterdam	Netherlands	6 + 0
1982	3	-	Stavanger	Norway	6 + 0
1984	4	-	Vienna	Austria	6 + 0
1986	5	-	Florence	Italy	6 + 0
1987	-	1	Athens	Greece	0 + 6
1988	6	-	Helsinki	Finland	8 + 0
1989	-	2	Tenerife	Spain	0 + 7
1990	7	-	Gothenburg	Sweden	9 + 0
1991	-	3	Lisbon	Portugal	0 + 7
1992	8	-	Stuttgart	Germany	9 + 0
1993	9	4	Bucharest	Romania	3 + 6
1994	10	5	Thessaloniki	Greece	7 + 1
1995	11	6	Prague	Czech Republic	3 + 6
1996	12	7	Asker	Norway	6 + 1
1997	13	8	Patras	Greece	8 + 1
1998	14	-	Porto	Portugal	6 + 0
1999	15	9	Budapest	Hungary	8 + 1
2000	16	-	Zaragoza	Spain	6 + 0
2001	17	10	Geneva	Switzerland	7 + 1
2002	18	-	Granada	Spain	2 + 0
2003	19	11	Riesa	Germany	7 + 1
2004	20	-	Kyiv	Ukraine	2 + 0
2005	21	12	Moscow	Russia	5 + 1
2006	22	13	Moscow	Russia	4 + 5
2007	23	14	Baku	Azerbaijan	5 + 1
2008	24	15	Turin	Italy	4 + 5
2009	25	16	Baku	Azerbaijan	5 + 1

Year	Edition		Host City	Host country	Events
Year	S	J	Host City	Host country	Events
2010	26	17	Bremen	Germany	4 + 5
2011	27	18	Minsk	Belarus	5 + 2
2012	28	19	Nizhny Novgorod	Russia	4 + 5
2013	29	20	Vienna	Austria	5 + 2
2014	30	21	Baku	Azerbaijan	4 + 5
2015	31	22	Minsk	Belarus	5 + 2
2016	32	23	Holon	Israel	4 + 5
2017	33	24	Budapest	Hungary	4.5 + 1.5
2018	34	25	Guadalajara	Spain	4.5 + 4.5
2019	35	26	Baku	Azerbaijan	4.5 + 3.5
2020	36	27	Kyiv	Ukraine	4.5 + 4.5
2021	37	28	Varna	Bulgaria	9 + 3
2022	38	29	Tel Aviv	Israel	9 + 5
2023	39	30	Baku	Azerbaijan	9 + 3
2024	40	31	Budapest	Hungary	9 + 5
2025	41	32	Tallinn	Estonia	9 + 3
2026	42	33	Varna	Bulgaria	9 + 5
2027	43	34	Pamplona	Spain	
2028	44	35	Orléans	France	

== Medalists ==
=== Team ===
Team All-Around Medalists
Year	Location	Gold	Silver	Bronze
1990	Gothenburg, Sweden	Soviet Union	Bulgaria	Spain
1992	Stuttgart, Germany	Bulgaria	Belarus	Russia; Spain
1994	Thessaloniki, Greece	Ukraine	Belarus	Bulgaria
1996	Asker, Norway	Ukraine	Belarus	Bulgaria
1998	Porto, Portugal	Belarus	Ukraine	Russia
2000	Zaragoza, Spain	Russia	Belarus	Germany
2002	Granada, Spain	Russia	Ukraine	Bulgaria
2004	Kyiv, Ukraine	Russia	Ukraine	Belarus
2005	Moscow, Russia	Russia	Ukraine	Belarus
2007	Baku, Azerbaijan	Russia	Ukraine	Azerbaijan
2009	Baku, Azerbaijan	Russia	Azerbaijan	Ukraine
2011	Minsk, Belarus	Russia	Belarus	Ukraine
2013	Vienna, Austria	Russia	Ukraine	Belarus
2015	Minsk, Belarus	Russia	Belarus	Ukraine
2017	Budapest, Hungary	Russia	Belarus	Bulgaria
2018	Guadalajara, Spain	Russia	Ukraine	Bulgaria
2019	Baku, Azerbaijan	Russia	Belarus	Bulgaria
2020	Kyiv, Ukraine	Ukraine	Israel	Azerbaijan
2021	Varna, Bulgaria	Russia	Belarus	Israel
2022	Tel Aviv, Israel	Bulgaria	Italy	Israel
2023	Baku, Azerbaijan	Bulgaria	Ukraine	Israel
2024	Budapest, Hungary	Bulgaria	Italy	Israel
2025	Tallinn, Estonia	Italy	Ukraine	Israel
2026	Varna, Bulgaria	Bulgaria	Israel	Russia

=== Senior Individual ===
==== Senior All-Around ====
Individual All-Around Medalists
Year	Location	Gold	Silver	Bronze
1978	Madrid, Spain	(Soviet Union) Galima Shugurova	(Soviet Union) Irina Deriugina	(Spain) Susana Mendizábal
1980	Amsterdam, Netherlands	(Bulgaria) Iliana Raeva	(Bulgaria) Lilia Ignatova	(Soviet Union) Inessa Lisovskaya
1982	Stavanger, Norway	(Soviet Union) Dalia Kutkaitė (Bulgaria) Anelia Ralenkova	None awarded	(Bulgaria) Iliana Raeva
1984	Vienna, Austria	(Soviet Union) Galina Beloglazova (Bulgaria) Anelia Ralenkova	None awarded	(Bulgaria) Diliana Georgieva
1986	Florence, Italy	(Bulgaria) Lilia Ignatova (Bulgaria) Bianka Panova	None awarded	(Soviet Union) Galina Beloglazova
1988	Helsinki, Finland	(Bulgaria) Adriana Dunavska (Bulgaria) Elizabeth Koleva (Soviet Union) Alexandra Timoshenko	None awarded	None awarded
1990	Gothenburg, Sweden	(Bulgaria) Julia Baicheva (Soviet Union) Alexandra Timoshenko	None awarded	(Soviet Union) Oksana Skaldina
1992	Stuttgart, Germany	(Bulgaria) Maria Petrova	(Ukraine) Alexandra Timoshenko	(Russia) Oksana Kostina
1994	Thessaloniki, Greece	(Bulgaria) Maria Petrova	(Ukraine) Olena Vitrychenko	(Russia) Amina Zaripova
1996	Asker, Norway	(Ukraine) Kateryna Serebrianska	(Russia) Yana Batyrshina	(Russia) Amina Zaripova
1997	Patras, Greece	(Ukraine) Olena Vitrychenko	(Belarus) Tatiana Ogrizko	(Ukraine) Kateryna Serebrianska
1998	Porto, Portugal	(Russia) Alina Kabaeva	(Belarus) Evgenia Pavlina	(Russia) Yana Batyrshina
1999	Budapest, Hungary	(Russia) Alina Kabaeva	(Belarus) Yulia Raskina	(France) Eva Serrano
2000	Zaragoza, Spain	(Russia) Alina Kabaeva	(Belarus) Yulia Raskina	(Russia) Yulia Barsoukova
2002	Granada, Spain	(Russia) Alina Kabaeva	(Ukraine) Tamara Yerofeeva	(Ukraine) Anna Bessonova
2004	Kyiv, Ukraine	(Russia) Alina Kabaeva	(Ukraine) Anna Bessonova	(Russia) Irina Tchachina
2006	Moscow, Russia	(Russia) Vera Sessina	(Russia) Alina Kabaeva	(Ukraine) Anna Bessonova
2008	Turin, Italy	(Russia) Evgeniya Kanaeva	(Ukraine) Anna Bessonova	(Russia) Olga Kapranova
2010	Bremen, Germany	(Russia) Evgeniya Kanaeva	(Russia) Daria Kondakova	(Azerbaijan) Aliya Garayeva
2012	Nizhny Novgorod, Russia	(Russia) Evgeniya Kanaeva	(Russia) Alexandra Merkulova	(Azerbaijan) Aliya Garayeva
2014	Baku, Azerbaijan	(Russia) Yana Kudryavtseva	(Belarus) Melitina Staniouta	(Ukraine) Ganna Rizatdinova
2016	Holon, Israel	(Russia) Yana Kudryavtseva	(Russia) Margarita Mamun	(Ukraine) Ganna Rizatdinova
2018	Guadalajara, Spain	(Russia) Arina Averina	(Russia) Dina Averina	(Belarus) Katsiaryna Halkina
2020	Kyiv, Ukraine	(Israel) Linoy Ashram	(Belarus) Alina Harnasko	(Belarus) Anastasiia Salos
2021	Varna, Bulgaria	(Russia) Arina Averina	(Bulgaria) Boryana Kaleyn	(Russia) Dina Averina
2022	Tel Aviv, Israel	(Israel) Daria Atamanov	(Bulgaria) Boryana Kaleyn	(Bulgaria) Stiliana Nikolova
2023	Baku, Azerbaijan	(Bulgaria) Boryana Kaleyn	(Italy) Sofia Raffaeli	(Bulgaria) Stiliana Nikolova
2024	Budapest, Hungary	(Bulgaria) Stiliana Nikolova	(Italy) Sofia Raffaeli	(Germany) Darja Varfolomeev
2025	Tallinn, Estonia	(Ukraine) Taisiia Onofriichuk	(Bulgaria) Stiliana Nikolova	(Germany) Darja Varfolomeev
2026	Varna, Bulgaria	(Germany) Darja Varfolomeev	(Bulgaria) Stiliana Nikolova	(Ukraine) Taisiia Onofriichuk

==== Rope ====
Individual Rope Medalists
Year	Location	Gold	Silver	Bronze
1978	Madrid, Spain	(Soviet Union) Galima Shugurova	(Soviet Union) Irina Deriugina	(Bulgaria) Christine Gurova
1980	Amsterdam, Netherlands	(Bulgaria) Iliana Raeva	(Soviet Union) Elena Tomas	(Czechoslovakia) Daniela Bošanská
1982	Stavanger, Norway	(Bulgaria) Anelia Ralenkova	(Soviet Union) Irina Devina (Bulgaria) Iliana Raeva	None awarded
1986	Florence, Italy	(Bulgaria) Lilia Ignatova (Bulgaria) Bianka Panova	None awarded	(Soviet Union) Marina Lobatch
1988	Helsinki, Finland	(Bulgaria) Elizabeth Koleva (Soviet Union) Marina Lobatch (Soviet Union) Alexandra Timoshenko	None awarded	None awarded
1990	Gothenburg, Sweden	(Soviet Union) Oksana Skaldina	(Soviet Union) Alexandra Timoshenko	(Bulgaria) Julia Baicheva (Bulgaria) Dimitrinka Todorova
1992	Stuttgart, Germany	(Ukraine) Oksana Skaldina	(Ukraine) Alexandra Timoshenko	(Bulgaria) Maria Petrova
1994	Thessaloniki, Greece	(Ukraine) Olena Vitrychenko	(Russia) Julia Rosliakova	(Bulgaria) Diana Popova
1996	Asker, Norway	(Ukraine) Kateryna Serebrianska	(Belarus) Tatiana Ogrizko	(Belarus) Larisa Lukyanenko (Bulgaria) Diana Popova (Ukraine) Olena Vitrychenko
1997	Patras, Greece	(Ukraine) Kateryna Serebrianska	(Russia) Yana Batyrshina (France) Eva Serrano	None awarded
1998	Porto, Portugal	(Russia) Yana Batyrshina	(Ukraine) Kateryna Serebrianska	(Ukraine) Olena Vitrychenko
1999	Budapest, Hungary	(Russia) Yulia Barsukova	(Ukraine) Olena Vitrychenko	(Russia) Alina Kabaeva
2000	Zaragoza, Spain	(Russia) Yulia Barsukova	(Ukraine) Tamara Yerofeeva	(Russia) Alina Kabaeva
2001	Geneva, Switzerland	(Russia) Irina Tchachina	(Russia) Alina Kabaeva	(Belarus) Elena Tkachenko
2005	Moscow, Russia	(Russia) Irina Tchachina	(Russia) Olga Kapranova	(Ukraine) Anna Bessonova
2007	Baku, Azerbaijan	(Azerbaijan) Aliya Garayeva	(Russia) Vera Sessina	(Russia) Olga Kapranova
2009	Baku, Azerbaijan	(Russia) Evgeniya Kanaeva	(Russia) Vera Sessina	(Ukraine) Anna Bessonova

==== Hoop ====
Individual Hoop Medalists
Year	Location	Gold	Silver	Bronze
1980	Amsterdam, Netherlands	(Bulgaria) Iliana Raeva	(Bulgaria) Lilia Ignatova	(West Germany) Carmen Rischer
1982	Stavanger, Norway	(Bulgaria) Anelia Ralenkova	(Soviet Union) Dalia Kutkaitė	(Soviet Union) Irina Devina (Bulgaria) Iliana Raeva
1984	Vienna, Austria	(Bulgaria) Lilia Ignatova (Bulgaria) Anelia Ralenkova	None awarded	(Soviet Union) Galina Beloglazova
1988	Helsinki, Finland	(Bulgaria) Adriana Dunavska (Bulgaria) Bianka Panova (Soviet Union) Alexandra Timoshenko	None awarded	None awarded
1990	Gothenburg, Sweden	(Soviet Union) Oksana Skaldina	(Bulgaria) Julia Baicheva (Soviet Union) Alexandra Timoshenko	None awarded
1992	Stuttgart, Germany	(Russia) Oksana Kostina (Belarus) Larisa Lukyanenko (Ukraine) Oksana Skaldina (Ukraine) Alexandra Timoshenko	None awarded	None awarded
1994	Thessaloniki, Greece	(Ukraine) Olena Vitrychenko	(Bulgaria) Maria Petrova	(Russia) Amina Zaripova
1997	Patras, Greece	(Ukraine) Olena Vitrychenko	(Belarus) Tatiana Ogrizko (Greece) Maria Pangalou	None awarded
1998	Porto, Portugal	(Ukraine) Kateryna Serebrianska	(Russia) Yana Batyrshina	(France) Eva Serrano
1999	Budapest, Hungary	(Russia) Alina Kabaeva	(Belarus) Yulia Raskina	(Russia) Yulia Barsukova
2000	Zaragoza, Spain	(Russia) Alina Kabaeva (France) Eva Serrano	None awarded	(Russia) Yulia Barsukova
2001	Geneva, Switzerland	(Russia) Alina Kabaeva	(Russia) Irina Tchachina	(Ukraine) Tamara Yerofeeva
2003	Riesa, Germany	(Ukraine) Anna Bessonova	(Russia) Zarina Gizikova	(Ukraine) Tamara Yerofeeva
2007	Baku, Azerbaijan	(Russia) Olga Kapranova	(Ukraine) Anna Bessonova	(Russia) Vera Sessina
2009	Baku, Azerbaijan	(Russia) Evgeniya Kanaeva	(Russia) Vera Sessina	(Ukraine) Anna Bessonova
2011	Minsk, Belarus	(Russia) Evgeniya Kanaeva	(Russia) Daria Kondakova	(Belarus) Liubov Charkashyna
2013	Vienna, Austria	(Russia) Daria Svatkovskaya	(Russia) Margarita Mamun	(Belarus) Melitina Staniouta
2015	Minsk, Belarus	(Russia) Margarita Mamun	(Belarus) Melitina Staniouta	(Belarus) Katsiaryna Halkina
2017	Budapest, Hungary	(Russia) Dina Averina	(Russia) Aleksandra Soldatova	(Israel) Linoy Ashram
2019	Baku, Azerbaijan	(Russia) Dina Averina	(Belarus) Katsiaryna Halkina	(Israel) Nicol Zelikman
2021	Varna, Bulgaria	(Russia) Dina Averina	(Israel) Linoy Ashram	(Belarus) Anastasiia Salos
2022	Tel Aviv, Israel	(Italy) Sofia Raffaeli	(Israel) Daria Atamanov	(Bulgaria) Boryana Kaleyn
2023	Baku, Azerbaijan	(Ukraine) Viktoriia Onopriienko	(Israel) Adi Asya Katz	(Bulgaria) Boryana Kaleyn
2024	Budapest, Hungary	(Bulgaria) Boryana Kaleyn	(Bulgaria) Stiliana Nikolova	(Ukraine) Taisiia Onofriichuk
2025	Tallinn, Estonia	(Bulgaria) Stiliana Nikolova	(Italy) Sofia Raffaeli	(Ukraine) Taisiia Onofriichuk
2026	Varna, Bulgaria	(Russia) Sofia Ilteriakova	(Belarus) Alina Harnasko	(Italy) Sofia Raffaeli

==== Ball ====
Individual Ball Medalists
Year	Location	Gold	Silver	Bronze
1978	Madrid, Spain	(Soviet Union) Irina Deriugina	(Soviet Union) Galima Shugurova	(Bulgaria) Christine Gurova
1984	Vienna, Austria	(Bulgaria) Anelia Ralenkova	(Soviet Union) Galina Beloglazova (Bulgaria) Lilia Ignatova (Soviet Union) Dalia Kutkaitė	None awarded
1986	Florence, Italy	(Soviet Union) Galina Beloglazova (Soviet Union) Tatiana Druchinina (Bulgaria) Adriana Dunavska	None awarded	None awarded
1990	Gothenburg, Sweden	(Soviet Union) Oksana Skaldina (Soviet Union) Alexandra Timoshenko	None awarded	(Bulgaria) Julia Baicheva (Romania) Irina Deleanu
1992	Stuttgart, Germany	(Russia) Oksana Kostina (Ukraine) Alexandra Timoshenko	None awarded	(Belarus) Larisa Lukyanenko (Bulgaria) Dimitrinka Todorova
1994	Thessaloniki, Greece	(Ukraine) Kateryna Serebrianska (Russia) Amina Zaripova	None awarded	(Belarus) Larisa Lukyanenko (Bulgaria) Maria Petrova
1996	Asker, Norway	(Ukraine) Kateryna Serebrianska	(Russia) Yana Batyrshina (Ukraine) Olena Vitrychenko	None awarded
1999	Budapest, Hungary	(Ukraine) Olena Vitrychenko	(Russia) Yulia Barsukova	(France) Eva Serrano
2000	Zaragoza, Spain	(Russia) Alina Kabaeva (Belarus) Yulia Raskina	None awarded	(Russia) Yulia Barsukova
2001	Geneva, Switzerland	(Russia) Alina Kabaeva	(Russia) Irina Tchachina	(Belarus) Elena Tkachenko
2003	Riesa, Germany	(Russia) Zarina Gizikova	(Ukraine) Anna Bessonova	(Belarus) Inna Zhukova
2005	Moscow, Russia	(Russia) Olga Kapranova	(Ukraine) Anna Bessonova	(Belarus) Inna Zhukova
2009	Baku, Azerbaijan	(Russia) Evgeniya Kanaeva	(Ukraine) Anna Bessonova	(Azerbaijan) Anna Gurbanova
2011	Minsk, Belarus	(Belarus) Liubov Charkashyna	(Russia) Evgeniya Kanaeva	(Russia) Darya Dmitriyeva
2013	Vienna, Austria	(Russia) Yana Kudryavtseva	(Russia) Margarita Mamun	(Bulgaria) Silvia Miteva
2015	Minsk, Belarus	(Russia) Yana Kudryavtseva	(Russia) Margarita Mamun	(Belarus) Melitina Staniouta
2017	Budapest, Hungary	(Russia) Arina Averina	(Russia) Aleksandra Soldatova	(Belarus) Alina Harnasko
2019	Baku, Azerbaijan	(Russia) Arina Averina	(Russia) Aleksandra Soldatova	(Bulgaria) Boryana Kaleyn
2021	Varna, Bulgaria	(Russia) Dina Averina	(Israel) Linoy Ashram	(Belarus) Alina Harnasko
2022	Tel Aviv, Israel	(Bulgaria) Boryana Kaleyn	(Italy) Sofia Raffaeli	(Germany) Darja Varfolomeev
2023	Baku, Azerbaijan	(Italy) Sofia Raffaeli	(Bulgaria) Stiliana Nikolova	(Azerbaijan) Zohra Aghamirova
2024	Budapest, Hungary	(Italy) Sofia Raffaeli	(Hungary) Fanni Pigniczki	(Israel) Daniela Munits
2025	Tallinn, Estonia	(Bulgaria) Stiliana Nikolova	(Germany) Anastasia Simakova	(Israel) Meital Maayan Sumkin
2026	Varna, Bulgaria	(Germany) Darja Varfolomeev	(Bulgaria) Stiliana Nikolova	(Russia) Sofia Ilteriakova

==== Clubs ====
Individual Clubs Medalists
Year	Location	Gold	Silver	Bronze
1980	Amsterdam, Netherlands	(Bulgaria) Lilia Ignatova (Bulgaria) Iliana Raeva	None awarded	(Soviet Union) Inessa Lisovskaya
1982	Stavanger, Norway	(Soviet Union) Dalia Kutkaitė	(Bulgaria) Anelia Ralenkova	(Soviet Union) Irina Devina (Bulgaria) Iliana Raeva
1984	Vienna, Austria	(Bulgaria) Diliana Georgieva (Bulgaria) Anelia Ralenkova	None awarded	(Soviet Union) Galina Beloglazova (Soviet Union) Dalia Kutkaitė
1986	Florence, Italy	(Bulgaria) Lilia Ignatova (Bulgaria) Bianka Panova	None awarded	(Soviet Union) Galina Beloglazova
1988	Helsinki, Finland	(Bulgaria) Adriana Dunavska (Soviet Union) Alexandra Timoshenko	None awarded	(Bulgaria) Elizabeth Koleva (Soviet Union) Marina Lobatch
1992	Stuttgart, Germany	(Russia) Oksana Kostina (Ukraine) Oksana Skaldina (Ukraine) Alexandra Timoshenko	None awarded	None awarded
1994	Thessaloniki, Greece	(Belarus) Larisa Lukyanenko (Russia) Amina Zaripova	None awarded	(Ukraine) Kateryna Serebrianska
1996	Asker, Norway	(Russia) Amina Zaripova	(Ukraine) Kateryna Serebrianska	(Russia) Natalia Lipkovskaya (Ukraine) Olena Vitrychenko
1997	Patras, Greece	(Russia) Natalia Lipkovskaya	(Russia) Yana Batyrshina (Belarus) Tatiana Ogrizko (Ukraine) Kateryna Serebrianska	None awarded
1998	Porto, Portugal	(Ukraine) Olena Vitrychenko	(France) Eva Serrano	(Belarus) Yulia Raskina
2001	Geneva, Switzerland	(Russia) Alina Kabaeva	(Russia) Irina Tchachina	(Ukraine) Tamara Yerofeeva
2003	Riesa, Germany	(Ukraine) Anna Bessonova	(Ukraine) Tamara Yerofeeva	(Bulgaria) Simona Peycheva
2005	Moscow, Russia	(Russia) Irina Tchachina	(Russia) Olga Kapranova	(Ukraine) Anna Bessonova
2007	Baku, Azerbaijan	(Russia) Vera Sessina	(Russia) Olga Kapranova	(Ukraine) Anna Bessonova
2011	Minsk, Belarus	(Belarus) Liubov Charkashyna	(Israel) Neta Rivkin	(Ukraine) Alina Maskymenko
2013	Vienna, Austria	(Russia) Yana Kudryavtseva	(Russia) Margarita Mamun	(Belarus) Melitina Staniouta
2015	Minsk, Belarus	(Russia) Yana Kudryavtseva	(Ukraine) Ganna Rizatdinova	(Belarus) Katsiaryna Halkina (Belarus) Melitina Staniouta
2017	Budapest, Hungary	(Russia) Arina Averina	(Russia) Dina Averina	(Israel) Linoy Ashram
2019	Baku, Azerbaijan	(Russia) Arina Averina	(Russia) Dina Averina	(Ukraine) Vlada Nikolchenko
2021	Varna, Bulgaria	(Israel) Linoy Ashram	(Russia) Dina Averina	(Belarus) Anastasiia Salos
2022	Tel Aviv, Israel	(Italy) Sofia Raffaeli	(Israel) Daria Atamanov	(Germany) Darja Varfolomeev
2023	Baku, Azerbaijan	(Italy) Sofia Raffaeli	(Bulgaria) Boryana Kaleyn	(Slovenia) Ekaterina Vedeneeva
2024	Budapest, Hungary	(Israel) Daniela Munits	(Poland) Liliana Lewińska	(Bulgaria) Boryana Kaleyn
2025	Tallinn, Estonia	(Bulgaria) Stiliana Nikolova	(Ukraine) Taisiia Onofriichuk	(Italy) Sofia Raffaeli
2026	Varna, Bulgaria	(Bulgaria) Stiliana Nikolova	(Russia) Maria Borisova	(Israel) Daniela Munits

==== Ribbon ====
Individual Ribbon Medalists
Year	Location	Gold	Silver	Bronze
1978	Madrid, Spain	(Soviet Union) Galima Shugurova	(Czechoslovakia) Daniela Bošanská (Soviet Union) Irina Deriugina	None awarded
1980	Amsterdam, Netherlands	(Bulgaria) Lilia Ignatova	(Bulgaria) Iliana Raeva	(Soviet Union) Inessa Lisovskaya
1982	Stavanger, Norway	(Bulgaria) Lilia Ignatova (Soviet Union) Dalia Kutkaitė	None awarded	(Bulgaria) Iliana Raeva
1984	Vienna, Austria	(Soviet Union) Galina Beloglazova (Bulgaria) Diliana Georgieva	None awarded	(Bulgaria) Anelia Ralenkova
1986	Florence, Italy	(Soviet Union) Galina Beloglazova	(Bulgaria) Lilia Ignatova (Bulgaria) Bianka Panova	None awarded
1988	Helsinki, Finland	(Bulgaria) Adriana Dunavska (Soviet Union) Marina Lobatch (Bulgaria) Bianka Panova	None awarded	None awarded
1990	Gothenburg, Sweden	(Soviet Union) Oksana Skaldina	(Bulgaria) Julia Baicheva	(Bulgaria) Dimitrinka Todorova
1994	Thessaloniki, Greece	(Ukraine) Kateryna Serebrianska (Ukraine) Olena Vitrychenko	None awarded	(Russia) Amina Zaripova
1996	Asker, Norway	(Ukraine) Kateryna Serebrianska	(Belarus) Larisa Lukyanenko	(Belarus) Tatiana Ogrizko (Bulgaria) Diana Popova
1997	Patras, Greece	(Russia) Yana Batyrshina	(Greece) Maria Pangalou (Ukraine) Kateryna Serebrianska (France) Eva Serrano (Ukraine) Olena Vitrychenko	None awarded
1998	Porto, Portugal	(Belarus) Evgenia Pavlina	(Russia) Yana Batyrshina	(Ukraine) Kateryna Serebrianska
1999	Budapest, Hungary	(Ukraine) Olena Vitrychenko	(Russia) Alina Kabaeva	(Belarus) Yulia Raskina
2000	Zaragoza, Spain	(Russia) Alina Kabaeva	(France) Eva Serrano	(Belarus) Yulia Raskina
2003	Riesa, Germany	(Ukraine) Anna Bessonova	(Belarus) Inna Zhukova	(Ukraine) Tamara Yerofeeva
2005	Moscow, Russia	(Ukraine) Natalia Godunko	(Ukraine) Anna Bessonova	(Belarus) Inna Zhukova
2007	Baku, Azerbaijan	(Russia) Evgeniya Kanaeva	(Ukraine) Anna Bessonova	(Russia) Vera Sessina
2009	Baku, Azerbaijan	(Russia) Evgeniya Kanaeva	(Russia) Vera Sessina	(Ukraine) Anna Bessonova
2011	Minsk, Belarus	(Russia) Evgeniya Kanaeva	(Russia) Daria Kondakova	(Bulgaria) Silvia Miteva
2013	Vienna, Austria	(Russia) Margarita Mamun	(Ukraine) Ganna Rizatdinova	(Bulgaria) Silvia Miteva
2015	Minsk, Belarus	(Russia) Yana Kudryavtseva	(Belarus) Melitina Staniouta	(Azerbaijan) Marina Durunda
2017	Budapest, Hungary	(Russia) Dina Averina	(Bulgaria) Katrin Taseva	(Bulgaria) Neviana Vladinova
2019	Baku, Azerbaijan	(Russia) Dina Averina	(Russia) Aleksandra Soldatova	(Bulgaria) Boryana Kaleyn
2021	Varna, Bulgaria	(Russia) Dina Averina	(Belarus) Alina Harnasko	(Russia) Arina Averina
2022	Tel Aviv, Israel	(Bulgaria) Boryana Kaleyn	(Israel) Daria Atamanov	(Israel) Adi Asya Katz
2023	Baku, Azerbaijan	(Germany) Darja Varfolomeev	(Bulgaria) Eva Brezalieva	(Bulgaria) Stiliana Nikolova
2024	Budapest, Hungary	(Germany) Darja Varfolomeev	(Italy) Sofia Raffaeli	(Bulgaria) Elvira Krasnobaeva
2025	Tallinn, Estonia	(Germany) Darja Varfolomeev	(Israel) Meital Maayan Sumkin	(Ukraine) Taisiia Onofriichuk
2026	Varna, Bulgaria	(Germany) Darja Varfolomeev	(Bulgaria) Stiliana Nikolova	(Russia) Maria Borisova

=== Senior Groups ===
==== All-Around ====
Group All-Around Medalists
Year	Location	Gold	Silver	Bronze
1978	Madrid, Spain	Bulgaria	Soviet Union	Czechoslovakia
1980	Amsterdam, Netherlands	Bulgaria	Soviet Union	Czechoslovakia
1982	Stavanger, Norway	Soviet Union	Bulgaria	Czechoslovakia
1984	Vienna, Austria	Bulgaria	Soviet Union	Spain
1986	Florence, Italy	Bulgaria	Soviet Union	Spain
1988	Helsinki, Finland	Bulgaria	Soviet Union	Hungary
1990	Gothenburg, Sweden	Bulgaria	Soviet Union	Spain
1992	Stuttgart, Germany	Russia; Spain	None awarded	Hungary
1993	Bucharest, Romania	Russia	Bulgaria	Spain
1995	Prague, Czech Republic	Russia	Bulgaria	Spain
1997	Patras, Greece	Russia	Greece	Ukraine
1999	Budapest, Hungary	Greece	Russia	Belarus
2001	Geneva, Switzerland	Russia	Greece	Belarus
2003	Riesa, Germany	Russia	Bulgaria	Italy
2006	Moscow, Russia	Russia	Italy	Belarus
2008	Turin, Italy	Russia	Belarus	Italy
2010	Bremen, Germany	Russia	Italy	Belarus
2012	Nizhny Novgorod, Russia	Russia	Belarus	Italy
2014	Baku, Azerbaijan	Russia	Italy	Israel
2016	Holon, Israel	Russia	Belarus	Israel
2018	Guadalajara, Spain	Russia	Italy	Bulgaria
2020	Kyiv, Ukraine	Israel	Azerbaijan	Ukraine
2021	Varna, Bulgaria	Russia	Italy	Israel
2022	Tel Aviv, Israel	Israel	Italy	Azerbaijan
2023	Baku, Azerbaijan	Bulgaria	Israel	Azerbaijan
2024	Budapest, Hungary	Bulgaria	Italy	Spain
2025	Tallinn, Estonia	Spain	Israel	Hungary
2026	Varna, Bulgaria	Spain	Russia	Israel

==== Single apparatus ====
Group Single Apparatus Medalists
Year	Location	Gold	Silver	Bronze
1988	Helsinki, Finland	Bulgaria	Soviet Union	Spain
1990	Gothenburg, Sweden	Bulgaria	Spain	Italy; Soviet Union
1992	Stuttgart, Germany	Russia	Bulgaria	Spain
1993	Bucharest, Romania	Russia	Bulgaria	Hungary; Romania
1995	Prague, Czech Republic	Russia	Bulgaria	Spain
1997	Patras, Greece	Russia	Spain; Ukraine	None awarded
1999	Budapest, Hungary	Greece	Russia	Belarus
2001	Geneva, Switzerland	Russia	Ukraine	Greece
2003	Riesa, Germany	Russia	Bulgaria	Belarus
2006	Moscow, Russia	Russia	Belarus	Italy
2008	Turin, Italy	Italy	Belarus	Bulgaria
2010	Bremen, Germany	Russia	Belarus	Italy
2012	Nizhny Novgorod, Russia	Russia	Belarus	Bulgaria
2014	Baku, Azerbaijan	Bulgaria	Russia	Spain
2016	Holon, Israel	Belarus	Israel	Spain
2018	Guadalajara, Spain	Italy	Ukraine	Russia
2020	Kyiv, Ukraine	Ukraine	Israel	Estonia
2021	Varna, Bulgaria	Bulgaria	Russia	Israel
2022	Tel Aviv, Israel	Italy	Israel	Azerbaijan
2023	Baku, Azerbaijan	Israel	Bulgaria	Italy
2024	Budapest, Hungary	Italy	Spain	Israel
2025	Tallinn, Estonia	Spain	France	Italy
2026	Varna, Bulgaria	Spain	Belarus	Israel

==== Mixed apparatus ====
Group Mixed Apparatus Medalists
Year	Location	Gold	Silver	Bronze
1988	Helsinki, Finland	Bulgaria; Soviet Union	None awarded	Italy
1990	Gothenburg, Sweden	Bulgaria; Soviet Union	None awarded	Spain
1992	Stuttgart, Germany	Spain	Russia	Ukraine
1993	Bucharest, Romania	Bulgaria; Russia	None awarded	Spain
1995	Prague, Czech Republic	Bulgaria	Spain	France
1997	Patras, Greece	Belarus	Bulgaria	Spain
1999	Budapest, Hungary	Greece	Russia	Spain
2001	Geneva, Switzerland	Belarus	Greece	Bulgaria
2003	Riesa, Germany	Bulgaria	Greece	Italy
2006	Moscow, Russia	Russia	Italy	Bulgaria
2008	Turin, Italy	Russia	Italy	Belarus
2010	Bremen, Germany	Russia	Italy	Belarus
2012	Nizhny Novgorod, Russia	Belarus	Bulgaria	Italy
2014	Baku, Azerbaijan	Russia	Azerbaijan	Bulgaria
2016	Holon, Israel	Israel	Spain	Bulgaria
2018	Guadalajara, Spain	Bulgaria	Italy	Azerbaijan
2020	Kyiv, Ukraine	Turkey	Ukraine	Azerbaijan
2021	Varna, Bulgaria	Israel	Bulgaria	Italy
2022	Tel Aviv, Israel	Italy	Spain	Azerbaijan
2023	Baku, Azerbaijan	Azerbaijan	Israel	Spain
2024	Budapest, Hungary	Spain	Israel	Ukraine
2025	Tallinn, Estonia	Spain	Ukraine	Germany
2026	Varna, Bulgaria	Spain	Russia	Israel

== All-time medal table (senior events only) ==
Last updated after the 2026 European Championships.

Rank	Nation	Gold	Silver	Bronze	Total
1	Russia	106	49	27	182
2	Bulgaria	67	35	46	148
3	Ukraine	32	38	33	103
4	Soviet Union	28	18	14	60
5	Belarus	11	34	36	81
6	Italy	11	18	14	43
7	Israel	9	17	20	46
8	Spain	9	6	19	34
9	Germany	6	1	6	13
10	Greece	3	6	1	10
11	Azerbaijan	2	3	13	18
12	France	1	5	4	10
13	Turkey	1	0	0	1
14	Czechoslovakia	0	1	4	5
14	Hungary	0	1	4	5
16	Poland	0	1	0	1
17	Romania	0	0	2	2
18	Estonia	0	0	1	1
18	Slovenia	0	0	1	1
18	West Germany	0	0	1	1
Totals (20 entries)		286	233	246	765

== Multiple gold medalists ==
Boldface denotes active rhythmic gymnasts and highest medal count among all rhythmic gymnasts (including these who not included in these tables) per type.

=== All events ===
Rank	Rhythmic gymnast	Country	From	To	Gold	Silver	Bronze	Total
1	Alina Kabaeva	Russia	1998	2006	**15**	3	3	21
2	Evgeniya Kanaeva	Russia	2007	2012	13	1	–	14
3	Olena Vitrychenko	Ukraine	1992	1999	10	5	4	19
4	Kateryna Serebrianska	Ukraine	1994	1998	10	5	3	18
5	Dina Averina	Russia	2017	2021	10	4	1	15
6	Alexandra Timoshenko	Soviet Union; Ukraine	1988	1992	10	4	–	14
7	**Stiliana Nikolova**	Bulgaria	2022	2026	9	6	3	18
8	Arina Averina	Russia	2017	2021	9	–	1	10
9	Yana Kudryavtseva	Russia	2013	2016	9	–	–	9
10	Oksana Skaldina	Soviet Union; Ukraine	1990	1992	8	–	1	9

=== Individual events ===
Rank	Rhythmic gymnast	Country	From	To	Gold	Silver	Bronze	Total
1	Alina Kabaeva	Russia	1998	2006	**12**	3	2	17
2	Evgeniya Kanaeva	Russia	2007	2012	10	1	–	11
3	Alexandra Timoshenko	Soviet Union; Ukraine	1988	1992	9	4	–	13
4	Kateryna Serebrianska	Ukraine	1994	1998	8	4	3	15
4	Olena Vitrychenko	Ukraine	1994	1999	8	4	3	15
6	Dina Averina	Russia	2017	2021	7	4	1	12
7	Lilia Ignatova	Bulgaria	1980	1986	7	4	–	11
8	Anelia Ralenkova	Bulgaria	1982	1984	7	1	1	9
9	Oksana Skaldina	Soviet Union; Ukraine	1990	1992	7	–	1	8
10	Yana Kudryavtseva	Russia	2013	2016	7	–	–	7

=== Records ===
Category	All events	Individual events
Most medals	(Ukraine) Anna Bessonova : 24 medals (3 gold, 12 silver and 9 bronze)	(Ukraine) Anna Bessonova : 19 medals (3 gold, 8 silver and 8 bronze)

== Junior European Championships ==
The Junior European Championships in rhythmic gymnastics were first held for the first time in 1987. Prior to 1993, they were held as a separate event. Since the 1993 edition in Bucharest, Romania, the Junior European Championships were integrated to the senior European Championships.

== See also ==
- Rhythmic Gymnastics European Cup
- Rhythmic Gymnastics World Championships
- African Rhythmic Gymnastics Championships
- Asian Rhythmic Gymnastics Championships
- Pan American Rhythmic Gymnastics Championships
- South Central Asian Gymnastics Championships
- South American Gymnastics Championships
- Rheintalcup
- World Gymnaestrada
- Pacific Rim Championships
- Arab Gymnastics Championships
