= Bianka Panova =

Bulgarian rhythmic gymnast

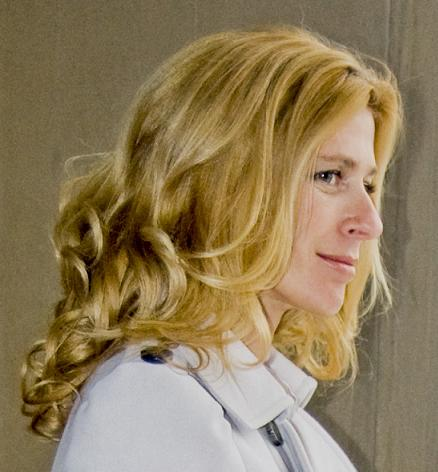

Personal information
- Born: May 27, 1970 (age 56) Sofia

Gymnastics career
- Discipline: Rhythmic gymnastics
- Country represented: Bulgaria
- Club: Levski and Slavia
- Head coach: Neshka Robeva
- Assistant coach: Liudmila Dimitrova
Medal record
Representing Bulgaria
Rhythmic Gymnastics
World Championships
Gold medal – first place	1985 Valladolid	Ribbon
Gold medal – first place	1987 Varna	All-around
Gold medal – first place	1987 Varna	Rope
Gold medal – first place	1987 Varna	Hoop
Gold medal – first place	1987 Varna	Clubs
Gold medal – first place	1987 Varna	Ribbon
Gold medal – first place	1989 Sarajevo	Rope
Gold medal – first place	1989 Sarajevo	Hoop
Gold medal – first place	1989 Sarajevo	Team
Silver medal – second place	1989 Sarajevo	All-around
Silver medal – second place	1989 Sarajevo	Ball
Bronze medal – third place	1985 Valladolid	All-around
European Championships
Gold medal – first place	1986 Florence	All-around
Gold medal – first place	1986 Florence	Rope
Gold medal – first place	1986 Florence	Clubs
Gold medal – first place	1988 Helsinki	Hoop
Gold medal – first place	1988 Helsinki	Ribbon
Silver medal – second place	1986 Florence	Ribbon
World Cup Final
Gold medal – first place	1986 Tokyo	Ribbon
Gold medal – first place	1986 Tokyo	Ball
Bronze medal – third place	1986 Tokyo	Rope
Bronze medal – third place	1986 Tokyo	Clubs

Bianka Panova (Bulgarian: Бианка Панова, born May 27, 1970, in Sofia) is a Bulgarian individual rhythmic gymnast. She is a World and European champion and was one of the Golden Girls of Bulgaria that dominated rhythmic gymnastics in the 1980s. She is the 1987 World all-around champion, 1989 World all-around silver medalist, 1985 World all-around bronze medallist and 1986 European all-around champion. Panova won a total of nine World Championship gold medals. She now works as a rhythmic gymnastics coach.

== Personal life ==
Panova was born on May 27, 1970, in Sofia, Bulgaria. She lived in Belgium with her husband, physiotherapist and physician, Tchavdar Ninov, and their two sons, Stefan and Richard, before moving to Singapore in 2015 to establish a rhythmic gymnastics academy named after her, the Bianka Panova Academy. In 2009, Panova was invited to compete in the Bulgarian edition of Dancing with the Stars and won with the highest public vote.

In 2013, Panova published an autobiography in which she criticized the treatment of gymnasts during the time period of her training.

== Gymnastics career ==
Panova began gymnastics at age 8 and joined the Bulgarian national team when she 14. She won the Bulgarian national title three times.

At the age of 15, Panova won her first World gold medal at the 1985 World Championships in ribbon. Between 1985 and 1989, she won nine golds, two silvers, and one bronze at the World Championships, including a sweep of all five golds at the 1987 Worlds Championships.

Panova competed at the 1988 Seoul Olympics as the reigning World champion. However, she made a mistake in the preliminary round, dropping a club, and finished in fourth place behind gold medalist Marina Lobatch (USSR), Bulgarian teammate Adriana Dunavska, and Olexandra Tymoshenko (USSR).

For this mistake, she was removed from the national team, and she began training for the 1989 World Championships on her own, with some help from her future husband. She went on to win silver in the all-around and with ball, and gold in the hoop and rope finals, though her results did not resolve the conflict with her coaching team.

Panova retired from competition in 1989 and became a coach in Italy. She tried to make a comeback in 1992 but failed to make the Bulgarian Olympic team.

== Coaching career ==
After her initial retirement in 1989, Panova coached the Italian national champion, Katia Pietrosanti, who is the 1993 European Junior silver medalist in clubs.

She returned to coaching in 1993, this time in Belgium. She concentrated on artistic gymnastics and acrobatics choreography. Until 2001, she was the head coach at the Happy Gym club in Ghent. Among her students was Dutch national champion in rhythmic gymnastics Elke De Backer. She also introduced her own method of flexibility conditioning for non-gymnast athletes.

In 2015, she established a rhythmic gymnastics school in Singapore after being invited to the country by co-founder Daniela Michaely. By 2017, her eponymous Bianka Panova Academy had 100 students enrolled. In 2022, the academy co-founded the Singapore International Rhythmic Gymnastics Cup, which was renamed the Bianka Panova International Cup in its second year.

== Achievements ==
Panova is the first rhythmic gymnast to get a clean sweep of all five (all-around, ribbon, clubs, hoop, rope) gold medals at a World Championship. The only other gymnasts to win all the individual medals at a single World Championship are Oxana Kostina, Evgenia Kanaeva, and Darja Varfolomeev. Panova also became the first rhythmic gymnast to enter the Guinness Book of Records by receiving perfect 10 marks in all her routines (a total of 8) at a World Championship. She achieved this at the 1987 World Championships in Varna and received the trophy personally from the president of the IOC at that time, Juan Antonio Samaranch.
