= Milena Reljin =

Yugoslav rhythmic gymnast

- Born: 25 May 1967 (age 59) Belgrade, SR Serbia, SFR Yugoslavia

Gymnastics career
- Discipline: Rhythmic gymnastics
- Country represented: Yugoslavia
- Retired: 1989

Milena Reljin (Serbian Cyrillic: Милена Рељин, born 25 May 1967 in Belgrade, SR Serbia, Yugoslavia) is a Serbian rhythmic gymnast. She is the child of Mita Reljin, a basketball player and coach, and Vukosava Milanović-Reljin, a basketball player for Radnički and later, Partizan. During her career Reljin won a record 9 consecutive Yugoslav Senior National Titles, from 1981 to 1989.

She began with rhythmic gymnastics in 1977 at age 9, after a primary school friend, named Mira, did the same. At the time Milena was doing folk dancing but, she became enchanted with rhythmic gymnastics after watching one of her friend's training sessions. Milena's first coach was Olivera Radosavljević at the Senjak Gymnastics Club. Olivera's daughter Jasna Tomin later took over younger gymnasts, including Milena. Her next coach was Nada Vučković-Pisić at the Gymnastics Club Partizan.

In 1980, Reljin won the Yugoslav Junior National Championships, followed by a string of Senior championships that would last until 1989. In 1981, she took the all-around gold at the Balkan championships and tied Bulgarian Anelia Ralenkova for silver on clubs. She competed twice at Olympic Games Los Angeles 1984 where she came 5th All-Around, and Seoul 1988 where she placed 9th All-Around. Milena retired from the sport in 1989.

After her retirement she took up coaching at her old club Partizan, where she coached from 1990 until 2002. In 2002, she started her own Rhythmic Gymnastics Club, Ritam, which she is now the head coach for around 400 girls aged 4 to 20.

Reljin has also been an international judge at five World, seven European Championships and Olympic Games 2016, as well as other international tournaments.

From 2005 to 2012 she was President of Women and sport Commission in Olympic Committee of Serbia.

From 2005 to 2009 she was Vice President of Serbian Anti-Doping Agency.

In 2006 for successful work and achievements in sport she was awarded by Ministry for education and sports of Republic of Serbia with "Award of Saint Sava".

She was representative of Olympic Committee of Serbia at IOC Women and sport Congress in 2011.

Since 2009 she is National RG Team Head Coach, President of Technical Committee for Rhythmic Gymnastic and board member of Gymnastics Federation of Serbia

Since 2014 she is member of Sport Commission in Olympic Committee of Serbia.

She is married to Nenad Tatić and has 3 children.
