= Marina Lobatch =

Soviet gymnast

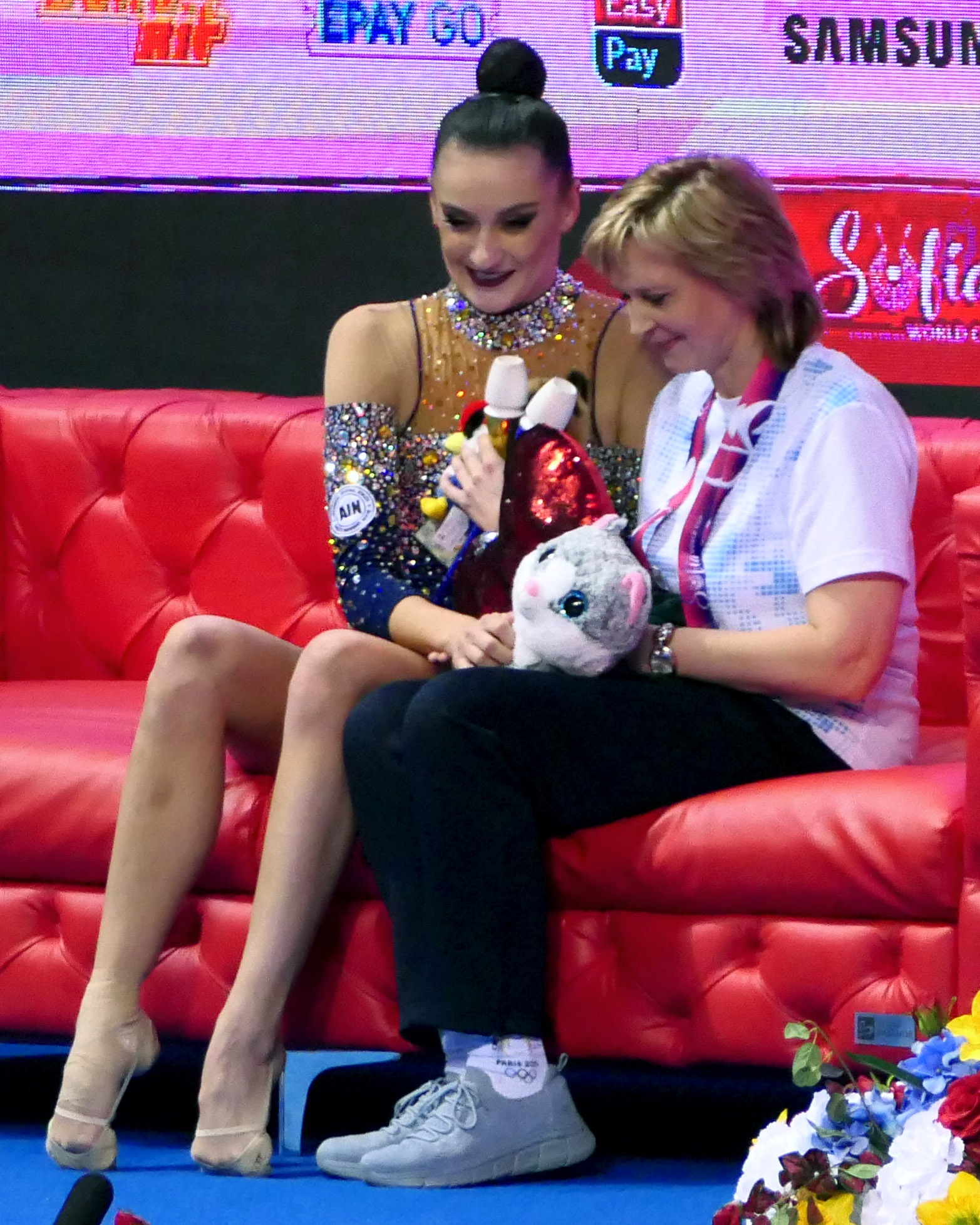
- Lobatch with her student Alina Harnasko in 2024

Personal information
- Full name: Marina Vikentyevna Lobatch
- Born: 26 June 1970 (age 56) Smalyavichy, Byelorussian SSR, Soviet Union (now Belarus)
- Spouse: Dmitry Bogdanov

Gymnastics career
- Discipline: Rhythmic gymnastics
- Country represented: Soviet Union
- Head coaches: Galina Krylenko, Irina Leparskaya
- Retired: 1989
Medal record
Rhythmic gymnastics
Representing Soviet Union
Olympic Games
Gold medal – first place	1988 Seoul	All-around
World Championships
Gold medal – first place	1987 Varna	Hoop
Silver medal – second place	1985 Valladolid	Rope
Bronze medal – third place	1987 Varna	Rope
Bronze medal – third place	1987 Varna	Clubs
European Championships
Gold medal – first place	1988 Helsinki	Rope
Gold medal – first place	1988 Helsinki	Ribbon
Bronze medal – third place	1986 Florence	Rope
Bronze medal – third place	1988 Helsinki	Clubs
World Cup Final
Silver medal – second place	1986 Tokyo	Rope

Marina Vikentyevna Lobatch (Belarusian: Марына Вікенцьеўна Лобач, Russian: Марина Викентьевна Лобач; born 26 June 1970) is a former Soviet individual rhythmic gymnast. She is the 1988 Olympic champion, 1987 world gold medalist in hoop and 1988 European gold medalist in rope and ribbon.

== Career ==
Lobatch started the sport in 1977 at age 7. Lobatch was among the leading Soviet gymnasts of the 1980s (along with Tatiana Druchinina, Galina Beloglazova, and Dalia Kutkaitė). She won gold in the hoop competition, and bronze in the rope and clubs competitions, during the 1987 World Championships. However, in the all-around event she finished behind three Bulgarian gymnasts who won gold and tied silver, leaving her in fourth tied with teammate Anna Kotchneva. In 1988, Lobatch finished 4th at the European Championships, but won gold in the rope (tied with two others) and ribbon competitions, and bronze in the clubs competition.

Her biggest success was during the 1988 Seoul Olympics. She received perfect tens on all of her routines during the qualifying and final rounds of the all-around competition. Her closest competitors also received perfect scores during the finals, but had not received perfect scores in the qualifying round (as a tie-breaker the qualifying scores were divided by two and added onto the final round scores). The final scores were very close, with Lobatch receiving 60.000, Adriana Dunavska receiving 59.950, and Olexandra Tymoshenko receiving 59.875.

Until the Paris Olympics 2024 Lobatch was the youngest Olympic Champion in rhythmic gymnastics at 18 years, 3 months and 6 days where she was beat by German gymnast Darja Varfolomeev who was 17 years, 9 months and 5 days at the time of her win. She was never crowned European or World All-around Champion. She retired in 1989 at the age of 19.

In 1993, Lobatch went to Lamezia Terme, Italy to prepare gymnasts Larissa Lukyanenko and Tatiana Ogrizko for the Italia Serie A. During training they competed for the local club Gascal in the Serie A. Lobatch returned to Belarus in April 1994. In 1998 she was invited to Italy by the Gascal club, where she spent several weeks with her family.

Lobatch is a coach and judge for the Belarusian Gymnastics Federation. She has been awarded the Order of Friendship of Peoples. She is coaching Alina Harnasko (2020 European All-around silver medalist).

== Detailed Olympic results ==
Year	Competition description	Location	Music	Apparatus	Score-Final
1988	Olympics	Seoul		All-around	60.000
1988	Olympics	Seoul		Prelim	20.000
1988	Olympics	Seoul	?	Rope	10.000
1988	Olympics	Seoul	Passacaglia in G minor by Georg Frideric Handel	Hoop	10.000
1988	Olympics	Seoul	Rhapsody on a Theme of Paganini by Sergei Rachmaninoff	Clubs	10.000
1988	Olympics	Seoul	Theme from Swan Lake by Pyotr Tchaikovsky	Ribbon	10.000

== Personal life ==
She currently lives in Minsk with her husband, Dmitry Bogdanov, and their daughters, Irina and Nadya.
