= Golden Girls of Bulgaria =

The "Golden Girls" of Bulgaria (Bulgarian: Златните момичета на България) refers to Bulgarian rhythmic gymnasts and particularly those who represented Bulgaria from 1976 to 1999, when the team was coached by Neshka Robeva. In this period, the Golden Girls won 14 Rhythmic Gymnastics World Championships all-around titles in individual and ensemble performances, 14 Rhythmic Gymnastics European Championships all-around titles, and an assortment of other World and European titles. These gymnasts were seen as symbols of Bulgaria due to their international success. The term is sometimes also used to refer to current Bulgarian rhythmic gymnasts, especially the national group.

The most prominent gymnasts of the Golden Girls are Adriana Dunavska, Anelia Ralenkova, Bianka Panova, Diliana Georgieva, Elizabeth Koleva, Iliana Raeva, Julia Baicheva, Lilia Ignatova, and Maria Petrova. They won over 200 medals in 20 years. Bianka Panova became the first rhythmic gymnast to win all five individual events at a world championship. She was entered into the Guinness World Records for receiving full 10 marks in all eight routines at a world championship. Maria Petrova, along with earlier gymnast Maria Gigova, were both three-time world all-around champions; Petrova is also a three-time European all-around champion.

Robeva became a national hero for the success of her gymnasts, and she encouraged each gymnast to develop her own sense of artistry. However several former gymnasts who trained under her subsequently came forward with allegations that she abused them. Panova released an autobiography about her experience, which she called a "nightmare" and "very cruel", in which she recalled episodes of psychological abuse and extreme weight control such as being denied water. She also alleged in a 1999 interview that she was beaten to the point of blood being drawn; Stella Salapatiyska also alleged physical abuse as well as insults. Robeva admitted to hitting her gymnasts and often forcing them to repeat routines until after midnight. Both Panova and Salapatiyska were removed from the national team due to conflicts with Robeva.

In 2018, the Bulgarian National Lottery aired an advertisement featuring the "Golden Girls" of the national team at that time. The advertisement was the subject of criticism from some groups for using the image of the gymnasts, who are young adults often idolized by children, to advertise gambling, especially given the association of the gymnasts with national pride. The National Lottery did not respond to the criticism.
