= Marta Cantón =

Spanish rhythmic gymnast

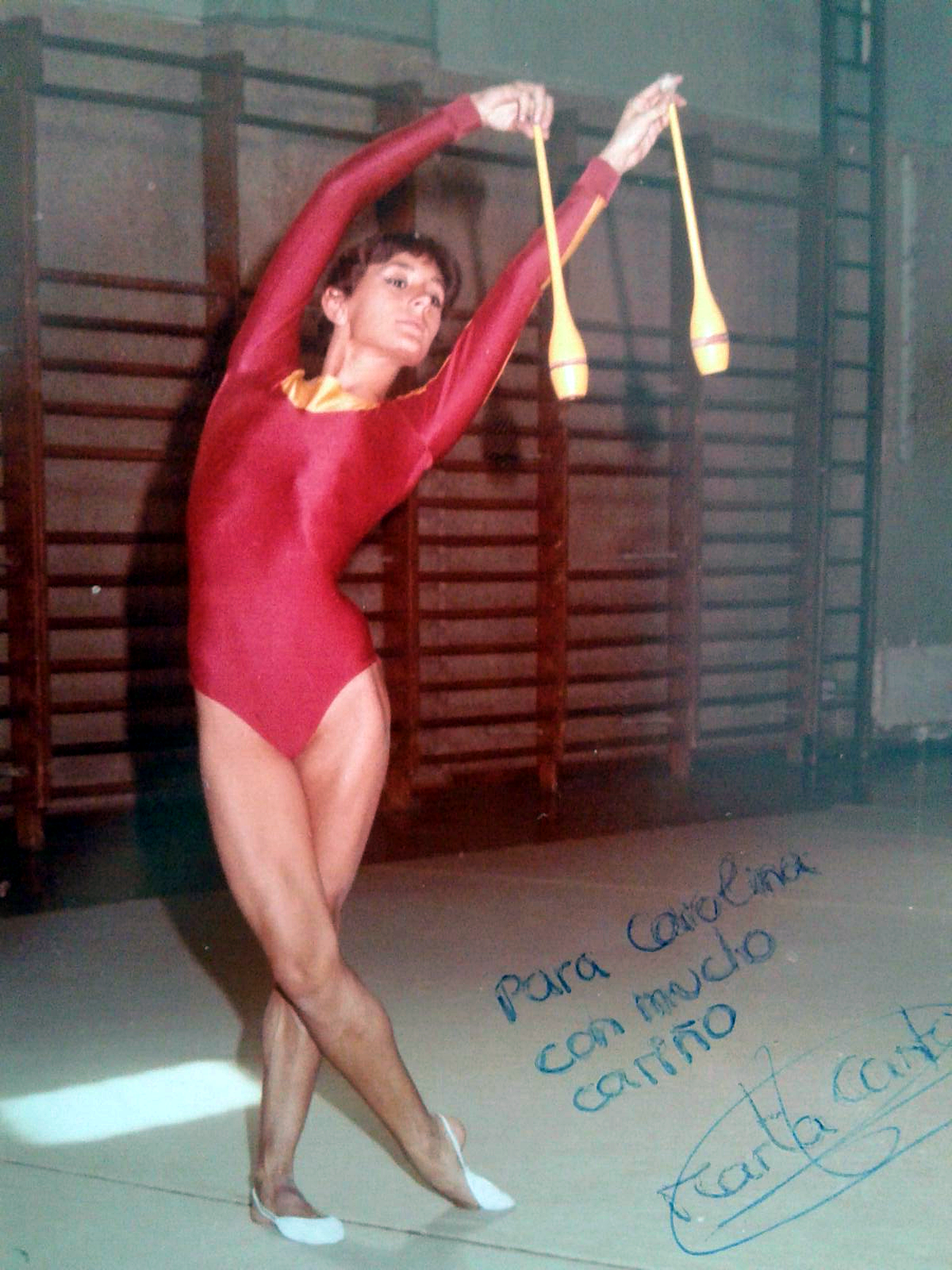
- Marta Cantón in 1983

Personal information
- Full name: Marta Cantón Gutiérrez
- Born: 28 December 1965 (age 60) Barcelona, Spain
- Height: 159 cm (5 ft 3 in)

Gymnastics career
- Discipline: Rhythmic gymnastics
- Country represented: Spain

Marta Cantón Gutiérrez (born 28 December 1965 in Barcelona) is a retired Spanish rhythmic gymnast.

She competed for Spain in the rhythmic gymnastics all-around competition at the 1984 Summer Olympics in Los Angeles. She tied for third place in the qualification, advanced to the final and ended up in sixth place overall.
