= Lilia Ignatova =

Bulgarian rhythmic gymnast

- Born: 17 May 1965 (age 61)

Gymnastics career
- Discipline: Rhythmic gymnastics
- Country represented: Bulgaria
- Retired: October 1986
Medal record
Representing Bulgaria
World Championships
Gold medal – first place	1981 Munich	Rope
Gold medal – first place	1981 Munich	Hoop
Gold medal – first place	1983 Strasbourg	Ball
Gold medal – first place	1983 Strasbourg	Clubs
Gold medal – first place	1985 Valladolid	Ball
Gold medal – first place	1985 Valladolid	Clubs
Silver medal – second place	1981 Munich	All-around
Silver medal – second place	1981 Munich	Clubs
Silver medal – second place	1983 Strasbourg	All-around
Silver medal – second place	1985 Valladolid	All-around
Bronze medal – third place	1983 Strasbourg	Hoop
Bronze medal – third place	1985 Valladolid	Rope
European Championships
Gold medal – first place	1980 Amsterdam	Clubs
Gold medal – first place	1980 Amsterdam	Ribbon
Gold medal – first place	1982 Stavanger	Ribbon
Gold medal – first place	1984 Vienna	Hoop
Gold medal – first place	1986 Florence	All-around
Gold medal – first place	1986 Florence	Rope
Gold medal – first place	1986 Florence	Clubs
Silver medal – second place	1980 Amsterdam	All-around
Silver medal – second place	1980 Amsterdam	Hoop
Silver medal – second place	1984 Vienna	Ball
Silver medal – second place	1986 Florence	Ribbon
World Cup Final
Gold medal – first place	1983 Belgrade	All-around
Gold medal – first place	1983 Belgrade	Hoop
Gold medal – first place	1986 Tokyo	All-around
Gold medal – first place	1986 Tokyo	Ball
Gold medal – first place	1986 Tokyo	Rope
Gold medal – first place	1986 Tokyo	Clubs
Silver medal – second place	1983 Belgrade	Ball
Silver medal – second place	1983 Belgrade	Clubs
Silver medal – second place	1983 Belgrade	Ribbon
Silver medal – second place	1986 Tokyo	Ribbon

Lilia Ignatova (Bulgarian: Лилия Павлова Игнатова; born 17 May 1965) is a Bulgarian modern rhythmic gymnast. She was one of the Golden Girls of Bulgaria who dominated rhythmic gymnastics in the 1980s.

== Early life ==
Ignatova was born on 17 May 1965 in Sofia, Bulgaria. Her twin sister Kamelia, was the pole player of the Bulgarian group exercise and became World Champion with the team in 1981.

== Gymnastics career ==
Ignatova was part of the "golden girl" generation, which dominated the sport in the early eighties. She won the all-around silver at the 1980 European Championships, with an additional silver for the hoop, and gold with clubs and ribbon. She repeated this feat at the 1981 World Rhythmic Gymnastics Championships, winning additional golds for rope and hoop and silver for clubs.

She won gold with the ribbon at the 1982 European Championships and Silver in the all around competition at the 1983 World Rhythmic Gymnastics Championships where she also won gold for clubs and balls and bronze for the hoop.

At the 1st World Cup Final in Belgrade in 1983, she won the all-around title. She won gold with hoop and silver with ball at the European Championships in Vienna in 1984, and came second at the 1985 World Rhythmic Gymnastics Championships to teammate Diliana Gueorguieva, where she also won gold with ball and clubs and bronze with rope.

In 1986, she became the European All-around Champion in Florence, this time sharing the first place together with the newcoming Bulgarian star Bianka Panova, with her final European Championships she was crowned with the Gold for the all-around competition, and golds for rope and clubs and the silver with ribbon. She completed six consecutive victories in the Julieta Shishmanova Cup and won her second World Cup Final title held in Tokyo, Japan, after which she retired.

== Gymnastics style and technique ==
Her routines combined a high degree of difficulty, such as a backward shoulder roll with a circling ribbon, with choreography set to a wide variety of modern and classical music. She gradually transformed her performing style, starting from dynamic, playful routines and finishing with esteemed pieces of art as "Ave Maria", with the ball 1986, to the violin accompaniment of the famous Mintcho Mintchev.

== Personal life ==
After retiring, she appeared in a film musical Akatamus, directed by Gueorgui Duylguerov and performed onstage for the Theater 13, an innovative drama, music and dance Company led by Bonio Lungov. She later coached at the Levski club where she began her career. In 1993, she returned to her "second home", the LEVSKI Spartak gymnastics hall in Gerena to coach beginners. She gave birth to her daughter in early 1995. In 1999, she was one of four rhythmic gymnasts inducted into the FIG Hall of Fame.
