= Galina Beloglazova =

Soviet rhythmic gymnast (born 1967)

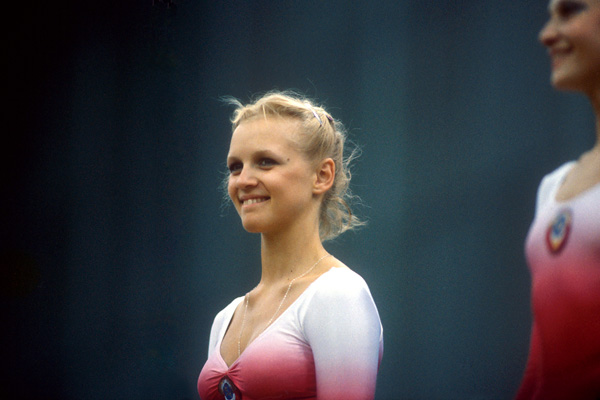
- Beloglazova at the 1986 Goodwill Games Moscow

Personal information
- Born: June 10, 1967 (age 59) Astrakhan, Soviet Union
- Height: 163 cm (5 ft 4 in)

Gymnastics career
- Discipline: Rhythmic gymnastics
- Country represented: Soviet Union
Medal record
Representing Soviet Union
World Championships
Gold medal – first place	1983 Strasbourg	Ball
Gold medal – first place	1983 Strasbourg	Ribbon
Gold medal – first place	1985 Valladolid	Ribbon
Silver medal – second place	1983 Strasbourg	All-around
Silver medal – second place	1983 Strasbourg	Hoop
Bronze medal – third place	1985 Valladolid	Ball
European Championships
Gold medal – first place	1984 Vienna	All-around
Gold medal – first place	1984 Vienna	Ribbon
Gold medal – first place	1986 Florence	Ball
Gold medal – first place	1986 Florence	Ribbon
Silver medal – second place	1984 Vienna	Ball
Bronze medal – third place	1984 Vienna	Hoop
Bronze medal – third place	1984 Vienna	Clubs
Bronze medal – third place	1986 Florence	All-around
Bronze medal – third place	1986 Florence	Clubs
World Cup Final
Silver medal – second place	1986 Tokyo	All-around
Bronze medal – third place	1986 Tokyo	Ribbon
Bronze medal – third place	1986 Tokyo	Ball
Goodwill Games
Gold medal – first place	1986 Moscow	Ball
Silver medal – second place	1986 Moscow	Clubs
Bronze medal – third place	1986 Moscow	All-around

Galina Beloglazova (Russian: Галина Павловна Белоглазова; born June 10, 1967, in Astrakhan, Soviet Union) is a Soviet individual rhythmic gymnast. She was the 1983 World All-around silver medalist and the 1984 European All-around champion.

== Career ==
Beloglazova began training at just 5 years old under Ludmila Tichomirova, who would coach the talented gymnast throughout her career. She emerged onto the international scene at the traditional Intervision Cup in Cottbus GDR in1980 where as she placed first as a junior. As a senior, she was chosen as the alternate to the Soviet team at the 1982 European Championships, but her performance in practice impressed her coaches so much that they put the 15-year-old in the competition lineup. She wound up 7th in the all-around and qualified to two event finals. Beloglazova would soon be among the leading Soviet gymnasts of the 1980s along with Marina Lobatch, Tatiana Druchinina, and Dalia Kutkaitė.

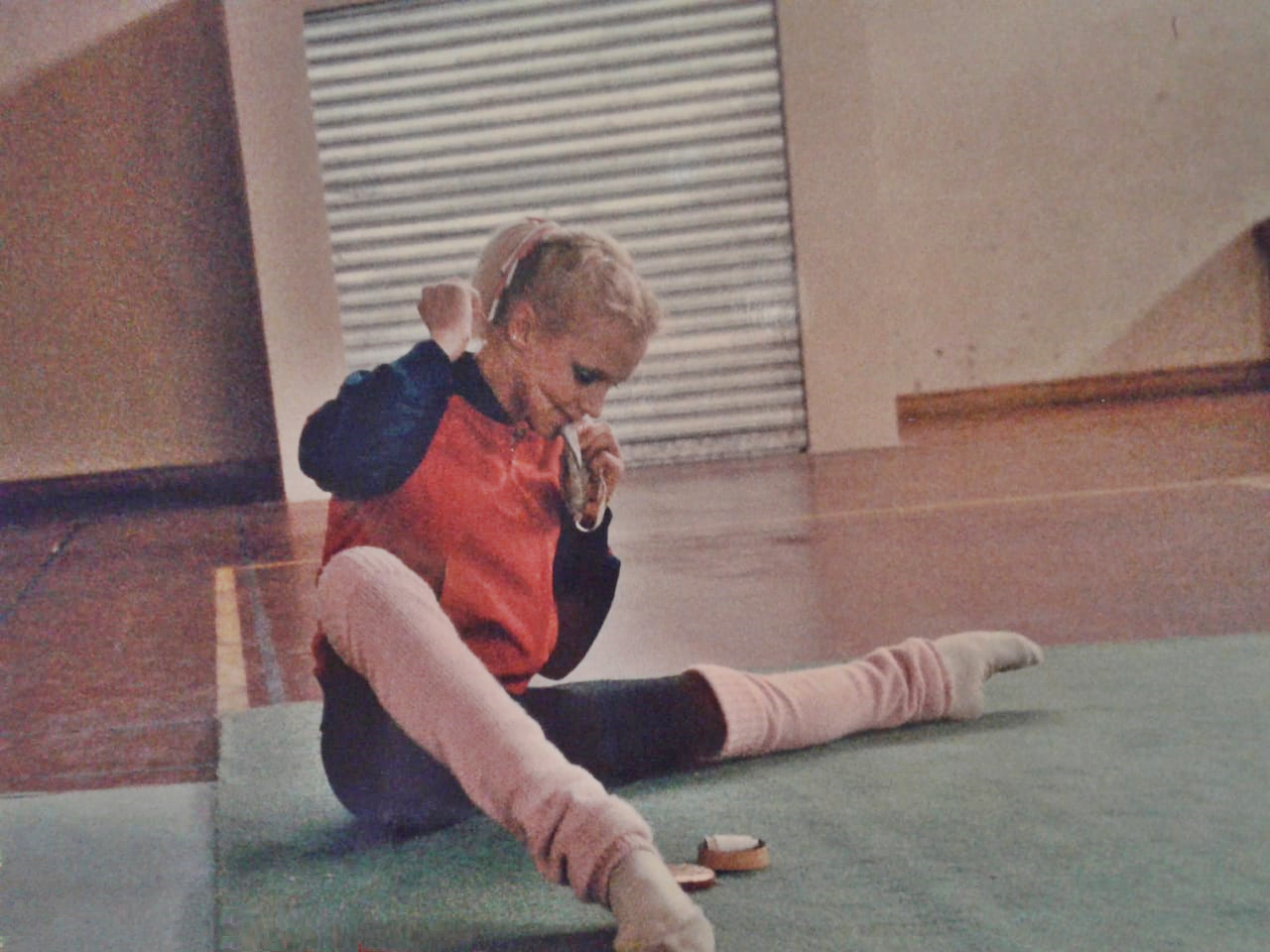
Beloglazova at the 1985 World Championships.

In 1983, Beloglazova nearly won the 1983 World Championship title, which upset the Bulgarian team. If not for a drop on the very last note of her clubs exercise, Beloglazova would have defeated Bulgarian gymnast Diliana Guerguieva. Instead, she tied for silver and won three more medals in apparatus finals (gold with ball and ribbon and silver with hoop). Most impressively, she counted four perfect 10s in the event competition.

At the 1984 Europeans, Beloglazova won the all-around gold medal. She also won medals on each of the 4 apparatus, gold with ribbon, silver with ball, and bronze with hoop and clubs. Her performance at the 1986 Europeans also earned her the all-around bronze medal, as well as a pair of golds for ribbon and ball and a bronze for clubs in the event finals.

Beloglazova would perform in her last major competition, at the 1986 Goodwill Games. She finished 3rd all-around, 2nd with clubs, and 1st with ball. She also won the prize for the title of "Miss Goodwill Games."

== Personal life ==
Beloglazova was formerly married to Estonian basketball player Heino Enden, with whom she has a son Anthony Enden (born 1987). Beloglazova has degrees in English and German languages.V. Atkinson.

Beloglazova is remarried and has been living in the United States since October 2012.
