= Regina Weber =

German rhythmic gymnast

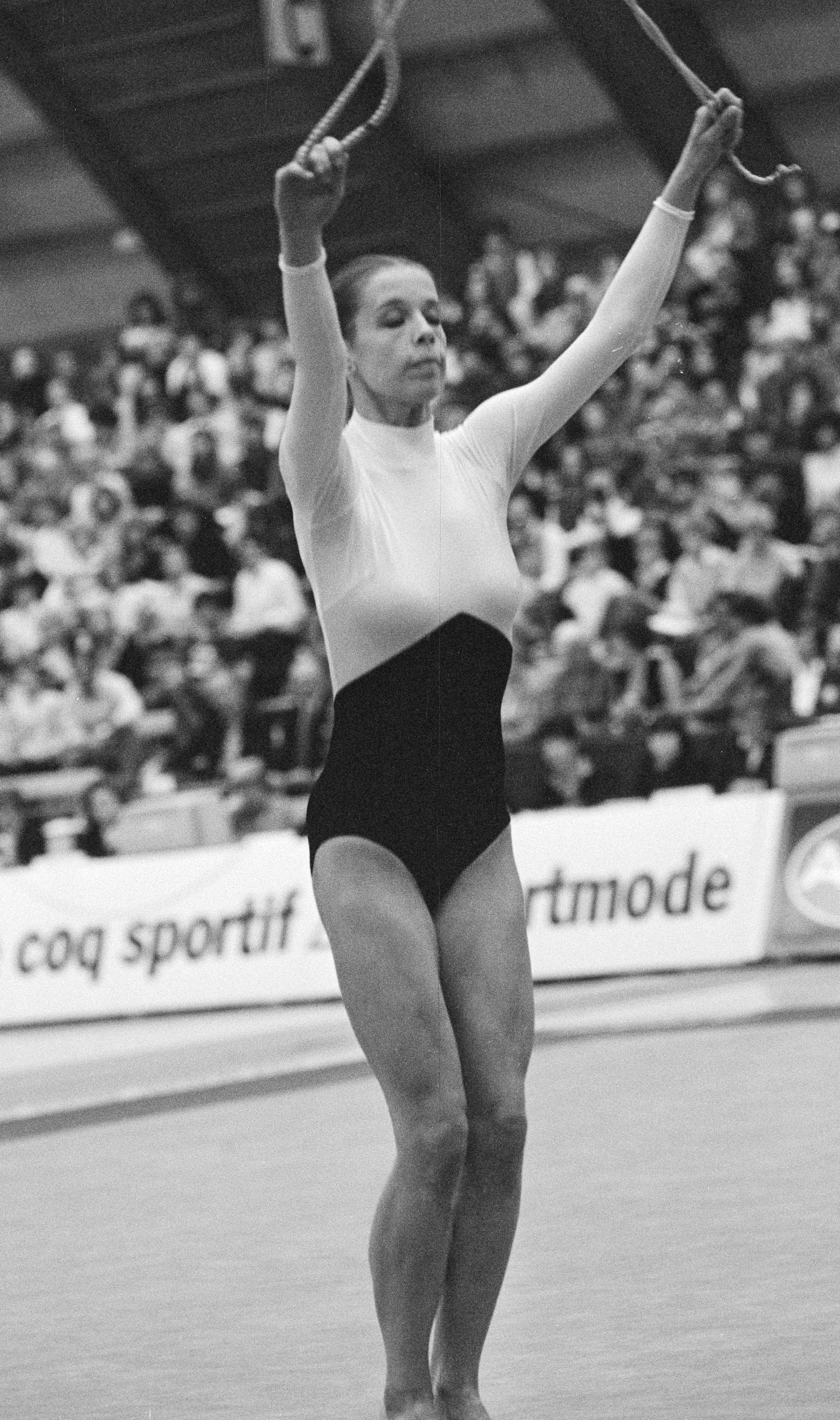
- Weber in 1980

Personal information
- Born: 12 April 1963 (age 63) Winsen an der Luhe, Niedersachsen, West Germany
- Height: 1.73 m (5 ft 8 in)

Gymnastics career
- Discipline: Rhythmic gymnastics
- Country represented: West Germany
- Club: TV Wattenscheid
Medal record
Representing West Germany
Rhythmic Gymnastics
Olympic Games
Bronze medal – third place	1984 Los Angeles	All-around

Regina Weber (born 12 April 1963) is a German former individual rhythmic gymnast who competed for West Germany. She is the 1984 Olympic bronze medalist and a six-time German national all-around champion.

== Personal life ==
Weber is married to Senegalese former footballer Souleyman Sané. They have three sons: Kim Sané, Leroy Sané and Sidi Sané.

== Career ==
Weber competed for TV Wattenscheid. Between 1981 and 1986 she won nearly all national titles in various rhythmic gymnastics events in West Germany, including all the all-around titles, and she was the silver medalist in 1987.

Weber participated in the first European Championships in 1978, where she placed 14th in the all-around. The next year, she competed at her first World Championships at the 1979 World Championships, where she was 14th in the all-around and competed in the ball final.

At her next European Championships in 1980, she placed 6th in the all-around and qualified for three event finals, all but ribbon, and placed 8th in all three. The next year, she was 10th at the 1981 World Championships, and the year after, she tied for 9th at the 1982 European Championships. She tied for 8th at the 1983 World Championships.

When rhythmic gymnastics was officially added as an Olympic sport in 1984, athletes from the USSR and Bulgaria were considered to be the medal favorites, but the Soviet-led boycott of the 1984 Summer Olympics meant the top competitors were absent. Weber went on to win the bronze medal at the 1984 Summer Olympics behind Romanian silver medalist Doina Stăiculescu. This was the only Olympic medal won by a German gymnast until Darja Varfolomeev won gold at the 2024 Summer Olympics four decades later. She finished her 1984 season by competing at the European Championships in November, where she placed 11th in the all-around and qualified for the ball and clubs finals.

Weber did not compete at the 1985 World Championships, but at the 1986 European Championships, she was 7th in the all-around and qualified for all four apparatus finals. Her last major competition was the 1987 World Championships, where she finished 12th in the all-around and qualified to the hoop final.

She currently works as a teacher in Bochum.
