= Ana Martínez =

Ana Martínez may refer to:

- Ana Martínez Collado (born 1950), Spanish art theorist
- Ana Martínez (handballer) (born 1991), Spanish handball player
- Ana Martínez (gymnast), Spanish rhythmic gymnast
- Ana Martinez de Luco, American nun and founder of recycling center Sure We Can
- Ana Martínez Zaragoza (born 1981), Spanish politician
- Ana Lucía Martínez (born 1990), Guatemalan footballer
- Ana María de Martínez (1937–2012), Salvadoran artist
- Ana María Martínez (born 1971), Puerto Rican soprano
- Ana María Martínez Labella, Spanish politician
- Ana María Martínez Sagi (1907–2000), Catalonian poet, journalist, feminist and athlete
