= Ana Martínez (gymnast) =

Spanish rhythmic gymnast

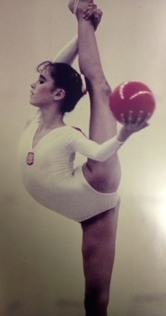

Personal information
- Full name: Ana Mª Martínez Gómez
- Born: 26 March 1972 (age 54) Alicante

Gymnastics career
- Discipline: Rhythmic gymnastics
- Country represented: Spain (1985-1987)
- Club: Club Jitte
- Head coach: Emilia Boneva
- Retired: yes
Medal record
Representing Spain
European Championships
Bronze medal – third place	1986 Florence	Group All-Around
World Championships
Bronze medal – third place	1987 Varna	Group All-Around
Bronze medal – third place	1987 Varna	3 Hoops + 3 Balls

Ana Mª Martínez Gómez (born 26 March 1972) is a retired Spanish rhythmic gymnast. She's a European and World bronze medalist.

== Biography ==
Martínez began her sporting career at the age of 8 at the Jesús-María School in Ciudad de Asís, where Paqui Maneus trained her for 5 years. In 1983 she was the Spanish Individual Champion in Malaga and the following year she won gold at the French International Tournament in Venissieux. In 1985 she was called up to join the Spanish team.

Ana was incorporated into the Spanish senior group, training at the Moscardó Gymnasium in Madrid under the orders of Emilia Boneva and the group coach, Ana Roncero. Georgi Neykov was the team's choreographer and Violeta Portaska was the pianist in charge of providing live music for the routines. By 1986, with the retirement of María Fernández and several of her teammates, she became a starter of the new group. That she year won bronze at the European Championships in Florence, along Eva Obalat, Natalia Marín, Estela Martín, Marisa Centeno and Elena Velasco. A month later they traveled to Tokyo to compete in the World Cup Final, where they achieved 4th place.

Since 1987 groups started to compete with two routines, thus the creation of event finals. That year, at the World Championships in Varna, Martínez, as an alternate, won bronze in the All-Around and with 3 hoops and 3 balls, finishing 4th with 6 balls, slong Natalia Marín, Mari Carmen Moreno, Marta Pardós, Astrid Sánchez and Elena Velasco, with Ana Carlota de la Fuente as the other substitute.

At the end of September 1987, she retired with fellow Alicante gymnast Marisa Centeno. Both argued lack of motivation due to the lack of compensation for the effort they made.

In 1996 she obtained a degree in physical education from the INEF in Madrid. Since 1999 she has been a teacher at different Secondary Education Centres in the province of Alicante. From 2005 to 2010 she taught the subject "technical, tactical and didactic foundations of Gymnastics" at the Miguel Hernández University in Elche, to the first class of the Degree in Physical Activity and Sports Sciences, as an associate professor. Since 2015 she has worked as a tenured Physical Education teacher at the IES María Blasco in San Vicente del Raspeig in Alicante.

After Emilia Boneva's death on 20 September 2019, Ana and other former national gymnasts gathered to pay tribute to her during the Euskalgym held on 16 November 2019, the event took place before 8,500 attendees at the Bilbao Exhibition Center de Baracaldo and was followed by a dinner in her honor.
