= Pilar Domenech =

Spanish rhythmic gymnast

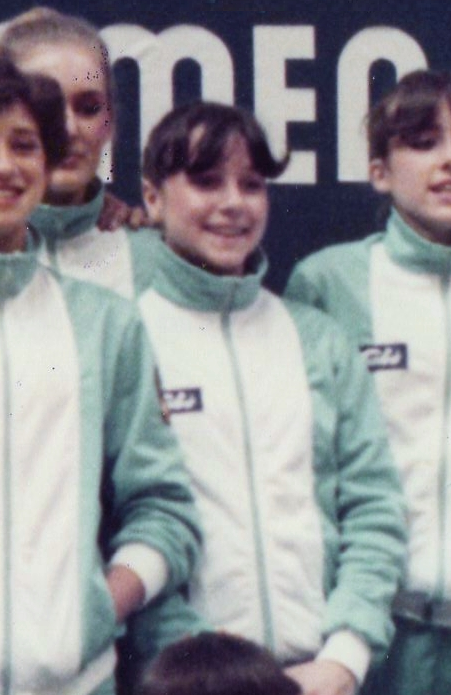

Personal information
- Born: 10 May 1966 (age 60) Madrid, Spain

Gymnastics career
- Discipline: Rhythmic gymnastics
- Country represented: Spain (1982-1986)
- Head coach: Emilia Boneva
- Retired: yes
Medal record
Representing Spain
European Championships
Bronze medal – third place	1984 Vienna	Group All-Around

Pilar Domenech (born 10 May 1966) is a former Spanish rhythmic gymnast, member of the national group. She won a European bronze medal in 1984.

== Career ==
Pilar entered the national team in 1982, training at the Moscardó Gymnasium in Madrid under the orders of Emilia Boneva and the group coach, Ana Roncero. Georgi Neykov was the team's choreographer and Violeta Portaska was the pianist in charge of providing live music for the routines.

In 1982, she participated as a substitute along María Fernández, María Martín and Sonia Somoza and the main quintet Mónica Alcaraz, Elena García, Isabel García, Victoria García and Dolores Tamariz, in the European Championships in Stavanger, where Spain placed 4th.

In 1983 she was again a substitute in the World Cup Final in Belgrade, where the group finished 4th. In the second half of the year Elena Garcia and Victoria Garcia retired, Pilar then made the starting five, competing in the World Championships in Strasbourg along Pino Díaz, María Fernández Ostolaza, Isabel García, Virginia Manzanera and Sonia Somoza with Dolores Tamariz as the alternate getting 5th place.

In 1984 Domenech was part of the Spanish group that won bronze at the European Championship in Vienna. The members of the group were Pilar, Virginia Manzanera, María Fernández Ostolaza, Eva Obalat, Nancy Usero and Graciela Yanes, in addition to Rocío Ducay and Ofelia Rodríguez as substitutes. After this achievement, they were all awarded the Medal of Gymnastic Merit of 1984 from the Royal Spanish Gymnastics Federation that was given to them in 1985 in a ceremony presided over by Alfonso de Borbón y Dampierre, Duke of Cádiz, then president of the COE.

In the World Championships in Valladolid in 1985, along María Fernández, Eva Obalat, Ofelia Rodríguez, Nancy Usero and Graciela Yanes, with Ester Domínguez, Rocío Ducay, Laura Manzanera and Estela Martín as substitutes, Spain was 7th in the All-Around.

After her retirement in 1986 she started working as a coach of the national team in 1988. After Emilia Boneva's death on 20 September 2019, María and other former national gymnasts gathered to pay tribute to her during the Euskalgym held on 16 November 2019, the event took place before 8,500 attendees at the Bilbao Exhibition Center de Baracaldo and was followed by a dinner in her honor.

== Legacy and influence ==
The bronze medal at the 1984 European Championships in Vienna marked a significant milestone for the Spanish rhythmic gymnastics team, being their first since 1975. This achievement paved the way for a sustained period of international success. In a 2016 interview, María Fernández Ostolaza emphasized the pivotal role this medal played in shaping the future of Spanish rhythmic gymnastics.

At that time, what we wanted was to overthrow the Eastern countries [...] As the medals were always Russia, Bulgaria and Czechoslovakia, ours was a great milestone and the bronze in the European Championship was indeed a feat for the team . It was the start of something.
