= Ágnes Fajt =

Hungarian rhythmic gymnast

- Alternative name: Ágnes Fajt-Kisteleki
- Born: 2 December 1953 Budapest, Hungary
- Died: May 2020 (aged 66–67)
- Spouse: István Kisteleki

Gymnastics career
- Discipline: Rhythmic gymnastics
- Country represented: Hungary; (1976-1981)
- Club: Újpesti Dózsa / Óbuda Tsz SE
- Retired: yes

Ágnes Fajt-Kisteleki (2 December 1953 – before 23 May 2020) was a Hungarian rhythmic gymnast and coach.

== Career ==
From 1966 and 1977 Fajt was a competitor for Újpesti Dózsa, winning the national group championships in 1973 and bronze with ribbon in 1976. From 1978 to 1981 she competed for Óbuda Tsz SE, winning bronze with hoop at nationals in 1980.

She integrated the national team in 1976 as a member of the group. In 1979 she was selected for the World Championships in London, where the Hungarian group tied for 11th place. In October 1980 she competed in the European Championships in Amsterdam, her and her group mates took 4th place in the final. The following year she was part of the group that performed at the World Championships in Munich, tying for 12th place overall.

In 1981, she earned a coach's certificate from the College of Physical Education, from then on she worked as a coach for the Óbuda Tsz SE. Then she became head of the rhythmic gymnastics department. In 1989, she became the head of the Hungarian rhythmic gymnastics judging committee.

She died in May 2020 after a long illness.

== Personal life ==
Fajt married footballer, coach, and sports director István Kisteleki. Their daughters Dóra Kisteleki, Orsolya Kisteleki and Hanna Kisteleki are renowned water polo players.
