= Victoria García =

Spanish rhythmic gymnast (born 1965)

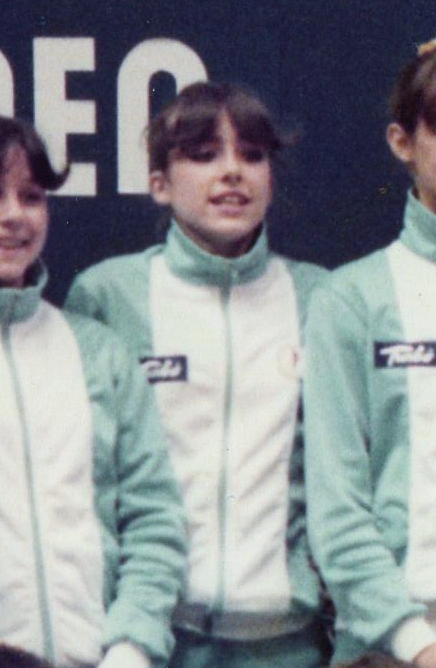

Personal information
- Full name: Victoria García Gasco
- Nickname: Viki
- Born: 5 August 1965 (age 61) Madrid, Spain

Gymnastics career
- Discipline: Rhythmic gymnastics
- Country represented: Spain; (1980-1983)
- Club: Club Gimnasio Moscardó
- Head coach: Emilia Boneva
- Retired: yes

Victoria García Gasco (born 5 August 1965), also known as Viki García, is a retired Spanish rhythmic gymnast. She represented her country in international competitions.

== Biography ==
García took up the sport at the Club Gimnasio Moscardó in Madrid at age 13 under the guidance of Goyita Postigo.

In 1980 she joined the Spanish national group, as third substitute, which will remain until 1983. She then trained in the Moscardó gymnasium under the head coach Emilia Boneva and the group coach Ana Roncero. Georgi Neykov was the choreographer of the team and Violeta Portaska was the pianist hired play the music for the routines.

In 1982, Victoria participated (along Mónica Alcaraz, Elena García, Isabel García, Virginia Manzanera and Dolores Tamariz, with Pilar Domenech, María Fernández, María Martín and Sonia Somoza as substitutes) in the European Championships in Stavanger, where Spain placed 4th.

In 1983 García, Elena García, Isabel García, Virginia Manzanera, Sonia Somoza and Dolores Tamariz (with Pilar Domenech and María Fernández as substitutes) competed in the World Cup Final in Belgrade, where the group finished 4th. She retired shortly before the World Championships in Strasbourg.

After Boneva's death on 20 September 2019, Victoria and other former national gymnasts gathered to pay tribute to her during the Euskalgym held on 16 November 2019. The event took place before 8,500 attendees at the Bilbao Exhibition Center de Baracaldo and was followed by a dinner in Boneva's honor.
