= Virginia Manzanera =

Spanish rhythmic gymnast

- Born: 26 March 1965 (age 61) Valladolid, Spain

Gymnastics career
- Discipline: Rhythmic gymnastics
- Country represented: Spain; (1980-1985)
- Club: Club Vallisoletano
- Head coach: Emilia Boneva
- Retired: yes
Medal record
Representing Spain
European Championships
Bronze medal – third place	1984 Vienna	Group All-Around

Virginia Manzanera (born 26 March 1965) is a former Spanish rhythmic gymnast and coach. She won a European bronze medal in 1984.

== Biography ==
Virginia began practicing rhythmic gymnastics when she was 9 years old at the Club Vallisoletano in Valladolid, the only rhythmic club that existed in the city at the time. Her sister Laura followed her footsepts, later joining her into the national team.

In 1978 she won gold in freehands in the 2nd category in the Spanish Individual Championship. In 1979 she won All-Around silver in the 2nd category of the Spanish Championship in Madrid. In 1980 she was 5th in the All-Around of the 1st category at nationals held in Alicante.

She was then scouted to join the national team, training at the Moscardó Gymnasium in Madrid under the orders of Emilia Boneva and the group coach, Ana Roncero. Georgi Neykov was the team's choreographer and Violeta Portaska was the pianist in charge of providing live music for the routines.

In 1982, Manzanera participated as part of the Spanish group along Mónica Alcaraz, Elena García, Isabel García, Victoria García and Dolores Tamariz, with Pilar Domenech, María Fernández, María Martín and Sonia Somoza as substitutes, in the European Championships in Stavanger, where Spain placed 4th.

In 1983 she competed in the World Cup Final in Belgrade, where the group finished 4th, and in the World Championships in Strasbourg, getting 5th place.

In 1984 Virginia was part of the Spanish group that won bronze at the European Championship in Vienna. The members of the group were Virginia, Pilar Domenech, María Fernández Ostolaza, Eva Obalat, Nancy Usero and Graciela Yanes, in addition to Rocío Ducay and Ofelia Rodríguez as substitutes. After this achievement, they were all awarded the Medal of Gymnastic Merit of 1984 from the Royal Spanish Gymnastics Federation that was given to them in 1985 in a ceremony presided over by Alfonso de Borbón y Dampierre, Duke of Cádiz, then president of the COE.

The following year she competed as an individual in the World Championships held in her native Valladolid, taking 22nd place in the All-Around.

After her retirement she became a coach, eventually training the national team's gymnasts Alicia Martín and Amaya Cardeñoso at the then recently inaugurated Technical Center of Castilla y León. She currently runs a company that manufactures wooden wine boxes. Her nieace María Arthaud, Laura's daughter, competes in rhythmic gymnastics at the national level.

== Legacy and influence ==
The bronze medal at the European Championships in Vienna in 1984 was the first for the Spanish group since 1975, and then began a long period of winning international medals. In an interview in 2016, María Fernández Ostolaza highlighted the importance of that medal for Spanish rhythmic gymnastics:

At that time, what we wanted was to overthrow the Eastern countries [...] As the medals were always Russia, Bulgaria and Czechoslovakia, ours was a great milestone and the bronze in the European Championship was indeed a feat for the team . It was the start of something.
