= Leticia Herrería =

Spanish rhythmic gymnast

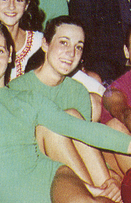

Personal information
- Full name: Leticia Herrería de la Lastra
- Born: 29 November 1958 (age 67) Santoña, Spain

Gymnastics career
- Discipline: Rhythmic gymnastics
- Country represented: Spain (1974-1976)
- Head coach: Ivanka Chakarova
- Retired: yes
Medal record
Rhythmic Gymnastics
Representing Spain
World Championships
Bronze medal – third place	1975 Madrid	Group All-Around

Leticia Herrería (born 29 November 1958) is a former Spanish rhythmic gymnast. She won a bronze medal at Worlds in 1975.

== Career ==
She moved to Madrid in 1967 and began practicing artistic gymnastics at the age of 8. In 1973 she participated to the first course of rhythmic gymnastics coaches and judges, organized by the Spanish Gymnastics Federation and taught by coaches Egle Abruzzini of Italy and Madame Abad of Hungary. From that course, her coach Carmen Algora switched to rhythmic gymnastics and Leticia began training with her at the club Cuartel de la Montaña. In April 1975, at the 1st Spanish Rhythmic Gymnastics Championship, held in Madrid, she won the gold medal with rope.

She was part of the first national rhythmic gymnastics team in Spain, created by the Spanish Gymnastics Federation in 1974. She became a member of the senior group. The team coach was the Bulgarian Ivanka Chakarova, with the help of Carmen Algora. At first they trained in the gym of the Consejo Superior de Deportes, where there was no carpet, and later they went to the Moscardó Gymnasium in Madrid. Towards June 1975 she traveled with the national team to Bulgaria for a two-month training camp in Sofia and Varna.

On November 24, 1975, at the World Championships in Madrid, the group won the bronze medal in the All-Around, being the first official international medal for the Spanish group. The exercise they performed was 3 balls and 3 ropes, and the team was made up of María José, María José Rodríguez, Carmen Lorca, Herminia Mata, María Eugenia Rodríguez and Marilín Such, in addition to Teresa López, Mercedes Trullols and Cathy Xaudaró as substitutes. Although the start of the competition was initially scheduled for November 20, it had to be delayed due to the death of Francisco Franco. Leticia retired from competitions in 1977.

After her retirement, she studied INEF in Madrid from 1980 to 1985. Until 1998, she was a coach and international judge of rhythmic gymnastics. In addition, she was choreographer of the national women's artistic gymnastics team (1985 - 1987) and director of the National Gymnastics School (1986 - 1990). In 1986 she also began to be Professor of Physical Education at the Colegio San Patricio de El Soto de la Moraleja in Alcobendas, where she continues to teach today.
