= Daniela Bošanská =

Czech rhythmic gymnast (born 1962)

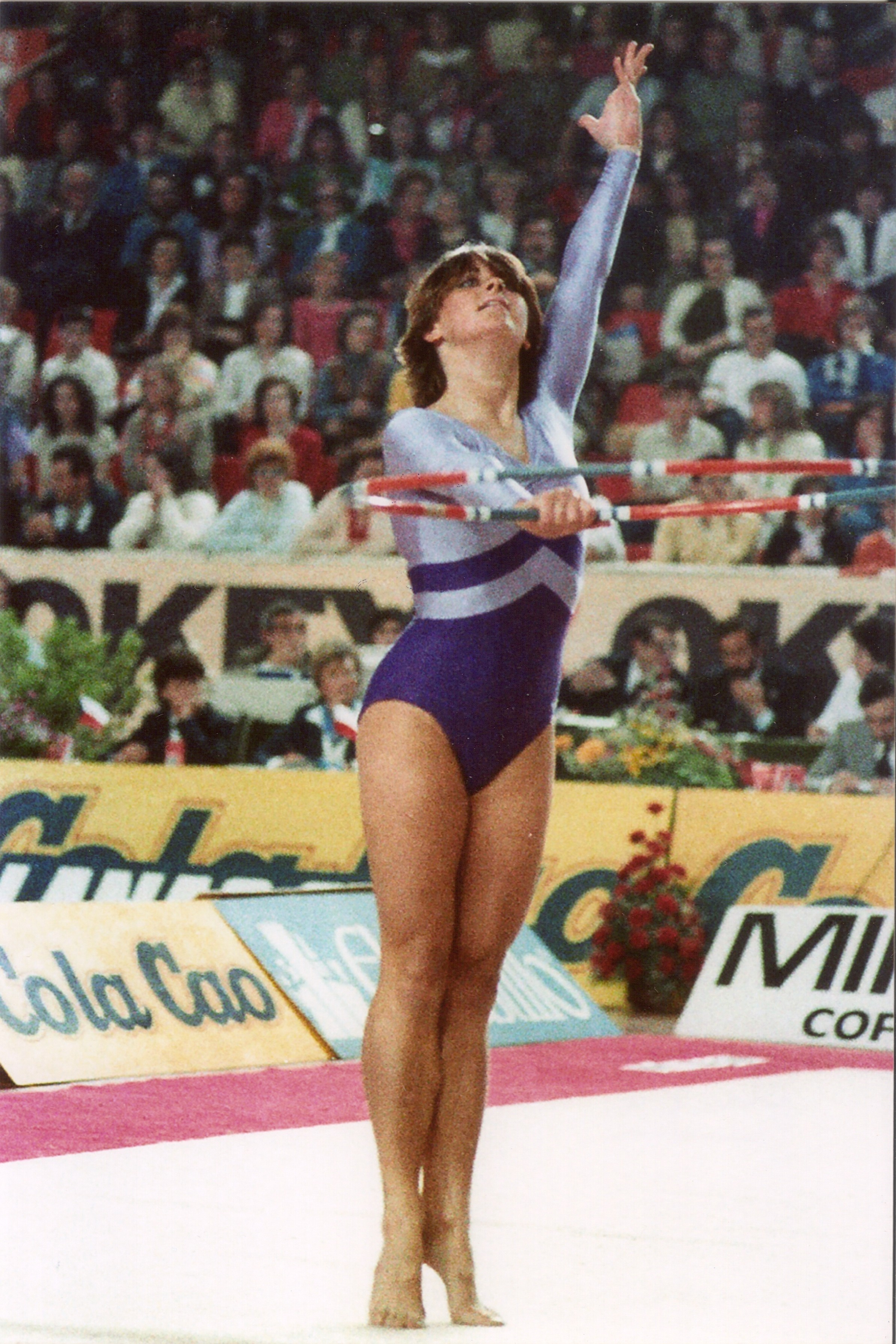
- Born: 22 August 1962 (age 64) Prague, Czechoslovakia

Gymnastics career
- Discipline: Rhythmic gymnastics
- Country represented: Czechoslovakia (1978–1982)
- Retired: yes
Medal record
Representing Czechoslovakia
World Championships
Gold medal – first place	1979 London	Clubs
European Championships
Silver medal – second place	1978 Madrid	Ribbon
Bronze medal – third place	1980 Amsterdam	Rope

Daniela Bošanská (born 22 August 1962) is a Czech former rhythmic gymnast. She is a European and World medalist and three-time Czech national champion.

== Career ==
Daniela debuted at the 1978 European Championships in Madrid, where she was 4th in the all-around and with rope. She tied with Irina Deriugina for silver with ribbon. In 1979 she was selected for the World Championships in London, where she finished 8th in the all-around and 7th with rope. She tied for gold in clubs along with Irina Deriugina and Iliana Raeva.

In 1980 she competed at the European Championships in Amsterdam. She was 9th in the All-Around, 4th with clubs and 3rd with rope. At the World Championships in Munich in 1981, she took 7th place in the all-around, 7th with rope and hoop, and 5th with clubs. Her last international competition was the European Championships in Stavanger in 1982, where she ended 6th in the all-around along with rope and hoop, 5th with clubs and 7th with ribbon.

On a national level, she was the national champion from 1978 to 1980.
