= Marisa Centeno =

Spanish rhythmic gymnast

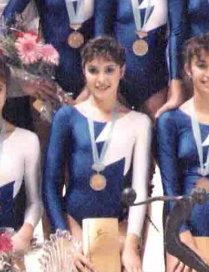

Personal information
- Full name: Marisa Centeno Carrasco
- Born: 16 August 1970 (age 56) Madrid, Spain

Gymnastics career
- Discipline: Rhythmic gymnastics
- Country represented: Spain (1986-1987)
- Club: Club Atlético Montemar
- Head coach: Emilia Boneva
- Retired: yes
Medal record
Representing Spain
European Championships
Bronze medal – third place	1986 Florence	Group All-Around
World Championships
Bronze medal – third place	1987 Varna	Group All-Around
Bronze medal – third place	1987 Varna	3 Hoops + 3 Balls

Marisa Centeno Carrasco (born 16 August 1970) is a retired Spanish rhythmic gymnast. She's a European and World bronze medalist.

== Biography ==
Although born in Madrid, she has always lived in the city of Alicante, with the exception of the period in the national team. She began practicing rhythmic gymnastics at the age of 8 at the Club Atlético Montemar in Alicante.

Marisa was incorporated into the Spanish national team, training at the Moscardó Gymnasium in Madrid under the orders of Emilia Boneva and the group coach, Ana Roncero. Georgi Neykov was the team's choreographer and Violeta Portaska was the pianist in charge of providing live music for the routines. By 1986, with the retirement of María Fernández and several of her teammates, she became a starter of the new group. That she year won bronze at the European Championships in Florence, along Eva Obalat, Natalia Marín, Estela Martín, Ana Martínez and Elena Velasco. A month later they traveled to Tokyo to compete in the World Cup Final, where they achieved 4th place.

Since 1987 groups started to compete with two routines, thus the creation of event finals. That year, at the World Championships in Varna, Centeno won bronze in the All-Around and with 3 hoops and 3 balls, finishing 4th with 6 balls, along Natalia Marín, Mari Carmen Moreno, Marta Pardós, Astrid Sánchez and Elena Velasco, with Ana Carlota de la Fuente and Ana Martínez as substitutes.

At the end of September 1987, Centeno retired with fellow Alicante gymnast Ana Martínez. Both argued lack of motivation due to the lack of compensation for the effort they made.

From 1990 to 1991 she studied as secretary of computer management at the Fundesem Business School in Alicante. From September 1991 to April 2012, she held several positions in the commercial department of the group of companies of the Alicante Dock Restaurant. She also trained as a professional expert in tourism sector management at UNED (2008) and in general accounting at Fundesem (2013), in addition to doing a course in Digital Marketing at the Interactive Advertising Bureau (2015) and Community Management at FUNED (2015).

After Emilia Boneva's death on 20 September 2019, Marisa and other former national gymnasts gathered to pay tribute to her during the Euskalgym held on 16 November 2019, the event took place before 8,500 attendees at the Bilbao Exhibition Center de Baracaldo and was followed by a dinner in her honor.
