= Maya Georgieva =

Maya Georgieva may refer to:

- Maya Georgieva (volleyball)
- Maya Georgieva (gymnast)
