= Susana Mendizábal =

Spanish rhythmic and artistic gymnast

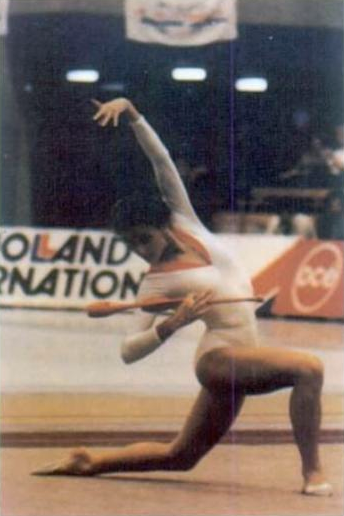

Personal information
- Full name: Susana Mendizábal Albizu
- Born: 29 January 1962 (age 64) Jaca, Spain

Gymnastics career
- Discipline: Artistic Gymnastics / Rhythmic Gymnastics
- Country represented: Spain; (1974-1975 / 1976-1980)
- Club: Club Natación Metropole
- Head coach: Ivanka Chakarova
- Assistant coaches: María José Rodríguez, Teresa López
- Retired: yes
Medal record
Rhythmic Gymnastics
Representing Spain
European Championships
Bronze medal – third place	1978 Madrid	All-around

Susana Mendizábal (born 29 January 1962) is a former Spanish rhythmic and artistic gymnast. She is the first Spaniard to win a medal in the European Championships, winning bronze in 1978.

== Personal life ==
She is married and has two children: María and Jorge.

== Career ==
Susana began her career as a gymnast at the age of 7. Three years later she trained daily at the Club Natación Metropole in Las Palmas de Gran Canaria and participated in her first Spanish Artistic Gymnastics Championship. In 1974 she traveled to Madrid to join the national team of artistic gymnastics under Ramón García Pascual. At this stage, she beam and vault national champion, and was 44th in the Canadian Pre-Olympic in 1975. In mid 1975, just before the Mediterranean Games, a severe fall of the balance beam caused a cervical injury, which caused her to wear a collar for 6 months and to abandon artistic gymnastics.

During the rehabilitation of her injury, the national rhythmic gymnastics coach, Ivanka Chakarova, gave her the opportunity to join the national rhythmic gymnastics team. As early as May 1976, he attended the Stoudenska Tribouna Cup in Sofia with the rest of the individual team. In May 1977 she was 21st at the Stoudenska Tribouna Cup in Sofia. In October of that year she was 20th in the World Championships in Basel. In December she won bronze in the All-Around at the Spanish Rhythmic Gymnastics Championships in Gijón. In May 1978, she competed along María Jesús Alegre in the Corbeil-Essonnes International Tournament, where she was 8th overall, 7th with ribbon and 6th with clubs.

In November 1978 she won the bronze medal in the All-Around of the European Championships in Madrid, the first edition of the competition. This medal remains so far the only one obtained by Spain in the individual All-Around of that competition. In addition, Susana was 4th in the rope and ribbon finals and 7th in the ball final. She was trained by Ivanka Chakarova and former gymnasts María José Rodríguez and Teresa López, and also had José García Aguayo as her pianist, since then the music was performed live during the competitions. In the same year she won gold in the 4 events, including the All-Around, at the national championship.

In 1979 she placed 15th overall in the World Championship in London. In 1980, her last active year, she was 7th overall at the European Championships in Amsterdam, as well as 4th in the ribbon final and 6th in the clubs final.

After her retirement in 1980, Mendizábal got a degree in INEF, then she was appointed director of the Municipal School of Gymnastics of Las Rozas. She was also an international judge, the vice-presidency of the Royal Spanish Federation of Gymnastics, published several publications and a doctoral thesis in 2000 (Pathology in high-performance rhythmic gymnasts, retired) that tried to eliminate much of the negative topics (anorexia, lack of growth) that were related to rhythmic gymnastics. Mendizábal presented sports in the Informativo diario de Telecinco in 1995 and 1996. She was a commentator on gymnastics and figure skating on TVE between 1981 and 1993, and broadcast all gymnastic disciplines of the 2000 Sydney Olympics, usually alongside Paloma del Rio.

After teaching several subjects related to gymnastic skills at the INEF in Madrid, she moved in 1998 to the University of Castilla-La Mancha in Toledo. Susana became dean of the Faculty of Sports Sciences of the University of Castilla. She was unanimously elected on 25 May 2005, remaining in office until 25 April 2012. Mendizábal taught four subjects: fundamentals of rhythmic gymnastics and acrobatics, specialization in gymnastics and acrobatics, movement and expression and high-performance rhythmic gymnastics. She also holds a master's degree for high performance coaches in Latin America. And is also a member of the Athletes Commission of the Spanish Olympic Committee.

She has written several books, including "Initiation to Rhythmic Gymnastics 1: Hands Free, Rope and Ball" (1985), "Initiation to Rhythmic Gymnastics 2: Hoop, Ribbon and Clubs" (1987) and "Foundations of Rhythmic Gymnastics: Myths and Realities" (2001). Susana has also written documents such as the Improvement Plan 2007-2011 of the Degree in Physical Activity and Sport Sciences of the University of Castilla-La Mancha, within the Institutional Evaluation Program 2005–2006.

== legacy and influence ==
Mendizábal was the first rhythmic Spanish gymnast to achieve a medal in the European Championship in 1978. In the book "Pinceladas de rittmica", former gymnast Montse Martín and her brother Manel attribute to Susana part of the popularity of rhythmic at national level by noting that "[Marta Bobo was] one of the 'guilty' of publicizing rhythmic gymnastics in Spain, along with her predecessor, Susana Mendizábal". Journalist Luz Sánchez-Mellado said in an article in El País Semanal in 1993 that:

Susana Mendizábal was for a time something like the national bride. In the late seventies, when Spain was starting to emerge from the hole, this Aragonese stood in the final of the European championship and brought home a bronze that tasted like gold to the fans. Rhythmic gymnastics became a popular sport. If Susana had been able, others could.
