= Arancha Marty =

Spanish rhythmic gymnast

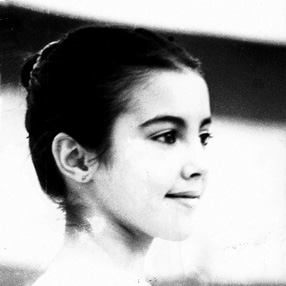

Personal information
- Full name: María Aránzazu Marty Morales
- Alternative name: Arancha Marty
- Born: 31 July 1973 (age 53) Madrid, Spain

Gymnastics career
- Discipline: Rhythmic gymnastics
- Country represented: Spain (1986-1990)
- Club: Club Moratalaz
- Head coach: Emilia Boneva
- Assistant coach: Ana Roncero
- Choreographer: Georgi Neykov
- Retired: yes
Medal record
Event	1st	2nd	3rd
Junior European Championships	0	1	0
European Championships	0	1	2
World Championships	1	2	3
FIG World Cup	0	0	3
Total	1	4	8
Rhythmic Gymnastics
Representing Spain
World Championships
Gold medal – first place	1991 Athens	All-Around
Silver medal – second place	1991 Athens	6 Ribbons
Silver medal – second place	1991 Athens	3 Balls + 3 Ropes
Bronze medal – third place	1989 Sarajevo	All-Around
Bronze medal – third place	1989 Sarajevo	12 Clubs
Bronze medal – third place	1989 Sarajevo	3 Hoops + 3 Ribbons
European Championships
Silver medal – second place	1990 Gothenburg	12 Clubs
Bronze medal – third place	1990 Gothenburg	All-Around
Bronze medal – third place	1990 Gothenburg	3 Balls + 3 Ropes
Junior European Championships
Silver medal – second place	1987 Athens	Group All-Around

María Aránzazu Marty Morales (born 31 July 1973), known as Arancha Marty, is a retired Spanish rhythmic gymnast. During her career, she won 21 medals as well as two Medals of Gymnastic Merit.

== Biography ==
Marty started gymnastics at the Moratalaz Club when she was six years old. At age nine, she entered the Madrid Technical Center, where she was coached by Goyita Postigo.

In 1986, she joined Spain's national junior rhythmic gymnastics team, where she was coached by Rosa Menor, Cathy Xaudaró and Berta Veiga. That year, she won gold in the Enna City International Tournament. In 1987, she competed at the first European Junior Championships in Athens, where she won the silver medal along with Alejandra Bolaños, Eva Martín, Carmen Martínez, Mari Carmen Moreno, Raquel Prat, Nuria Rico and Carmen Sánchez.

In 1988, she was invited by Emilia Boneva to join the national rhythmic gymnastics team of Spain as part of the group, where she would be part of the starting lineup for the next three yeears. During that time, she would train about 8 hours a day at the Moscardó Gymnasium in Madrid under the orders of Boneva herself and Ana Roncero, who since 1982 had been national team head coach and group coach respectively, with Georgi Neykov as choreographer. In addition, she would live with all the members of the team in a house in La Moraleja. That same year, she won gold both in the all-around and in an apparatus final at the Barcelona Gimnasiada. Shortly after, she won her first medal in a major competition, winning bronze with 6 balls at the European Championships in Helsinki. She took 8th place in the all-around with the rest of the group (Beatriz Barral, Vanesa Buitrago, Ana Carlota de la Fuente, Natalia Marín, Eva Martín, Mari Carmen Moreno, Raquel Prat, Astrid Sánchez and Carmen Sánchez).

At the beginning of 1989, she won three silver medals in the DTB-Pokal Karlsruhe tournament. Shortly after, she and the other members of the group (Beatriz Barral, Bito Fuster, Lorea Elso, Mari Carmen Moreno and Vanesa Muñiz, with Marta Aberturas and Nuria Arias as substitutes) won three bronze medals at the World Championships in Sarajevo. They reached the podium both in the all-around and in the two finals, 12 clubs and 3 ropes and 3 ribbons.

In 1990, the European Championships in Gotheburg took place, where she won a bronze medal in the all-around, as well as a silver in the 12 clubs final and another bronze in the 3 ropes and 3 ribbons final. In the World Cup Final, held that year in Brussels, the group (made up of Marty, Beatriz Barral, Bito Fuster, Montse Martín, Lorea Elso and Vanesa Muñiz, with Marta Aberturas and Gemma Royo as the substitutes) won all three bronze medals. At the Wacoal Cup tournament in Tokyo, held in November, they won overall silver.

In December 1990 she retired from the national team and became a team coach in different clubs. More recently, she has worked as the rhythmic gymnastics coordinator at the San José del Parque School in Madrid. Since 2016 she has been the director of infant and primary school at that school.

After Boneva's death on 20 September 2019, Arancha and other former national gymnasts gathered to pay tribute to her during the Euskalgym held on 16 November 2019. The event took place before 8,500 attendees at the Bilbao Exhibition Center de Baracaldo and was followed by a dinner in Boneva's honor.
