= Inessa Lisovskaya =

Soviet rhythmic gymnast

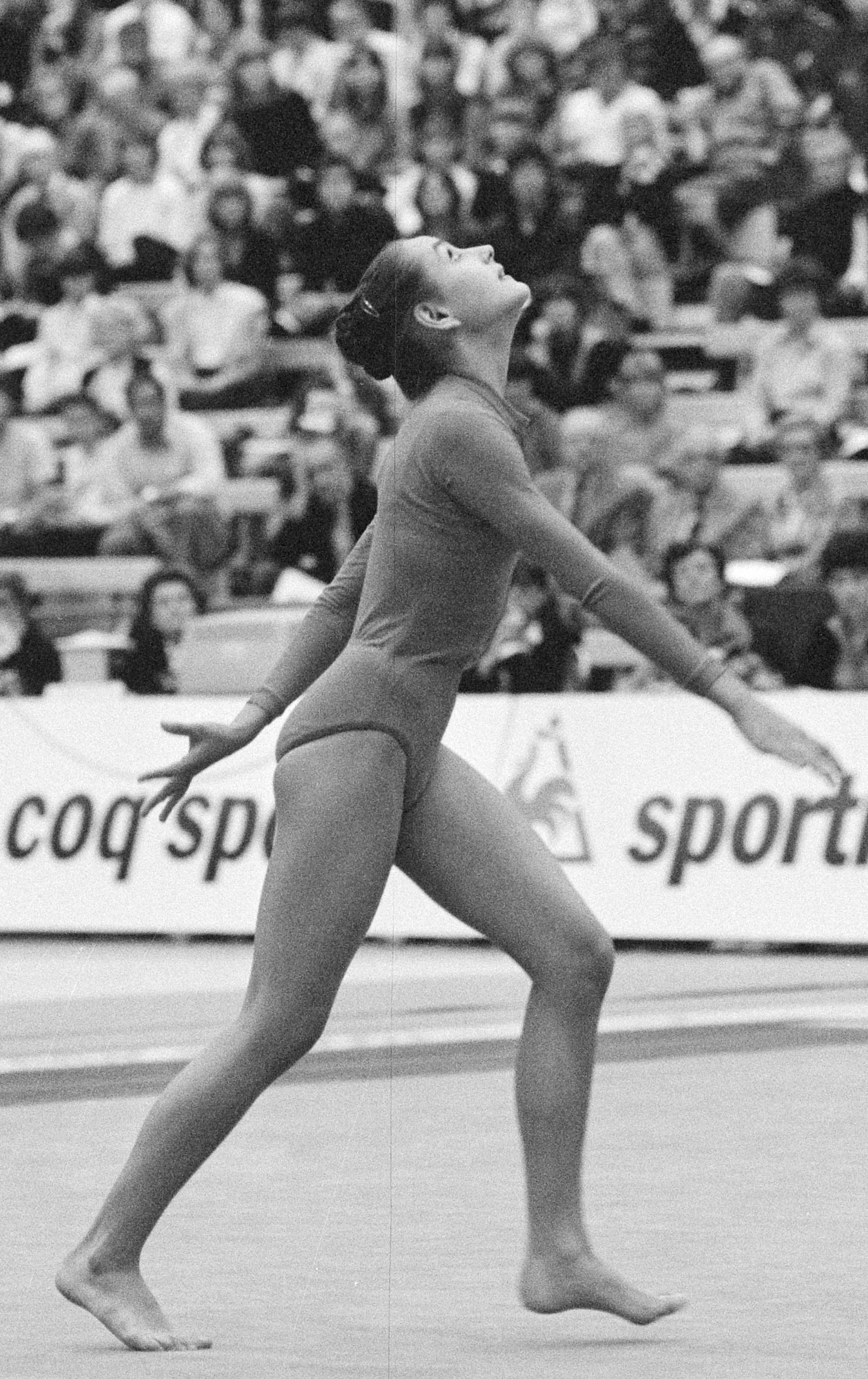
- Inessa Lisovskaya in 1980

Personal information
- Born: 1964 (age 61–62) Minsk, Belarus

Sport
- Sport: Rhythmic gymnastics
Medal record
Representing Soviet Union
Rhythmic gymnastics
World Championships
Silver medal – second place	1981 Munich	Team
European Championships
Bronze medal – third place	1980 Amsterdam	Allround
Bronze medal – third place	1980 Amsterdam	Ribbon
Bronze medal – third place	1980 Amsterdam	Clubs

Inessa Lisovskaya (also Lissovskaya; Russian: Инесса Лисовская; (Belarusian: Iнэса Лісоуская; born 1964) is a retired Soviet individual rhythmic gymnast. She won a silver medal in the team exercise at the 1981 World Championships in Munich and three bronze medals at the 1980 European Championships in Amsterdam.
