= Krasimira Vasileva =

Bulgarian rhythmic gymnast

- Красимира Василева
- Born: 9 August 1962 (age 64) Kyustendil, Bulgaria

Gymnastics career
- Discipline: Rhythmic gymnastics
- Country represented: Bulgaria (1977-1979)
- Head coach: Filka Radenkova
- Retired: yes
Medal record
Representing Bulgaria
World Championships
Silver medal – second place	1977 Basel	Group All-Around
Bronze medal – third place	1979 London	Group All-Around
European Championships
Gold medal – first place	1978 Madrid	Group All-Around

Krasimira Vasileva (born on August 9, 1962) is a former Bulgarian rhythmic gymnast. She's a world and European medalist.

== Career ==
Vasileva was born in Kyustendil, where she started training at the nearby school of rhythmic gymnastics.

In 1977, she won silver in the group competition at the World Championships. The following year, she became the first European champion in groups. And in 1979, she won group bronze at the World Championships.

For her achievements, she was awarded the title of Honoured Master of Sports in Bulgaria.
