= Marta Aberturas =

Spanish rhythmic gymnast

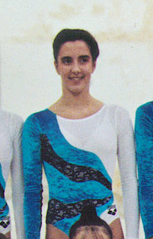

Personal information
- Full name: Marta Aberturas Rubio
- Born: 5 July 1974 (age 52) Gijón, Spain

Gymnastics career
- Discipline: Rhythmic gymnastics
- Country represented: Spain (1988-1991)
- Club: Club Escuela de Gimnasia Rítmica de Zaragoza
- Head coaches: Ana Roncero, Emilia Boneva
- Choreographer: Georgi Neykov
- Retired: yes
Medal record
Event	1st	2nd	3rd
European Championships	0	1	2
World Championships	1	2	3
FIG World Cup	0	0	3
Total	1	3	7
Rhythmic Gymnastics
Representing Spain
World Championships
Bronze medal – third place	1989 Sarajevo	All-Around
Bronze medal – third place	1989 Sarajevo	12 Clubs
Bronze medal – third place	1989 Sarajevo	3 Hoops + 3 Ribbons
Gold medal – first place	1991 Athens	All-Around
Silver medal – second place	1991 Athens	6 Ribbons
Silver medal – second place	1991 Athens	3 Balls + 3 Ropes
European Championships
Bronze medal – third place	1990 Gothenburg	All-Around
Silver medal – second place	1990 Gothenburg	12 Clubs
Bronze medal – third place	1990 Gothenburg	3 Balls + 3 Ropes

Marta Aberturas Rubio (born 5 July 1974) is a former Spanish rhythmic gymnast. She was World champion in 1991 with the rest of the Spanish group, in addition to achieving numerous other medals with the Spanish national rhythmic gymnastics team. The generation of gymnasts that she joined is known by the nickname of the First Golden Girls.

== Personal life ==
Aberturas was born in Gijón in 1974, but she moved to Zaragoza in 1981. She began rhythmic gymnastics at the Club Escuela de Gimnasia Rítmica de Zaragoza. In August 1988 she was invited by Emilia Boneva to join the national rhythmic gymnastics team of Spain, of which she would be a part until 1991.

== Career ==
During the time in which she was a member of the group, she would train about 8 hours a day at the Moscardó Gymnasium in Madrid under the direction of Boneva herself along with that of Ana Roncero, who since 1982 had been national group coach and head coach. She would also live with all the members of the team in a house in La Moraleja. She was a substitute gymnast for the team at most competitions during that time, although she participated in some exhibitions in Spanish cities during the preseason and competed in international tournaments such as Karlsruhe.

At the beginning of 1989, she won three silver medals in the DTB-Pokal Karlsruhe tournament. Shortly thereafter, as a substitute gymnast, she won three bronze medals at the Sarajevo World Championships. The group reached the podium both in the all-around and in the two finals, 12 clubs and 3 ropes and 3 ribbons. These medals were won together with other group members Beatriz Barral, Lorea Elso, Bito Fuster, Arancha Marty, Mari Carmen Moreno and Vanesa Muñiz, with Nuria Arias being the other substitute. In December 1989, again as a substitute, she won all-around bronze in the Wacoal Cup in Japan.

In April 1990, she participated as a headliner in an exhibition of the group on the occasion of the inauguration of the Príncipe Felipe Pavilion in Zaragoza. Again as a substitute for the team, she competed in the European Championships in Gothenburg. She won a bronze medal in the all-around, as well as a silver in the 12 clubs final and another bronze in the 3 ropes and 3 ribbons final. At the World Cup final in Brussels, she won all three bronze medals, one for each final. The other members of the group there were Beatriz Barral, Lorea Elso, Bito Fuster, Montse Martín, Arancha Marty and Vanesa Muñiz, with Gemma Royo as the other substitute gymnast. Débora Alonso and Cristina Chapuli were also part of the team, but they were not entered in any competitions that year. In the Wacoal Cup tournament in Tokyo, held in November, they won the all-around silver medal.

In 1991, the two exercises for groups were 6 ribbons for the single-apparatus exercise and 3 balls and 3 ropes for the mixed-apparatus one. Their ribbon exercise used "Tango Jalousie", composed by Jacob Gade, for the music, while their mixed-apparatus one used the song "Campanas" by Víctor Bombi. To choreograph the dance steps of the 6 ribbons exercise, they had the help of Javier "Poty" Castillo, then a dancer with the National Ballet, although the team's usual choreographer was the Bulgarian Georgi Neykov. Prior to the World Cup, they won gold at the Karlsruhe tournament (ahead of the USSR and Bulgaria) and three bronzes at the Gymnastic Masters in Stuttgart, both in Germany.

Throughout the year 1991, she was a substitute gymnast for the group. On October 12 of that year, the Spanish group won the gold medal in the all-around of the World Championship in Athens. This medal was described by the media as historic, since it was the first time that Spain had won the World Championships in rhythmic gymnastics. On the first day of the all-around, they achieved a score of 19.500 in the exercise with 3 balls and 3 ropes, while on the following day, with their 6 ribbons performance, they obtained a mark of 19.350 (9.90 in composition and 9.45 for execution). With a total score of 38.850, the Spanish team managed to beat the USSR team by 50 thousandths, while North Korea won bronze. The next day, they would also be silver medalists in the two apparatus finals, the 6 ribbon and the 3 balls and 3 ropes finals.

As in the rest of the competition, Aberturas was a substitute gymnast in both exercises. These medals were achieved together with Débora Alonso, Lorea Elso, Bito Fuster, Isabel Gómez, Montse Martín and Gemma Royo, in addition to Cristina Chapuli as the other substitute. The winning of these would be narrated for Spain through La 2 de TVE by the journalist Paloma del Río. After this achievement, at the end of 1991 they would tour Switzerland.

She retired in 1991 after the World Championships in Athens. In 1992, she was awarded the Medal of Sports Merit from the Diputación General de Aragón, along with her former teammate Gemma Royo.

== Legacy and influence ==
The national rhythmic gymnastics group of 1991 won the first world title for Spanish rhythmic gymnastics at the World Championships in Athens. It was the first time a rhythmic gymnastics team from a Western country had prevailed over those from Eastern European countries. Reviews of this milestone appear in books such as Gimnasia rítmica deportiva: aspectos y evolución (1995) by Aurora Fernández del Valle, Enredando en la memoria (2015) by Paloma del Río, and Pinceladas de rítmica (2017) by Montse and Manel Martín.
