= Irina Devina =

Soviet rhythmic gymnast (born 1959)

- Born: 8 May 1959 (age 67) Zhukovsky, Moscow Oblast Russia SSR, Soviet Union

Gymnastics career
- Discipline: Rhythmic gymnastics
- Country represented: Soviet Union
- Head coach: Nina Shibaeva
- Retired: yes
Medal record
Representing Soviet Union
Rhythmic gymnastics
World Championships
Gold medal – first place	1977 Basel	Group all-around
Gold medal – first place	1979 London	Group all-around
Gold medal – first place	1981 Munich	Ribbon
Bronze medal – third place	1981 Munich	Clubs
European Championships
Silver medal – second place	1982 Stavanger	Rope
Bronze medal – third place	1982 Stavanger	Clubs
Bronze medal – third place	1982 Stavanger	Hoop
World Cup Final
Bronze medal – third place	1983 Belgrade	Ribbon
Bronze medal – third place	1983 Belgrade	Hoop
USSR Championships
Gold medal – first place	1981 Kiev	All-around
Gold medal – first place	1981 Kiev	Hoop
Gold medal – first place	1981 Kiev	Clubs
Gold medal – first place	1982 Tallinn	Hoop
Gold medal – first place	1982 Tallinn	Clubs
Silver medal – second place	1981 Kiev	Ribbon
Silver medal – second place	1982 Tallinn	All-around
Silver medal – second place	1982 Tallinn	Ribbon
Bronze medal – third place	1982 Tallinn	Rope

Irina Devina (Russian: Ирина Девина; born 8 May 1959 in Zhukovsky, Moscow Oblast Russia SSR, Soviet Union) is retired Soviet rhythmic gymnast who has competed both as an individual and in group. She is a (1979, 1977) World Champion in Group all-around and won the 1981 USSR Championships in all-around.

== Career ==
Devina was an elegant and technical gymnast who started gymnastics at 6 years of age. She is twice World Champion as member the Soviet group that won the all-around gold in 1977 and 1979 (in Basel and London).

She began competing as an individual at the beginning of the 1980s, a time of the uprise and domination of the Golden Girls of Bulgaria of her generation (Iliana Raeva, Anelia Ralenkova, Lilia Ignatova, Diliana Gueorguieva) limiting her competitive victories, nevertheless Devina won gold in ribbon at the 1981 World Championships and finished 4th in all-around, the highest ranked Soviet. She also came in 4th in all-around at the 1982 Europeans. In 1983, Devina competed with teammate Dalia Kutkaitė at the inaugural World Cup Final held in Belgrade, she took two bronze medals in hoop and ribbon.

Devina won the 1981 USSR Championships in all-around ahead of silver medalist Venera Zaripova, she also won the all-around silver at the 1982 USSR Championships held in Tallinn behind Dalia Kutkaitė.

After completing her competitive career, Devina married famous Soviet Olympic Pentathlon athlete, Vasily Neffedov. She now lives in Moscow, Russia and briefly taught as a coach being a holder of Honored Master of Sports of the USSR.

== Influence ==
Devina was the first rhythmic gymnast to perform a penché pivot turn.
