= María José Rodríguez =

Spanish rhythmic gymnast

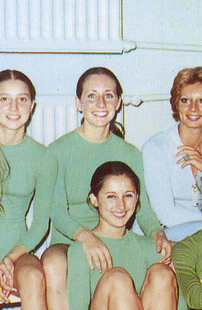

Personal information
- Full name: María José Rodríguez Barahona
- Born: 21 March 1958 (age 68) Logroño, Spain

Gymnastics career
- Discipline: Rhythmic gymnastics
- Country represented: Spain (1974-1976)
- Head coach: Ivanka Chakarova
- Retired: yes
Medal record
Rhythmic Gymnastics
Representing Spain
World Championships
Bronze medal – third place	1975 Madrid	Group All-Around

María José Rodríguez (born 21 March 1958) is a former Spanish rhythmic gymnast. She won a bronze medal at Worlds in 1975.

== Career ==
She was part of the first national rhythmic gymnastics team in Spain, created by the Spanish Gymnastics Federation in 1974. She became a member of the senior group. The team coach was the Bulgarian Ivanka Chakarova, with the help of Carmen Algora. At first they trained in the gym of the Consejo Superior de Deportes, where there was no carpet, and later they went to the Moscardó Gymnasium in Madrid. Towards June 1975 she traveled with the national team to Bulgaria for a two-month training camp in Sofia and Varna.

On November 24, 1975, at the World Championships in Madrid, the group won the bronze medal in the All-Around, being the first official international medal for the Spanish group. The exercise they performed was 3 balls and 3 ropes, and the team was made up of María José, Leticia Herrería, Carmen Lorca, Herminia Mata, María Eugenia Rodríguez and Marilín Such, in addition to Teresa López, Mercedes Trullols and Cathy Xaudaró as substitutes. Although the start of the competition was initially scheduled for November 20, it had to be delayed due to the death of Francisco Franco. Maria José retired as a gymnast in 1976.

In 1976 she graduated in Physical Education from the Complutense University of Madrid and became a national trainer and national and international judge of rhythmic gymnastics, a profession she would practice until 2000. From 1976 to 1982, María José was a member of the National Technical Committee for rhythmic gymnastics and coach of the national team's individuals helped by Ivanka Chakarova in 1980 and 1981, training gymnasts like Susana Mendizábal. She was also founder and technical director of the Rioja Gymnastics Federation from 1984 to 1992. That same year she would participate as an international judge in the Olympic Games in Barcelona.

In November 1982 she began working as a teacher at the Municipal Rhythmic Gymnastics School in Logroño, from 1984 to the present she held positions such as manager responsible for Sports Facilities and Promotion, technical director of the Logroño Deporte Municipal Company ( 2004 - 2009), or executive director of said company (2009 - 2013). Currently she works as an Institutional Relations and Protocol Manager for the Logroño City Council. She is also a director of the City of Logroño Handball Club since 2014.
