= Elena Bukreeva =

Soviet gymnast

- Елена Константиновна Букреева
- Full name: Elena Konstantinovna Bukreeva
- Born: 14 August 1965 (age 61)

Gymnastics career
- Discipline: Rhythmic gymnastics
- Country represented: Soviet Union (1979-1983)
- Retired: yes
Medal record
Representing Soviet Union
World Cup Final
Gold medal – first place	1983 Belgrade	Group All-Around
European Championships
Gold medal – first place	1982 Stavanger	All-around

Elena Bukreeva (born 14 August 1965) is a retired Soviet gymnast and TV presenter. Honored Master of Sports of the USSR in rhythmic gymnastics. She was the host of a series of television programs “Rhythmic Gymnastics”.

== Biography ==
From the age of 11 she was competed in rhythmic gymnastics and was one of the representatives of the Soviet national team. Since 1979, she competed in the national group together with T. Vorotyntseva, S. Guseva, S. Kudinova, N. Kurochkina and O. Rodionova. Journalists of the newspaper “Soviet Sport” once called their team the “magnificent six.”

In 1982 the girls won gold at the European Championships in Stavanger. In 1983, at the first Rhythmic Gymnastics World Cup in Belgrade, they became the group All-Around champions.

When in the 1980s, the Main Editorial Board of Central Television decided to popularize television sports programs, they recruited a group of attractive, athletic girls to record several episodes of a set of physical exercises. Bukreeva became one of the TV presenters of this program, she hosted the third (March–April 1985) and sixth (October–December 1986) editions.
