= Nancy Usero =

Spanish rhythmic gymnast

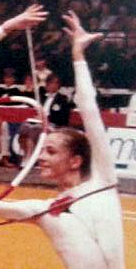
- Full name: Nancy Usero Til
- Born: Zaragoza, Spain

Gymnastics career
- Discipline: Rhythmic gymnastics
- Country represented: Spain (1981-1986)
- Club: Escuela de Gimnasia Rítmica de Zaragoza
- Head coach: Emilia Boneva
- Retired: yes
Medal record
Representing Spain
European Championships
Bronze medal – third place	1984 Vienna	Group All-Around

Nancy Usero is a retired Spanish rhythmic gymnast, member of the national group. She was also national head coach from 1998 to 2001.

== Biography ==
Usero took up the sport at Escuela de Gimnasia Rítmica of Zaragoza. In 1982 she won bronze in the 2nd category of the Spanish Championships in Palencia. She became part of the Spanish national group, she would train at the Moscardó Gymnasium in Madrid under the orders of the national team coach Emilia Boneva and the group coach, Ana Roncero, Georgi Neykov was the team's choreographer. In 1984 she won the bronze medal in the all-around competition at the European Championships in Vienna along Pilar Domenech, María Fernández, Virginia Manzanera, Eva Obalat and Graciela Yanes, with Rocío Ducay and Ofelia Rodríguez as substitutes. After this achievement, they were all awarded the Medal of Gymnastic Merit of 1984 from the Royal Spanish Gymnastics Federation that was given to them in 1985 in a ceremony presided over by Alfonso de Borbón y Dampierre, Duke of Cádiz, then president of the COE.

At the 1985 World Championships in Valladolid the group was 7th in the All-Around along Pilar Domenech, Eva Obalat, Ofelia Rodríguez, María Fernández and Graciela Yanes, in addition to Ester Domínguez, Rocío Ducay, Laura Manzanera and Estela Martín as substitutes.

After her retirement, she served as technical director of the Aragonese Gymnastics Federation and prepared gymnasts at her childhood club, eventually training Esther Domínguez from 1994 until she was called by the individuals national coach Mar Lozano.

In 1997, Nancy was selected as head of the national junior group. In September 1998, she was named national head coach for groups, replacing María Fernández Ostolaza. She had Dalia Kutkaite as assistant and coach of the junior group, and Cristina Álvarez as choreographer the first year. During 1999 and 2000, the two exercises were with 3 ribbons and 2 hoops and the one with 10 clubs, in the first they used "Zorongo gitano" and "Babelia" by Chano Domínguez, Hozan Yamamoto and Javier Paxariño for the second, as music during 1999. That year the group was made up of Sara Bayón, Marta Calamonte, Lorena Guréndez, Carolina Malchair, Beatriz Nogalez and Paula Orive. At the end of May at the European Championships in Budapest, they were 7th in the All-Around, due to a poor score in the 10 clubs exercise. In the 3 ribbons and 2 hoops competition they won the bronze medal. In August the team won the silver medal in the mixed event at the DTB-Pokal in Bochum. At the end of September at the World Championships in Osaka they were 7th overall competition, which gave them qualification for the Sydney Olympic Games the following year. Subsequently, they took 6th place in both event finals.

In 2000 they had two new routines, now with music by Los Activos and Vicente Amigo and, for the 10 clubs exercise, with a medley by The Corrs and Loreena McKennitt. The Spanish team, made up of Igone Arribas, Marta Calamonte, Lorena Guréndez, Carolina Malchair, Beatriz Nogalez and Carmina Verdú, had the opportunity to revalidate the gold medal won four years before in Atlanta in the same competition. However, a series of errors in the execution of the two exercises, such as a knot in a ribbon and two falls of clubs, caused the Spanish group to be placed in the 10th and last position in the qualification phase, therefore who could not participate in the final.

In October 2000 Nancy Usero was renewed as head coach, position she would keep until March 2001, date on which she was replaced by Nina Vitrichenko, who would be the head coach between March and September of that year.

After Boneva's death on 20 September 2019, Nancy and other former national gymnasts gathered to pay tribute to her during the Euskalgym held on 16 November 2019. The event took place before 8,500 attendees at the Bilbao Exhibition Center de Baracaldo and was followed by a dinner in Boneva's honor.

== Legacy and influence ==
The bronze medal at the European Championships in Vienna in 1984 was the first for the Spanish group since 1975, and then began a long period of winning international medals. In an interview in 2016, María Fernández highlighted the importance of that medal for Spanish rhythmic gymnastics:

At that time, what we wanted was to overthrow the Eastern countries [...] As the medals were always Russia, Bulgaria and Czechoslovakia, ours was a great milestone and the bronze in the European Championship was indeed a feat for the team . It was the start of something.
