= Mari Carmen Moreno =

Spanish rhythmic gymnast

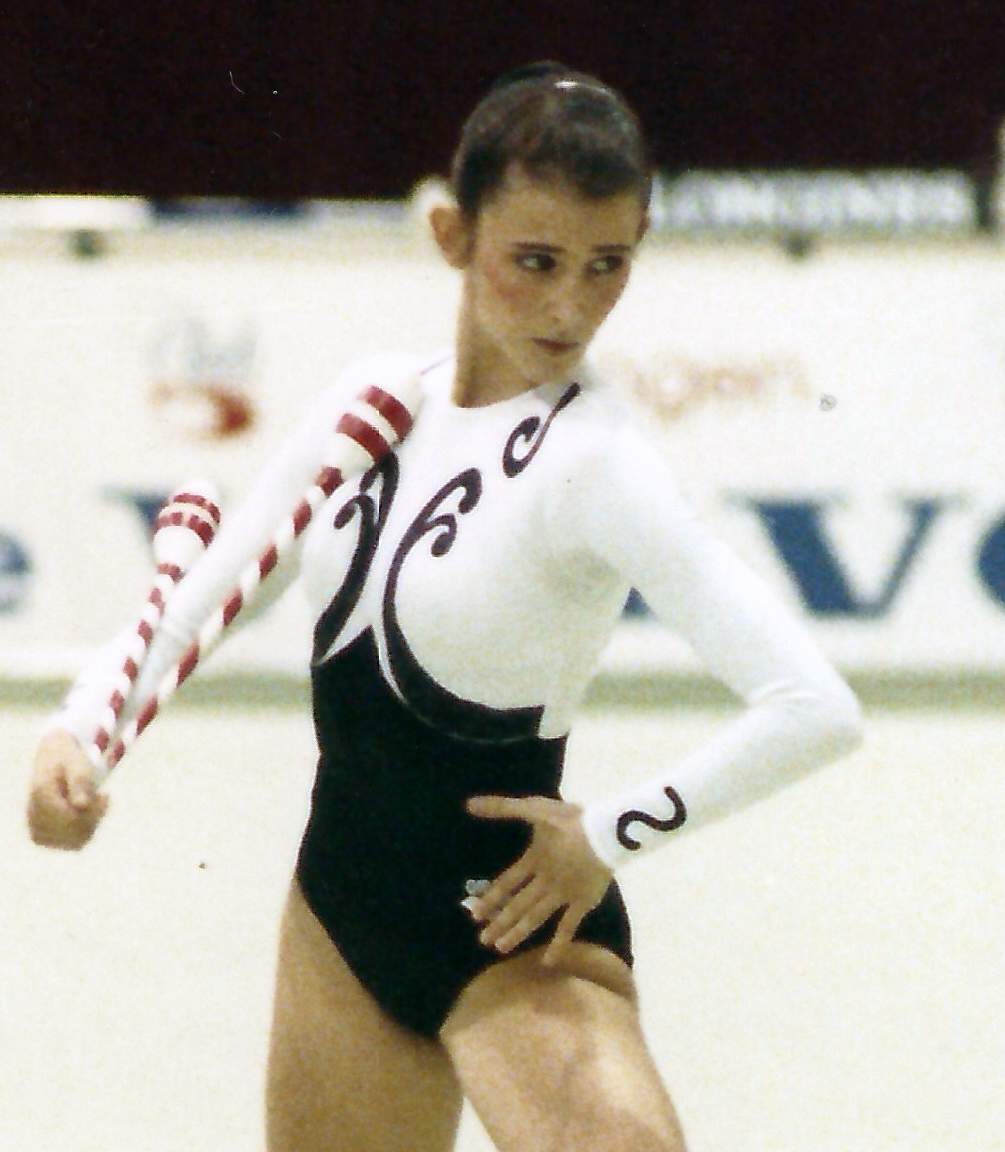

Personal information
- Full name: María Carmen Moreno Bellido
- Alternative name: Nito Moreno
- Born: 16 July 1972 (age 54) Alicante, Spain

Gymnastics career
- Discipline: Rhythmic gymnastics
- Country represented: Spain (1986-1989)
- Club: Club Jitte
- Head coach: Emilia Boneva
- Assistant coach: Ana Roncero
- Choreographer: Georgi Neykov
- Retired: yes
Medal record
Event	1st	2nd	3rd
Junior European Championships	0	1	0
European Championships	0	0	1
World Championships	0	0	5
Total	0	1	6
Rhythmic Gymnastics
Representing Spain
World Championships
Bronze medal – third place	1987 Varna	Group All-Around
Bronze medal – third place	1987 Varna	3 Hoops + 3 Balls
Bronze medal – third place	1989 Sarajevo	All-Around
Bronze medal – third place	1989 Sarajevo	12 Clubs
Bronze medal – third place	1989 Sarajevo	3 Hoops + 3 Ribbons
European Championships
Bronze medal – third place	1988 Helsinki	6 Balls
Junior European Championships
Silver medal – second place	1987 Athens	Group All-Around

María Carmen Moreno Bellido (born 16 July 1972), better known as Mari Carmen Moreno or Nito Moreno is a retired Spanish rhythmic gymnast and coach. During her sporting career she won a total of 7 official international medals as well as a Medal of Gymnastic Merit and the Baron de Güell Cup.

== Biography ==
Mari started her sports career with 8 years in the Club Jitte, when her teacher physical education teacher at school, Paqui Maneus, saw her talent. It was Paqui Maneus who trained her in Alicante until in 1987 she was called up by the national team.

In 1986, she joined Spain's national junior rhythmic gymnastics team, where she was coached by Rosa Menor, Cathy Xaudaró and Berta Veiga. That year, she won gold in the Enna City International Tournament. In 1987, she competed at the first European Junior Championships in Athens, where she won the silver medal along with Alejandra Bolaños, Eva Martín, Carmen Martínez, Arancha Marty, Raquel Prat, Nuria Rico and Carmen Sánchez.

In late 1987 she was invited by Emilia Boneva to join the senior national team as part of the group, where she would be part of the starting lineup for the next two years. During that time, she would train about 8 hours a day at the Moscardó Gymnasium in Madrid under the orders of Boneva herself and Ana Roncero, who since 1982 had been national team head coach and group coach respectively, with Georgi Neykov as choreographer. In addition, she would live with all the members of the team in a house in La Moraleja. Shortly after, she won her first medal in a major competition getting two bronze medals in the All-Around and with 3 hoop & 3 balls along Marisa Centeno, Natalia Marín, Ana Martínez, Marta Pardós, Astrid Sánchez, Elena Velasco with Ana Carlota de la Fuente and Ana Martínez as substitutes, at the World Championships in Varna.

A year later, she won gold both in the all-around and in an apparatus final at the Barcelona Gimnasiada. Later she won bronze with 6 balls at the European Championships in Helsinki. She took 8th place in the all-around with the rest of the group (Beatriz Barral, Vanesa Buitrago, Ana Carlota de la Fuente, Natalia Marín, Eva Martín, Arancha Marty, Raquel Prat, Astrid Sánchez and Carmen Sánchez).

At the beginning of 1989, she won three silver medals in the DTB-Pokal Karlsruhe tournament. Shortly after, she and the other members of the group (Beatriz Barral, Bito Fuster, Lorea Elso, Arancha Marty and Vanesa Muñiz, with Marta Aberturas and Nuria Arias as substitutes) won three bronze medals at the World Championships in Sarajevo. They reached the podium both in the all-around and in the two finals, 12 clubs and 3 ropes and 3 ribbons. At the end of the year she won All-Around bronza at the Wacoal Cup in Japan, her last competition with the national team.

After her retirement in December 1989 she became a coach, training the Torrevieja Rhythmic Gymnastics Club since October 1991. There she integrated the coaching stuff with other former national team members such as Monica Ferrández and Jennifer Colino. Mari Carmen has trained gymnasts such as Claudia Heredia, who became part of the national senior group, or national and regional medalists Tyler Brumitt and Blanca Tomás, who is also her daughter. Blanca, for her rope routine during la Liga Iberdrola, used a leotard that Mari Carmen wore during the World Championships in Sarajevo.

After Boneva's death on 20 September 2019, Mari and other former national gymnasts gathered to pay tribute to her during the Euskalgym held on 16 November 2019. The event took place before 8,500 attendees at the Bilbao Exhibition Center de Baracaldo and was followed by a dinner in Boneva's honor.
