= Vanesa Muñiz =

Spanish former rhythmic gymnast

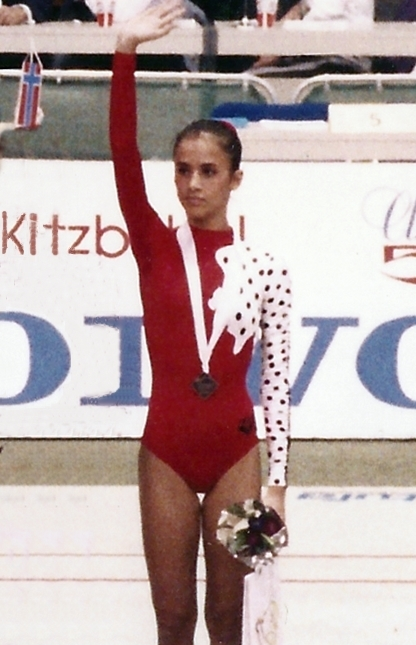

Personal information
- Full name: Vanesa Muñiz Rubio
- Born: 18 July 1975 (age 51) Alicante, Spain

Gymnastics career
- Discipline: Rhythmic gymnastics
- Country represented: Spain; (1989-1990)
- Club: Club Atlético Montemar
- Head coaches: Ana Roncero, Emilia Boneva
- Choreographer: Georgi Neykov
- Retired: yes
Medal record
Event	1st	2nd	3rd
European Championships	0	1	2
World Championships	0	0	3
FIG World Cup	0	0	3
Total	0	1	7
Rhythmic Gymnastics
Representing Spain
World Championships
Bronze medal – third place	1989 Sarajevo	All-Around
Bronze medal – third place	1989 Sarajevo	12 Clubs
Bronze medal – third place	1989 Sarajevo	3 Hoops + 3 Ribbons
European Championships
Bronze medal – third place	1990 Gothenburg	All-Around
Silver medal – second place	1990 Gothenburg	12 Clubs
Bronze medal – third place	1990 Gothenburg	3 Balls + 3 Ropes

Vanesa Muñiz Rubio (born 18 July 1975) is a retired Spanish rhythmic gymnast. During her time in the national team she won 9 international medals.

== Biography ==
Vanesa started her sports career at Club Atlético Montemar in Alicante. In 1989 Emilia Boneva selected her to be part of the national senior group, where she remained a starter for the next two years. During that time she would train about 8 hours a day at the Moscardó Gymnasium in Madrid under the orders of Boneva herself and Ana Roncero, who since 1982 had been the national team head coach and group coach respectively, Georgi Neykov was the choreographer. In addition, she would live with all the members of the team in a house in La Moraleja.

At the beginning of 1989, she won three silver medals in the DTB-Pokal Karlsruhe tournament. Shortly after, she and the other members of the group (Beatriz Barral, Bito Fuster, Arancha Marty, Mari Carmen Moreno and Lorea Elso, with Marta Aberturas and Nuria Arias as the substitutes) won three bronze medals at the World Championships in Sarajevo. They reached the podium both in the all-around and in the two finals, 12 clubs and 3 ropes and 3 ribbons.

In 1990, the European Championships in Gotheburg took place, where she won a bronze medal in the all-around, as well as a silver in the 12 clubs final and another bronze in the 3 ropes and 3 ribbons final. At the World Cup Final, held that year in Brussels, the group (made up of Elso, Beatriz Barral, Bito Fuster, Montse Martín, Arancha Marty and Lorea Elso, with Marta Aberturas and Gemma Royo as the substitutes) won all three bronze medals. At the Wacoal Cup tournament in Tokyo, held in November, they won overall silver.

At the end of 1990 Muñiz retired from the national team. She holds the title of national rhythmic gymnastics coach and judge, and in 1998 she graduated in biology from the University of Alicante. In addition, she has experience in sports management, creating the municipal sports school of rhythmic gymnastics in Benissa in 1998, and in reception of the covered swimming pool of the provincial home of Alicante, both working for the defunct GESTKAL XXI S.L. and subsequently managing comprehensive services for SERVOGESTION S.L. in the administration area. She later worked in the customer service area of the Villajoyosa Indoor Pool, in addition to being an administrator since 2017 in an ultraviolet light disinfection company. Since January 2000 she has been a coach at the ECA Club of Alicante, managing to reach several Spanish championships, and where she is a coach along with former national gymnasts Rosabel Espinosa and Natalia Marín.

In September 2018, she traveled with several former gymnasts from the Spanish team to the World Championships in Sofia to meet again with the former national team coach Emilia Boneva, and a tribute dinner was also organized in Boneva's honor. After Boneva's death on 20 September 2019, Vanesa and other former national gymnasts gathered to pay tribute to her during the Euskalgym held on 16 November 2019. The event took place before 8,500 attendees at the Bilbao Exhibition Center de Baracaldo and was followed by a dinner in Boneva's honor.
