= Graciela Yanes =

Spanish rhythmic gymnast

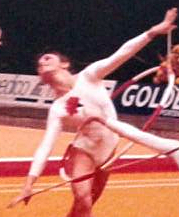

Personal information
- Full name: Graciela Yanes Ojeda
- Born: 10 September 1965 (age 60) Tenerife, Spain

Gymnastics career
- Discipline: Rhythmic gymnastics
- Country represented: Spain (1984-1985)
- Club: Club Avia
- Head coach: Emilia Boneva
- Retired: yes
Medal record
Representing Spain
European Championships
Bronze medal – third place	1984 Vienna	Group All-Around

Graciela Yanes Ojeda (born 10 September 1965) is retired Spanish rhythmic gymnast and coach. She represented Spain as part of the senior group.

== Biography ==
Yanes took up rhythmic gymnastics at the age of 13 at her high school, initially as a group member. Shortly after, she moved on to train at the Avia Club, training under Nelva Estévez. Then, with Margarita Tomova as her coach, she was chosen to be an individual gymnast, and in December 1983 she won silver in the 2nd category at the Spanish Championships held in Malaga.

In mid 1984 she joined the national rhythmic gymnastics team, there she trained at the Moscardó Gymnasium in Madrid under the orders of Emilia Boneva and the group coach, Ana Roncero. Georgi Neykov was the team's choreographer and Violeta Portaska was the pianist in charge of providing live music for the routines. In November she was part of the Spanish group that won bronze at the European Championship in Vienna. The members of the group were Graciela, Pilar Domenech, Virginia Manzanera, Eva Obalat, Nancy Usero and María Fernández Ostolaza, in addition to Rocío Ducay and Ofelia Rodríguez as substitutes. After this achievement, they were all awarded the Medal of Gymnastic Merit of 1984 from the Royal Spanish Gymnastics Federation that was given to them in 1985 in a ceremony presided over by Alfonso de Borbón y Dampierre, Duke of Cádiz, then president of the COE.

At the 1985 World Championships in Valladolid the group made of Yanes, Pilar Domenech, Eva Obalat, Ofelia Rodríguez, Nancy Usero and María Fernández Ostolaza (in addition to Esther Domínguez, Rocío Ducay, Laura Manzanera and Estela Martín as substitutes), was 7th in the All-Around.

After her retirement she worked as a coach for the USA's national group in the pre-Olympic cycle for Atlanta 1996, before giving the position to a Bulgarian trainer. Later she worked at the Club Odisea Tenerife. As of 2021 she coaches at the Batistana Club, where her daughter Daniela Simancas is a first team gymnast.

== Legacy and influence ==
The bronze medal at the European Championships in Vienna in 1984 was the first for the Spanish group since 1975, and then began a long period of winning international medals. In an interview in 2016, María Fernández Ostolaza highlighted the importance of that medal for Spanish rhythmic gymnastics:

At that time, what we wanted was to overthrow the Eastern countries [...] As the medals were always Russia, Bulgaria and Czechoslovakia, ours was a great milestone and the bronze in the European Championship was indeed a feat for the team . It was the start of something.
