= Cathy Xaudaró =

Spanish former rhythmic gymnast

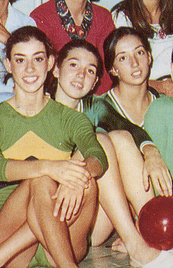

Personal information
- Full name: Catherine Xaudaró Apellániz
- Born: 30 April 1960 (age 66) Iloílo, Philippines

Gymnastics career
- Discipline: Rhythmic gymnastics
- Country represented: Spain (1974-1978)
- Head coach: Ivanka Chakarova
- Retired: yes
Medal record
Rhythmic Gymnastics
Representing Spain
World Championships
Bronze medal – third place	1975 Madrid	Group All-Around

Catherine Xaudaró Apellániz (born 30 April 1960) is a Spanish former rhythmic gymnast. She won a bronze medal at Worlds in 1975.

== Career ==
Although she was born in the Philippines, due to martial law around 1970 she moved with her family to live in Spain. Initially, after being discovered by Carmen Algora, she began practicing artistic gymnastics in the gymnastics section of the Real Madrid Football Club. In 1973 he moved with his coach to practice rhythmic gymnastics at the Club Cuartel de la Montaña. This, together with Club Moscardó, were the only two gymnastics clubs in Madrid at the time.

Xaudaró was part of the first national rhythmic gymnastics team in Spain, created by the Spanish Gymnastics Federation in 1974. She became a member of the senior group. The team coach was the Bulgarian Ivanka Chakarova, with the help of Carmen Algora. At first they trained in the gym of the Consejo Superior de Deportes, where there was no carpet, and later they went to the Moscardó Gymnasium in Madrid. Towards June 1975 she traveled with the national team to Bulgaria for a two-month training camp in Sofia and Varna.

On 24 November 1975, at the World Championships in Madrid, the group won the bronze medal in the All-Around, being the first official international medal for the Spanish group. The exercise they performed was 3 balls and 3 ropes, and the team was made up of María José Rodríguez, Carmen Lorca, Herminia Mata, María Eugenia Rodríguez and Marilín Such, in addition to Teresa López, Mercedes Trullols and Cathy as substitutes. Although the start of the competition was initially scheduled for 20 November, it had to be delayed due to the death of Francisco Franco. An injury in 1978 made her retire.

After her retirement, in 1978 she began training a group of young girls at the proposal of the national coach. Soon after she became a national rhythmic gymnastics coach, working at the Zaragozano Sports Club of Gymnastics in Zaragoza. There she trained Ada Liberio, who would later become a famous gymnast. In 1981 she was assistant coach of the Spanish national team at the World Championship in Munich. In 1987 she was one of the coaches, with Rosa Menor and Berta Veiga, of the junior national team at the European Championships in Athens. In 1989 she left the Zaragozano Sports Club to go to the Aragonese Gymnastics Federation. That same year she again coached the national junior team, this time with Rosa Menor, Francisca Maneus and Berta Veiga. Also in 1989, she worked with the national artistic gymnastics team, with which she prepared the floor exercises until the 1992 Olympic Games.

In 1994, together with Consuelo Burgos, she returned to train the national junior team, where she discovered gymnasts such as Nuria Cabanillas or Alba Caride. From 1995 to 2005, she coached at the Las Rozas Rhythmic Gymnastics Club, she was assistant to Spanish national coach Efrossina Angelova from 2009 to 2010.

Xaudaró is also an international judge of rhythmic gymnastics since 1985, having been a judge representing the Madrid Federation in several Spanish Championships. She is currently a member of the Technical Commission of Rhythmic Gymnastics of the Royal Spanish Federation of Gymnastics.
