= Maya Georgieva (gymnast) =

Bulgarian rhythmic gymnast

- Мая Георгиева
- Born: 10 October 1962 (age 63) Kyustendil, Bulgaria

Gymnastics career
- Discipline: Rhythmic gymnastics
- Country represented: Bulgaria (1977-1979)
- Head coach: Filka Radenkova
- Retired: yes
Medal record
Representing Bulgaria
World Championships
Silver medal – second place	1977 Basel	Group All-Around
Bronze medal – third place	1979 London	Group All-Around
European Championships
Gold medal – first place	1978 Madrid	Group All-Around

Maya Georgieva (born 10 October 1962) is a former Bulgarian rhythmic gymnast. She's a World and European medalist.

== Biography ==
Georgieva was born in Kyustendil, where she began training at the local school of rhythmic gymnastics.

In 1977 she won silver in the group competition at the World Championships. The following year she became the first European champion in groups. And in 1979 she won group bronze at the World Championships.

For her achievements she was awarded the title of Honoured Master of Sports in Bulgaria.
