= 1986 Rhythmic Gymnastics European Championships =

- Location: Florence, Italy
- Start date: 18 September 1986
- End date: 21 September 1986

The 1986 Rhythmic Gymnastics European Championships was the 5th edition of the Rhythmic Gymnastics European Championships, which took place from 18 September 1986 to 21 September 1986 in Florence, Italy.

24 countries entered gymnasts, and 66 individual gymnasts competed.

== Medal winners ==
Event	Gold	Silver	Bronze
Individual
All-Around	Lilia Ignatova; Bulgaria; Bianka Panova; Bulgaria	none awarded	Galina Beloglazova; Soviet Union
Rope	Lilia Ignatova; Bulgaria; Bianka Panova; Bulgaria	none awarded	Marina Lobatch; Soviet Union
Ball	Tatiana Druchinina; Soviet Union; Adriana Dunavska; Bulgaria; Galina Beloglazova; Soviet Union	none awarded	none awarded
Clubs	Lilia Ignatova; Bulgaria; Bianka Panova; Bulgaria	none awarded	Galina Beloglazova; Soviet Union
Ribbon	Galina Beloglazova; Soviet Union	Lilia Ignatova; Bulgaria; Bianka Panova; Bulgaria	none awarded
Groups
All-Around	Bulgaria	Soviet Union; Janika Mölder	Spain; Marisa Centeno; Natalia Marín; Estela Martín; Eva Obalat; Ana Martínez; Elena Velasco

== Medal table ==
Rank	Nation	Gold	Silver	Bronze	Total
1	Bulgaria (BUL)	8	2	0	10
2	Soviet Union (URS)	3	1	3	7
3	Spain (ESP)	0	0	1	1
Totals (3 entries)		11	3	4	18
