= 1987 Rhythmic Gymnastics Junior European Championships =

Gymnastics European competition

- Location: Athens, Greece
- Start date: 7 May 1987
- End date: 10 May 1987

The 1987 Rhythmic Gymnastics Junior European Championships is the 1st edition of the Rhythmic Gymnastics Junior European Championships, which took place from 7 May 1987 to 10 May 1987 in Athens, Greece.

== Medal winners ==
Event	Gold	Silver	Bronze
Individual
All-Around	Elizabeth Koleva; Bulgaria	Albene Dimitrova; Bulgaria	Mariela Pashalieva; Bulgaria
Rope	Elizabeth Koleva; Bulgaria; Albene Dimitrova; Bulgaria; Alexandra Timochenko; Soviet Union	none awarded	none awarded
Hoop	Elizabeth Koleva; Bulgaria	Natalia Liutova; Soviet Union; Alexandra Timochenko; Soviet Union	none awarded
Ball	Elizabeth Koleva; Bulgaria; Mariela Pashalieva; Bulgaria; Larissa Medvedeva; Soviet Union	none awarded	none awarded
Ribbon	Albene Dimitrova; Bulgaria; Elizabeth Koleva; Bulgaria	Larissa Medvedeva; Soviet Union; Alexandra Timochenko; Soviet Union	none awarded
Groups
All-Around	Bulgaria	Spain; Alejandra Bolaños; Eva Martín; Arancha Marty; Carmen Martínez; Mari Carmen Moreno; Raquel Prat; Nuria Rico; Carmen Sánchez	Poland

== Medal table ==
Rank	Nation	Gold	Silver	Bronze	Total
1	Bulgaria (BUL)	9	1	1	11
2	Soviet Union (URS)	2	4	0	6
3	Spain (ESP)	0	1	0	1
4	Poland (POL)	0	0	1	1
Totals (4 entries)		11	6	2	19
