= 1984 Rhythmic Gymnastics European Championships =

- Location: Vienna, Austria
- Start date: 15 November 1984
- End date: 18 November 1984

The 1984 Rhythmic Gymnastics European Championships was the 4th edition of the Rhythmic Gymnastics European Championships, which took place from 15 November 1984 to 18 November 1984 in Vienna, Austria.

Bulgarian gymnasts dominated the competition, winning a total of eight gold medals across the six events after ties. All the individual medals were won by either Bulgarian or Soviet gymnasts, with ties occurring in all of the individual events. A total of thirteen perfect 10.0 scores were given.

The individual all-around gold medal was won by Anelia Ralenkova from Bulgaria and Galina Beloglazova from the Soviet Union; Beloglazova's score for her last routine, ribbon, was raised from 9.95 to 10.0 by Yuri Titov, the president of the International Gymnastics Federation, after a disagreement among the judges. The altered score tied the two gymnasts. Ralenkova expressed anger about the result, saying that "Rhythmic gymnastics is no longer a competition between athletes, but a competition between judges." After the awards ceremony, both she and Beloglazova reportedly insulted the gymnastics style of each other's country. Diliana Georgieva won the bronze medal.

In the apparatus finals, Ralenkova went on to win three more gold medals in all events but ribbon, where Beloglazova tied for gold with Georgieva.

In the group event, the Bulgarian group won their third European gold medal ahead of the reigning champions, the Soviet group. The Spanish group won the bronze medal by 0.1 points over the West German group.

== Medal winners ==
| Event | Gold | Silver | Bronze |
|---|---|---|---|
Individual
| All-Around | Anelia Ralenkova; Bulgaria; Galina Beloglazova; Soviet Union | none awarded | Diliana Georgieva; Bulgaria |
| Hoop | Anelia Ralenkova; Bulgaria; Lilia Ignatova; Bulgaria | none awarded | Galina Beloglazova; Soviet Union |
| Ball | Anelia Ralenkova; Bulgaria | Lilia Ignatova; Bulgaria; Dalia Kutkaite; Soviet Union; Galina Beloglazova; Soviet Union | none awarded |
| Clubs | Anelia Ralenkova; Bulgaria; Diliana Georgieva; Bulgaria | none awarded | Galina Beloglazova; Soviet Union; Dalia Kutkaite; Soviet Union |
| Ribbon | Diliana Georgieva; Bulgaria; Galina Beloglazova; Soviet Union | none awarded | Anelia Ralenkova; Bulgaria |
Groups
| All-Around | Bulgaria | Soviet Union | Spain; María Fernández Ostolaza; Pilar Domenech; Virginia Manzanera; Eva Obalat; Nancy Usero; Graciela Yanes |

== Medal table ==
| Rank | Nation | Gold | Silver | Bronze | Total |
|---|---|---|---|---|---|
| 1 | Bulgaria (BUL) | 8 | 1 | 2 | 11 |
| 2 | Soviet Union (URS) | 2 | 2 | 3 | 7 |
| 3 | Spain (ESP) | 0 | 0 | 1 | 1 |
| Totals (3 entries) | | 10 | 3 | 6 | 19 |
