= Ana María de Martínez =

Salvadoran artist

Ana María Avilés de Martínez (May 28, 1937 - December 16, 2012) was a Salvadoran artist.

== Artistic periods ==
Her work is often compared to the Dutch Masters of the 17th century. Her mastery of light and the art of chiaroscuro, the technique of contrasting light and shade in order to enhance shape, form, texture, and transparency.

Primitive Period

Martínez began her career in the late 1960s, in what is known in Spanish as her "Epoca Primitiva", which roughly translates to "Primitive Period", which began after she participated in a clay modeling course sponsored by the French embassy in San Salvador (1967-1968). Here, she made casts and polychrome pourings using many techniques including encaustics, which she would later use in paintings, combined with other contemporary techniques and materials. It was during this time that Ana Maria, inspired by Mayan and Colonial art, began the search for a style of her own where she could begin to express her message of "spiritual peace and the joy of living". She focuses on regional landscapes and the traditions of Salvadoran folklore and its and the traditions of Salvadoran folklore and its surroundings - fields of flowers and scenes with great architectonic ideas - all executed with great precision. In this period, which carried on until around 1982, she evolved very quickly, blending colors with the magic of the artist.

The "Romantic Period" (1986-1989), known as the "Epoca Romantica" in Spanish, follows, where Martínez lets go of her casual primitivism and ventures inside the creation of harmonious and sophisticated shapes and forms. Her compositions blend high-reality elements with flowers, fruits, and volcanoes. Her artwork is published to reflect the poetry of Salvadorean poet, Claudia Lars (actual name Carmen Brannon) in Tierra de Infancia.

== Recognition ==
In 1986, by invitation of the government of Italy, Martinez participated in the Festival "Dei Due Mondi" which takes place every year in the city of Spoleto, Italy.

Martinez’s artwork has been displayed in university exhibits including "Exhibition: 'Latin American Modern Masters'" in the University of Pennsylvania. Her artwork has been presented in various exhibitions in America (Latin America, USA, and Canada) and European cities.

Her artwork was made part of the permanent collection of the Nassau County Museum of Art in New York in January 2010. "Teatro de Naranjas (Theater of Oranges) (1991) by Salvadoran Ana Maria de Martinez lives up to its title by presenting the subject matter of still life in a highly theatrical way"

Alongside her artistic career, Martínez has received acknowledgments of her work such as "Distinguished Visitor" by the mayor of Miami, Florida, USA; "Certificate of Appreciation" by the city of Coral Gables, Florida, USA for her participation in the development of art and culture.

- Sale of "Theater of Oranges" at Christie's New York: Thursday, May 19, 1994 [Lot 250] in Latin American Paintings, Drawings, Sculpture and Prints
- Sale of "Mandarines" at Christie's New York: Wednesday, May 17, 1995 [Lot 249] in Important Latin American Paintings, Drawings & Sculpture
- Sale of "Dead Nature with Oranges and Grapes" at Christie's New York: Tuesday, November 21, 1995 [Lot 257] in Important Latin American Paintings, Drawings & Sculpture

Her works reside in museums and collections, such as the Duchess of Alba collection in Spain, the private collection of former US President Ronald Reagan, the permanent collection of contemporary painters of El Salvador in "Museo Marte" (the National Gallery of El Salvador) where she was featured as the "Artist of the Month" in February 2010, the exhibit "Latinas!" in Jan 2010 to Feb 28 2010.

== Death ==
Martínez died on December 16, 2012, at San Salvador, El Salvador.
