= Ivanka Chakarova =

Bulgarian rhythmic gymnastics coach and judge

- Иванка Чакърова
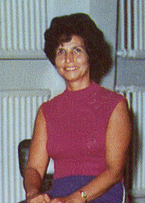
- Born: 15 January 1932; Varna, Bulgaria
- Died: 22 June 2008 (aged 76); Toronto, Canada
- Education: National Sports Academy "Vassil Levski"
- Occupation: Rhythmic Gymnastics' trainer
- Years active: 1960s-2000s
- Successor: Emilia Boneva
- Spouse: Krastio Chakarov
- Children: Daniela Chakarova

Ivanka Chakarova (15 January 1932 - 22 June 2009) was a Bulgarian rhythmic gymnastics coach and judge. She was the first national coach in the history of the Spanish national rhythmic gymnastics team, between 1974 and 1978. She is considered one of the main promoters of Bulgarian and Spanish rhythmic gymnastics.

== Career ==
A student at the National Sports Academy in Sofia (Bulgaria), she was a gymnast during the 1950s and early 1960s. She later coached the Bulgarian national team and was one of the founders of the independent Bulgarian Rhythmic Gymnastics Federation, of whom she was vice president and then president from 1966 to 1973. She is considered a very influential figure in the development of rhythmic gymnastics in Bulgaria, which at that time achieved successes such as the world titles won by María Gigova or the Bulgarian group. Tchakarova was also a member of the Rhythmic Gymnastics Technical Committee of the International Gymnastics Federation from 1966 to 1976 and since 1976, Honorary Member of said body.

Subsequently, the Spanish Gymnastics Federation chose her to be the first national coach of the Spanish national rhythmic gymnastics team. She held that position from 1974 to 1978, and had the help as coaches of Carmen Algora and, at first, also of Teresa de Isla. Initially they trained at the National Sports Delegation, and later they moved to the Moscardó Gymnasium in Madrid. They also held several concentrations before the competitions, such as those they had in Pontevedra, Sofia or Varna.

Among her achievements at that time were the medals of María Jesús Alegre, Begoña Blasco and the Spanish group at the World Championships in Madrid in 1975, and the bronze medal for Susana Mendizábal at the 1978 European Championships, also in Madrid. From 1980 to 1981 she returned to the national team, but this time only as an individual coach alongside María José Rodríguez. One of her trainees, Marta Bobo, went to the 1984 Los Angeles Olympic Games, finishing 9th.

After stopping coaching the Spanish team, she lived in Canada since the mid-80s, where she spent many years as coach of the Kalev Club in Toronto, later owning her own club, called Newvol, in the same city. She subsequently trained in Mexico for a period of time. She died on June 22, 2009, in a Toronto hospital, two days after suffering a heart attack.
