= Eva Obalat =

Spanish rhythmic gymnast

- Full name: Eva Obalat Mangrané
- Born: 5 July 1969 (age 57) Tortosa, Spain

Gymnastics career
- Discipline: Rhythmic gymnastics
- Country represented: Spain (1984-1986)
- Club: Club Escuela de Gimnasia Rítmica de Zaragoza
- Head coach: Emilia Boneva
- Retired: yes
Medal record
Representing Spain
European Championships
Bronze medal – third place	1984 Vienna	Group All-Around
Bronze medal – third place	1986 Florence	Group All-Around

Eva Obalat Mangrané (born 5 July 1969) is retired Spanish rhythmic gymnast and chief executive officer. As a gymnast she's a double European bronze medalist.

== Biography ==
Eva took up gymnastics at the age of 6, later joining the Zaragoza Rhythmic Gymnastics School Club. In 1979 she won a bronze medal in the individual All-Around of the 3rd category in the Spanish Championships in Madrid. In 1982 she was 4th in the All-Around of the 2nd category in Palencia. From 1982 to 1983 her family moved to Venezuela, so she had to give up gymnastics for a year, upon her return in 1983 she rejoined the Zaragoza Rhythmic Gymnastics School Club.

In the spring of 1984 she entered the Spanish rhythmic gymnastics national team, training at the Moscardó Gymnasium in Madrid under the orders of Emilia Boneva and the group coach, Ana Roncero, Georgi Neykov was the team's choreographer and Violeta Portaska was the pianist in charge of providing live music for the routines.

That year Eva along María Fernández Ostolaza, Pilar Domenech, Virginia Manzanera, Nancy Usero and Graciela Yanes, in addition to Rocío Ducay and Ofelia Rodríguez as substitutes, won bronze at the European Championship in Vienna. After this achievement, they were all awarded the Medal of Gymnastic Merit of 1984 from the Royal Spanish Gymnastics Federation that was given to them in 1985 in a ceremony presided over by Alfonso de Borbón y Dampierre, Duke of Cádiz, then president of the COE.

In the World Championships in Valladolid in 1985, along María Fernández, Pilar Domenech, Ofelia Rodríguez, Nancy Usero and Graciela Yanes, with Ester Domínguez, Rocío Ducay, Laura Manzanera and Estela Martín as substitutes, Spain was 7th in the All-Around.

By 1986, with the retirement of María Fernández and several of her teammates, she became the captain of the new group. That she year won another bronze medal, this time at the European Championships in Florence, along Marisa Centeno, Natalia Marín, Estela Martín, Ana Martínez and Elena Velasco. A month later they traveled to Tokyo to compete in the World Cup Final, where they achieved 4th place.

After her retirement she lived in Dublin for 18 years. In June 1990 she became executive director of Aupair Study Centre, an Irish company dedicated to hosting au pairs, where she remained until August 2006. After her return to Spain, in August 2006 she began working as executive director at Catalan Ways, a company specialized in tourist accommodation in L' Ampolla and of which she is also the owner.

After Emilia Boneva's death on 20 September 2019, Eva and other former national gymnasts gathered to pay tribute to her during the Euskalgym held on 16 November 2019, the event took place before 8,500 attendees at the Bilbao Exhibition Center de Baracaldo and was followed by a dinner in her honor.
