= María Fernández Ostolaza =

Spanish rhythmic gymnast

María Fernández
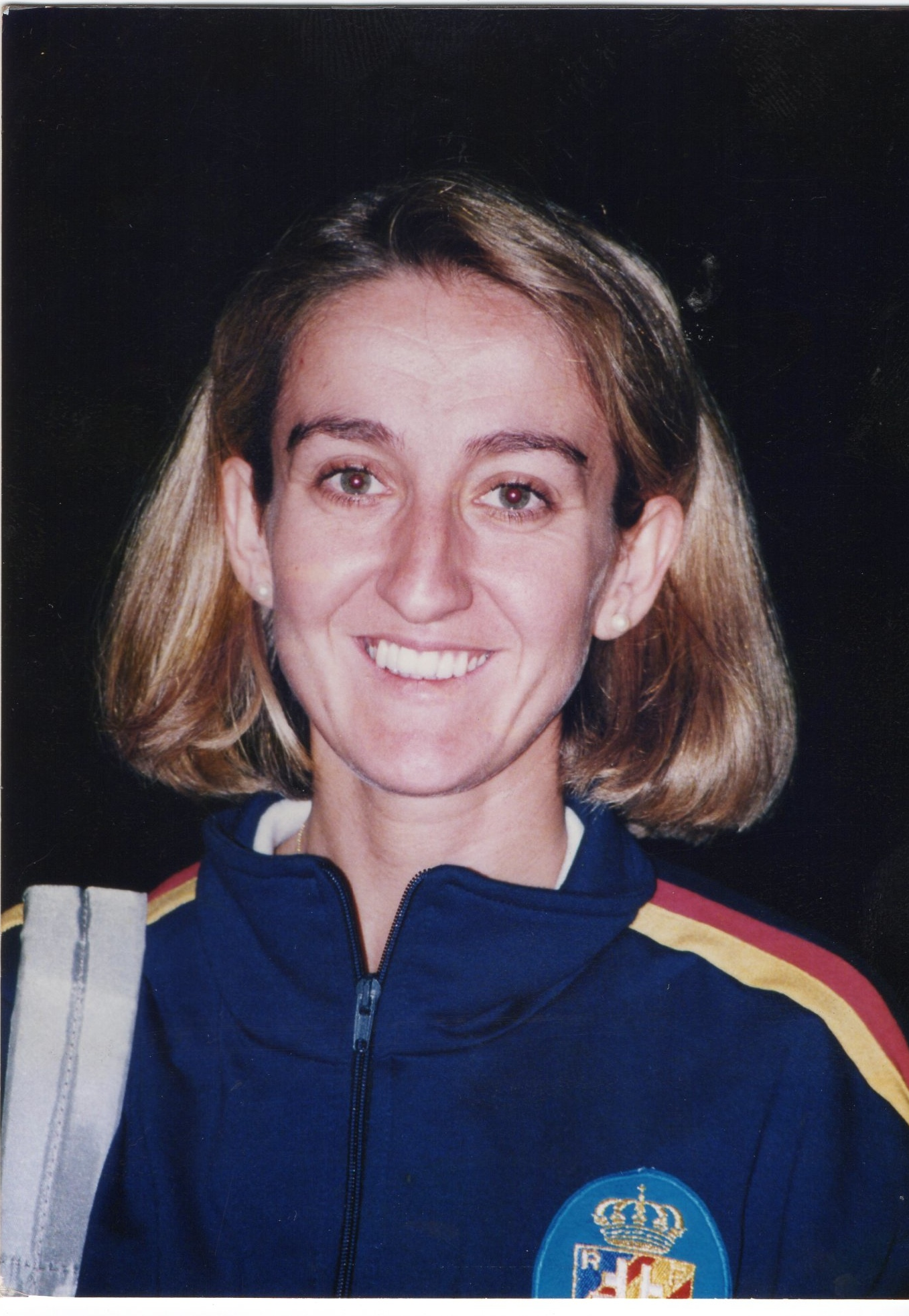

Personal information
- Full name: María Fernández Ostolaza
- Born: 14 July 1967 (age 59) Madrid, Spain

Gymnastics career
- Discipline: Rhythmic gymnastics
- Country represented: Spain (1981-1986)
- Club: Club Deportivo Colegio El Molino / Club Moscardó
- Head coach: Emilia Boneva
- Retired: yes
Medal record
Representing Spain
European Championships
Bronze medal – third place	1984 Vienna	Group All-Around

María Fernández Ostolaza (born 14 July 1967) is retired Spanish rhythmic gymnast and coach. As a gymnast she's a European bronze medalist, as a trainer she led the group to international success.

== Biography ==
Her first club was the Club Deportivo Colegio El Molino from 1976 to 1984. From 1985 to 1986, she trained at Club Moscardó. Her main coach was Aurora Fernández del Valle.

In 1979 she was 8th overall in the 2nd category in the Spanish Individual Championship held in Madrid. In 1981 she took 6th in the individual All-Around of the 2nd category at nationals in Pamplona. That same year she joined the national rhythmic gymnastics team, becoming its captain from 1984 until her retirement. There she trained at the Moscardó Gymnasium in Madrid under the orders of Emilia Boneva and the group coach, Ana Roncero. Georgi Neykov was the team's choreographer and Violeta Portaska was the pianist in charge of providing live music for the routines.

In 1983, Fernández participated as a substitute gymnast in the World Cup Final in Belgrade, where Spain placed 4th. That same year she became a part of the main quintet after Elena García and Victoria García retired, competing at the World Championships in Strasbourg along Pino Díaz, Pilar Domenech, Isabel García, Virginia Manzanera and Sonia Somoza with Dolores Tamariz as the alternate, finishing 5th in the All-Around.

In 1984 María was part of the Spanish group that won bronze at the European Championship in Vienna. The members of the group were María, Pilar Domenech, Virginia Manzanera, Eva Obalat, Nancy Usero and Graciela Yanes, in addition to Rocío Ducay and Ofelia Rodríguez as substitutes. After this achievement, they were all awarded the Medal of Gymnastic Merit of 1984 from the Royal Spanish Gymnastics Federation that was given to them in 1985 in a ceremony presided over by Alfonso de Borbón y Dampierre, Duke of Cádiz, then president of the COE.

At the 1985 World Championships in Valladolid the group was 7th in the All-Around along Pilar Domenech, Eva Obalat, Ofelia Rodríguez, Nancy Usero and Graciela Yanes, in addition to Ester Domínguez, Rocío Ducay, Laura Manzanera and Estela Martín as substitutes.

In January 1993, during Ana Roncero's period as national head coach, Fernández became coach of the group, a position she kept throughout Emilia Boneva's last stage as head coach. In December 1996 she was also named national head coach, replacing Boneva herself, who had undergone heart surgery in November. In May 1998, after the World Championship held in Seville, she resigned as head coach and coach. She returned in July of the same year and later, in September, she passed the title of head coach to Nancy Usero. As a trainer her most notable success was the gold medal won at the Atlanta Olympic Games in 1996 by Marta Baldó, Nuria Cabanillas, Estela Giménez, Lorena Guréndez, Tania Lamarca and Estíbaliz Martínez, who would become known since then as the Niñas de Oro. She also led the group to win several medals at the World Championships in 1994, 1995, 1996 and 1998, or the European Championships in 1993, 1995 and 1997.

She graduated in Contemporary History from the Complutense University of Madrid and in Psychology from the National University of Distance Education. She currently works in Madrid as a psychotherapist, combining this work with external consulting functions for different organizations. Her theoretical framework is psychoanalysis, from where she investigates topics related to the area of sports psychology and business psychology. She directs the psychology area of the High Level Athlete Care Program (PROAD), of the Higher Sports Council, coordinating the Sports Retirement Program and the Prevention Program for High Performance Underage Athletes.

After Emilia Boneva's death on 20 September 2019, María and other former national gymnasts gathered to pay tribute to her during the Euskalgym held on 16 November 2019, the event took place before 8,500 attendees at the Bilbao Exhibition Center de Baracaldo and was followed by a dinner in her honor.

== Legacy and influence ==
The bronze medal at the European Championships in Vienna in 1984 was the first for the Spanish group since 1975, and then began a long period of winning international medals. In an interview in 2016, María highlighted the importance of that medal for Spanish rhythmic gymnastics:

At that time, what we wanted was to overthrow the Eastern countries [...] As the medals were always Russia, Bulgaria and Czechoslovakia, ours was a great milestone and the bronze in the European Championship was indeed a feat for the team . It was the start of something.

The former captain of the Spanish team Ana María Pelaz declared in an interview in 2009 after her retirement that "when I saw the group in Atlanta '96 I said to myself: I want to be like them.". The gymnast Carolina Rodríguez, once asked about the origins of her passion for rhythmic, stated that "in 1996, after seeing Spain win gold in Atlanta, when I was 10 years old, I knew that one day I would want to be there, that I wanted to be at the Olympics." Alejandra Quereda, captain of the Spanish team known as Equipaso and current head coach of the national team, asked in 2014 what for her had been the most incredible thing that has happened in gymnastics, answered that "Spain's gold in Atlanta. It marked the history of our gymnastics. From there everything changed."

The 1996 5 hoops' routine has been honored by other gymnasts, such as in the exhibition exercise of the Spanish junior group at Euskalgym 2012 (made up of Paula Gómez, Sara González, Miriam Guerra, Claudia Heredia, Carmen Martínez, Victoria Plaza and Pilar Villanueva), where, as in the 1996 exercise, "America" by Leonard Bernstein was used, in addition to two other songs from the West Side Story soundtrack: "Dance at the Gym" and "Overture".The 2016 Spanish junior group, Mónica Alonso, Victoria Cuadrillero, Clara Esquerdo, Ana Gayán, Alba Polo, Lía Rovira and Sara Salarrullana also honored this exercise at the 20th Anniversary Gold Medal Gala in Atlanta '96, using the same music and emulating some movements from the original routine. At the Euskalgym 2018, the gymnasts Saioa Agirre, Teresa Gorospe, Izaro Martín and Salma Solaun also performed part of the exercise during the tribute to the Basque Olympic rhythmic gymnasts.

=== In popular culture ===
Among other appearances, Fernández Ostolaza has served as the basis for the eponymous character of María, who appears in the series of children's stories Olympia (2014), written by Almudena Cid and illustrated by Montse Martín. The story of the 1996 Olympic medal milestone appears in books such as Españoles de oro (1999) by Fernando Olmeda and Juan Manuel Gozalo, Enredando en la memoria (2015) by Paloma del Río, or Pinceladas de rítmica (2017) by Montse and Manel Martin.
