= Ana Martínez Collado =

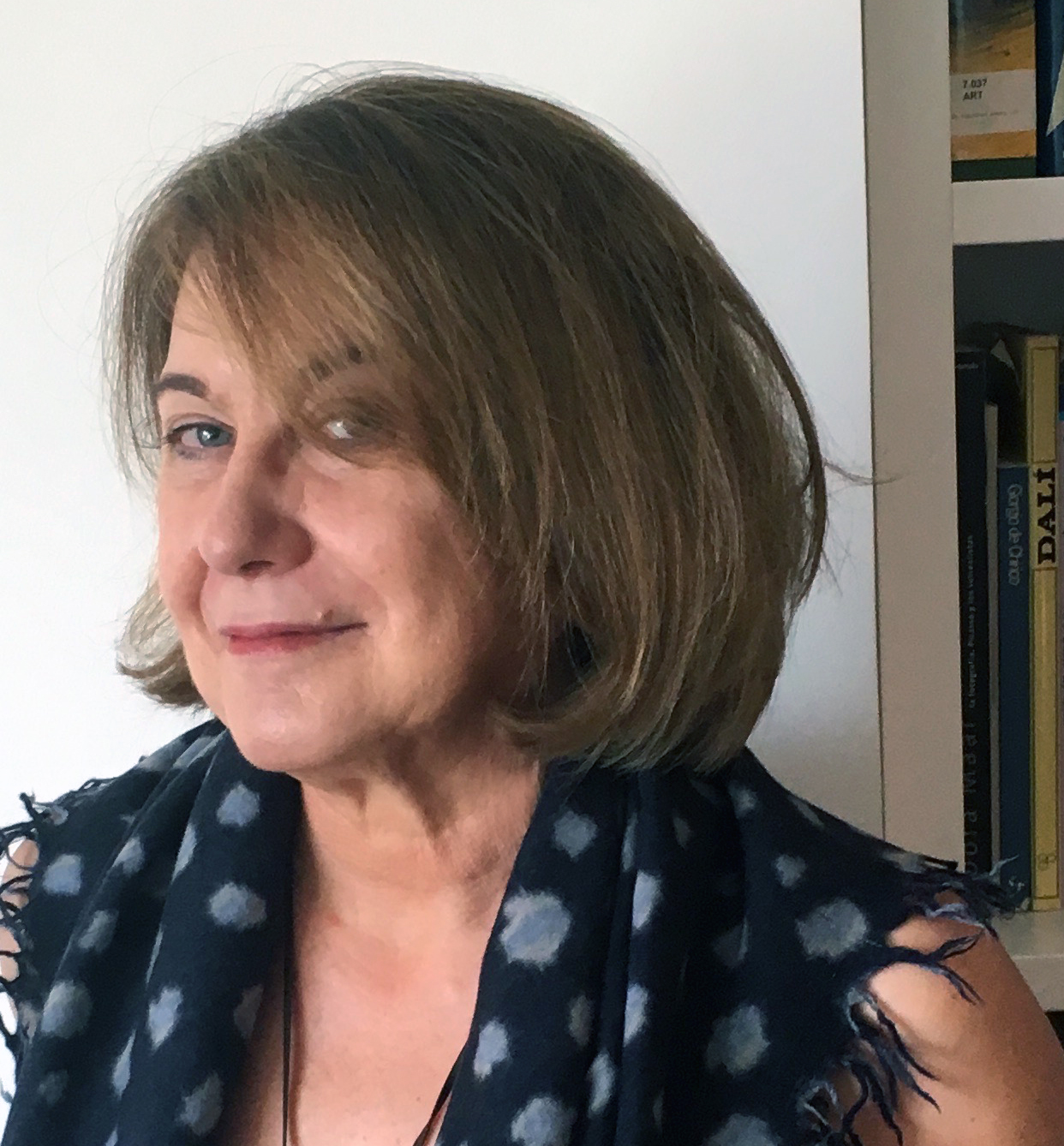
Ana Martínez Collado

Ana Martínez Collado (born 1950) is a Spanish art theorist, feminist and writer on aesthetics.

Martínez Collado has edited Ramón Gómez de la Serna’s writings on aesthetics and written about his reaction to modern art. In 2006 she curated an exhibition on cyberfeminism at the Museum for Modern Art in Castellón de la Plana.

== Works ==
- (ed.) Una teoría personal del arte: antología de textos de estética y teoría del arte by Ramón Gómez de la Serna, 1988
- La complejidad de lo moderno: Ramón y el arte nuevo, 1996
- Tendenci@s: perspectivas feministas en el arte actual, 2005
