= 1983 FIG Rhythmic Gymnastics World Cup =

International rhythmic gymnastics competition

The 1983 FIG Rhythmic Gymnastics World Cup was the first edition of the Rhythmic Gymnastics World Cup, held from April 15 to April 17 in Belgrade, Yugoslavia. The competition was officially organized by the International Gymnastics Federation and followed the steps of the Artistic Gymnastics World Cup, first held in 1975.

== Medalists ==
| Event | Gold | Silver | Bronze | Ref. |
| Individual all-around | (Bulgaria) Lilia Ignatova | (Soviet Union) Dalia Kutkaitė | (Bulgaria) Anelia Ralenkova | |
| Ball | (Bulgaria) Anelia Ralenkova | (Bulgaria) Lilia Ignatova | (Bulgaria) Iliana Raeva | |
| Hoop | (Bulgaria) Lilia Ignatova | (Bulgaria) Iliana Raeva | (Soviet Union) Irina Devina | |
| Clubs | (Bulgaria) Anelia Ralenkova | (Bulgaria) Lilia Ignatova (Bulgaria) Iliana Raeva | —N/a | |
| Ribbon | (Soviet Union) Dalia Kutkaitė | (Bulgaria) Lilia Ignatova | (Soviet Union) Irina Devina | |
| Group all-around | Soviet Union; Elena Bukreeva | Bulgaria | Japan | |

== Medal table ==
| Rank | Nation | Gold | Silver | Bronze | Total |
|---|---|---|---|---|---|
| 1 | Bulgaria (BUL) | 4 | 6 | 2 | 12 |
| 2 | Soviet Union (URS) | 2 | 1 | 2 | 5 |
| 3 | Japan (JPN) | 0 | 0 | 1 | 1 |
| Totals (3 entries) | | 6 | 7 | 5 | 18 |

== See also ==
- World Rhythmic Gymnastics Championships
- FIG World Cup
- List of medalists at the FIG World Cup Final
