= 1978 Rhythmic Gymnastics European Championships =

- Location: Madrid, Spain
- Start date: 10 October 1978
- End date: 12 October 1978

The 1978 Rhythmic Gymnastics European Championships is the 1st edition of the Rhythmic Gymnastics European Championships, which took place from 10 to 12 October 1978 in Madrid, Spain.

== Medal winners ==
Event	Gold	Silver	Bronze
Individual
All-Around	Galina Shugurova; Soviet Union	Irina Deriugina; Soviet Union	Susana Mendizábal; Spain
Rope	Galina Shugurova; Soviet Union	Irina Deriugina; Soviet Union	Kristina Guiourova; Bulgaria
Ball	Irina Deriugina; Soviet Union	Galina Shugurova; Soviet Union	Kristina Guiourova; Bulgaria
Ribbon	Galina Shugurova; Soviet Union	Irina Deriugina; Soviet Union; Daniela Bošanská; Czechoslovakia	none awarded
Groups
All-Around	Bulgaria; Krasimira Vasileva; Maya Georgieva	Soviet Union; Olga Rabinovich	Czechoslovakia

== Medal table ==
Rank	Nation	Gold	Silver	Bronze	Total
1	Soviet Union (URS)	4	5	0	9
2	Bulgaria (BUL)	1	0	2	3
3	Czechoslovakia (TCH)	0	1	1	2
4	Spain (ESP)	0	0	1	1
Totals (4 entries)		5	6	4	15
