= Iliana Raeva =

Bulgarian rhythmic gymnast

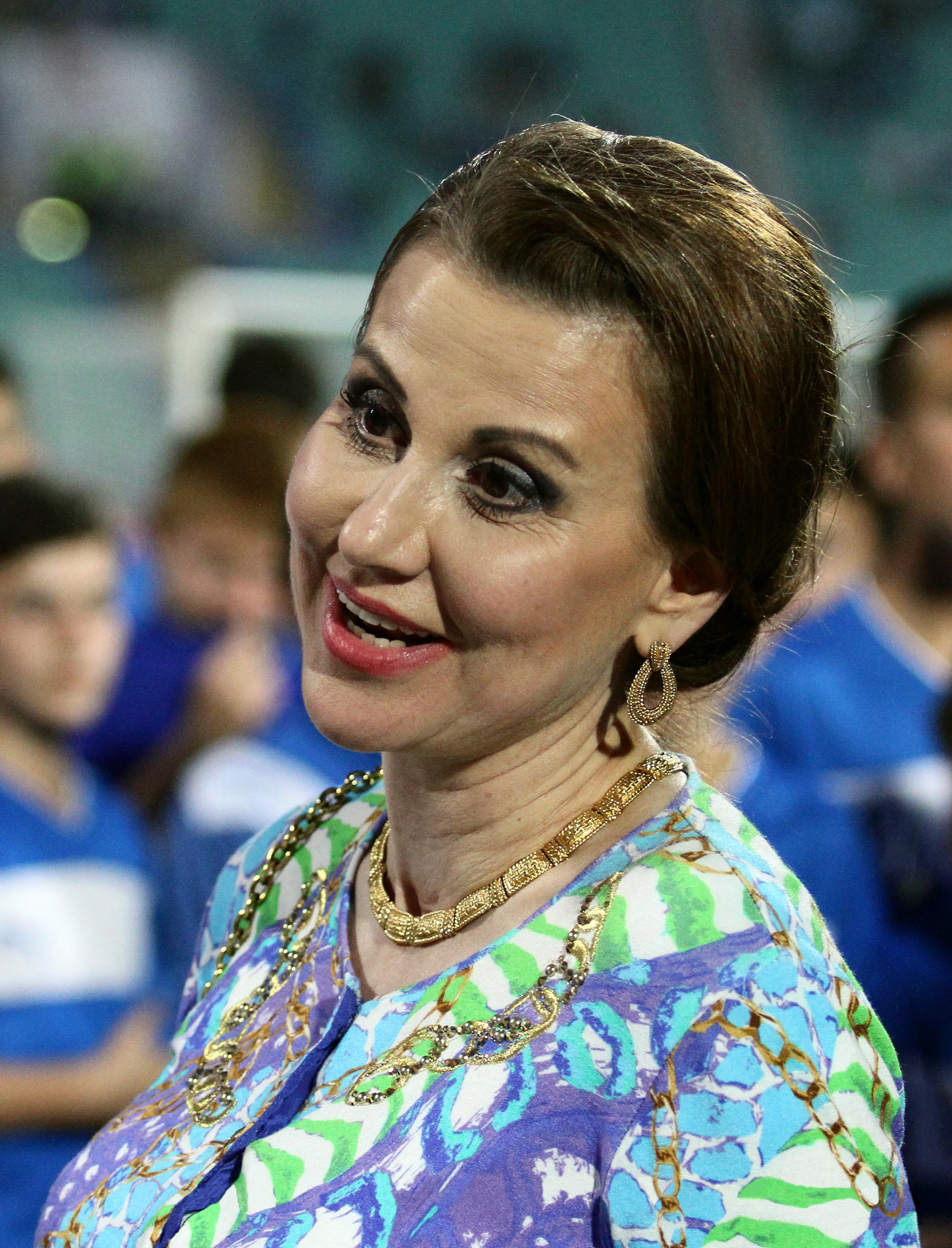
- Raeva in 2014

Personal information
- Full name: Iliana Raycheva Raeva-Sirakova
- Alternative name: Iliana Raycheva Raeva
- Born: 15 March 1963 (age 63) Sofia, Bulgaria

Gymnastics career
- Discipline: Rhythmic gymnastics
- Country represented: Bulgaria (1978–1983)
- Club: Levski-Spartak
- Head coach: Neshka Robeva
- Assistant coach: Zlatka Bontcheva
Medal record
Representing Bulgaria
World Championships
Gold medal – first place	1979 London	Clubs
Silver medal – second place	1979 London	Ball
Silver medal – second place	1981 Munich	All-around
Silver medal – second place	1981 Munich	Hoop
Silver medal – second place	1981 Munich	Ribbon
Bronze medal – third place	1981 Munich	Rope
European Championships
Gold medal – first place	1980 Amsterdam	All-around
Gold medal – first place	1980 Amsterdam	Rope
Gold medal – first place	1980 Amsterdam	Hoop
Gold medal – first place	1980 Amsterdam	Clubs
Silver medal – second place	1980 Amsterdam	Ribbon
Silver medal – second place	1982 Stavanger	Rope
Bronze medal – third place	1982 Stavanger	All-around
Bronze medal – third place	1982 Stavanger	Hoop
Bronze medal – third place	1982 Stavanger	Clubs
Bronze medal – third place	1982 Stavanger	Ribbon
World Cup Final
Silver medal – second place	1983 Belgrade	Clubs
Silver medal – second place	1983 Belgrade	Hoop
Bronze medal – third place	1983 Belgrade	Ball

Iliana Raycheva Raeva-Sirakova (née Raeva; Bulgarian: Илиана Райчева Раева-Сиракова; born 15 March 1963) is a Bulgarian gymnast who competed in modern rhythmic gymnastics for her country from 1978 to 1983 . She was one of the Golden Girls of Bulgaria that dominated Rhythmic Gymnastics in 1980s.

== Biography ==
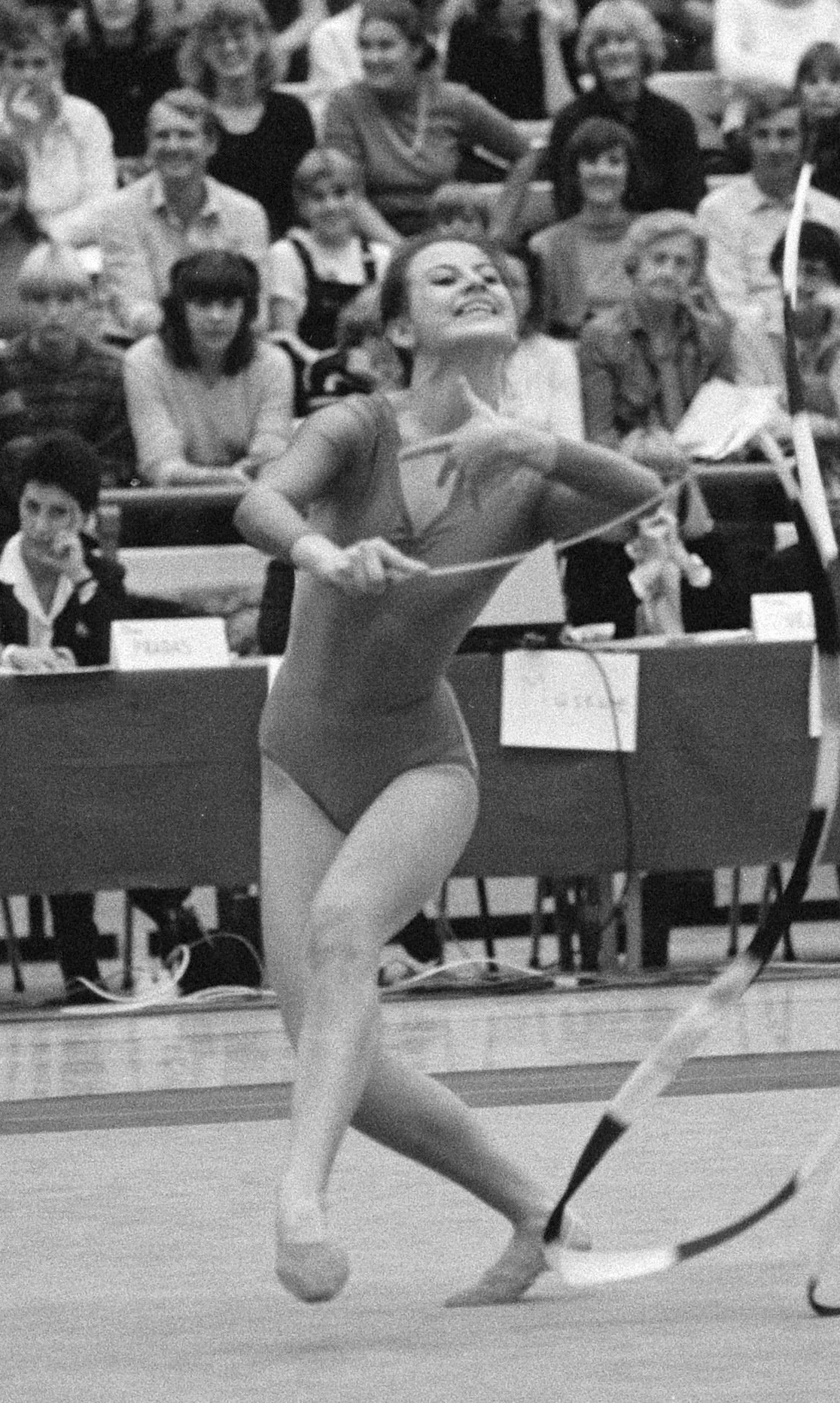

She was born on 15 March 1963 in Sofia, Bulgaria. She was raised in Sofia, on the same street as fellow gymnasts Lilia Ignatova and Anelia Ralenkova, who also competed for the same Levski gymnastics club. Iliana was the recognized leader, both in their street games and in the team, who started learning gymnastics ABC under the clever and experienced eyes of the coach Zlatka Bontcheva in "Levski-Spartak " club, Sofia. At 15 Iliana went on to train under Neshka Robeva who had joined the club shortly before.

In March 1978 she was supposed to fly to Poland for a tournament, but missed a flight due to falling ill the day before. The plane crashed in undisclosed circumstances and to this day remains the deadliest plane crash in Bulgaria.

She placed sixth at her first European Championships in 1978 at the age of 16, and was 4th in the all round competition at the World Rhythmic Gymnastics Championships where she won the gold medal for clubs, and the silver for ball. Raeva won her first all around gold at the 1980 Julieta Shishmanova Cup, and went on to dominate the European Championships in Amsterdam, winning the all around gold medal, gold for rope, hoop and clubs, and placing silver with the ribbon.

Iliana's first "great day" was in London, at the 1979 World Championships, when she shared the gold for the clubs routine together with the AA champion Irina Deriugina of (USSR) and Daniella Boshanska (CZE). One year later, at the 1980 European Championships in Amsterdam, Raeva swept the gold in the all around, rope, hoop and clubs.

She claimed all around silver at the 1981 World Championships, and tied with teammate Ignatova for the silver, one tenth of a point behind the winner Ralenkova. She won silver for hoop and ribbon, and bronze for the rope. She was third at the 1982 European Championships, picking up bronze in each apparatus final.

She relied on style and artistry, rather than excessively complex moves, with her 1980 ribbon routine to Zorba the Greek and clubs routine to Tchaikovsky's Swan Lake, which remain outstanding examples of the sport.

After retiring from active competition she married Bulgarian World Cup footballer Nasko Sirakov, and now runs her own gymnastics club "Iliana" in Bulgaria. In 1999, she became the Head of the Council of Coaches in the Bulgarian Rhythmic Gymnastics Federation. She led the Bulgarian team in the 2000 Olympic Games in Sydney. She was the coach of the Bulgarian Group, which won the bronze medal in the 2004 Summer Olympics in Athens.

In 2012, she took over the management of the Bulgarian Rhythmic Gymnastics Federation. With Raeva at the helm, the Bulgarian team won a bronze medal for the second time and its first absolute Olympic title in the ensembles, as well as a vice-Olympic title in the individual competition for the second time in history. In October 2024, she was re-elected for a fourth consecutive term as president of the federation.
