= 1980 Rhythmic Gymnastics European Championships =

- Location: Amsterdam, the Netherlands
- Start date: 24 October 1980
- End date: 26 October 1980

The 1980 Rhythmic Gymnastics European Championships is the 2nd edition of the Rhythmic Gymnastics European Championships, which took place from 24 October 1980 to 26 October 1980 in Amsterdam, the Netherlands.

== Medal winners ==
Event	Gold	Silver	Bronze
Individual
All-Around	Iliana Raeva; Bulgaria	Lilia Ignatova; Bulgaria	Inessa Lisovskaya; Soviet Union
Rope	Iliana Raeva; Bulgaria	Elena Tomas; Soviet Union	Daniela Bošanská; Czechoslovakia
Hoop	Iliana Raeva; Bulgaria	Lilia Ignatova; Bulgaria	Carmen Rischer; West Germany
Clubs	Iliana Raeva; Bulgaria; Lilia Ignatova; Bulgaria	none awarded	Inessa Lisovskaya; Soviet Union
Ribbon	Iliana Raeva; Bulgaria	Lilia Ignatova; Bulgaria	Inessa Lisovskaya; Soviet Union
Groups
All-Around	Bulgaria	Soviet Union	Czechoslovakia

== Medal table ==
Rank	Nation	Gold	Silver	Bronze	Total
1	Bulgaria (BUL)	7	3	0	10
2	Soviet Union (URS)	0	2	3	5
3	Czechoslovakia (TCH)	0	0	2	2
4	West Germany (FRG)	0	0	1	1
Totals (4 entries)		7	5	6	18
