= 1981 World Rhythmic Gymnastics Championships =

- Location: Munich, West Germany
- Start date: 17 October 1981
- End date: 20 October 1981

1981 World Rhythmic Gymnastics Championships were held in Munich, West Germany on October 17 to 20, 1981.

Bulgarian gymnasts won eleven of the sixteen available medals, including all three individual all-around medals. This was the first World Championships where scores were "open", i.e. judges could see the scores given by other judges. Norma Zabka, a judge from the United States, noted that this reduced the influence of the superior judge when attempting to get judges to change their scores.

== Participants ==
The following countries sent competitors: Australia, Austria, Belgium, Brazil, Bulgaria, Canada, China, Cuba, Czechoslovakia, Denmark, East Germany, France, Great Britain, Hungary, Israel, Italy, Japan, Mexico, Netherlands, New Zealand, Norway, Poland, Portugal, Romania, Spain, Sweden, Switzerland, USA, USSR, West Germany and Yugoslavia.

=== Individual ===
Nation	Name	Nation	Name	Nation	Name	Nation	Name
Australia	Robyne Levit	Czechoslovakia	Daniela Bošanská	Japan	Hiroko Yamasaki	Spain	Susana Guillen
Australia	Fiona Wallace	Czechoslovakia	Iveta Havlíčková	Mexico	Martha Gonzales	Sweden	Eva Bergstroem
Austria	Gertrude Ramsauer	Denmark	Liselotte Korsgaard	Netherlands	Angelique de Bruijn	Sweden	Gunloeg Bergvall
Austria	Ulrike Weiss	Denmark	Mette Lyngholm	Netherlands	Sonja Grünewald	Sweden	Anna Janson
Austria	Ursula Wicklicki	East Germany	Bianca Dittrich	Netherlands	Susanne Knip	Switzerland	Suzanne Müller
Belgium	Sarina Roberti	East Germany	Katrin Huschke	New Zealand	Kerry Dougherty	Switzerland	Somea Paolucci
Brazil	Laura Monteiro	East Germany	Petra Loucky	New Zealand	Suzanne Ludlow	Switzerland	Grazia Verzasconi
Brazil	Maria Campos dos Santos	France	Christel Roger	New Zealand	Tania Moss	United States	Lydia Bree Crabtree
Brazil	Laura Seixas	France	Martine Vital	Norway	Marianne Reme	United States	Sue Soffe
Bulgaria	Lilia Ignatova	United Kingdom	Lynette Gordon	Norway	Hilde Soerhaug	United States	Valerie Zimring
Bulgaria	Iliana Raeva	United Kingdom	Jacqueline Leavy	Norway	Shirin Zorriassateiny	Soviet Union	Irina Derjugina
Bulgaria	Anelia Ralenkova	Hungary	Timea Englender	Poland	Teresa Folga	Soviet Union	Irina Devina
Canada	Debbie Bryant	Hungary	Gyorgyi Kovacs	Poland	Ewa Figeland-Kowalak	Soviet Union	Dalia Kutkaitė
Canada	Lori Fung	Hungary	Brigitta Sziraczky	Poland	Anna Klos-Sulima	Germany	Anke Abraham
Canada	Jane Lazor	Israel	Iris Barak	Portugal	Maria Joao Falcao	Germany	Carmen Rischer
People's Republic of China	Jia Shao	Israel	Dafna Gerson	Portugal	Christina Lebre	Germany	Regina Weber
People's Republic of China	Xin Li	Israel	Liath Haninovlitz	Portugal	Elsa Lebre	SFR Yugoslavia	Milena Reljin
People's Republic of China	Xiurong Wang	Italy	Manuela Agnolucci	Romania	Dorina Cordos	SFR Yugoslavia	Silvana Sokolov
Cuba	Aida Hernandez-Barrientos	Italy	Claudia Peccianti	Romania	Rozica Popescu	SFR Yugoslavia	Ljiljana Vugic
Cuba	Roxana Merino-Martinez	Italy	Giulia Staccioli	Romania	Mihaela Tenasa		
Cuba	Cecilia Juara-Rosell	Japan	Kimie Kimura	Spain	Eva Alcaraz		
Czechoslovakia	Šárka Baťková	Japan	Michiyo Ota	Spain	Marta Bobo		

=== Groups ===
Countries who participated in the group competition are as follows.

Flag	Nation	Flag	Nation	Flag	Nation	Flag	Nation
	Austria		Czechoslovakia		New Zealand		United States
	Australia	United Kingdom	Great Britain		Norway	Soviet Union	USSR
	Brazil		Hungary		Poland		West Germany
	Bulgaria		Italy		Spain		
	Canada		Japan		Sweden		
People's Republic of China	China		The Netherlands		Switzerland		

== Medal table ==
Place	Country	Gold	Silver	Bronze	Total
1	Bulgaria	5	7	2	14
2	USSR	1	1	1	3
3	Czechoslovakia	0	0	1	1

== Individual Final ==
=== Individual All-Around ===
Place	Nation	Name	Rope	Hoop	Clubs	Ribbon	Total
1	Bulgaria	Anelia Ralenkova	9.850	9.750	9.800	9.750	39.150
2	Bulgaria	Lilia Ignatova	9.850	9.750	9.750	9.700	39.050
2	Bulgaria	Iliana Raeva	9.800	9.750	9.700	9.800	39.050
4	Soviet Union	Irina Devina	9.650	9.550	9.750	9.800	38.750
5	Soviet Union	Dalia Kutkaitė	9.600	9.700	9.600	9.500	38.400
6	Germany	Carmen Rischer	9.500	9.600	9.500	9.600	38.200
7	Czechoslovakia	Daniela Bošanská	9.600	9.650	9.600	9.250	38.100
8	Czechoslovakia	Iveta Havlíčková	9.450	9.400	9.500	9.500	37.850
9	Soviet Union	Irina Derjugina	9.550	9.750	9.250	9.250	37.800
10	Germany	Regina Weber	9.500	9.450	9.350	9.400	37.700
11	Japan	Kimie Kimura	9.450	9.500	9.350	9.250	37.550
12	Spain	Marta Bobo	9.250	9.400	9.600	9.200	37.450
12	Japan	Hiroko Yamasaki	9.400	9.400	9.250	9.400	37.450
14	Poland	Anna Klos-Sulima	9.300	9.550	9.500	9.050	37.400
15	Hungary	Gyorgyi Kovacs	9.400	9.200	9.300	9.350	37.250
16	Czechoslovakia	Šárka Baťková	9.350	9.450	9.400	9.000	37.200
17	Poland	Ewa Figeland-Kowalak	9.300	9.400	9.300	9.150	37.150
17	SFR Yugoslavia	Milena Reljin	9.400	9.300	9.300	9.150	37.150
19	East Germany	Bianca Dittrich	9.200	9.250	9.400	9.050	36.900
20	Spain	Susana Guillen	9.150	9.300	9.250	8.950	36.650
21	Spain	Eva Alcaraz	9.250	9.200	9.250	8.900	36.600
22	Japan	Michiyo Ota	9.200	9.050	9.300	8.950	36.500
23	Poland	Teresa Folga	9.350	9.200	8.900	8.900	36.350
24	Hungary	Timea Englender	9.250	9.250	8.950	8.850	36.300
24	Sweden	Anna Janson	9.200	8.950	9.250	8.900	36.300
24	People's Republic of China	Jia Shao	9.100	9.150	8.950	9.100	36.300
27	Germany	Anke Abraham	9.150	9.500	8.450	9.100	36.200
27	Italy	Claudia Peccianti	9.000	9.200	9.150	8.850	36.200
29	East Germany	Petra Loucky	9.500	9.200	9.150	8.300	36.150
30	Canada	Lori Fung	9.350	9.200	9.250	8.300	36.100
31	People's Republic of China	Xiurong Wang	9.150	9.000	9.000	8.900	36.050
32	East Germany	Katrin Huschke	9.350	9.100	8.300	9.150	35.900
32	Romania	Rozica Popescu	9.250	9.250	8.450	8.950	35.900
34	United States	Lydia Bree Crabtree	8.900	9.150	8.900	8.900	35.850
35	Sweden	Gunloeg Bergvall	9.150	9.000	8.850	8.800	35.800
35	Italy	Giulia Staccioli	9.100	9.300	8.850	8.550	35.800
37	Canada	Debbie Bryant	9.300	9.050	8.850	8.550	35.750
37	Canada	Jane Lazor	9.100	9.150	8.850	8.650	35.750
37	Switzerland	Grazia Verzasconi	8.850	9.050	9.250	8.600	35.750
40	Romania	Dorina Cordos	9.350	8.600	8.800	8.950	35.700
40	Netherlands	Angelique de Bruijn	9.050	9.200	8.600	8.850	35.700
42	United States	Sue Soffe	9.150	8.700	8.750	9.050	35.650
42	Romania	Mihaela Tenasa	9.300	8.250	8.950	9.150	35.650
44	Cuba	Aida Hernandez-Barrientos	9.000	8.850	9.000	8.750	35.600
44	Netherlands	Susanne Knip	8.900	9.000	8.950	8.750	35.600
44	United States	Valerie Zimring	9.000	9.300	8.700	8.600	35.600
47	People's Republic of China	Xin Li	8.800	8.800	8.850	8.950	35.400
48	Cuba	Roxana Merino-Martinez	8.950	8.900	8.850	8.650	35.350
49	Israel	Dafna Gerson	8.750	9.000	8.650	8.900	35.300
49	United Kingdom	Jacqueline Leavy	8.900	8.900	8.650	8.850	35.300
49	Norway	Marianne Reme	8.800	9.000	9.000	8.500	35.300
52	United Kingdom	Lynette Gordon	8.700	8.800	8.950	8.750	35.200
52	Netherlands	Sonja Grünewald	8.800	8.800	9.050	8.550	35.200
52	SFR Yugoslavia	Silvana Sokolov	9.150	8.600	8.700	8.750	35.200
52	SFR Yugoslavia	Ljiljana Vugic	8.850	9.100	8.550	8.700	35.200
56	Denmark	Mette Lyngholm	8.750	8.900	8.900	8.600	35.150
56	Switzerland	Suzanne Müller	8.850	8.900	8.850	8.550	35.150
58	Norway	Shirin Zorriassareiny	9.050	8.600	8.850	8.550	35.050
59	France	Martina Vital	8.850	9.100	8.500	8.500	34.950
60	Israel	Liath Haninovlitz	9.000	8.900	8.600	8.400	34.900
60	Denmark	Liselotte Korsgaard	8.850	8.750	8.850	8.450	34.900
60	New Zealand	Tania Moss	8.900	8.850	8.550	8.600	34.900
60	France	Christel Roger	8.850	8.900	8.750	8.400	34.900
64	Austria	Gertrude Ramsauer	8.850	8.950	8.650	8.500	34.750
65	New Zealand	Kerry Dougherty	8.850	8.600	8.950	8.300	34.700
66	Austria	Ulrike Weiss	9.000	89.050	8.300	8.250	34.600
67	Sweden	Eva Bergstroem	9.000	8.200	8.650	8.650	34.500
68	Norway	Hilde Soerhaug	8.800	8.850	8.500	8.200	34.350
69	Israel	Iris Barak	8.650	8.550	8.550	8.500	34.250
69	Austria	Ursula Wicklicki	8.850	8.850	8.400	8.150	34.250
71	Australia	Robyne Levit	8.750	8.750	8.300	8.400	34.200
71	Brazil	Laura Monteiro	8.600	8.650	8.550	8.400	34.200
73	Brazil	Laura Seixas	8.750	8.650	8.850	7.900	34.150
74	Cuba	Cecilia Juara-Rosell	8.900	8.950	8.500	7.700	34.050
75	Portugal	Elsa Lebre	8.600	8.750	8.450	8.150	33.950
76	Italy	Manuela Agnolucci	9.050	7.700	8.500	8.650	33.900
77	Portugal	Christina Lebre	8.550	8.700	8.500	8.100	33.850
78	Portugal	Maria Joao Falcao	8.600	8.350	8.450	8.350	33.750
79	Belgium	Sarina Roberti	8.550	8.500	8.500	8.100	33.650
80	Australia	Fiona Wallace	8.550	8.450	8.200	8.200	33.400
81	Switzerland	Somea Paolucci	8.800	7.900	8.500	8.000	33.200
82	New Zealand	Suzanne Ludlow	8.750	8.250	8.450	7.650	33.100
83	Mexico	Martha Gonzales	8.400	8.300	7.950	7.550	32.200
84	Brazil	Maria Campos dos Santos	8.700	8.750	8.650	2.500	28.600
85	Hungary	Brigitta Sziraczky	-	8.650	9.050	7.900	25.600

=== Individual Rope ===
Place	Nation	Name	All Around	Rope	Total
1	Bulgaria	Lilia Ignatova	9.850	9.850	19.700
2	Bulgaria	Anelia Ralenkova	9.850	9.750	19.600
3	Bulgaria	Iliana Raeva	9.800	9.750	19.550
4	Soviet Union	Irina Devina	9.650	9.800	19.450
5	Soviet Union	Dalia Kutkaitė	9.600	9.750	19.350
6	Soviet Union	Irina Derjugina	9.550	9.700	19.250
7	Czechoslovakia	Daniela Bošanská	9.600	9.750	19.350
8	Germany	Carmen Rischer	9.500	9.600	19.100

=== Individual Hoop ===
Place	Nation	Name	All Around	Hoop	Total
1	Bulgaria	Lilia Ignatova	9.750	9.850	19.600
2	Bulgaria	Iliana Raeva	9.750	9.800	19.550
2	Bulgaria	Anelia Ralenkova	9.750	9.800	19.550
4	Soviet Union	Irina Derjugina	9.750	9.750	19.500
5	Soviet Union	Dalia Kutkaitė	9.700	9.650	19.350
6	Soviet Union	Irina Devina	9.550	9.700	19.250
7	Czechoslovakia	Daniela Bošanská	9.650	9.500	19.150
8	Germany	Carmen Rischer	9.600	8.750	18.350

=== Individual Clubs ===
Place	Nation	Name	All Around	Clubs	Total
1	Bulgaria	Anelia Ralenkova	9.800	9.900	19.700
2	Bulgaria	Lilia Ignatova	9.750	9.900	19.650
3	Soviet Union	Irina Devina	9.750	9.800	19.550
4	Bulgaria	Iliana Raeva	9.700	9.800	19.500
5	Czechoslovakia	Daniela Bošanská	9.600	9.750	19.350
6	Soviet Union	Dalia Kutkaitė	9.600	9.650	19.250
7	Spain	Marta Bobo	9.600	9.500	19.100
7	Germany	Carmen Rischer	9.500	9.600	19.100

=== Individual Ribbon ===
Place	Nation	Name	All Around	Ribbon	Total
1	Soviet Union	Irina Devina	9.800	9.900	19.700
2	Bulgaria	Iliana Raeva	9.800	9.800	19.600
3	Bulgaria	Anelia Ralenkova	9.750	9.800	19.550
4	Bulgaria	Lilia Ignatova	9.700	9.800	19.500
5	Germany	Carmen Rischer	9.600	9.700	19.300
6	Soviet Union	Dalia Kutkaitė	9.500	9.700	19.200
7	Czechoslovakia	Iveta Havlíčková	9.500	9.550	19.050
8	Germany	Regina Weber	9.400	9.600	19.000

== Group ==
=== Preliminaries ===
Place	Nation	First Exercise	Second Exercise	Total
1	Bulgaria	19.400	19.550	38.950
2	USSR	19.200	19.300	38.500
3	Czechoslovakia	18.850	18.950	37.800
4	Japan	18.700	18.750	37.450
5	Spain	18.150	18.550	36.700
6	West Germany	18.150	18.500	36.650
7	Poland	18.200	18.400	36.600
8	Italy	18.200	18.200	36.400
9	Canada	17.850	18.100	35.950
10	Norway	17.650	18.250	35.900
11	United States	17.600	18.150	35.750
12	Hungary	17.250	18.350	35.600
12	Netherlands	17.500	18.100	35.600
14	Austria	17.550	17.700	35.250
15	Switzerland	17.500	17.600	35.100
16	China	17.450	17.500	34.950
17	Sweden	17.350	17.500	34.850
18	New Zealand	16.900	17.450	34.350
19	Great Britain	17.100	17.150	34.250
20	Brazil	16.600	17.100	34.000
21	Australia	16.750	16.350	33.100

=== Finals ===
Place	Nation	Average	Final	Total
1	Bulgaria	19.475	19.100	38.575
2	USSR	19.250	19.100	38.350
3	Czechoslovakia	18.900	19.250	38.150
4	Japan	18.725	19.200	37.925
5	West Germany	18.325	18.750	37.075
6	Poland	18.300	18.650	36.950
7	Spain	18.350	18.550	36.900
8	Italy	18.200	18.250	36.450
