= 1982 Rhythmic Gymnastics European Championships =

- Location: Stavanger, Norway
- Start date: 28 October 1982
- End date: 31 October 1982

The 1982 Rhythmic Gymnastics European Championships is the 3rd edition of the Rhythmic Gymnastics European Championships, which took place from 28 October 1982 to 31 October 1982 in Stavanger, Norway.

== Medal winners ==
Event	Gold	Silver	Bronze
Individual
All-Around	Anelia Ralenkova; Bulgaria; Dalia Kutkaite; Soviet Union	none awarded	Iliana Raeva; Bulgaria
Rope	Anelia Ralenkova; Bulgaria	Iliana Raeva; Bulgaria; Irina Devina; Soviet Union	none awarded
Hoop	Anelia Ralenkova; Bulgaria	Dalia Kutkaite; Soviet Union	Iliana Raeva; Bulgaria; Irina Devina; Soviet Union
Clubs	Dalia Kutkaite; Soviet Union	Anelia Ralenkova; Bulgaria	Iliana Raeva; Bulgaria; Irina Devina; Soviet Union
Ribbon	Lilia Ignatova; Bulgaria; Dalia Kutkaite; Soviet Union	none awarded	Iliana Raeva; Bulgaria
Groups
All-Around	Soviet Union; Elena Bukreeva	Bulgaria	Czechoslovakia

== Medal table ==
Rank	Nation	Gold	Silver	Bronze	Total
1	Bulgaria (BUL)	4	3	4	11
2	Soviet Union (URS)	4	2	2	8
3	Czechoslovakia (TCH)	0	0	1	1
Totals (3 entries)		8	5	7	20
