= Ekaterina Serebrianskaya =

Ukrainian rhythmic gymnast

Ekaterina Serebrianskaya Катерина Серебрянська
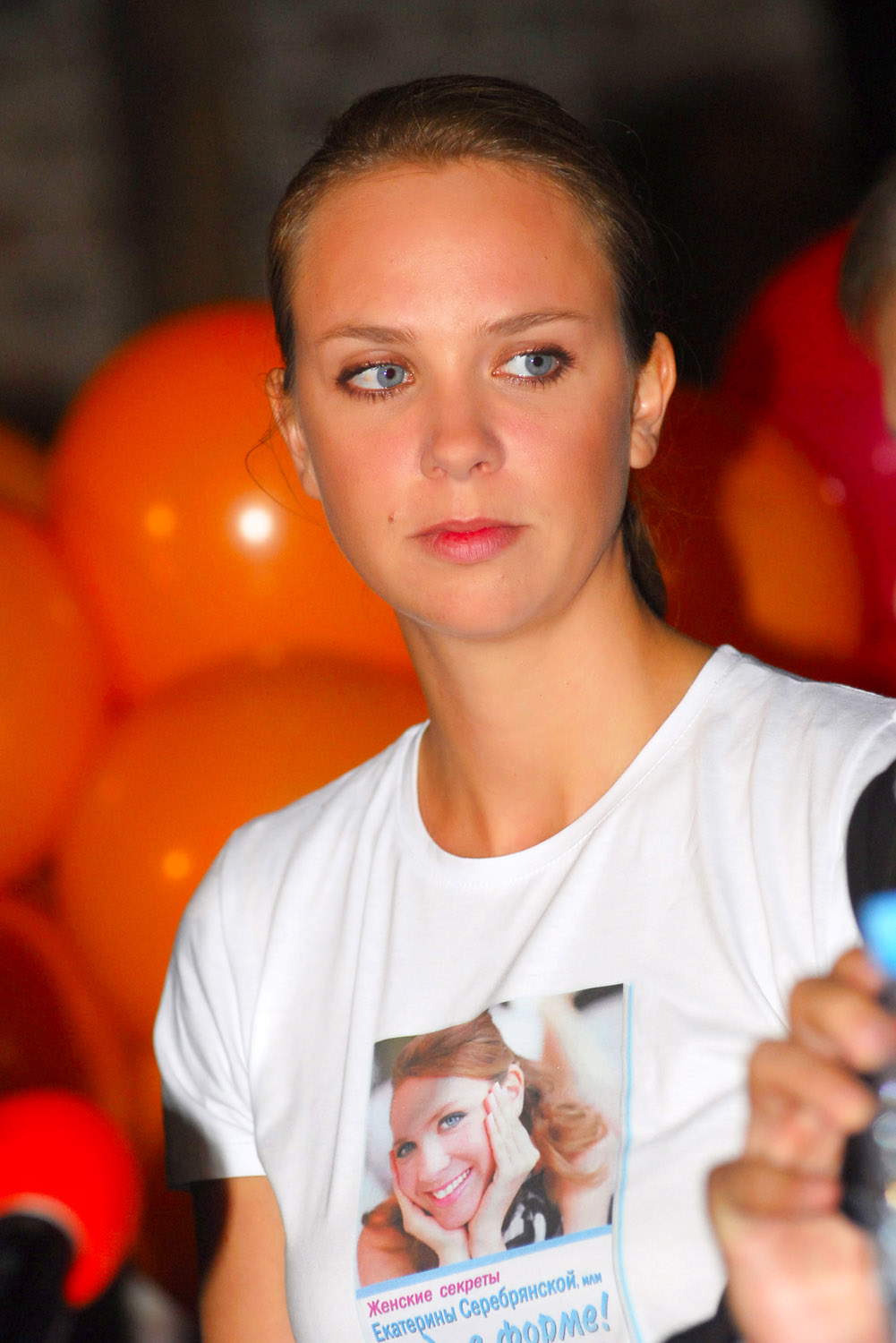

Personal information
- Born: 25 October 1977 (age 49) Simferopol, Crimean Oblast, Ukrainian SSR, Soviet Union
- Height: 180 cm (5 ft 11 in)

Gymnastics career
- Discipline: Rhythmic gymnastics
- Country represented: Ukraine
- Retired: 1998
Medal record
International gymnastics competitions
Event	1st	2nd	3rd
Olympic Games	1	0	0
World Championships	8	6	4
European Championships	10	5	3
European Cup Final	3	0	0
Grand Prix Final	3	0	0
Goodwill Games	2	1	2
Junior European Championships	2	1	0
Total	29	13	9
Representing Ukraine
Rhythmic Gymnastics
Olympic Games
Gold medal – first place	1996 Atlanta	All-around
World Championships
Gold medal – first place	1993 Alicante	Rope
Gold medal – first place	1994 Paris	Hoop
Gold medal – first place	1994 Paris	Ball
Gold medal – first place	1994 Paris	Clubs
Gold medal – first place	1994 Paris	Ribbon
Gold medal – first place	1995 Vienna	All-around
Gold medal – first place	1995 Vienna	Ball
Gold medal – first place	1996 Budapest	Ball
Silver medal – second place	1992 Brussels	3 ropes/3 balls
Silver medal – second place	1993 Alicante	All-around
Silver medal – second place	1993 Alicante	Hoop
Silver medal – second place	1993 Alicante	Team
Silver medal – second place	1995 Vienna	Rope
Silver medal – second place	1996 Budapest	Rope
Bronze medal – third place	1993 Alicante	Ball
Bronze medal – third place	1993 Alicante	Ribbon
Bronze medal – third place	1995 Vienna	Team
Bronze medal – third place	1995 Vienna	Clubs
European Championships
Gold medal – first place	1994 Thessaloniki	Ball
Gold medal – first place	1994 Thessaloniki	Ribbon
Gold medal – first place	1994 Thessaloniki	Team
Gold medal – first place	1996 Asker	All-Around
Gold medal – first place	1996 Asker	Rope
Gold medal – first place	1996 Asker	Ball
Gold medal – first place	1996 Asker	Ribbon
Gold medal – first place	1996 Asker	Team
Gold medal – first place	1997 Patras	Rope
Gold medal – first place	1998 Porto	Hoop
Silver medal – second place	1996 Asker	Clubs
Silver medal – second place	1997 Patras	Clubs
Silver medal – second place	1997 Patras	Ribbon
Silver medal – second place	1998 Porto	Team
Silver medal – second place	1998 Porto	Rope
Bronze medal – third place	1994 Thessaloniki	Clubs
Bronze medal – third place	1997 Patras	All-around
Bronze medal – third place	1998 Porto	Ribbon
European Team Championships
Bronze medal – third place	1997 Paris	Team
European Cup Final
Gold medal – first place	1995 Telford	All-around
Gold medal – first place	1995 Telford	Rope
Gold medal – first place	1995 Telford	Clubs
Grand Prix Final
Gold medal – first place	1994 Vienna	All-around
Gold medal – first place	1995 Deventer	All-around
Gold medal – first place	1996 Vienna	All-around
Goodwill Games
Gold medal – first place	1994 Saint Petersburg	Clubs
Gold medal – first place	1994 Saint Petersburg	Ribbon
Silver medal – second place	1994 Saint Petersburg	All-around
Bronze medal – third place	1994 Saint Petersburg	Hoop
Bronze medal – third place	1994 Saint Petersburg	Ball
Representing Soviet Union
Junior European Championships
Gold medal – first place	1991 Lisbon	Team
Gold medal – first place	1991 Lisbon	Ball
Silver medal – second place	1991 Lisbon	Hoop
Event	1st	2nd	3rd
Grand Prix	18	2	2
Total	18	2	2

Ekaterina Serebrianskaya^{[a]} (or Serebrianska; born 25 October 1977 in Simferopol) is a Ukrainian former individual rhythmic gymnast. She is the 1996 Olympics gold medalist, the 1995 World All-around champion, the 1996 European All-around champion, and three time Grand Prix Final All-around champion.

== Life and career ==
Serebrianskaya was born in Simferopol, Ukrainian SSR, Soviet Union. She started gymnastics in 1982 at age 4, with her mother Liubov as her coach at the Gratsia club in Simferopol. She later moved to the Ukrainian capital, Kyiv, to train at the Deriugina School.

In 1994, Serebrianskaya participated at the 1994 Goodwill Games in Saint Petersburg and won gold medals in clubs and ribbon, a silver medal in all-around and bronze medals in hoop and ball.

Serebrianskaya tied Bulgaria's Maria Petrova for the all-round title at the 1995 World Championships in Vienna, Austria. She also won several individual apparatus titles: rope at the 1993 World Championships in Alicante, Spain; hoop (tied with Belarusian Larissa Lukyanenko and Bulgarian Maria Petrova), ball (tied with Ukrainian teammate Olena Vitrychenko), clubs and ribbon in the 1994 World Championships in Paris, France; ball (tied with Russians Yanina Batyrchina and Amina Zaripova) at the 1995 Worlds in Vienna, Austria; and again in 1996 in Hungary. Her sweep of all 4 event finals golds at the 1994 World Championships is one of only two times in history this has been achieved, the other being Alexandra Timoshenko, and was all the more miracle after major mistakes in the All Around final put her in 4th place after being favored to win (ironically Timoshenko in 1991 also failed to win the All Around title, coming 2nd to teammate Oksana Skaldina, prior to sweeping the event final golds). She also won the 1996 European all-round title, together with the team gold, and gold on rope, ball and ribbon finals.

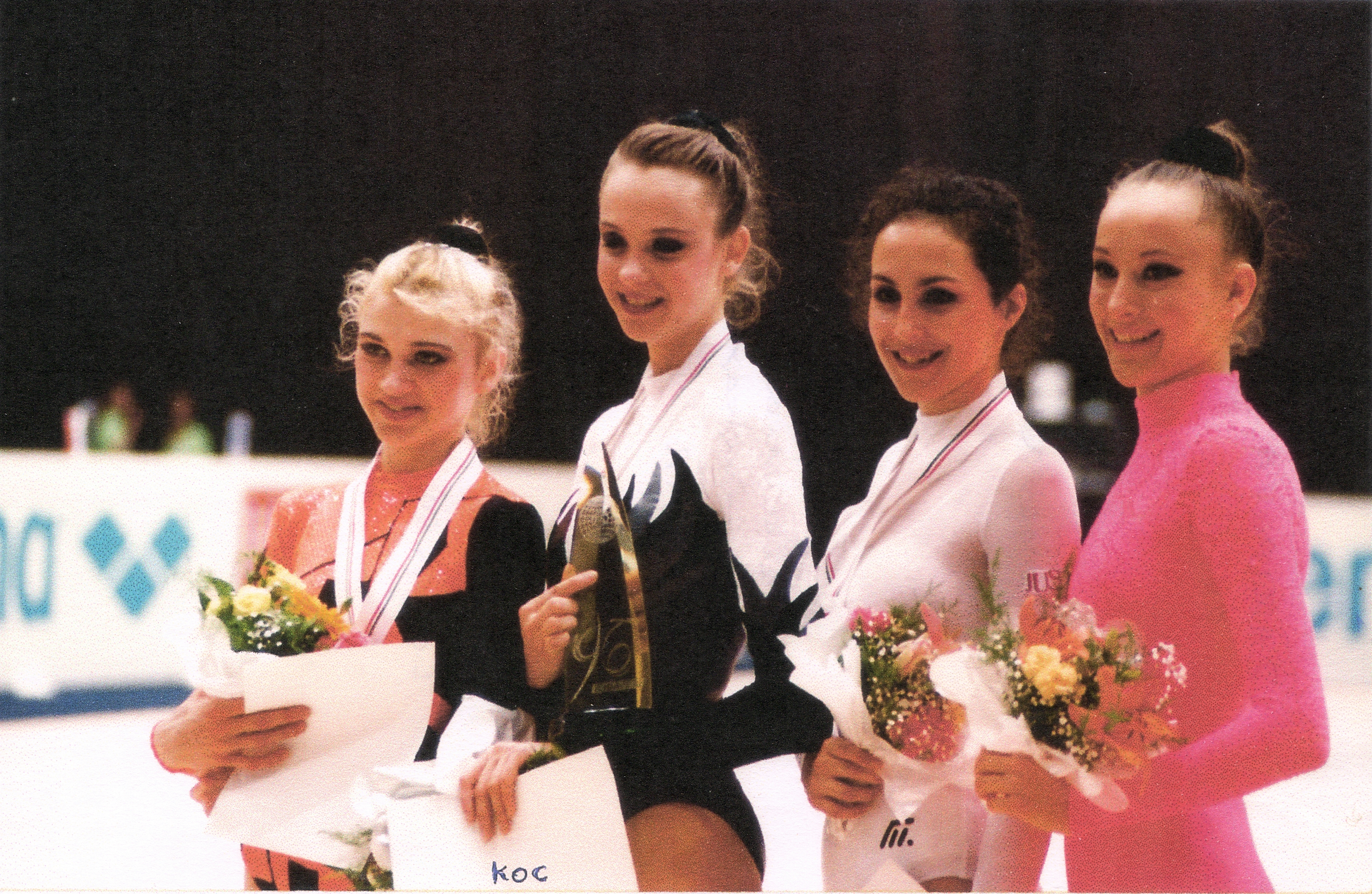
Serebrinaskaya at the 1996 World Championships

As the gold medal favorite after her dominance in 1994, 1995, and early 1996, at the 1996 Atlanta Olympics, Serebrianska's technical strength, cleanliness, difficulty, and mature presentation won her the gold medal, although she had a slight fumble with the ribbon before her final toss. She was ahead of her closest rival, Russia's Yanina Batyrchina by 0.150 points going into the ribbon routine, who competed before her and dropped the ribbon.

Serebrianska, Alina Kabaeva, Olexandra Tymoshenko and Evgenia Kanaeva are the only rhythmic gymnasts to win World, European and Olympic titles.

At the 1997 European Championships in Greece, Serebrianskaya dropped a club at the end of her all-round clubs routine (9.825), but scores of 9.950 on both the rope and ribbon, and a 9.912 on hoop gave her an accumulated score of 29.637 and hence the bronze medal by 0.012 ahead of French competitor, Eva Serrano. In the apparatus finals, she won the gold in the rope event with a perfect 10.000, and took silver in the clubs and ribbon events. She did not compete at the 1997 World Championships due to an illness suffered by her mother. In her final major competition, the 1998 European Championships, she reached each of the apparatus final events. She won gold in the hoop final (9.950) and silver in rope (9.933). She also won bronze in the ribbon event (9.933), tying with the same score as Evgenia Pavlina of Belarus and Yanina Batyrchina of Russia, but winning the medal due to the new tie-breaker scoring system. She placed 6th (lost in the tie-breaker to Belarusian, Yulia Raskina) in the all-round final.

Serebrianskaya retired from rhythmic gymnastics in 1998.

== Records ==
- Serebrianskaya became the first female rhythmic gymnast to hold the European, World, and Olympic all-round titles at the same time. This record was tied by Alina Kabaeva at the 2004 Athens Olympics and Evgenia Kanaeva at the 2012 London Olympics.
- Serebrianskaya has won gold medals in all of the apparatus in a single World Championship ( and has won on all five apparatus: rope, hoop, ball, clubs and ribbon), a record tied only by Bianka Panova, Oxana Kostina and Evgenia Kanaeva.
- Serebrianskaya is tied with Evgenia Kanaeva and Lilia Ignatova for three World gold medals in ball.
- Serebrianskaya is only one of the three rhythmic gymnasts ( with Alina Kabaeva and Evgenia Kanaeva ) to win all the Grand-slam titles (Olympics, World Championships, European Championships, World Cup Final and Grand Prix Final).

== Routine music information ==
Year	Apparatus	Music title
1998	Hoop	Nature Boy by Nat King Cole
1998	Clubs	Summertime from Porgy and Bess by George Gershwin
1998	Rope	Jugglers in Obsidian by Andreas Vollenwieder
1998	Ribbon	Indigo Bay
1997	Hoop	?
1997	Clubs	Summertime from Porgy and Bess by George Gershwin
1997	Rope	Tipsy Bumblebee by Günter Noris Gala Big Band
1997	Ribbon	Nature Boy by Nat King Cole
1996	Ball	Atrocious Romance
1996	Rope	Kalinka / Katyusha (Russian traditional)
1996	Clubs	Nur kein genieren from Elisabeth
1996	Ribbon	Tipsy Bumblebee by Günter Noris Gala Big Band
1995	Ball	Dream by Vladimir Bustriakov
1995	Rope	Kalinka / Katyusha (Russian traditional)
1995	Clubs	Nur kein genieren from Elisabeth
1995	Ribbon	Rock'n'Roll by Vladimir Bustriakov
1994	Ball	Ne me quitte pas by Jacques Brel
1994	Hoop	Besame Mucho by Consuela Velazques
1994	Clubs	the Sleeping Beauty by Pyotr Tchaikovsky
1994	Ribbon	Theme from West Side Story by Leonard Bernstein
1993	Ball	Ne me quitte pas by Jacques Brel
1993	Hoop	Phantom of the Opera by Andrew Lloyd Webber
1993	Clubs	March of the Trolls (remix) by Edvard Grieg
1993	Ribbon	Macavity, the Mystery Cat from Cats by Andrew Lloyd Webber

== Detailed Olympic results ==
Year	Competition Description	Location	Music	Apparatus	Score-Final	Score-Qualifying
1996	Olympics	Atlanta		All-around	39.683	39.113
1996	Olympics	Atlanta	Tipsy Bumblebee	Ribbon	9.833	9.699
1996	Olympics	Atlanta	Kalinka/Katyusha	Rope	9.950	9.799
1996	Olympics	Atlanta	Atrocious Romance	Ball	9.950	9.783
1996	Olympics	Atlanta	Nur kein genieren	Clubs	9.950	9.832

== Notes and references ==
a.	Ukrainian: Катерина Олегівна Серебрянська, Kateryna Olehivna Serebrianska. Russian: Екатерина Олеговна Серебрянская, Yekaterina Olegovna Serebryanskaya.
