= Svetlana Louzanova =

Belarusian rhythmic gymnast

Svetlana Luzanova
- Святлана Васільеўна Лузанова
- Full name: Svetlana Vasilyevna Luzanova
- Born: 29 June 1977 (age 49) Minsk
- Height: 166 cm (5 ft 5 in)

Gymnastics career
- Discipline: Rhythmic gymnastics
- Country represented: Belarus; (1995-?)
- Club: Goscomsport
- Head coach: Svetlana Luzanova
- Retired: yes
Medal record
Representing Belarus
Rhythmic Gymnastics
World Championships
| Gold medal – first place | 1996 Budapest | 5 Hoops |
| Bronze medal – third place | 1995 Vienna | All-Around |
| Bronze medal – third place | 1995 Vienna | 5 Hoops |
| Bronze medal – third place | 1996 Budapest | All-Around |
| Bronze medal – third place | 1996 Budapest | 3 Balls + 2 Ribbons |

Svetlana Vasilyevna Luzanova (Russian: Святлана Васільеўна Лузанова; born 29 June 1977) is a Belarusian retired rhythmic gymnast and coach.

== Biography ==
In 1995 Luzanova competed at the European Championships in Prague, helping the Belarusian group achieve 4th place overall. In September the group won bronze in the All-Around and with 5 hoops at the World Championships in Vienna, thus earning a spot for the following year's Olympics.

In June 1996 she took part in the World Championships in Budapest, winning bronze in the All-Around and with 3 balls & 2 ribbons as well as gold with 5 hoops. In August of that year she was selected for the Olympic Games in Atlanta along Natalia Boudilo, Olga Demskaia, Oxana Jdanovitch, Halina Malashenka and Alesia Pokhodina. There she was 4th in qualification, advancing to the final round, and finishing 6th in the final.

After her retirement she coached first in her native Belarus, then at the Maribor club in Slovenia where she is working as of 2023.
