= Natalia Zhadanova =

Ukrainian rhythmic gymnast (born 1981)

- Born: 30 June 1981 (age 45) Odessa, Ukrainian SSR, Soviet Union (now - Odesa, Ukraine)

Gymnastics career
- Discipline: Rhythmic gymnastics
- Country represented: Ukraine
- Club: Deriugins School
- Head coach: Albina Deriugina
- Assistant coach: Iryna Deriugina
- Retired: yes
Medal record
Rhythmic gymnastics
Representing Ukraine
World Championships
Bronze medal – third place	1996 Budapest	5 hoops
Bronze medal – third place	1998 Seville	5 balls
Bronze medal – third place	1998 Seville	3 ribbons + 2 hoops
European Championships
Silver medal – second place	1997 Patras	5 balls
Bronze medal – third place	1997 Patras	Group all-around

Natalia Zhadanova (born 30 June 1981) is a former group Ukrainian rhythmic gymnast.

== Career ==
In 1996, Zhadanova competed at the World Championships in Budapest as a member of the group finishing 5th in the all-around, 4th with 3 balls & 2 ribbons and winning bronze with 5 hoops.

The following year, at the European Championships in Patras, she won a silver medal in 5 balls and a bronze one in the group all-around.

In 1998, Zhadanova was again in the group, at the World Championships in Seville she was 4th in the group all-around and won bronze in the 5 balls and 3 ribbons & 2 hoops' event finals.
