= 1994 World Rhythmic Gymnastics Championships =

- Location: Paris, France
- Start date: 6 October 1994
- End date: 9 October 1994

The XVIII World Rhythmic Gymnastics Championships were held in Paris, France on 6–9 October, 1994. The focus of the competition was on groups, though a limited number of individuals also competed. 29 groups competed.

Bulgarian Maria Petrova won her second consecutive all-around title, then announced her retirement from competition. (However, she returned to win a third consecutive title at the 1995 World Championships.) She won the competition 0.05 points ahead of tied bronze medalists Larisa Lukyanenko and Amina Zaripova. Ukrainian gymnast Kateryna Serebrianska dropped her hoop in the all-around to finish fourth, but she won every apparatus final. 1994 junior European champion Olga Gontar placed 5th.

In the group competition, Russia won both the all-around and six ropes final, while the Spanish group won silver and both event final bronze medals. Bulgaria placed third in the all-around, then won the four hoops and two pairs of clubs final.

== Medal winners ==
Event	Gold	Silver	Bronze
Individual
Hoop	Larissa Lukyanenko (BLR); Maria Petrova (BUL); Kateryna Serebrianska (UKR)	None awarded	None awarded
Ball	Kateryna Serebrianska (UKR); Elena Vitrychenko (UKR)	None awarded	Maria Petrova (BUL)
Clubs	Kateryna Serebrianska (UKR)	Maria Petrova (BUL)	Amina Zaripova (RUS)
Ribbon	Kateryna Serebrianska (UKR)	Maria Petrova (BUL); Elena Vitrychenko (UKR); Amina Zaripova (RUS)	None awarded
All-Around	Maria Petrova (BUL)	Larissa Lukyanenko (BLR); Amina Zaripova (RUS)	None awarded
Groups
All-Around	Russia	Spain; Marta Baldó; Lorena Barbadillo; Paula Cabo; Estela Giménez; Regina Guati; Amaia Uriondo; María Pardo; Violeta Giménez	Bulgaria
6 Ropes Final	Russia	Bulgaria	Spain; Marta Baldó; Lorena Barbadillo; Paula Cabo; Estela Giménez; Regina Guati; Amaia Uriondo
4 Hoops + 2 Clubs Final	Bulgaria	Russia	Spain; Marta Baldó; Lorena Barbadillo; Paula Cabo; Estela Giménez; Regina Guati; Amaia Uriondo

== Individual ==
=== All-Around ===
Place	Nation	Name	Total
1	Bulgaria	Maria Petrova	38.900
2	(Belarus)	Larissa Lukianenko	38.850
2	Russia	Amina Zaripova	38.850
4	Ukraine	Ekaterina Serebrianskaya	38.725
5	(Belarus)	Olga Gontar	38.675
6	Ukraine	Elena Vitrichenko	38.625
7	France	Eva Serrano	37.975
8	Bulgaria	Diana Popova	37.750
9	Russia	Yanina Batyrchina	37.425
10	(Germany)	Magdalena Brzeska	37.400

=== Ball ===
Place	Nation	Name	Result
1	Ukraine	Ekaterina Serebrianskaya	9.875
1	Ukraine	Elena Vitrichenko	9.875
3	Bulgaria	Maria Petrova	9.825
4	Russia	Amina Zaripova	9.800
5	(Belarus)	Olga Gontar	9.725
6	France	Eva Serrano	9.650
7	(Belarus)	Larissa Lukianenko	9.200
8	Bulgaria	Diana Popova	8.875

=== Hoop ===
Place	Nation	Name	Result
1	(Belarus)	Larissa Lukianenko	9.875
1	Bulgaria	Maria Petrova	9.875
1	Ukraine	Ekaterina Serebrianskaya	9.875
4	Ukraine	Elena Vitrichenko	9.825
5	(Belarus)	Olga Gontar	9.750
6	Bulgaria	Diana Popova	9.575
7	France	Eva Serrano	9.525
8	Russia	Amina Zaripova	8.475

=== Clubs ===
Place	Nation	Name	Result
1	Ukraine	Ekaterina Serebrianskaya	9.900
2	Bulgaria	Maria Petrova	9.825
3	Russia	Amina Zaripova	9.800
4	(Belarus)	Larissa Lukianenko	9.750
5	(Belarus)	Olga Gontar	9.700
5	Ukraine	Elena Vitrichenko	9.700
7	France	Eva Serrano	9.650
8	Bulgaria	Diana Popova	9.600

=== Ribbon ===
Place	Nation	Name	Result
1	Ukraine	Ekaterina Serebrianskaya	9.900
2	Bulgaria	Maria Petrova	9.850
2	Russia	Amina Zaripova	9.850
2	Ukraine	Elena Vitrichenko	9.850
5	(Belarus)	Larissa Lukianenko	9.800
6	(Belarus)	Olga Gontar	9.700
6	Russia	Yanina Batyrchina	9.700
8	France	Eva Serrano	9.225

== Groups ==
=== All-Around ===
Place	Nation	6 Ropes	4 Hoops, 2 Clubs	Total
1	Russia	19.425	19.500	38.925
2	Spain	19.350	19.350	38.700
3	Bulgaria	19.425	19.250	38.675
4	Belarus	19.100	19.150	38.250
5	Japan	19.100	19.025	38.125
6	China	19.000	18.850	37.850
6	France	19.100	18.750	37.850
8	Greece	18.925	18.850	37.775
9	Germany			
10	South Korea			
11	Hungary			
12	Ukraine			
13	....			

=== 6 Ropes Final ===
Place	Nation	Total
1	Russia	19.587
2	Bulgaria	19.537
3	Spain	19.400
4	France	19.200
5	Japan	19.150
6	Belarus	19.075
7	China	18.875
8	Greece	18.800

=== 4 Hoops + 2 Clubs Final ===
Place	Nation	Total
1	Bulgaria	19.550
2	Russia	19.400
3	Spain	19.325
4	Belarus	19.200
5	Japan	19.125
6	France	19.050
7	China	19.000
8	Greece	18.825
