= Natalia Boudilo =

Belarusian rhythmic gymnast (born 1979)

- Наталля Мікалаеўна Буділо
- Full name: Natalia Mikalayeuna Boudilo
- Born: 8 August 1979 (age 47) Minsk
- Height: 162 cm (5 ft 4 in)

Gymnastics career
- Discipline: Rhythmic gymnastics
- Country represented: Belarus; (1995-?)
- Club: Goscomsport
- Retired: yes
Medal record
Representing Belarus
Rhythmic Gymnastics
World Championships
Gold medal – first place	1996 Budapest	5 Hoops
Bronze medal – third place	1995 Vienna	All-Around
Bronze medal – third place	1995 Vienna	5 Hoops
Bronze medal – third place	1996 Budapest	All-Around
Bronze medal – third place	1996 Budapest	3 Balls + 2 Ribbons
European Championships
Gold medal – first place	1997 Patras	3 Balls & 2 Ribbons

Natalia Mikalayeuna Boudilo (Belarusian: Наталля Мікалаеўна Буділо; born 8 August 1979) is a Belarusian retired rhythmic gymnast. She represented Belarus as part of the national senior group.

== Career ==
In 1995 Boudilo competed at the European Championships in Prague, helping the Belarusian group achieve 4th place overall. In September the group won bronze in the All-Around and with 5 hoops at the World Championships in Vienna, thus earning a spot for the following year's Olympics.

In June 1996 she took part in the World Championships in Budapest, winning bronze in the All-Around and with 3 balls & 2 ribbons as well as gold with 5 hoops. In August of that year she was selected for the Olympic Games in Atlanta along Oxana Jdanovitch, Svetlana Louzanova, Olga Demskaia, Halina Malashenka and Alesia Pokhodina. There she was 4th in qualification, advancing to the final round, and finishing 6th in the final.

At the 1997 European Championships in Patras she won gold with 3 balls & 2 ribbons. With these results she was awarded the title of master of sports of Belarus of international class.

After her retirement she started working as a coach, as of 2019 she coaches at the "Princess of Sports" club.
