= Halina Malashenka =

Belarusian rhythmic gymnast (born 1980)

- Галіна Генадзеўна Малашенкa
- Full name: Halina Henadzeuna Malashenka
- Born: 1 March 1980 (age 46) Minsk
- Height: 164 cm (5 ft 5 in)

Gymnastics career
- Discipline: Rhythmic gymnastics
- Country represented: Belarus; (1995-?)
- Club: Goscomsport
- Retired: yes
Medal record
Representing Belarus
Rhythmic Gymnastics
World Championships
| Gold medal – first place | 1996 Budapest | 5 Hoops |
| Bronze medal – third place | 1995 Vienna | All-Around |
| Bronze medal – third place | 1995 Vienna | 5 Hoops |
| Bronze medal – third place | 1996 Budapest | All-Around |
| Bronze medal – third place | 1996 Budapest | 3 Balls + 2 Ribbons |

Halina Henadzeuna Malashenka (Belarusian: Галіна Генадзеўна Малашенкa; born 1 March 1980) is a Belarusian retired rhythmic gymnast. She represented Belarus as part of the national senior group.

== Career ==
In 1995 Malashenka competed at the European Championships in Prague, helping the Belarusian group achieve 4th place overall. In September the group won bronze in the All-Around and with 5 hoops at the World Championships in Vienna, thus earning a spot for the following year's Olympics.

In June 1996 she took part in the World Championships in Budapest, winning bronze in the All-Around and with 3 balls & 2 ribbons as well as gold with 5 hoops. In August of that year she was selected for the Olympic Games in Atlanta along Natalia Boudilo, Svetlana Louzanova, Olga Demskaia, Alesia Pokhodina and Oxana Jdanovitch. There she was 4th in qualification, advancing to the final round, and finishing 6th in the final.
