= Amina Zaripova =

Russian rhythmic gymnast

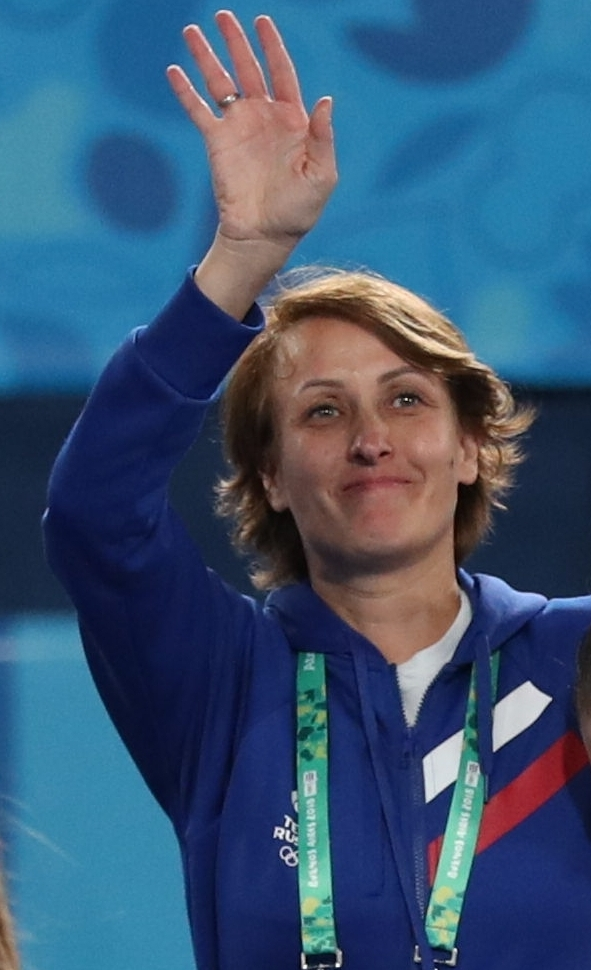
- Zaripova at the 2018 Summer Youth Olympic Games in Buenos Aires.

Personal information
- Born: 10 August 1976 (age 50) Chirchik, Uzbek SSR, Soviet Union
- Height: 176 cm (5 ft 9 in)

Gymnastics career
- Discipline: Rhythmic gymnastics
- Country represented: Russia
- Gym: Olympic Village
- Head coach: Irina Viner
- Retired: Yes
Medal record
International gymnastics competitions
Event	1st	2nd	3rd
World Championships	5	4	3
European Championships	3	0	6
Grand Prix Final	0	0	1
Summer Universiade	1	2	1
Goodwill Games	3	1	1
Total	12	7	12
Representing Russia
Rhythmic Gymnastics
World Championships
Gold medal – first place	1995 Vienna	Ball
Gold medal – first place	1995 Vienna	Clubs
Gold medal – first place	1995 Vienna	Team
Gold medal – first place	1996 Budapest	Clubs
Gold medal – first place	1997 Berlin	Team
Silver medal – second place	1994 Paris	All-around
Silver medal – second place	1994 Paris	Ribbon
Silver medal – second place	1995 Vienna	Ribbon
Silver medal – second place	1996 Budapest	Ball
Bronze medal – third place	1993 Alicante	All-around
Bronze medal – third place	1993 Alicante	Team
Bronze medal – third place	1994 Paris	Clubs
European Championships
Gold medal – first place	1994 Thessaloniki	Ball
Gold medal – first place	1994 Thessaloniki	Clubs
Gold medal – first place	1996 Asker	Clubs
Bronze medal – third place	1992 Stuttgart	Team
Bronze medal – third place	1994 Thessaloniki	All-around
Bronze medal – third place	1994 Thessaloniki	Hoop
Bronze medal – third place	1994 Thessaloniki	Ribbon
Bronze medal – third place	1996 Asker	All-around
Bronze medal – third place	1998 Porto	Team
Junior European Championships
Gold medal – first place	1991 Lisbon	Team
Bronze medal – third place	1991 Lisbon	All-around
Bronze medal – third place	1991 Lisbon	Clubs
European Cup Final
Gold medal – first place	1995 Telford	Ribbon
Silver medal – second place	1995 Telford	Clubs
Bronze medal – third place	1993 Málaga	Hoop
Bronze medal – third place	1993 Málaga	Clubs
Bronze medal – third place	1995 Telford	Rope
Grand Prix Final
Bronze medal – third place	1994 Vienna	All-around
Summer Universiade
Gold medal – first place	1997 Sicily	Clubs
Silver medal – second place	1997 Sicily	Rope
Silver medal – second place	1997 Sicily	Ribbon
Bronze medal – third place	1997 Sicily	All-round
Goodwill Games
Gold medal – first place	1994 St.Petersburg	All-round
Gold medal – first place	1994 St.Petersburg	Ball
Gold medal – first place	1994 St.Petersburg	Hoop
Silver medal – second place	1994 St.Petersburg	Clubs
Bronze medal – third place	1994 St.Petersburg	Ribbon

Amina Vasilovna Zaripova (Russian: Амина Василовна Зарипова; Tatar: Әминә Васил кызы Зарипова, born 10 August 1976) is a retired Russian individual rhythmic gymnast who now works as an elite coach. She is the 1994 World all-around silver medalist, 1993 World all-around bronze medalist and a two-time (1996, 1994) European all-around bronze medalist. She finished fourth at the 1996 Olympic Games in Atlanta.

== Personal life ==
Amina Zaripova is of Tatar descent. She is married to Alexei Kortnev, lead singer of Neschastny Sluchai, with whom she has two sons, Arseniy and Afanasiy, and two daughters, Aksiniya and Agafiya. She speaks Russian and English.

== Gymnastics career ==
Zaripova studied ballet until the age of ten, when she caught the eye of then-Uzbek head coach Irina Viner. When Viner relocated to Moscow to become the Russian head coach, Zaripova followed. Early in her career, she was called the second Zaripova, as she shares a last name with Viner's first international gymnast, Venera Zaripova.

At the 1991 European Junior Championships, Zaripova won her first set of medals—gold for the team event and bronze in the all-around and clubs final.

After the death of Oxana Kostina, Zaripova became the leader of the Russian national team. Zaripova, along with Julia Rosliakova and Inessa Gizikova, won bronze in the team event at the 1993 World Championships. Individually, she also won bronze in the all-around. The following year, she placed second at Corbeil-Essonnes International and third at the 1994 European Championships. There she earned four medals in the apparatus finals, gold with ball and clubs and bronze with hoop and ribbon. She also won three titles at the 1994 Goodwill Games in the all-around and with hoop and ball, as well as a silver medal (clubs) and a bronze medal (ribbon).

At that year's World Championships, Zaripova placed second in the all-around. She also came in third with clubs and second with ribbon. She was the lead gymnast going into the final apparatus of the all-around, but a mistake in her final routine cost her the gold medal, which went to the reigning World champion, Maria Petrova.

In the following years, she was overshadowed by rising Russian stars Yanina Batyrchina and Natalia Lipkovskaya. At the 1995 World Championships, Batyrchina won the bronze medal, while Zaripova finished fourth. Zaripova finished 4th in the all-around at the 1996 Summer Olympics in Atlanta, narrowly losing to both Ukrainian Olena Vitrychenko and her teammate Yanina Batyrchina, who controversially held on for silver after she made a mistake in her final routine. She finished less than a tenth of a point behind both the silver and bronze medalists.

At the end of 1996, Zaripova underwent surgery to repair a torn left Achilles tendon. She returned to competition in 1997, and her first major competition was the 1997 Summer Universiade, where she won bronze. In October, she won gold in the team event at the 1997 World Championships, and she placed fourth in the all-around qualifications, though she did not enter the final due to the two-per-country rule. She was also part of the Russian team that won the bronze at the 1998 European Championships.

She retired in the fall of 1998 and returned to training four months later. Zaripova's final event was the Schmiden International in March 1999, where she won the all-around as well as a gold medal for her ball exercise and silver for hoop. In an interview around this time, Zaripova mentioned that she thought that "When judges give marks, sometimes the marks aren't true" and the difficulty of competing against younger gymnasts.

== Gymnastics technique ==
Zaripova was known for her extreme flexibility, which she called a "gift from God" rather than something she had trained to achieve. She was sometimes criticized for focusing on tricks demonstrating her flexibility over her performance and musical interpretation and for her very thin appearance.

== Coaching career ==
Zaripova was invited by the Greek Gymnastics Federation to coach their team. She helped prepare the team for the 1999 World Championships, but she ended up returning to Russia shortly afterwards. In addition to publishing her own rhythmic gymnastics magazine, she worked as a coach in Moscow. She gave up coaching for a time after the birth of her fourth child to spend more time with her children. She was the personal coach of Rita Mamun and helped her win gold in the all-around at the 2016 Summer Olympics; Mamun's training leading up to the Olympics, including her relationship with Zaripova, was profiled in the documentary Over the Limit.

At the end of 2023, she was asked to coach in China. Zaripova accepted the offer and became the head of the national individual team, on the stipulation that she could take her athletes to compete abroad, as Chinese gymnasts rarely performed either within China or at international competitions. They offered her a four year contract, but she agreed to stay only for one year.

In December 2025, it was announced that she would join the Fabriano Gymnastics club in Italy to coach, among others, World champion Sofia Raffaeli.

Notable trainees include:

- Margarita Mamun – 2016 Olympic champion, twice all-around World silver medalist and three-time Russian National all-around champion.
- Daria Trubnikova – 2018 Youth Olympics Champion, 2018 European Junior clubs champion and 2019 Grand Prix Final all-around gold medalist.
- Maria Sergeeva – 2018 Grand Prix Final all-around bronze medalist and 2016 European Junior hoop champion.
- Yana Lukonina – 2010 World team gold medalist and 2010 Russian National all-around bronze medalist.
- Wang Qi - 2025 Junior World silver medalist with ball, two-time Asian Junior all-around champion.
- Wang Zihan
- Sofia Raffaeli
- Anna Piergentili

== Detailed Olympic results ==
Year	Competition description	Location	Music	Apparatus	Score-Final	Score-Qualifying
1996	Olympics	Atlanta		All-around	39.265	38.748
1996	Olympics	Atlanta	Kitri, Entrance, Coda music from Don Quixote by Leon Minkus	Ribbon	9.832	9.750
1996	Olympics	Atlanta	Theme from Prince Igor by Alexander Borodin	Rope	9.783	9.716
1996	Olympics	Atlanta	At the Circus / Adagio of Spartacus and Phrygia music from Spartacus by Aram Khatchaturian	Ball	9.866	9.699
1996	Olympics	Atlanta	Ole Guapa by Malando	Clubs	9.783	9.583

== See also ==
- Nationality changes in gymnastics
