= Ukraine at the 1997 Summer Universiade =

- IOC code: UKR

in Sicily, Italy 20 - 31 August 1997
- Competitors: 114
- Medals Ranked 2nd: Gold 17 Silver 6 Bronze 4 Total 27

Summer Universiade appearances (overview)
- 1993; 1995; 1997; 1999; 2001; 2003; 2005; 2007; 2009; 2011; 2013; 2015; 2017; 2019; 2021; 2025; 2027

Ukraine competed at the 1997 Summer Universiade in Sicily, Italy, from 20 to 31 August 1995. The country was represented in athletics (41 competitors), fencing (20), swimming (16), football (15), artistic gymnastics (10), diving (6), tennis (4), and rhythmic gymnastics (2). Ukraine did not compete in basketball, volleyball, and water polo. Ukraine was the most successful team in fencing, winning the most medals and a medal in each men's competition. Men's football team finished 4th.

== Medal summary ==
=== Medal by sports ===
Medals by sport
Sport	1st place, gold medalist(s)	2nd place, silver medalist(s)	3rd place, bronze medalist(s)	Total
Athletics	5	4	0	9
Fencing	4	1	2	7
Swimming	4	1	0	5
Rhythmic gymnastics	4	0	1	5
Tennis	0	0	1	1
Total	17	6	4	27

=== Medalists ===
Medal	Name	Sport	Event
Gold	Yuriy Bilonoh	Athletics	Men's shot put
Gold	Iryna Nedelenko	Athletics	Women's 800 metres
Gold	Tetyana Tereshchuk	Athletics	Women's 400 metres hurdles
Gold	Olena Shekhovtsova	Athletics	Women's long jump
Gold	Olena Hovorova	Athletics	Women's triple jump
Gold	Serhiy Holubytskyi; Oleh Matseychuk; Oleksiy Bryzhalov	Fencing	Men's team foil
Gold	Oleksandr Horbachuk	Fencing	Men's individual épée
Gold	Oleksandr Horbachuk; Oleksandr Kariuchenko	Fencing	Men's team épée
Gold	Vadym Gutzeit	Fencing	Men's individual sabre
Gold	Olena Vitrychenko	Rhythmic gymnastics	Individual all-around
Gold	Olena Vitrychenko	Rhythmic gymnastics	Individual rope
Gold	Olena Vitrychenko	Rhythmic gymnastics	Individual hoop
Gold	Olena Vitrychenko	Rhythmic gymnastics	Individual ribbon
Gold	Ihor Snitko	Swimming	Men's 800 m freestyle
Gold	Denys Sylantyev	Swimming	Men's 100 m butterfly
Gold	Denys Sylantyev	Swimming	Men's 200 m butterfly
Gold	Svitlana Bondarenko	Swimming	Women's 100 m breaststroke
Silver	Vadym Kolesnyk	Athletics	Men's hammer throw
Silver	Anzhela Kravchenko	Athletics	Women's 100 metres
Silver	Olena Martson	Athletics	Women's 800 metres
Silver	Viktoriya Vershynina	Athletics	Women's long jump
Silver	Serhiy Holubytskyi	Fencing	Men's individual foil
Silver	Svitlana Bondarenko	Swimming	Women's 200 m breaststroke
Bronze	Vadym Gutzeit; Volodymyr Kaliuzhniy	Fencing	Men's team sabre
Bronze	Viktoriya Titova	Fencing	Women's individual épée
Bronze	Olena Vitrychenko	Rhythmic gymnastics	Individual clubs
Bronze	Volodymyr Lys; Oleksandr Yarmola	Tennis	Men's doubles

== See also ==
- Ukraine at the 1997 Winter Universiade
