= 1993 World Rhythmic Gymnastics Championships =

17th annual World Rhythmic Gymnastics Championships

- Location: Alicante, Spain
- Start date: 4 November 1993
- End date: 7 November 1993

The XVII World Rhythmic Gymnastics Championships were held in Alicante, Spain, on 4–7 November 1993.

Only individuals competed, as the International Gymnastics Federation had voted to alternate individual and group World Championships in 1991. This was done in the hopes of increasing the sport's popularity.

132 gymnasts from 51 countries competed. Maria Petrova won her first all-around title; Larisa Lukyanenko was expected to challenge her for the gold medal, but a foot injury she sustained during training at the competition forced her to withdraw.

== Event format ==
The championships used a new competition format for the team competition, which doubled as individual qualification; countries could send three or four individual gymnasts who would perform a total of ten routines, two routines per apparatus, with a gymnast performing between one and four routines. The total scores of all gymnasts determined the team scores. For individual gymnasts, their top three event scores determined whether they qualified to the all-around final, to which 26 gymnasts (maximum 2 per country) were admitted.

== Individual All-Around ==
Place	Nation	Name	Result
1	Bulgaria	Mariya Petrova	38.975
2	Ukraine	Ekaterina Serebrianskaya	38.775
3	(Russia)	Amina Zaripova	38.400
4	Spain	Carmen Acedo	38.375
5	(Belarus)	Tatiana Ogrizko	38.325
6	Ukraine	Olena Vitrichenko	38.150
7	Spain	Carolina Pascual	38.100
8	(Russia)	Julia Rosliakova	38.075
9	Bulgaria	Julia Baicheva	37.925
10	Romania	Irina Deleanu	37.100
11	Italy	Irene Germini	36.637
12	Germany	Magdalena Brzeska	36.600
13	(Belarus)	Evgenia Pavlina	36.225
14	Japan	Miho Yamada	36.150
15	Japan	Yukari Kawamoto	35.950
16	People's Republic of China	Wang Xiuyun	35.925
17	North Korea	Li Gyong-Hui	35.925
18	Czech Republic	Lenka Oulehlová	35.750
19	France	Eva Serrano	35.725
20	Greece	Areti Sinapidou	35.550
21	Canada	Camille Martens	35.450
22	Poland	Katarzyna Skorupińska	35.375
23	Lithuania	Kristina Kliukevichute	35.300
24	Germany	Nicole Gerdes	34.950
25	Israel	Tali Kedoshim	34.850
26	North Korea	Jong Chun-sil	34.175

== Individual Rope ==
Place	Nation	Name	Result
1	(Ukraine)	Ekaterina Serebrianskaya	9.775
2	(Russia)	Julia Rosliakova	9.650
3	(Bulgaria)	Julia Baicheva	9.500
4	(Bulgaria)	Branimira Dimitrova	9.450
5	(Spain)	Rosabel Espinosa	9.350
5	(Spain)	Amaya Cardeñoso	9.350
5	(Germany)	Magdalena Brzeska	9.350
8	(Ukraine)	Elena Shumskaya	9.325

== Individual Ball ==
Place	Nation	Name	Result
1	(Bulgaria)	Maria Petrova	9.800
2	(Ukraine)	Elena Vitrichenko	9.675
3	(Russia)	Julia Rosliakova	9.650
3	(Ukraine)	Ekaterina Serebrianskaya	9.650
5	(Belarus)	Tatiana Ogrizko	9.625
5	(Spain)	Carmen Acedo	9.625
7	(Russia)	Amina Zaripova	9.600
8	(Spain)	Carolina Pascual	9.575

== Individual Hoop ==
Place	Nation	Name	Result
1	(Bulgaria)	Maria Petrova	9.825
2	(Ukraine)	Ekaterina Serebrianskaya	9.725
3	(Ukraine)	Elena Vitrichenko	9.650
4	(Russia)	Julia Rosliakova	9.625
5	(Belarus)	Tatiana Ogrizko	9.600
5	(Spain)	Carolina Pascual	9.600
7	(Russia)	Amina Zaripova	9.575
8	(Bulgaria)	Julia Baicheva	9.550

== Individual Ribbon ==
Place	Nation	Name	Result
1	(Belarus)	Tatiana Ogrizko	9.775
1	(Bulgaria)	Maria Petrova	9.775
3	(Ukraine)	Ekaterina Serebrianskaya	9.750
4	(Spain)	Carolina Pascual	9.725
4	(Spain)	Carmen Acedo	9.725
6	(Ukraine)	Elena Vitrichenko	9.675
7	(Russia)	Amina Zaripova	9.625
8	(Bulgaria)	Branimira Dimitrova	9.550

== Individual Clubs ==
Place	Nation	Name	Result
1	(Spain)	Carmen Acedo	9.775
2	(Spain)	Carolina Pascual	9.675
3	(Belarus)	Tatiana Ogrizko	9.650
3	(Bulgaria)	Maria Petrova	9.650
3	(Ukraine)	Elena Vitrichenko	9.650
6	(Russia)	Julia Rosliakova	9.600
7	(Russia)	Amina Zaripova	9.525
8	(Bulgaria)	Julia Baicheva	9.500

== Team All-Around ==
Place	Nation	Total
1	Bulgaria	94.750
2	Ukraine	94.400
3	Russia	94.200
4	Spain	93.900
5	Belarus	92.200
6	Germany	89.800
7	North Korea	89.475
8	Japan	89.150
