= Diana Popova =

Bulgarian rhythmic gymnast (born 1976)

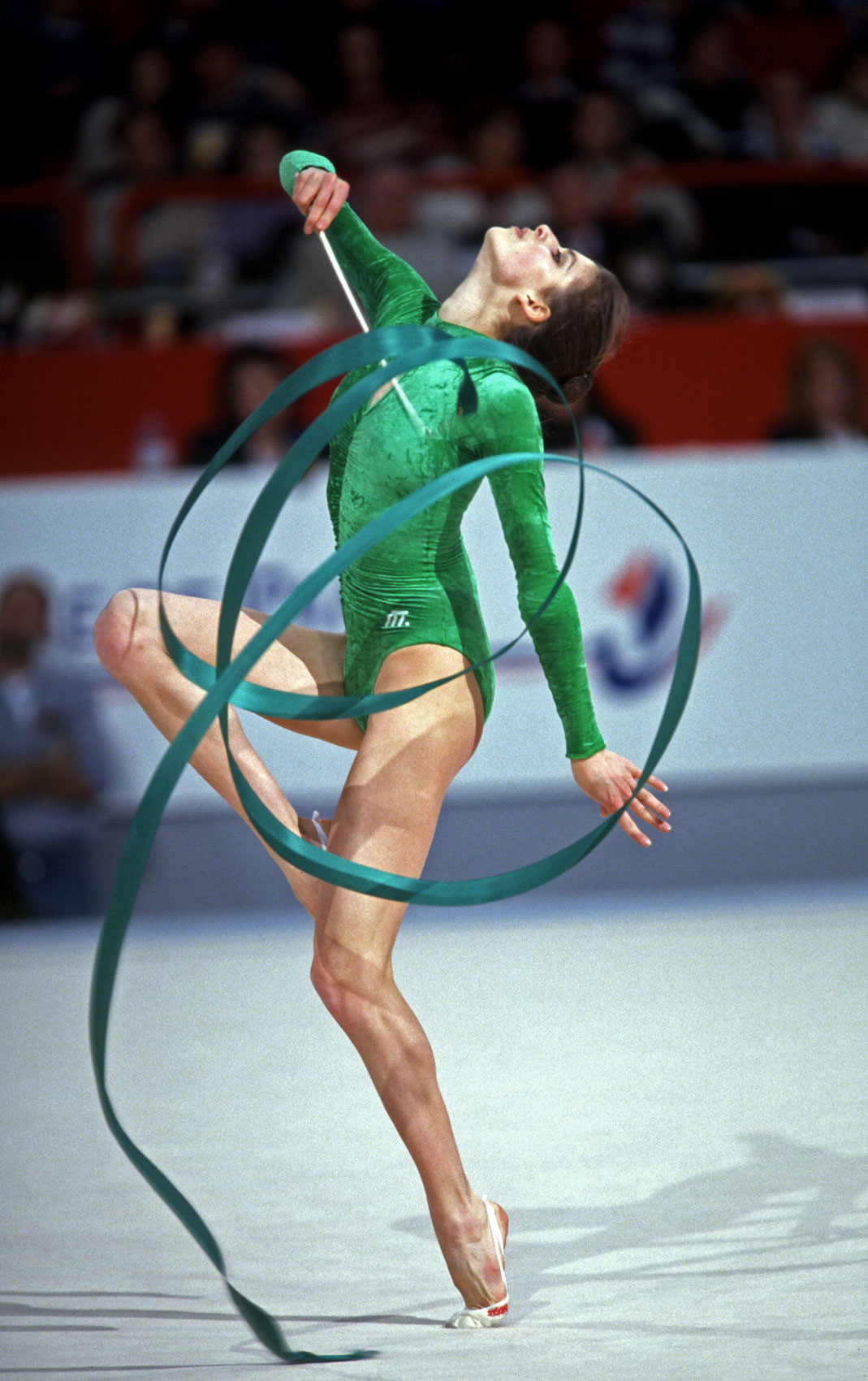

Personal information
- Born: 10 December 1976 (age 49) Plovdiv, Bulgaria

Gymnastics career
- Discipline: Rhythmic gymnastics
- Country represented: Bulgaria
- Head coach: Neshka Robeva
- Assistant coach: Krasimira Filipova
- Retired: 1997
Medal record
Representing Bulgaria
Rhythmic Gymnastics
World Championships
Silver medal – second place	1995 Vienna	Team
Bronze medal – third place	1992 Brussels	Clubs
Bronze medal – third place	1996 Budapest	Rope
European Championships
Gold medal – first place	1992 Stuttgart	Team
Bronze medal – third place	1994 Thessaloniki	Rope
Bronze medal – third place	1994 Thessaloniki	Team
Bronze medal – third place	1996 Asker	Rope
Bronze medal – third place	1996 Asker	Ribbon
Bronze medal – third place	1996 Asker	Team
Summer Universiade
Silver medal – second place	1995 Fukuoka	Rope
Silver medal – second place	1995 Fukuoka	Ball
Silver medal – second place	1995 Fukuoka	Clubs
Silver medal – second place	1995 Fukuoka	Ribbon
Bronze medal – third place	1995 Fukuoka	All-around
Junior European Championships
Gold medal – first place	1991 Lisbon	Hoop
Gold medal – first place	1991 Lisbon	Ribbon
Silver medal – second place	1991 Lisbon	All-around
Silver medal – second place	1991 Lisbon	Team

Diana Antonieva Popova (Bulgarian: Диана Антониева Попова; born 10 December 1976, in Plovdiv, Bulgaria) is a Bulgarian rhythmic gymnastics coach and former rhythmic gymnast who competed at two Olympic Games (1992, 1996) and won several medals at the World and European championships.

== Career ==
Popova began training when she was five years old. During her career, she trained twelve hours a day.

In 1991, Popova competed at the Junior European Championships, where she won two gold and two silver medals. She was the all-around silver medalist and team medalist, and she won gold in the hoop and ribbon finals.

The next year, she competed at the 1992 senior European Championships in June. She won gold in the team competition but did not advance to the all-around final as two of her teammates, Maria Petrova and Dimitrinka Todorova, were ahead of her in the qualification. In August, she competed at the 1992 Summer Olympics, where she was the youngest gymnast competing, and finished 9th in the all-around final. She also competed in the 1992 World Championships in November, where she placed 6th and tied for bronze in the clubs final with Carmen Acedo.

In 1993, Popova suffered a spinal injury. After an MRI scan, she was told that she had a congenital issue with her vertebrae. She was unable to bend at the waist and took six months off from training, and she lost much of her back flexibility.

Popova was able to return to competing; at the 1994 European Championships, she placed 8th in the all-around, and she was again 8th at the 1994 World Championships.

In August 1995, she won five medals at the Summer Universiade - bronze in the all-around, behind Maria Petrova and Inessa Gizikova, and silver in all four apparatus finals behind Petrova. The next month, she participated in the 1995 World Championships and won the team silver with Petrova. Individually, she finished 7th.

At the 1996 European Championships, she finished 8th in the all-around. She also won three bronze medals in team, rope and ribbon. In June, she competed at the 1996 World Championships, which had no all-around competition and only allowed gymnasts to compete in two apparatus finals. She won bronze with the rope and placed 4th with ribbon.

Although her teammate Stella Salapatiyska had placed higher than her (5th) at the European Championships, Popova was selected to compete at her second Olympics in 1996. She competed on painkillers as her spinal pain had returned, though they did not stop the pain entirely. Popova advanced to the semifinal, where she placed 11th and did not continue to the final.

Popova retired after the Olympics. While she had several injuries, including both her spinal problems and a cyst in her knee, she said that she retired because training became overwhelming mentally.

== Personal life ==
Popova relocated to Italy in 1997 to coach and lived there until 2015. She then returned to Bulgaria to coach in her hometown of Plovdiv. However, she has continued to visit Italy for coaching clinics and to choreograph. She has also learned to judge rhythmic gymnastics.

While in Italy, Popova married and gave birth to a daughter, Venere.
