= Evgenia Pavlina =

Belarusian rhythmic gymnast (born 1978)

- Born: 20 July 1978 (age 48) Minsk

Gymnastics career
- Discipline: Rhythmic gymnastics
- Country represented: Belarus
- Head coaches: Galina Krylenko, Natalia Stepanova, Anna Baranova
- Retired: yes
Medal record
Representing Belarus
World Championships
Silver medal – second place	1997 Berlin	Team
Silver medal – second place	1999 Osaka	Team
Bronze medal – third place	1996 Budapest	Ribbon
Bronze medal – third place	1999 Osaka	Hoop
European Championships
Gold medal – first place	1998 Porto	Ribbon
Gold medal – first place	1998 Porto	Team
Silver medal – second place	1998 Porto	All-around
European Team Championships
Gold medal – first place	1997 Paris	Team
Goodwill Games
Silver medal – second place	1998 New York	Ribbon
Silver medal – second place	1998 New York	Hoop
Silver medal – second place	1998 New York	Clubs
Bronze medal – third place	1998 New York	Rope
Bronze medal – third place	1998 New York	All-around

Evgenia Pavlina (born 20 July 1978) is a former Belarusian rhythmic gymnast who competed as an individual. She was born in Minsk, Belarus.

== Career ==
Pavlina started gymnastics at the age of 6 with her first coach Anna Baranova. From age 15 she trained 48 hours per week at club Dynamo Minsk with Belarusian coaches Galina Krylenko and Natalia Stepanova. Pavlina made her senior debut at the 1993 Medico Cup in Austria, where she placed 3rd in the all-around and took two more bronze medals with clubs and ribbon in the final events.

Later that year, her teammate Larissa Lukyanenko broke her ankle in training. At 15 years old, Pavlina was called upon to replace Lukyanenko in the 1993 World Championships. She helped the Belarusian team place 5th in the team event. Pavlina was not chosen for the 1996 Belarusian Olympic Team, but she did compete in most major international events that year.

After the retirement of Lukyanenko, Pavlina emerged as one of the best Belarusian gymnasts. At the 1997 Schmiden International, she won the all-around silver as well as all four apparatus final golds. At the Derjugina Cup, she also earned a pair of bronze medals for the all-around and rope. At the Gymnastics Masters competition in Germany, she won medals in all four apparatus finals: silver with hoop, bronze with ball, and gold with clubs and ribbon. With Tatiana Ogrizko's retirement, she became the top Belarusian gymnast. She won the silver medal at the 1998 European Championships in the all-around, as well as a gold in the ribbon final and the team event. She also finished 3rd in the all-around at the 1998 Goodwill Games.

Although Pavlina continued to compete at major international competitions in 1999, she had begun to be eclipsed by teammate Yulia Raskina. She retired from the sport by that same year.
