= Tatiana Ogrizko =

Belarusian rhythmic gymnast (born 1976)

Tatiana Ogryzko
- Born: 28 May 1976 (age 50) Minsk

Gymnastics career
- Discipline: Rhythmic gymnastics
- Country represented: Belarus
- Head coaches: Galina Krylenko, Irina Leparskaya
- Retired: 1997
Medal record
Representing Belarus
World Championships
Gold medal – first place	1993 Alicante	Ribbon
Silver medal – second place	1997 Berlin	Team
Bronze medal – third place	1993 Alicante	Clubs
European Championships
Silver medal – second place	1992 Stuttgart	Team
Silver medal – second place	1994 Tessaloniki	Team
Silver medal – second place	1996 Asker	Rope
Silver medal – second place	1996 Asker	Team
Silver medal – second place	1997 Patras	All-around
Silver medal – second place	1997 Patras	Rope
Silver medal – second place	1997 Patras	Clubs
Bronze medal – third place	1996 Asker	Ribbon
European Team Championships
Gold medal – first place	1997 Paris	Team
European Cup Final
Bronze medal – third place	1993 Málaga	Ball
Grand Prix Final
Bronze medal – third place	1996 Vienna	All-around
Bronze medal – third place	1997 Deventer	Rope
Bronze medal – third place	1997 Deventer	Hoop
Summer Universiade
Gold medal – first place	1997 Sicily	Clubs
Silver medal – second place	1997 Sicily	All-around
Silver medal – second place	1997 Sicily	Ribbon
Bronze medal – third place	1997 Sicily	Hoop

Tatiana Ogryzko (born 28 May 1976 in Minsk, Belarus) is a Belarusian former individual rhythmic gymnast.

== Biography ==
In 1992, Ogrizko was involved in a car accident which left her in a coma for six months. She had to learn to walk again. One year later, she participated at the World Championships in Alicante in 1993, sharing the gold medal in the ribbon competition with Maria Petrova of Bulgaria.

She participated at the 1996 Olympic Games, and ranked 6th in the AA semi-finals and 8th in the AA finals.

She retired at age 21 in 1997.

Ogrizko is currently a coach and judge for the Belarusian Gymnastics Federation. She and her former teammate, Larissa Loukianenko, are currently coaching Melitina Staniouta.
