= Gymnastics at the 1997 Summer Universiade =

Gymnastics competition

Gymnastics at the XIX Summer Universiade
- Venue: Catania

== Combined medal table ==
Rank	Nation	Gold	Silver	Bronze	Total
1	China (CHN)	5	2	1	8
2	Japan (JPN)	4	4	3	11
3	Ukraine (UKR)	4	0	1	5
4	Russia (RUS)	2	4	2	8
5	United States (USA)	1	2	2	5
6	Belarus (BLR)	1	2	1	4
7	Romania (ROU)	1	1	2	4
8	Italy (ITA)	1	1	1	3
9	France (FRA)	1	0	1	2
10	Mexico (MEX)	1	0	0	1
11	Cuba (CUB)	0	1	1	2
11	South Korea (KOR)	0	1	1	2
13	Croatia (CRO)	0	0	1	1
13	Slovenia (SLO)	0	0	1	1
Totals (14 entries)		21	18	18	57

== Men's events ==
Event	Gold	Silver	Bronze
All-around	Zheng Lihui (CHN)	Zhao Shen (CHN)	Wang Dong (CHN)
Floor	Zhao Shen (CHN)	Cho Seong Min (KOR)	Ioan Silviu Suciu (ROM)
Horizontal Bar	Yoshihiro Saito (JPN)	Zheng Lihui (CHN)	Yoshiaki Hatakeda (JPN)
Parallel Bars	Zhao Shen (CHN)	Naoya Tsukahara (JPN)	Mitja Petkovšek (SLO)
Vault	Naoya Tsukahara (JPN)	Ioan Silviu Suciu (ROM)	Cho Seong-Min (KOR)
Pommel Horse	Ioan Silviu Suciu (ROM)	Kenichi Fujita (JPN)	Alberto Busnari (ITA)
Rings	Juri Chechi (ITA)	Roberto Galli (ITA)	Aleksej Demjanov (CRO)
Team	China (CHN)	Japan (JPN)	Romania (ROM)

== Women's Event ==
Event	Gold	Silver	Bronze
All-around	Shannon Miller (USA)	Kathleen Shrieves (USA)	Risa Sugawara (JPN)
Uneven Bars	Zheng Zhi (CHN)	Risa Sugawara (JPN)	Kathleen Shrieves (USA)
Balance Beam	Risa Sugawara (JPN)	Leyanet González (CUB)	Rozalia Galiyeva (RUS)
Vault	Denisse López (MEX)	Alla Pelchkova (RUS)	Leah Brown (USA)
Floor Exercise	Risa Sugawara (JPN)	Oksana Postavets (RUS)	Leyanet González (CUB)
Team	Russia (RUS)	United States (USA)	Japan (JPN)

=== Medal table ===
Rank	Nation	Gold	Silver	Bronze	Total
1	China (CHN)	5	2	1	8
2	Japan (JPN)	4	4	3	11
3	United States (USA)	1	2	2	5
4	Russia (RUS)	1	2	1	4
5	Romania (ROU)	1	1	2	4
6	Italy (ITA)	1	1	1	3
7	Mexico (MEX)	1	0	0	1
8	Cuba (CUB)	0	1	1	2
8	South Korea (KOR)	0	1	1	2
10	Croatia (CRO)	0	0	1	1
10	Slovenia (SLO)	0	0	1	1
Totals (11 entries)		14	14	14	42

== Rhythmic Gymnastics ==
Event	Gold	Silver	Bronze
All-around	Olena Vitrychenko (UKR)	Tatiana Ogrizko (BLR)	Amina Zaripova (RUS)
Rope	Olena Vitrychenko (UKR)	Amina Zaripova (RUS)	Eva Serrano (FRA)
Hoop	Eva Serrano (FRA) Olena Vitrychenko (UKR)	None awarded	Tatiana Ogrizko (BLR)
Clubs	Tatiana Ogrizko (BLR) Amina Zaripova (RUS)	None awarded	Olena Vitrychenko (UKR)
Ribbon	Olena Vitrychenko (UKR)	Tatiana Ogrizko (BLR) Amina Zaripova (RUS)	None awarded

=== Medal table ===
Rank	Nation	Gold	Silver	Bronze	Total
1	Ukraine (UKR)	4	0	1	5
2	Belarus (BLR)	1	2	1	4
2	Russia (RUS)	1	2	1	4
4	France (FRA)	1	0	1	2
Totals (4 entries)		7	4	4	15
