= 1996 Rhythmic Gymnastics European Championships =

- Location: Asker, Norway
- Start date: 29 May 1996
- End date: 2 June 1996

The 1996 Rhythmic Gymnastics European Championships is the 12th edition of the Rhythmic Gymnastics European Championships, which took place from 29 May to 2 June in Asker, Norway.

== Medal winners ==
Event	Gold	Silver	Bronze
Team Competition
Team	Ukraine; Ekaterina Serebrianskaya; Elena Vitrychenko	Belarus; Tatiana Ogrizko; Larissa Lukyanenko	Bulgaria; Diana Popova; Stella Salapatiyska
Senior Individual
All-Around	Ekaterina Serebrianskaya; Ukraine	Yanina Batyrchina; Russia	Amina Zaripova; Russia
Rope	Ekaterina Serebrianskaya; Ukraine	Tatiana Ogrizko; Belarus	Diana Popova; Bulgaria; Elena Vitrychenko; Ukraine
Ball	Ekaterina Serebrianskaya; Ukraine	Yanina Batyrchina; Russia; Elena Vitrychenko; Ukraine	None Awarded
Clubs	Amina Zaripova; Russia	Ekaterina Serebrianskaya; Ukraine	Natalia Lipkovskaya; Russia; Elena Vitrychenko; Ukraine
Ribbon	Ekaterina Serebrianskaya; Ukraine	Larissa Lukyanenko; Belarus	Tatiana Ogrizko; Belarus; Diana Popova; Bulgaria
Junior Groups
6 Balls	Russia; Anna Popova	Belarus	Italy

== Medal table ==
Rank	Nation	Gold	Silver	Bronze	Total
1	Ukraine (UKR)	5	2	2	9
2	Russia (RUS)	2	2	2	6
3	Belarus (BLR)	0	4	1	5
4	Bulgaria (BUL)	0	0	3	3
5	Italy (ITA)	0	0	1	1
Totals (5 entries)		7	8	9	24
