= 1994 Rhythmic Gymnastics European Championships =

- Location: Thessaloniki, Greece
- Start date: 26 May 1994
- End date: 29 May 1994

The 1994 Rhythmic Gymnastics European Championships is the 10th edition of the Rhythmic Gymnastics European Championships, which took place from 26 May to 29 May in Thessaloniki, Greece.

== Medal winners ==
Event	Gold	Silver	Bronze
Team Competition
Team	Ukraine; Elena Vitrichenko; Ekaterina Serebrianskaya; Elena Shumskaya	Belarus; Larissa Lukyanenko; Olga Gontar; Tatiana Ogrizko	Bulgaria; Maria Petrova; Diana Popova; Maria Gateva; Albena Angova
Senior Individual
All-Around	Maria Petrova; Bulgaria	Elena Vitrichenko; Ukraine	Amina Zaripova; Russia
Rope	Elena Vitrichenko; Ukraine	Julia Rosliakova; Russia	Diana Popova; Bulgaria
Hoop	Elena Vitrichenko; Ukraine	Maria Petrova; Bulgaria	Amina Zaripova; Russia
Ball	Ekaterina Serebrianskaya; Ukraine; Amina Zaripova; Russia	None awarded	Larissa Lukyanenko; Belarus; Maria Petrova; Bulgaria
Clubs	Larissa Lukyanenko; Belarus; Amina Zaripova; Russia	None awarded	Ekaterina Serebrianskaya; Ukraine
Ribbon	Ekaterina Serebrianskaya; Ukraine; Elena Vitrichenko; Ukraine	None awarded	Amina Zaripova; Russia
Junior Groups
6 Hoops	Greece	Bulgaria	Russia

== Medal table ==
Rank	Nation	Gold	Silver	Bronze	Total
1	Ukraine (UKR)	6	1	1	8
2	Russia (RUS)	2	1	4	7
3	Bulgaria (BUL)	1	2	3	6
4	Belarus (BLR)	1	1	1	3
5	Greece (GRE)	1	0	0	1
Totals (5 entries)		11	5	9	25
