= 1997 Rhythmic Gymnastics European Championships =

- Location: Patras, Greece
- Start date: 23 May 1997
- End date: 25 May 1997

The 13th Rhythmic Gymnastics European Championships were held in Patras, Greece from 23 May to 25 May.

== Medal winners ==
| Event | Gold | Silver | Bronze |
|---|---|---|---|
Senior Individual
| All-Around | Elena Vitrychenko; Ukraine | Tatiana Ogrizko; Belarus | Ekaterina Serebrianskaya; Ukraine |
| Rope | Ekaterina Serebrianskaya; Ukraine | Eva Serrano; France | Yanina Batyrchina; Russia |
| Hoop | Elena Vitrychenko; Ukraine | Tatiana Ogrizko; Belarus; Maria Pagalou; Greece | None Awarded |
| Clubs | Natalia Lipkovskaya; Russia | Tatiana Ogrizko; Belarus; Yanina Batyrchina; Russia; Ekaterina Serebrianskaya; Ukraine | None Awarded |
| Ribbon | Yanina Batyrchina; Russia | Maria Pagalou; Greece; Eva Serrano; France; Elena Vitrychenko; Ukraine; Ekaterina Serebrianskaya; Ukraine | None Awarded |
Senior Groups
| All-Around | Russia | Greece; Irene Mandraveli | Ukraine |
| 5 Balls | Russia | Spain; Ukraine | None Awarded |
| 3 Balls + 2 Ribbons | Belarus; Natalia Boudilo | Bulgaria | Spain |
Junior Groups
| 12 Clubs | Greece | Belarus | Russia |

== Medal table ==
| Rank | Nation | Gold | Silver | Bronze | Total |
|---|---|---|---|---|---|
| 1 | Russia (RUS) | 4 | 1 | 1 | 6 |
| 2 | Ukraine (UKR) | 3 | 4 | 2 | 9 |
| 3 | Belarus (BLR) | 1 | 3 | 0 | 4 |
| 4 | Greece (GRE) | 0 | 3 | 0 | 3 |
| 5 | France (FRA) | 0 | 2 | 0 | 2 |
| 6 | Spain (ESP) | 0 | 1 | 1 | 2 |
| 7 | Bulgaria (BUL) | 0 | 1 | 0 | 1 |
| Totals (7 entries) | | 8 | 15 | 4 | 27 |
