= Elena Vitrichenko =

Ukrainian rhythmic gymnast (born 1976)

Elena Vitrichenko Олена Вітриченко
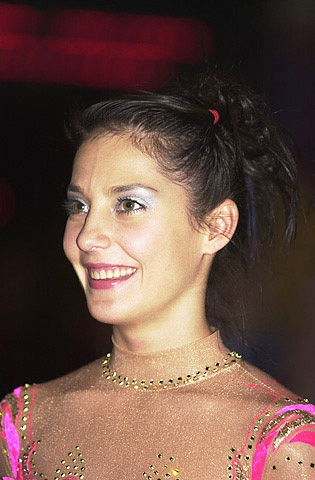
- Elena Vitrichenko smiles during her farewell celebration at 2000 Deventer Grand Prix

Personal information
- Full name: Olena Ihorivna Vitrychenko
- Alternative names: Elena Igorevna Vitrichenko; Yelena Igorevna Vitrichenko
- Born: November 25, 1976 (age 49) Odesa, Ukrainian SSR, USSR

Gymnastics career
- Discipline: Rhythmic gymnastics
- Country represented: Ukraine
- Retired: 2000
Medal record
Rhythmic Gymnastics
Representing Ukraine
Event	1st	2nd	3rd
Olympic Games	0	0	1
World Championships	9	7	7
European Championships	10	5	4
European Team Championships	0	0	1
European Cup Final	0	2	1
Grand Prix Final	5	4	2
Summer Universiade	4	0	1
Goodwill Games	1	1	1
Junior European Championships	2	1	0
Total	31	20	18
Olympic Games
Bronze medal – third place	1996 Atlanta	All-around
World Championships
Gold medal – first place	1994 Paris	Ball
Gold medal – first place	1995 Vienna	Ribbon
Gold medal – first place	1996 Budapest	Ribbon
Gold medal – first place	1997 Berlin	All-around
Gold medal – first place	1997 Berlin	Rope
Gold medal – first place	1997 Berlin	Clubs
Gold medal – first place	1997 Berlin	Ribbon
Gold medal – first place	1999 Osaka	Rope
Gold medal – first place	1999 Osaka	Hoop
Silver medal – second place	1992 Brussels	3 ropes/3 balls
Silver medal – second place	1993 Alicante	Ball
Silver medal – second place	1993 Alicante	Team
Silver medal – second place	1994 Paris	Ribbon
Silver medal – second place	1995 Vienna	Rope
Silver medal – second place	1996 Budapest	Clubs
Silver medal – second place	1997 Berlin	Hoop
Bronze medal – third place	1993 Alicante	Hoop
Bronze medal – third place	1993 Alicante	Clubs
Bronze medal – third place	1995 Vienna	Clubs
Bronze medal – third place	1995 Vienna	Team
Bronze medal – third place	1997 Berlin	Team
Bronze medal – third place	1999 Osaka	Ribbon
Bronze medal – third place	1999 Osaka	Team
European Championships
Gold medal – first place	1994 Thessaloniki	Rope
Gold medal – first place	1994 Thessaloniki	Hoop
Gold medal – first place	1994 Thessaloniki	Ribbon
Gold medal – first place	1994 Thessaloniki	Team
Gold medal – first place	1996 Asker	Team
Gold medal – first place	1997 Patras	All-around
Gold medal – first place	1997 Patras	Hoop
Gold medal – first place	1998 Porto	Clubs
Gold medal – first place	1999 Budapest	Ball
Gold medal – first place	1999 Budapest	Ribbon
Silver medal – second place	1994 Thessaloniki	All-around
Silver medal – second place	1996 Asker	Ball
Silver medal – second place	1997 Patras	Ribbon
Silver medal – second place	1998 Porto	Team
Silver medal – second place	1999 Budapest	Rope
Bronze medal – third place	1992 Stuttgart	3 Ropes + 3 Balls
Bronze medal – third place	1996 Asker	Rope
Bronze medal – third place	1996 Asker	Clubs
Bronze medal – third place	1998 Porto	Rope
European Team Championships
Bronze medal – third place	1997 Paris	Team
European Cup Final
Silver medal – second place	1995 Telford	All-around
Silver medal – second place	1995 Telford	Clubs
Bronze medal – third place	1995 Telford	Ribbon
Grand Prix Final
Gold medal – first place	1995 Deventer	Rope
Gold medal – first place	1995 Deventer	Clubs
Gold medal – first place	1995 Deventer	Ribbon
Gold medal – first place	1997 Deventer	Clubs
Gold medal – first place	1999 Korneuburg	Rope
Silver medal – second place	1994 Vienna	All-around
Silver medal – second place	1995 Deventer	All-around
Silver medal – second place	1997 Deventer	Rope
Silver medal – second place	1998 Linz	All-around
Bronze medal – third place	1997 Deventer	Ribbon
Bronze medal – third place	1999 Korneuburg	Hoop
Summer Universiade
Gold medal – first place	1997 Sicily	All-around
Gold medal – first place	1997 Sicily	Ribbon
Gold medal – first place	1997 Sicily	Hoop
Gold medal – first place	1997 Sicily	Rope
Bronze medal – third place	1997 Sicily	Clubs
Goodwill Games
Gold medal – first place	1998 New York	Rope
Silver medal – second place	1998 New York	All-around
Bronze medal – third place	1998 New York	Hoop
Representing Soviet Union
Junior European Championships
Gold medal – first place	1991 Lisbon	Team
Gold medal – first place	1991 Lisbon	Clubs
Silver medal – second place	1991 Lisbon	Ball
Event	1st	2nd	3rd
Grand Prix	40	28	25
World Cup Series	2	0	1
Total	42	28	26
- Awards: Longines Prize for Elegance (1999)

Elena Vitrichenko (or Olena Vitrychenko, Ukrainian: Олена Ігорівна Вітриченко; Russian: Елена Игоревна Витриченко; born 25 November 1976) is a Ukrainian former rhythmic gymnast who primarily competed as an individual. She is the 1996 Olympics bronze medalist, the 1997 World all-around champion, and the 1997 European all-around champion. She now coaches in the United States.

== Career ==
Elena Vitrichenko was introduced to the sport in 1980 when she was four years old by her mother, Nina, herself a former rhythmic gymnast. Her mother coached her at the Deriugins School in Kyiv, and beginning in 1997, she trained in the Boris Savlokhov club. Her mother alleged that they were essentially kicked out of the Deriugins school by not being allowed full training time and rarely being allowed to practice routines with music.

Vitrichenko made her international debut in 1986. At the 1992 European Championships in Stuttgart, Germany, she won a bronze medal as a member of the Ukrainian group. At the 1994 World Championships in Paris, she placed 6th in the all-around.

At the 1996 Atlanta Olympics, Vitrichenko seemed to be a contender for the gold medal, having placed first after preliminaries and second after the semi-finals. She was the only gymnast to perform clean routines on all days of the competition, including during the final; she finished with a good ribbon routine after Kateryna Serebrianska and Yana Batyrshina both dropped their ribbons during the last round of the competition finals. However, she placed third, a result that was controversial. Vitrichenko said in a 1998 interview that she felt "there was a little bit of unfair judging" at the event, though she defended having her own mother judge her at other events, pointing to the hoop final at the 1997 World Championships, where her mother scored her under Natalia Lipkovskaya, who won the final.

Vitrichenko won the all-around at the 1997 European Championships, where she also won gold in the hoop final, the 1997 Summer Universiade, and the 1997 World Championships, where she additionally won three of the event finals. The next year, she lost both the 1998 European Championships and the 1998 Goodwill Games titles to Alina Kabaeva. At the 1999 World Championships, she was fifth in the all-around but won the hoop and rope titles with perfect 10 scores.

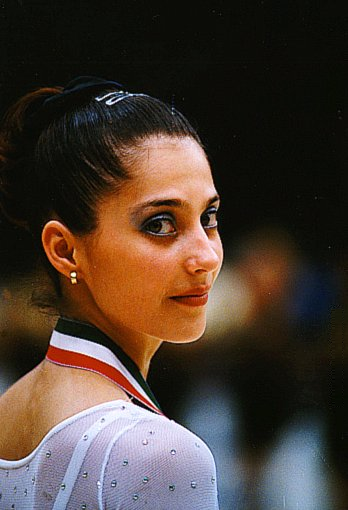
Vitrichenko at the 1999 European Championships

At the peak of a long and well-publicized feud with the head of the Ukrainian Rhythmic Gymnastics Federation, Irina Deriugina, Vitrichenko was placed 19th in the qualification round at the 2000 European Championships in Zaragoza, Spain, and she withdrew in protest. After an official review determined that certain judges had clearly discriminated against Vitrichenko, Deriugina and five other judges were banned for one year. The other 26 judges at the event were not allowed to judge the Olympics.

Afterward, the International Olympic Committee awarded her a spot on the Ukrainian Olympic team. She performed well at the Olympics, finishing in fourth place behind Alina Kabaeva. She retired in 2000.

== Coaching career ==
Vitrichenko coached rhythmic gymnastics in Spain for ten years. In March 2013, she began coaching at the Illinois Rhythmic Gymnastic Center. In 2014, she opened her own gym, which moved to Libertyville, Illinois in 2024.

== Personal life ==
Vitrichenko has three children.

== Routine music information ==
Year	Apparatus	Music title
2000	Hoop	Toccata and Fugue in D Minor by Vanessa Mae
2000	Rope (second)	Bumble Bee Boogie by Robert Wells
2000	Rope (first)	Ty zh mene pidmanula by Vladimir Bustriakov (Ukrainian traditional)
2000	Ball	Apassionata by Secret Garden
2000	Ribbon	Plaza of Execution / Stealing the Map music from The Mask of Zorro by James Horner
1999	Hoop	Steppe by Rene Aubry
1999	Rope (second)	Ty zh mene pidmanula by Vladimir Bustriakov (Ukrainian traditional)
1999	Rope (first)	Plaza of Execution / Stealing the Map music from The Mask of Zorro by James Horner
1999	Ball	Apassionata by Secret Garden
1999	Ribbon (second)	Harlem Nocturne by Sam Taylor
1999	Ribbon (first)	Theme from Rainman by Hans Zimmer
1998	Hoop	Saltimbanco music from Cirque du Soleil: Saltimbanco by Rene Dupere
1998	Clubs	Birimbau (from Mystère, Cirque du Soleil) by Rene Dupere
1998	Rope	Seisouso music from Quidam by Benoît Jutras
1998	Ribbon	One Man's Dream by Yanni
1997	Hoop	Saltimbanco music from Cirque du Soleil: Saltimbanco by Rene Dupere
1997	Clubs (second)	Birimbau (from Mystère, Cirque du Soleil) by Rene Dupere
1997	Clubs (first)	Latino by Anatoly Vekshin
1997	Rope	The Heat (from Birdy) by Peter Gabriel
1997	Ribbon	One Man's Dream by Yanni
1996	Ball	?
1996	Rope	Sing, Sing, Sing by Benjamin Goodman
1996	Clubs	?
1996	Ribbon	Pink Panther, by Henry Mancini
1995	Ball	Echano by Chuck Mangione
1995	Rope (second)	Sing, Sing, Sing by Benjamin Goodman
1995	Rope (first)	Toccata & Fugue in D minor by Johann Sebastian Bach
1995	Clubs	?
1995	Ribbon (second)	Carmen Suite by Rodion Shchedrin/ Bizet
1995	Ribbon (first)	Boléro by Maurice Ravel
1994	Ball	Toccata and Fugue in D Minor by Johann Sebastian Bach
1994	Rope	Marche en la by Ennio Morricone
1994	Clubs	Eclipse (from Nouvelle Experience, Cirque du Soleil) by Rene Dupere
1994	Ribbon	Peer Gynt Suite No.1: In The Hall Of The Mountain King music from Peer Gynt by Edvard Grieg
1993	Ball (second)	Marche en la by Ennio Morricone
1993	Ball (first)	Peer Gynt Suite No.1: In The Hall Of The Mountain King music from Peer Gynt by Edvard Grieg
1993	Hoop	?
1993	Clubs	Rhapsody in Blue / Fascinating Rhythm by George Gershwin
1993	Ribbon	?

== Detailed Olympic results ==
Year	Competition description	Location	Music	Apparatus	Score-Final	Score-Qualifying
2000	Olympics	Sydney		All-around	39.408	39.399
2000	Olympics	Sydney	Plaza of Execution / Stealing the Map music from The Mask of Zorro by James Horner	Ribbon	9.875	9.883
2000	Olympics	Sydney	Sing, Sing, Sing by Benjamin Goodman	Rope	9.825	9.850
2000	Olympics	Sydney	Pink Dream by Anatoly Vekshin	Ball	9.875	9.866
2000	Olympics	Sydney	Toccata and Fugue in D Minor by Vanessa Mae	Hoop	9.883	9.800

Year	Competition description	Location	Music	Apparatus	Score-Final	Score-Qualifying
1996	Olympics	Atlanta		All-around	39.331	39.266
1996	Olympics	Atlanta	unknown music	Ribbon	9.816	9.866
1996	Olympics	Atlanta	Sing, Sing, Sing by Benjamin Goodman	Rope	9.866	9.750
1996	Olympics	Atlanta	Pink Dream by Anatoly Vekshin	Ball	9.800	9.900
1996	Olympics	Atlanta	unknown music	Clubs	9.849	9.750

== Honours ==
- Longines Prize for Elegance: 1999

=== Orders ===
- Honorary Award of the President of Ukraine: 1996
- Order of Merit 2nd Class: 1997
