= Maria Petrova (rhythmic gymnast) =

Bulgarian rhythmic gymnast (born 1975)

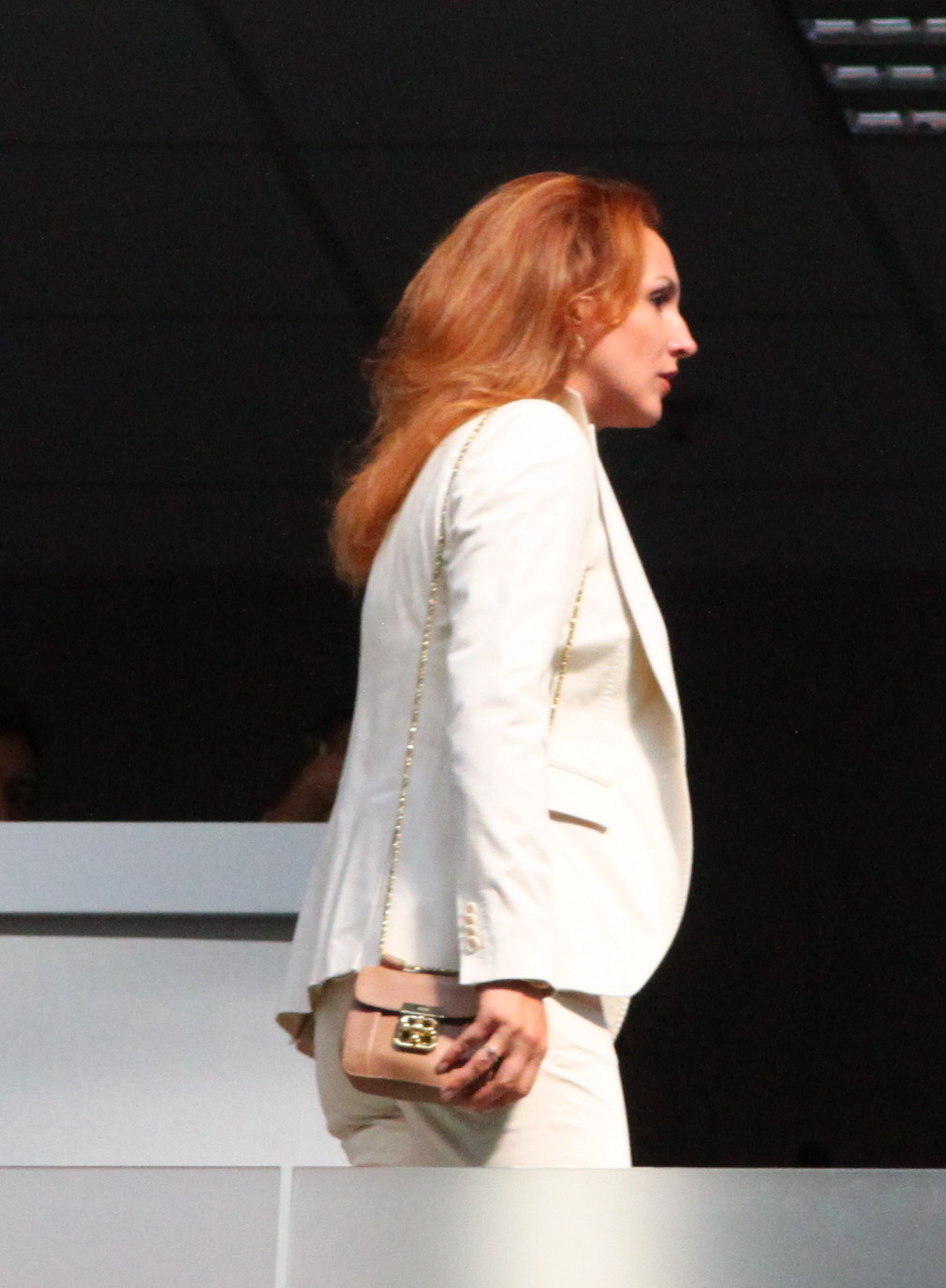
- Petrova in 2011

Personal information
- Full name: Maria Dimitrova Petrova
- Born: 13 November 1975 (age 50) Plovdiv, Bulgaria

Gymnastics career
- Discipline: Rhythmic gymnastics
- Country represented: Bulgaria
- Club: Levski
- Head coaches: Neshka Robeva, Natalia Muravenova
Medal record
Representing Bulgaria
World Championships
Gold medal – first place	1993 Alicante	All-around
Gold medal – first place	1993 Alicante	Hoop
Gold medal – first place	1993 Alicante	Ball
Gold medal – first place	1993 Alicante	Ribbon
Gold medal – first place	1993 Alicante	Team
Gold medal – first place	1994 Paris	All-around
Gold medal – first place	1994 Paris	Hoop
Gold medal – first place	1995 Vienna	All-Around
Gold medal – first place	1995 Vienna	Clubs
Silver medal – second place	1991 Athens	Team
Silver medal – second place	1992 Brussels	All-around
Silver medal – second place	1992 Brussels	Ball
Silver medal – second place	1992 Brussels	Clubs
Silver medal – second place	1994 Paris	Clubs
Silver medal – second place	1994 Paris	Ribbon
Silver medal – second place	1995 Vienna	Rope
Silver medal – second place	1995 Vienna	Team
Silver medal – second place	1996 Budapest	Ball
Bronze medal – third place	1992 Brussels	Hoop
Bronze medal – third place	1993 Alicante	Clubs
Bronze medal – third place	1994 Paris	Ball
Bronze medal – third place	1996 Budapest	Clubs
European Championships
Gold medal – first place	1992 Stuttgart	All-around
Gold medal – first place	1992 Stuttgart	Team
Gold medal – first place	1994 Thessaloniki	All-around
Silver medal – second place	1994 Thessaloniki	Hoop
Bronze medal – third place	1992 Stuttgart	Rope
Bronze medal – third place	1994 Thessaloniki	Ball
Bronze medal – third place	1994 Thessaloniki	Team
European Cup Final
Gold medal – first place	1993 Málaga	All-around
Gold medal – first place	1993 Málaga	Hoop
Gold medal – first place	1993 Málaga	Ribbon
Silver medal – second place	1993 Málaga	Ball
Summer Universiade
Gold medal – first place	1995 Fukuoka	All-around
Gold medal – first place	1995 Fukuoka	Rope
Gold medal – first place	1995 Fukuoka	Ball
Gold medal – first place	1995 Fukuoka	Clubs
Gold medal – first place	1995 Fukuoka	Ribbon

Maria Dimitrova Petrova (Bulgarian: Мария Димитрова Петрова; born 13 November 1975) is a Bulgarian former rhythmic gymnast who is now a rhythmic gymnastics judge and official. She is a triple World all-around champion (1993, 1994, 1995) and a triple European all-around champion (1992, 1993, 1994).

== Career ==
Born in Plovdiv, Bulgaria, Petrova began her training at the age of five at local club Trakia Plovdiv Club, coached by Natalia Moravenova. By 1991, she was coached by Neshka Robeva at the Levski Sofia Club. In her first World Championship appearance, Petrova placed second in the team competition after a hoop drop.

Petrova was one of the favorites to win gold but found herself finishing in fifth in the all-around finals at the Barcelona Olympics after a penalty of .20 was imposed due to the zipper on the back of her leotard that had broken during her hoop exercise. A few months later, at the World Championships, Petrova took second place behind Russia's Oxana Kostina and ahead of Belarusian Larissa Lukyanenko.

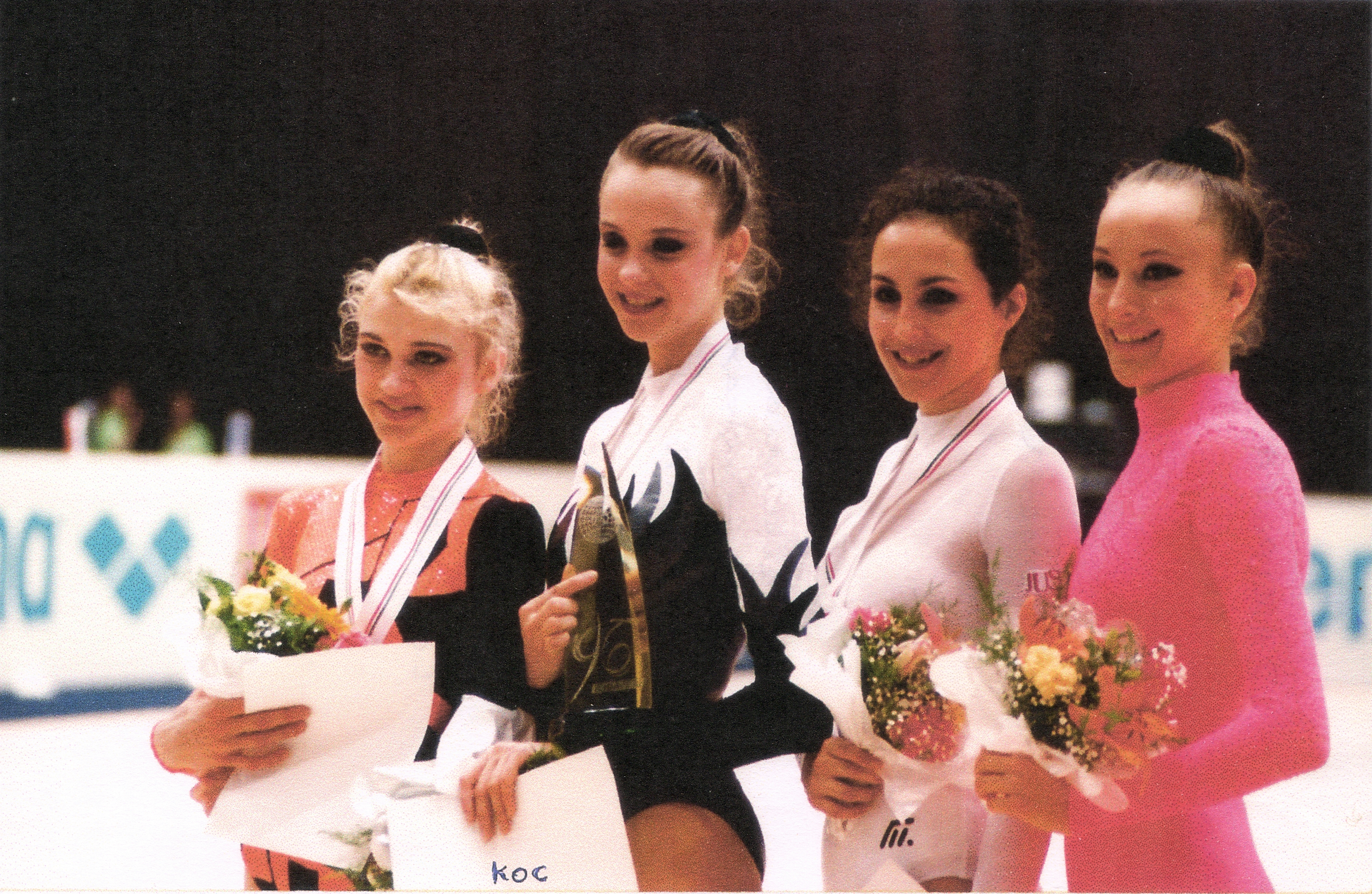
Petrova (third from left) at the 1996 World Championships

In 1993, Petrova performed with her Panovaesque ball to an Indian melody. She also competed in a ribbon exercise, and a small-toss filled clubs routine to Suzanne Vega's "Tom's Diner". Her final performance to Carmina Burana caused a great crowd ovation. She went on to win the all-around World title, as well as three more gold medals (ball, hoop, ribbon) and a bronze medal (clubs).

She went on to win one more European title and two more world titles (shared in 1995 with Yekaterina Serebrianskaya), tying her with countrywoman Maria Gigova for the most wins in the latter category.

Competing in her second Olympics, Petrova was one of the front runner to win the gold at the 1996 Summer Olympics in Atlanta, however a series of mistakes left her finishing in 5th place in the All-around Finals behind Russia's Amina Zaripova.

Although she had tried to retire several times after her first World title, Petrova continued competing as a favor to the Bulgarian national team, which was in a rebuilding phase after the Eastern European Communist collapse.

Petrova previously shared the world record for most individual world all-around rhythmic gymnastics titles with Maria Gigova, Evgenia Kanaeva and Yana Kudryavtseva, until that record was broken by Dina Averina in 2021. Petrova's three titles were earned in 1993, 1994, and 1995 (shared).

She is currently a judge in rhythmic gymnastics and served as the Execution Supervisor at the 2024 Paris Olympics. In 2021, she was elected second vice president of the International Gymnastics Federation technical committee for rhythmic gymnastics, and she was re-elected in 2024.

== Personal life ==
In 1998, Petrova married Bulgarian footballer Borislav Mihaylov.

== Achievements ==
- Petrova won 3 world titles in three consecutive years (1993, 1994, 1995 tied with Ekaterina Serebrianskaya) equaled only by fellow countrywoman Maria Gigova (1969, 1971 tied with Galima Shugurova, 1973) and Russian gymnasts Evgenia Kanaeva (2009, 2010, 2011) and Yana Kudryavtseva (2013, 2014, 2015).

== Routine music information ==
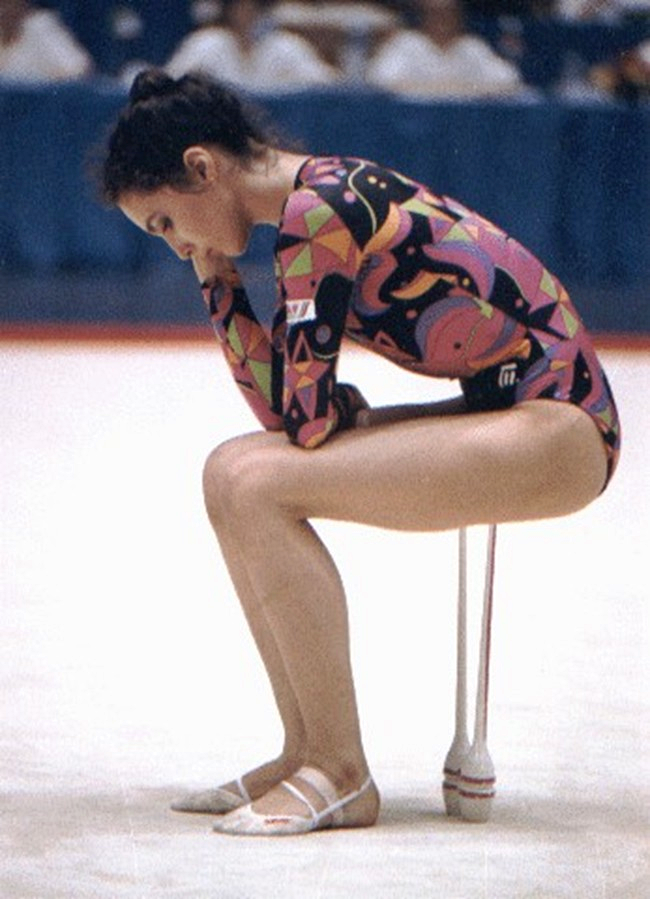
Petrova at the European Cup in 1993

Year	Apparatus	Music title
1996	Ball	She is Dead music from Leon (The Professional) by Eric Serra
1996	Rope	?
1996	Clubs	Habanera, Scene music from Carmen Suite by Rodion Shchedrin / Bizet
1996	Ribbon	La Zarzamora by Paco de Lucia
1995	Ball	Dreaming Strings by Gheorge Zamfir
1995	Rope	?
1995	Clubs	Wedding Celebration / The Bottle Dance music from Fiddler on the Roof by Jerry Bock
1995	Ribbon	La Zarzamora by Paco de Lucia
1994	Ball	Dreaming Strings by Gheorge Zamfir
1994	Hoop	Carmina Burana music from Synthétiseur 6 by Synthesizer
1994	Clubs	Wedding Celebration / The Bottle Dance music from Fiddler on the Roof by Jerry Bock
1994	Ribbon	The Lark by Balogh Kalman
1993	Ball	Toni / Making Music by Zakir Hussain
1993	Hoop	Carmina Burana music from Synthétiseur 6 by Synthesizer
1993	Clubs	Tom's Diner by Suzanne Vega/DNA
1993	Ribbon	The Lark by Balogh Kalman
1992	Ball	Toni / Making Music by Zakir Hussain
1992	Hoop	Duet Improvisation (Part 1) and Duet Improvisation (Part 2) by Chick Corea Trio Music
1992	Clubs	Tom's Diner by Suzanne Vega/DNA
1992	Rope	Amazonas by Strunz & Farah
1991	Ball	The First Garden from The Secret Life of Plants by Stevie Wonder
1991	Hoop	he Feeling Begins music from The Last Temptation of Christ by Peter Gabriel
1991	Clubs	Camptown Races
1991	Rope	?
