= 1998 Rhythmic Gymnastics European Championships =

- Location: Porto, Portugal
- Start date: 28 May 1998
- End date: 31 May 1998

The 14th Rhythmic Gymnastics European Championships were held in Porto, Portugal from 28 May to 31 May 1998.

== Medal winners ==
Event	Gold	Silver	Bronze
Team Competition
Team	Belarus; Evgenia Pavlina; Yulia Raskina	Ukraine; Ekaterina Serebrianskaya; Elena Vitrichenko	Russia; Alina Kabaeva; Yanina Batyrchina
Senior Individual
All-Around	Alina Kabaeva; Russia	Evgenia Pavlina; Belarus	Yanina Batyrchina; Russia
Rope	Yanina Batyrchina; Russia	Ekaterina Serebrianskaya; Ukraine	Elena Vitrichenko; Ukraine
Hoop	Ekaterina Serebrianskaya; Ukraine	Yanina Batyrchina; Russia	Eva Serrano; France
Clubs	Elena Vitrichenko; Ukraine	Eva Serrano; France	Yulia Raskina; Belarus
Ribbon	Evgenia Pavlina; Belarus	Yanina Batyrchina; Russia	Ekaterina Serebrianskaya; Ukraine

== Medal table ==
Rank	Nation	Gold	Silver	Bronze	Total
1	Russia (RUS)	2	2	2	6
1	Ukraine (UKR)	2	2	2	6
3	Belarus (BLR)	2	1	1	4
4	France (FRA)	0	1	1	2
Totals (4 entries)		6	6	6	18
