= Ty zh mene pidmanula =

Ukrainian traditional song

Song
- Released: 1897
- Genre: Ukrainian folk

Audio sample
- Instrumental melody of the song: file; help

"Ty Zh Mene Pidmanula" (Ukrainian: «Ти ж мене підманула», lit. 'You've deceived me'), or "Pidmanula, Pidvela" (Підманула, підвела, '[You] Have deceived, let down') is a popular humorous Ukrainian folk song, first mentioned in 1897. The name literally translates as "you tricked me and let me down".

There are many different variations of the song, but all have the same general format. Traditionally, it is about a man complaining to his girlfriend that he feels tricked because she tells him she will meet him somewhere to spend time each day of the week. Each day, the person shows up, and his girlfriend does not.

The tune is adopted from another famous Ukrainian song, "Yikhav Kozak za Dunai".

== Example of lyrics ==
Ukrainian lyrics

Ти казала в понедiлок
Пiдем разом по барвінок
Я прийшов, тебе нема,
Підманула, підвела.
Chorus:
Ти ж мене підманула,
Ти ж мене підвела,
Ти ж мене молодого
З ума-розуму звела.
Ти казала у вiвторок
Поцiлуєш разiв сорок
Я прийшов, тебе нема,
Підманула, підвела.
(chorus)
Ти казала у середу
Пiдем разом по череду
Я прийшов, тебе нема,
Підманула, підвела.
(chorus)
Ти казала у четвер
Підем разом на концерт
Я прийшов, тебе нема,
Підманула, підвела.
(chorus)
Ти казала у п'ятницю
Пiдем разом по суницю
Я прийшов, тебе нема,
Підманула, підвела.
(chorus)
Ти казала у суботу
Пiдем разом на роботу
Я прийшов, тебе нема,
Підманула, підвела.
(chorus)
Ти казала у недiлю
Пiдем разом на весiлля
Я прийшов, тебе нема,
Підманула, підвела.
(chorus)

Transliteration

Ty kazala v ponedilok
pidem razom po barvinok
Ya pryishov tebe nema,
Pidmanula, pidvela.
Chorus:
Ty zh mene pidmanula,
Ty zh mene pidvela,
Ty zh mene molodoho
Z uma-rozumu zvela.
Ty kazala u vivtorok
Potsiluiesh raziv sorok
Ya pryishov tebe nema,
Pidmanula, pidvela.
(chorus)
Ty kazala u seredu
Pidem razom po cheredu
Ya pryishov tebe nema,
Pidmanula, pidvela.
(chorus)
Ty kazala u chetver
Pidem razom na kontsert
Ya pryishov tebe nema,
Pidmanula, pidvela.
(chorus)
Ty kazala u piatnytsiu
Pidem razom po sunytsiu
Ya pryishov tebe nema,
Pidmanula, pidvela.
(chorus)
Ty kazala u subotu
Pidem razom na robotu
Ya pryishov tebe nema,
Pidmanula, pidvela.
(chorus)
Ty kazala u nediliu
Pidem razom na vesillia
Ya pryishov tebe nema,
Pidmanula, pidvela.
(chorus)

English translation

You have told me that on Monday
We'll gather periwinkles together
I've come, and there you aren't,
You tricked me and let me down
Chorus:
You tricked me,
You let me down,
You're making me, a young man,
Lose my mind.
You have told me that on Tuesday
You will kiss me forty times
I've come, and there you aren't,
You tricked me and let me down
(chorus)
You have told me that on Wednesday
We'll wrangle up the cattle together
I've come, and there you aren't,
You tricked me and let me down
(chorus)
You have told me that on Thursday
We'll go to the concert together
I've come, and there you aren't,
You tricked me and let me down
(chorus)
You have told me that on Friday
We'll gather wild strawberries together
I've come, and there you aren't,
You tricked me and let me down
(chorus)
You have told me that on Saturday
We'll go to work together
I've come, and there you aren't,
You tricked me and let me down
(chorus)
You have told me that on Sunday
We'll go to the wedding together
I've come, and there you aren't,
You tricked me and let me down
(chorus)

== Performances ==
The song has been performed and arranged by many singers and groups in and outside of Ukraine. Some of the personalities that have recorded the song:

- Duet "Dva Kolyory"
- Dmytro Hnatyuk
- Yaroslav Evdokimov
- Sergei Lemeshev
- VIA Gra
- Choir of Michael Turetsky
- Kalevala, folk metal group from Russia.
- Trio Mandili, a folk girl group from Georgia
- Ahmed Má Hlad, a Czech klezmer-punk band.
