= Yana Batyrshina =

Russian rhythmic gymnast

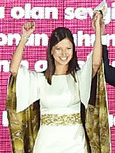

Personal information
- Full name: Yanina Farkhadovna Batyrshina
- Nickname: Yana
- Born: 7 October 1979 (age 46) Tashkent, Uzbek SSR, Soviet Union
- Height: 165 cm (5 ft 5 in)

Gymnastics career
- Discipline: Rhythmic gymnastics
- Country represented: Russia
- Club: Gymnastics Center Novogorsk
- Head coach: Irina Viner
- Retired: 1998
Medal record
Representing Russia
Rhythmic Gymnastics
Olympic Games
Silver medal – second place	1996 Atlanta	All-Around
World Championships
Gold medal – first place	1995 Vienna	Ball
Gold medal – first place	1995 Vienna	Team
Gold medal – first place	1997 Berlin	Rope
Gold medal – first place	1997 Berlin	Team
Silver medal – second place	1996 Budapest	Ribbon
Silver medal – second place	1997 Berlin	Clubs
Bronze medal – third place	1995 Vienna	All-around
Bronze medal – third place	1997 Berlin	All-around
European Championships
Gold medal – first place	1997 Patras	Ribbon
Gold medal – first place	1998 Porto	Rope
Silver medal – second place	1996 Asker	All-around
Silver medal – second place	1996 Asker	Ball
Silver medal – second place	1997 Patras	Rope
Silver medal – second place	1997 Patras	Clubs
Silver medal – second place	1998 Porto	Hoop
Silver medal – second place	1998 Porto	Ribbon
Bronze medal – third place	1998 Porto	All-around
Bronze medal – third place	1998 Porto	Team
Junior European Championships
Gold medal – first place	1993 Bucharest	Rope
Gold medal – first place	1993 Bucharest	Clubs
Silver medal – second place	1993 Bucharest	All-Around
Silver medal – second place	1993 Bucharest	Ball
Silver medal – second place	1993 Bucharest	Ribbon
European Cup Final
Gold medal – first place	1995 Telford	Ribbon
Silver medal – second place	1995 Telford	All-around
Silver medal – second place	1995 Telford	Clubs
Bronze medal – third place	1995 Telford	Rope
Bronze medal – third place	1995 Telford	Ball
Grand Prix Final
Gold medal – first place	1995 Deventer	Hoop
Gold medal – first place	1995 Deventer	Ball
Gold medal – first place	1996 Vienna	All-around
Gold medal – first place	1997 Deventer	Ribbon
Gold medal – first place	1997 Deventer	Hoop
Silver medal – second place	1995 Deventer	Clubs
Silver medal – second place	1995 Deventer	Ribbon
Bronze medal – third place	1995 Deventer	All-around

Yanina "Yana" Farkhadovna Batyrshina (Russian: Янина "Яна" Фархадовна Батыршина; born 7 October 1979) is a former individual rhythmic gymnast who competed for Russia. She is the 1996 Olympics all-around silver medalist, two time (1995,1997) World all-around bronze medalist, two-time European (1996, 1995) all-around silver medalist, the 1998 European all-around bronze medalist and 1996 Grand Prix Final all-around champion.

She was awarded the Medal of the Order For Merit to the Fatherland 2nd class (1997).

== Personal life ==
Batyrshina is of Tatar and Jewish descent. She studied physical education at the Kharkov Institute. She is married to Azerbaijani-Jewish businessman Timur Weinstein; they have two daughters and one son together.

== Career ==
Batyrshina started gymnastics training at 5 years old when a rhythmic gymnast coach approached her father and told the family she was ideal gymnastics material. At 9 years of age, Batyrchina moved to Russia with then Uzbek coach Irina Viner, who became the Russian national team head coach.

Batyrchina began competing internationally in 1993, when she finished second all-around at the European Junior Championships. She also won gold in the individual apparatus finals with rope and clubs and silver with ball and ribbon. She began to compete as a senior in the 1994 season; when she placed much lower in senior competition than she had a junior, she thought about retiring, but her ninth-place finish at the 1994 World Championships encouraged her to remain in the sport.

In 1995, Batyrshina made her senior international breakthrough in Grand Prix events, collecting a total of 15 medals. At the 1995 World Championships, she won the bronze medal in all-around and also took home golds for the team competition and ball. Her results fluctuated in 1996, but she still managed to take the silver medal for the all-around and ball at the 1996 European Championships. At the event finals of 1996 World Championships, she won the silver medal in ribbon.

Batyrshina competed at the 1996 Summer Olympics, but she had a rough start at the preliminaries. She wept after several errant catches left her sitting in 13th place in preliminary round. She performed better in the semifinals, but in the final, during her last event exercise, ribbon, she lost focus in the midst of a simple hand-to-hand exchange and dropped the apparatus. Batyrshina scored 9.683, and while she initially thought she had lost her chance at silver, her score ultimately put her into second place overall ahead of Ukrainian Olena Vitrichenko. She concluded her 1996 season by winning the all-around at the 1996 Grand Prix Final, tied with Yekaterina Serebrianskaya.

During the 1997 season, she won several gold medals on the Grand Prix circuit. She also won the inaugural Longines Prize for Elegance at the 1997 World Championships.

Despite her success and desire to continuing competing through the 2000 Olympics, 1998 presented a new challenge for Batyrshina in the form of up-and-coming new Russian teammate Alina Kabaeva. Kabaeva would go on to win the 1998 European Championships, while Batyrshina would struggle with ribbon and finish third in the all-around. Batyrshina quietly retired a short time after Europeans, at 19 years of age.

After her retirement, Batyrshina began coaching. In 1999, she was briefly invited to serve as a trainer at the UNOPAR gym in Londrina, Brazil, helping prepare the Brazilian group for the 2000 Summer Olympics in Sydney.

On 15 February 2015, a gala was held in Russia for the 80th founding anniversary of rhythmic gymnastics. The venue was held in the historical Mariinsky Theatre in St. Petersburg. Among those who performed at the gala were Russian former Olympic champions, Olympic medalists and World champions including: Batyrshina, Evgenia Kanaeva, Yulia Barsukova, Irina Tchachina, and Daria Dmitrieva.

Since 2025, she hosts her own YouTube show called Элемент Батыршиной (The Batyrshina element), inviting famous rhythmic gymnasts for interviews. She currently works as a TV host and sports commentator for Russian TV channel Матч ТВ.

== Records ==
- Youngest rhythmic gymnast to win the Grand Prix Final all-around title (1996 Vienna) at 16 years of age.

== Influence ==
Batryshina was known for both being extremely flexible and for her leaps and for performing unique elements.

== Detailed Olympic results ==
Year	Competition Description	Location	Music	Apparatus	Score-Final	Score-Qualifying
1996	Olympics	Atlanta		All-around	39.382	37.748
1996	Olympics	Atlanta	Gypsy Dance music from Don Quixote by Leon Minkus	Ribbon	9.683	9.316
1996	Olympics	Atlanta	Moorish Dance from Othello by Machavariani	Rope	9.850	9.816
1996	Olympics	Atlanta	Young Prince and Princess from Scheherazade by Nikolay Rimsky-Korsakov	Ball	9.916	9.266
1996	Olympics	Atlanta	Act 1 – Appearance Of Kitri / Act 1 – Variation: Kitri music from Don Quixote by Leon Minkus	Clubs	9.933	9.350

== See also ==
- List of select Jewish gymnasts
