= Eva Serrano =

French rhythmic gymnast (born 1978)

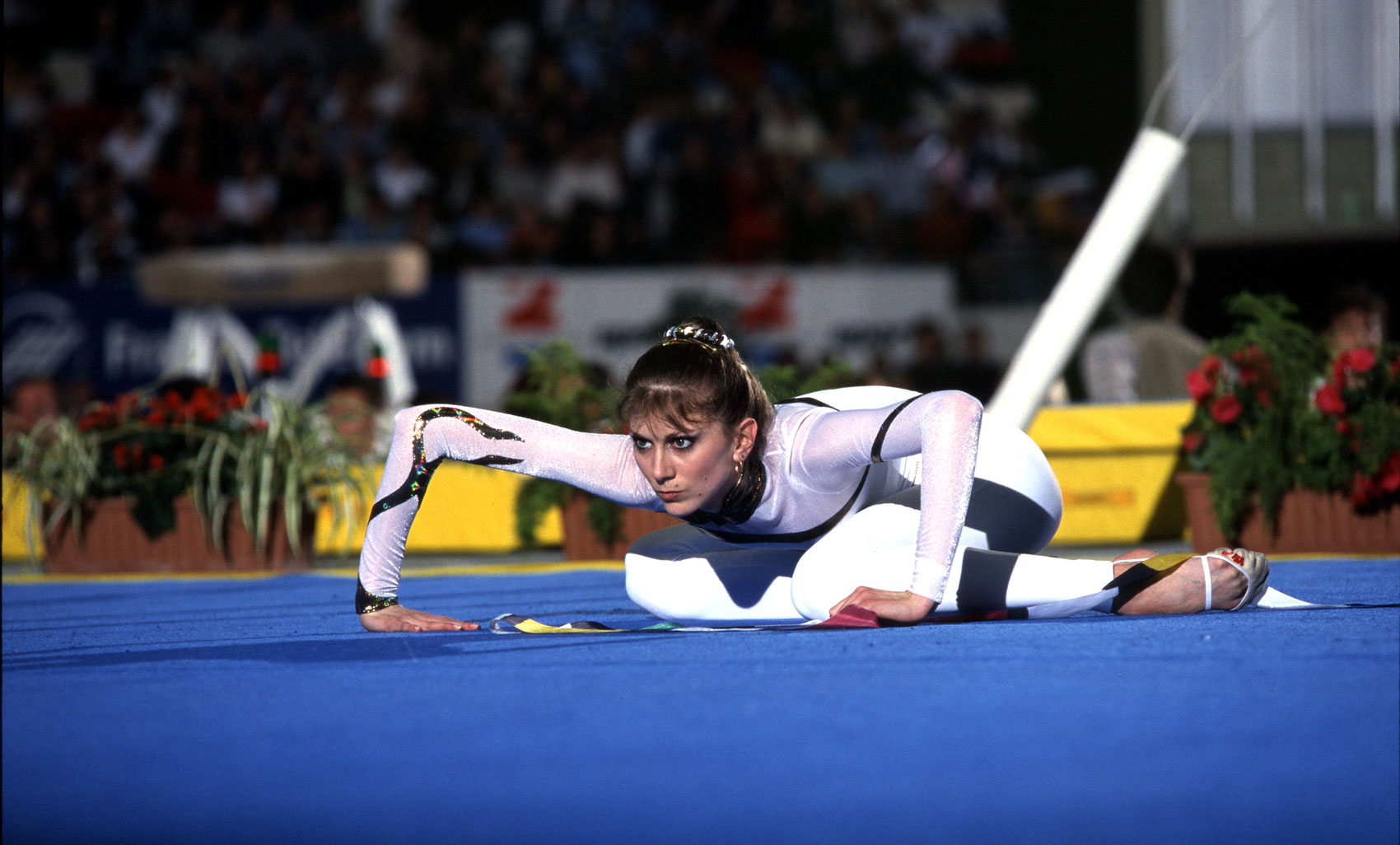
- Serrano in 1998

Personal information
- Born: 22 April 1978 (age 48) Nîmes, France

Gymnastics career
- Discipline: Rhythmic gymnastics
- Country represented: France
Medal record
Representing France
World Championships
| Bronze medal – third place | 1997 Berlin | Hoop |
| Bronze medal – third place | 1997 Berlin | Ribbon |
European Championships
| Gold medal – first place | 2000 Zaragoza | Hoop |
| Silver medal – second place | 1997 Patras | Rope |
| Silver medal – second place | 1997 Patras | Ribbon |
| Silver medal – second place | 1998 Porto | Clubs |
| Silver medal – second place | 2000 Zaragoza | Ribbon |
| Bronze medal – third place | 1998 Porto | Hoop |
| Bronze medal – third place | 1999 Budapest | All-around |
| Bronze medal – third place | 1999 Budapest | Ball |
Summer Universiade
| Gold medal – first place | 1997 Sicily | Hoop |
| Bronze medal – third place | 1997 Sicily | Rope |

Eva Serrano (born 22 April 1978 in Nîmes) is a French former individual rhythmic gymnast. She competed at two Olympic Games (1996, 2000), was the 1999 European all-around bronze medalist and is France's most decorated and successful rhythmic gymnast. She is also a six-time consecutive French National all-around champion (1993-1998).

== Career ==
Serrano's international career spanned eight years, and she competed in two Olympic cycles. She started rhythmic gymnastics at age eight. Serrano competed at her first World Championships in 1992, where she placed 26th; the following year, she placed 19th, which was the last year she placed outside of the top 10 at the World Championships.

She placed 7th at the 1994 World Championships, which was the first time a French gymnast had placed within the top 16 at the World Championships, and 9th in the 1995 World Championships. At the 1996 Summer Olympics in Atlanta, she placed 7th in qualifications, 8th in the semi-final round and placed 6th in the finals.

She made her career breakthrough in 1997, winning France's first European Championship medals (silver with rope and ribbon). She repeated her success by winning two bronze medals (hoop, ribbon) at the 1997 World Championships, where she placed 7th after a poor all-around hoop exercise. She won two more, a silver (clubs) and bronze (hoop), at the 1998 European Championships, where she placed 4th overall. In an interview, Serrano noted the difficulty of receiving recognition as a French gymnast in a discipline traditionally dominated by Eastern European countries such as Russia and Bulgaria.

Early in 1999, Serrano competed in the International 3-on-3 event at the American Cup; the event featured teams of a rhythmic gymnast, men's artistic gymnast, and women's artistic gymnast from each country participating in the event. Serrano received a good score of 9.787 for her ball routine, but mistakes from her teammates Ludivine Furnon and Yann Cucherat meant that the French team finished 8th.

At the 1999 European Championships, she won the all-around bronze medal in addition to a bronze in the ball final. She also competed at the 1999 World Championships and finished in 4th place.

She was 4th in the all-around at the 2000 European Championships and qualified for every apparatus final; she won gold with hoop and silver with ribbon. She went on to compete in her second Olympics in 2000 Sydney, where she placed 4th in qualifications and finished 5th in the finals. Serrano's final competition was the Zenith Tournament in Paris in December 2000, where she won every gold medals. She shared the ball title with her friend Olena Vitrychenko. The Zenith event also served as a tribute, as Serrano announced her retirement.

She was elected to sit as the first president of the International Gymnastics Federation Athletes' Commission, a position she held until 2009. Serrano became a judge in 2003 and has judged at international events such as the European Championships. She has a son named Oihan, born in 2008.
