= 1998 Goodwill Games =

International sports event held in New York City

- Official logo of the games.
- Host city: New York City, New York
- Country: USA
- Nations: 66
- Athletes: 1500
- Opening: 19 July 1998
- Closing: 2 August 1998

The 1998 Goodwill Games was the fourth edition of the international sports competition the Goodwill Games, which were created by Ted Turner in reaction to the political troubles surrounding the Olympic Games of the 1980s. The competition was held in and around New York City in the United States from July 19 to August 2, 1998. Approximately 1,500 athletes from 66 countries participated, competing in 15 sports.

The United States topped the medal table of the games with 41 gold medals and 132 medals in total. In second place was Russia, with 35 gold medals and 94 medals in total. Cuba finished in third place, with 8 gold medals and 17 medals in total.

Athletes who won gold medals at the 1998 Goodwill Games include Michelle Kwan, Dominique Moceanu, Michael Johnson, Jackie Joyner-Kersee, Dan O'Brien, Félix Savón, Jenny Thompson and Alexander Popov. Approximately 1,500 athletes from more of 66 countries participated, competing in 15 sports.

Two world records were broken at these Games, one by the American relay in the 4×400 meters in athletics, and the other by South African swimmer Penny Heyns in the 50 meters breaststroke. The event is also notable for a training accident involving Chinese gymnast Sang Lan, which injured her spinal cord and left her partially paralyzed.

== Sports ==
- Athletics
- Basketball
- Beach volleyball
- Boxing
- Cycling
- Diving
- Figure skating
- Gymnastics
- Soccer
- Swimming
- Synchronized swimming
- Triathlon
- Water polo
- Wrestling

== Venues ==
Some events were held in New York City, while many were held in nearby suburbs in Long Island, including Uniondale.

- Central Park (triathlon finish)
- Madison Square Garden (basketball)
- Mitchel Athletic Complex (athletics, soccer)
- Nassau County Aquatic Center (diving, swimming, synchronized swimming, water polo)
- Nassau Veterans Memorial Coliseum (figure skating, rhythmic and artistic gymnastics)
- New York Harbor (triathlon start)
- The Theater at Madison Square Garden (boxing, wrestling)
- Wagner College Stadium (cycling)
- Wollman Rink (beach volleyball)

== Participating nations ==
The following nations were invited to the games:

- Algeria
- Argentina
- Armenia
- Australia
- Bahamas
- Belarus
- Belgium
- Brazil
- Bulgaria
- Canada
- China
- Colombia
- Costa Rica
- Cuba
- Czech Republic
- Denmark
- Ecuador
- Egypt
- Estonia
- Ethiopia
- Finland
- France
- Georgia
- Germany
- Great Britain
- Greece
- Hungary
- Iceland
- Iran
- Ireland
- Italy
- Jamaica
- Japan
- Kazakhstan
- Kenya
- Lithuania
- Mexico
- Mongolia
- Morocco
- Mozambique
- Netherlands
- New Zealand
- Nigeria
- Norway
- Philippines
- Poland
- Portugal
- Puerto Rico
- Romania
- Russia
- Slovenia
- South Africa
- South Korea
- Spain
- Sweden
- Switzerland
- Syria
- Trinidad and Tobago
- Turkey
- Uganda
- Ukraine
- United States
- Uzbekistan
- Venezuela
- Zambia
- Zimbabwe

== Medal table ==
Place	Nation	1st place, gold medalist(s)	2nd place, silver medalist(s)	3rd place, bronze medalist(s)	Total
1	United States	41	49	42	132
2	Russia	35	29	30	94
3	Cuba	8	5	4	17
4	China	7	7	6	20
5	Kenya	5	4	4	13
6	Germany	3	3	10	16
7	Australia	2	6	2	10
8	Belarus	2	5	2	9
9	Jamaica	2	2	5	9
10	Iran	2	1	1	4
11	Brazil	2	0	1	3
12	Kazakhstan	2	0	1	3
13	United Kingdom	2	0	0	2
14	Ukraine	1	5	4	10
15	Romania	1	3	5	9
16	Trinidad and Tobago	1	1	0	2
17	Czech Republic	1	0	1	2
17	Italy	1	0	1	2
17	Uzbekistan	1	0	1	2
20	Algeria	1	0	0	1
20	Mozambique	1	0	0	1
20	Nigeria	1	0	0	1
23	Bulgaria	0	2	2	4
24	France	0	2	1	3
25	Mexico	0	2	0	2
26	Turkey	0	1	5	6
27	Morocco	0	1	1	2
27	Poland	0	1	1	2
27	Japan	0	1	1	2
30	Bahamas	0	1	0	1
30	Canada	0	1	0	1
30	Nigeria	0	1	0	1
30	Spain	0	1	0	1
30	World All-Stars (Cycling)	0	1	0	1
35	Argentina	0	0	1	1
35	Armenia	0	0	1	1
35	Ecuador	0	0	1	1
35	Greece	0	0	1	1
35	Hungary	0	0	1	1
35	Iceland	0	0	1	1
35	Lithuania	0	0	1	1
35	Norway	0	0	1	1
35	Philippines	0	0	1	1
