= Larisa Lukyanenko =

Belarusian rhythmic gymnast (born 1973)

Larissa Lukyanenko
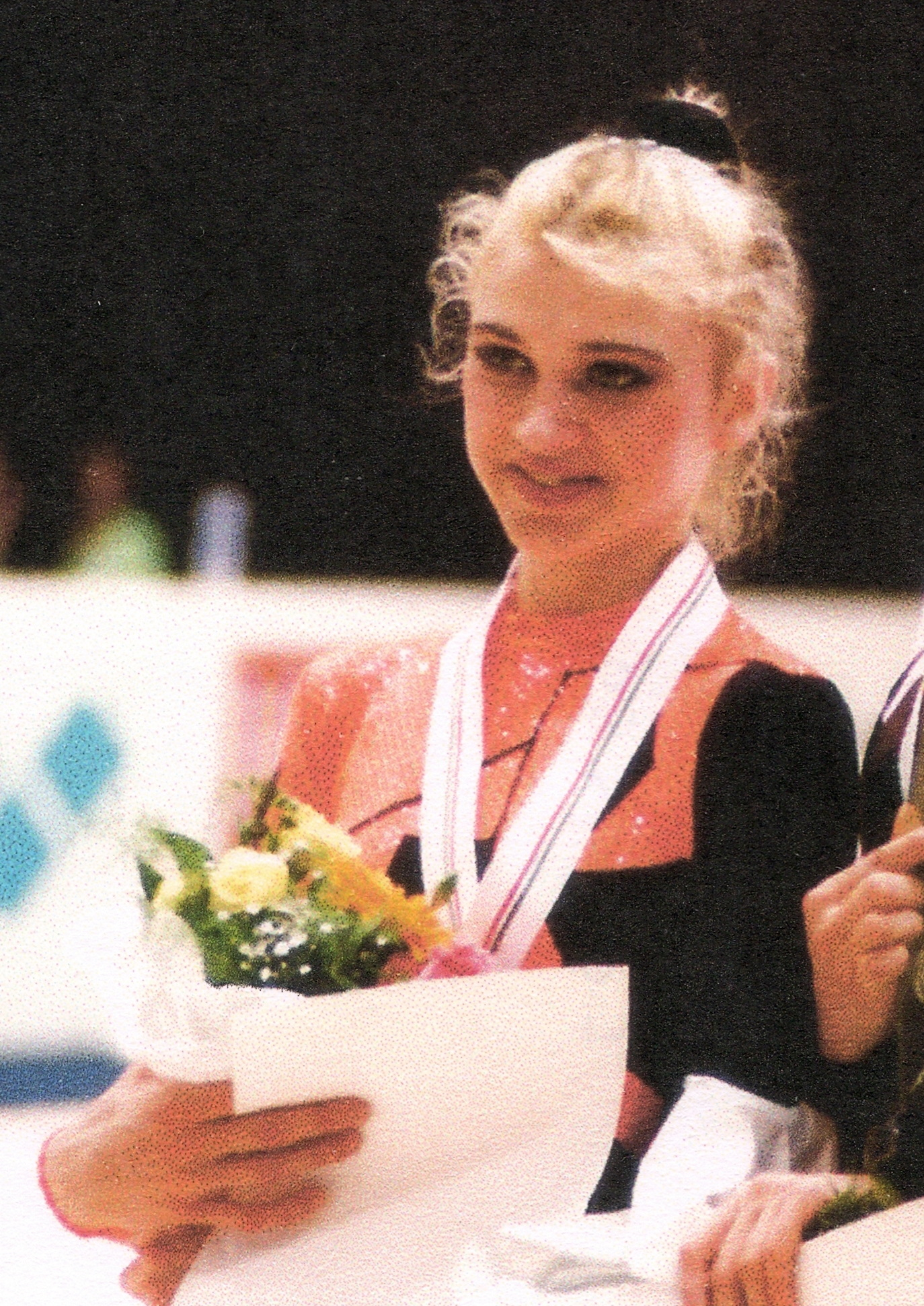
- Loukianenko at the 1996 World Championships

Personal information
- Born: 7 August 1973 (age 53) Krasnoyarsk, Russia

Gymnastics career
- Discipline: Rhythmic gymnastics
- Country represented: Belarus
- Head coaches: Galina Krylenko, Irina Leparskaya
Medal record
Representing Belarus
World Championships
Gold medal – first place	1992 Brussels	Rope
Gold medal – first place	1992 Brussels	Hoop
Gold medal – first place	1994 Paris	Hoop
Gold medal – first place	1995 Vienna	Rope
Gold medal – first place	1996 Budapest	Rope
Silver medal – second place	1994 Paris	All-around
Silver medal – second place	1995 Vienna	Ribbon
Silver medal – second place	1996 Budapest	Ball
Bronze medal – third place	1992 Brussels	All-around
Bronze medal – third place	1995 Vienna	All-around
European Championships
Gold medal – first place	1992 Stuttgart	Hoop
Gold medal – first place	1994 Thessaloniki	Clubs
Silver medal – second place	1992 Stuttgart	Team
Silver medal – second place	1994 Thessaloniki	Team
Silver medal – second place	1996 Asker	Ribbon
Silver medal – second place	1996 Asker	Team
Bronze medal – third place	1992 Stuttgart	Ball
Bronze medal – third place	1994 Thessaloniki	Ball
Bronze medal – third place	1996 Asker	Rope
European Cup Final
Gold medal – first place	1993 Málaga	Ball
Gold medal – first place	1993 Málaga	Clubs
Gold medal – first place	1995 Telford	Rope
Gold medal – first place	1995 Telford	Ball
Silver medal – second place	1993 Málaga	All-around
Silver medal – second place	1993 Málaga	Hoop
Silver medal – second place	1993 Málaga	Ribbon

Larisa Gennadyevna Lukyanenko (Russian: Лариса Геннадьевна Лукьяненко; born 7 August 1973) is a former Belarusian individual rhythmic gymnast.

== Career ==
Loukianenko took up rhythmic gymnastics in 1980 at age 7. She was coached by Galina Krylenko at Club Dynamo in Minsk. She emerged as a top class competitor at the 1992 World Rhythmic Gymnastics Championships in Brussels, Belgium. A broken ankle prevented her from competing in the 1993 World Championships and it took her nearly a year to recover. She made a comeback at the 1994 European Championships. She swept the 1993 Grand Prix Final winning the All-around and the event finals in hoop, ball, clubs and ribbon.

Loukianenko's best apparatus was rope; she became a three-time World Champion on this apparatus.

She participated at the 1996 Olympic Games, and ranked 5th in the AA semi-finals and 7th in the AA finals. She retired at age 23 in 1996.

Loukianenko is currently a coach and judge for the Belarusian Gymnastics Federation. She and her former teammate, Tatiana Ogrizko, used to coach Melitina Staniouta.
