= 1996 World Rhythmic Gymnastics Championships =

- Location: Budapest, Hungary
- Start date: 19 June 1996
- End date: 23 June 1996

XX World Rhythmic Gymnastics Championships were held in Budapest, the capital of Hungary, 19–23 June, 1996. There was no all-around for individuals, only event finals; gymnasts qualified through the results of the World Championships 1995 in Vienna and could only start in two finals.

A sports science symposium focused on rhythmic gymnastics was held in conjunction with the event by the Hungarian University of Sport Sciences.

== Medal winners ==
Event	Gold	Silver	Bronze
Individual Finals
Rope	Larissa Lukyanenko (BLR)	Kateryna Serebrianska (UKR)	Diana Popova (BUL)
Ball	Kateryna Serebrianska (UKR)	Larissa Lukyanenko (BLR); Maria Petrova (BUL); Amina Zaripova (RUS)	None awarded
Clubs	Amina Zaripova (RUS)	Elena Vitrychenko (UKR)	Maria Petrova (BUL)
Ribbon	Elena Vitrychenko (UKR)	Yana Batyrshina (RUS)	Evgenia Pavlina (BLR)
Groups
All-Around	Bulgaria	Spain	Belarus
5 Hoops Final	Belarus	Russia	Ukraine
3 Balls + 2 Ribbons Final	Spain	Russia	Belarus

== Individual ==
=== Individual Ball ===
Place	Nation	Name	Result
1	(Ukraine)	Ekaterina Serebrianskaya	10.000
2	(Belarus)	Larissa Lukianenko	9.950
2	(Bulgaria)	Maria Petrova	9.950
2	(Russia)	Amina Zaripova	9.950
5	(France)	Eva Serrano	9.800
6	(Spain)	Almudena Cid	9.750
7	(Germany)	Magdalena Brzeska	9.733
8	(Romania)	Alina Stoica	9.700

=== Individual Clubs ===
Place	Nation	Name	Result
1	(Russia)	Amina Zaripova	10.000
2	(Ukraine)	Elena Vitrichenko	9.950
3	(Bulgaria)	Maria Petrova	9.933
4	(France)	Eva Serrano	9.916
5	(Germany)	Magdalena Brzeska	9.883
6	(Belarus)	Evgenia Pavlina	9.766
7	(Italy)	Irene Germini	9.716
8	(Romania)	Alina Stoica	9.813

=== Individual Rope ===
Place	Nation	Name	Result
1	(Belarus)	Larissa Lukianenko	9.950
2	(Ukraine)	Ekaterina Serebrianskaya	9.933
3	(Bulgaria)	Diana Popova	9.800
4	(Spain)	Almudena Cid	9.716
5	(Russia)	Yanina Batyrchina	9.699
6	(Greece)	Maria Pagalou	9.650
7	(Italy)	Katia Pietrosanti	9.582
8	(Hungary)	Viktoria Frater	9.500

=== Individual Ribbon ===
Place	Nation	Name	Result
1	(Ukraine)	Elena Vitrichenko	10.000
2	(Russia)	Yanina Batyrchina	9.983
3	(Belarus)	Evgenia Pavlina	9.950
4	(Bulgaria)	Diana Popova	9.866
5	(Italy)	Katia Pietrosanti	9.750
6	(Spain)	Alba Caride	9.716
7	(Hungary)	Viktoria Frater	9.616
8	(Greece)	Maria Pangalou	9.600

== Groups ==
=== Groups All-Around ===
Rank	Nation	5	3 + 2	Total
1st place, gold medalist(s)	Bulgaria	19.800	19.800	39.600
2nd place, silver medalist(s)	Spain	19.700	19.700	39.400
3rd place, bronze medalist(s)	Belarus	19.733	19.600	39.333
4	Russia	19.600	19.566	39.166
5	Ukraine	19.366	19.500	38.866
6	Japan	19.166	19.333	38.499
7	Italy	19.066	19.400	38.466
8	Hungary	18.766	19.166	37.932
9	China	18.999	18.666	37.665
10	Canada	18.666	18.866	37.532
11	France	18.800	18.666	37.466
12	Kazakhstan	18.133	18.433	36.567
13	Slovakia	18.132	18.400	36.532
14	Finland	18.033	18.366	36.399
15	USA	17.599	18.733	36.332
16	Lithuania	17.900	18.299	36.199
17	Netherlands	17.800	18.233	36.033
18	Czech Republic	17.533	18.466	35.999
19	Estonia	17.633	18.200	35.833
20	Portugal	17.366	18.133	35.499
21	Brazil	17.499	17.999	35.498
22	South Korea	17.766	17.099	34.865
23	Argentina	17.299	15.766	33.065

=== Groups 3 Balls + 2 Ribbons Final ===
Place	Nation	Result
1	Spain	19.816
2	Russia	19.800
3	Belarus	19.700
4	Ukraine	19.366
5	Italy	19.183
6	China	19.032
7	Bulgaria	19.000
8	Japan	18.666

=== Groups 5 Hoops Final ===
Place	Nation	Result
1	Belarus	19.866
2	Russia	19.816
3	Ukraine	19.733
4	Spain	19.699
5	Japan	19.500
6	Hungary	19.433
7	Italy	19.258
8	Bulgaria	18.833
