= 1995 World Rhythmic Gymnastics Championships =

- Location: Vienna, Austria
- Start date: 20 September 1995
- End date: 24 September 1995

The XIX World Rhythmic Gymnastics Championships were held in Vienna, the capital of Austria, 20–24 September, 1995. There were 97 individual participants from 43 countries.

The event acted as the qualifying competition for the 1996 Summer Olympics, with 35 individual gymnasts and 7 groups qualifying based on the results of the first day of competition. As the host of the upcoming Olympics, the United States was given an automatic berth in the group competition and did not send one to compete.

A number of ties were awarded at the event, including for the all-around title, shared by defending World all-around champion Maria Petrova and Kateryna Serebrianska, the defending World champion in all four event titles. This was Petrova's third consecutive World title; she tied this record with Maria Gigova. Bronze medalist Larisa Lukyanenko tied the two gold medalists after the first two events, but following the last two, she dropped to win bronze along with Yana Batyrshina.

The number of gymnasts in groups was reduced after the previous year from six to five.

== Medal winners ==
Event	Gold	Silver	Bronze
Individual Finals
Rope	Larissa Lukyanenko (BLR)	Maria Petrova (BUL); Kateryna Serebrianska (UKR); Elena Vitrychenko (UKR)	None awarded
Ball	Yana Batyrshina (RUS); Kateryna Serebrianska (UKR); Amina Zaripova (RUS)	None awarded	None awarded
Clubs	Maria Petrova (BUL); Amina Zaripova (RUS)	None awarded	Kateryna Serebrianska (UKR); Elena Vitrychenko (UKR)
Ribbon	Elena Vitrychenko (UKR)	Larissa Lukyanenko (BLR); Amina Zaripova (RUS)	None awarded
Individual All-Around	Maria Petrova (BUL); Kateryna Serebrianska (UKR)	None awarded	Yana Batyrshina (RUS); Larissa Lukyanenko (BLR)
Team All-Around	Russia; Yana Batyrshina; Amina Zaripova; Natalia Lipkovskaya	Bulgaria; Maria Petrova; Diana Popova	Ukraine; Kateryna Serebrianska; Elena Vitrychenko; Victoria Stadnik
Groups
All-Around	Bulgaria	Spain	Belarus
5 Hoops Final	Bulgaria	Spain	Belarus
3 Balls + 2 Ribbons Final	Spain	Bulgaria	Russia

== Participants ==
The following countries sent competitors: Argentina, Australia, Austria, Azerbaijan, Belgium, Belarus, Brazil, Bulgaria, Canada, China, Croatia, Cyprus, Czech Republic, Estonia, Finland, France, Georgia, Germany, Greece, Hungary, Israel, Italy, Japan, Kazakhstan, Lithuania, Moldova, The Netherlands, New Zealand, Norway, Poland, Portugal, Romania, Russia, Slovakia, Slovenia, South Korea, Spain, Sweden, Thailand, Turkmenistan, Ukraine, the United Kingdom and the United States.

=== Individual entrants ===
- Argentina: Alejandra Unsain, Cecilia Schtutman
- Australia: Kasumi Takahashi, Leigh Marning
- Austria: Birgit Schilien, Nina Taborsky
- Azerbaijan: Natalya Bulanova, Alfia Kukshinova, Nurdjahan Aliyeva
- Belarus: Larissa Lukyanenko, Evgenia Pavlina
- Belgium: Cindy Stollenberg, Lorrie Degroote, Isabelle Massage
- Brazil: Camila Ferezin, Luciana Barichello, Dayane Camilo
- Bulgaria: Maria Petrova, Diana Popova
- Canada: Erika-Leigh Stirton, Lindsay Richards, Gretchen McLennan
- China: Xiaojing Zhou, Wu Bei
- Croatia: Ana Cerovec, Kristina Bajza, Josipa Jurinec
- Cyprus: Panaiyota Kimonos, Popi Sofocleous
- Czech Republic: Lenka Oulehlova, Andrea Sebestova
- Estonia: Natalja Kornysheva, Jekaterina Gorgul
- Finland: Katri Kalpala, Hanna Laiho
- France: Eva Serrano, Amélie Villeneuve
- (Georgia (country)) Georgia: Ekaterina Abramia, Ekaterina Pevkina
- Germany: Magdalena Brzeska, Kristin Sroka
- Greece: Maria Pagalou, Victoria Gogou
- Hungary: Viktoria Frater, Andrea Szalay
- Israel: Svetlana Tokayev, Sivan Fischler
- Italy: Katia Pietrosanti, Irene Germini, Laura Zacchilli
- Japan: Miho Yamada, Akane Yamao, Mutsuko Tahara
- Kazakhstan: Yulia Yourtchenko, Valeria Khairoulina, Lyudmila Popova
- Lithuania: Kristina Kliukevichute, Audrone Lingyte
- Moldova: Natalia Fiodorova, Olga Vanitckina, Ella Dumbrava
- The Netherlands: Lucinda Schuurman, Ramona Stook
- New Zealand: Simone Clark, Belinda Moore
- Norway: Marianne Myhrer, Siri Kjeksrud
- Poland: Anna Kwitniewska, Krystyna Leskiewicz
- Portugal: Joana Raposo, Susana Nascimento
- Romania: Alina Stoica, Filis Șerif, Dana Carteleanu
- Russia: Yana Batyrshina, Natalia Lipkovskaya, Amina Zaripova
- Slovakia: Zuzana Dobiasova, Ivana Motolíková
- Slovenia: Nina Piletic, Erika Rakusa, Ana Kokalj
- South Korea: Kim Yoo-Kyung, Kwon Bo-Young, Kim Eun-Hae
- Spain: Almudena Cid, Alba Caride
- Sweden: Hanna Koehler
- Thailand: Wannarudee Hansomboon, Yeansukon Aunchaya
- Turkmenistan: Tatyana Lobanova
- Ukraine: Ekaterina Serebrianskaya, Elena Vitrichenko, Victoria Stadnik
- United Kingdom: Aicha McKenzie, Alison Deehan
- United States: Jessica Davis, Tina Tharp

== Individual ==
=== Individual All-Around ===
Place	Nation	Name	Total
1	Bulgaria	Maria Petrova	39.800
1	Ukraine	Ekaterina Serebrianskaya	39.800
3	Belarus	Larissa Lukianenko	39.700
3	Russia	Yanina Batyrchina	39.700
5	Russia	Amina Zaripova	39.575
6	Ukraine	Elena Vitrichenko	39.550
7	Bulgaria	Diana Popova	39.125
8	Germany	Magdalena Brzeska	38.850
9	France	Eva Serrano	38.475
10	Belarus	Yevgeniya Pavlina	38.025

=== Individual Ball ===
Place	Nation	Name	Result
1	Russia	Yanina Batyrchina	9.950
1	Russia	Amina Zaripova	9.950
1	Ukraine	Ekaterina Serebrianskaya	9.950
4	Bulgaria	Maria Petrova	9.900
5	Belarus	Larissa Lukianenko	9.850
6	Bulgaria	Diana Popova	9.750
7	France	Eva Serrano	9.700
7	Germany	Magdalena Brzeska	9.700

=== Individual Rope ===
Place	Nation	Name	Result
1	Belarus	Larissa Lukianenko	9.950
2	Bulgaria	Maria Petrova	9.925
2	Ukraine	Ekaterina Serebrianskaya	9.925
2	Ukraine	Elena Vitrichenko	9.925
5	Russia	Yanina Batyrchina	9.900
6	Bulgaria	Diana Popova	9.750
6	Russia	Natalia Lipkovskaya	9.750
8	Germany	Magdalena Brzeska	9.700

=== Individual Clubs ===
Place	Nation	Name	Result
1	Bulgaria	Maria Petrova	9.950
1	Russia	Amina Zaripova	9.950
3	Ukraine	Ekaterina Serebrianskaya	9.925
3	Ukraine	Elena Vitrichenko	9.925
5	Belarus	Larissa Lukianenko	9.900
6	Russia	Natalia Lipkovskaya	9.775
7	France	Eva Serrano	9.725
7	Germany	Magdalena Brzeska	9.725

=== Individual Ribbon ===
Place	Nation	Name	Result
1	Ukraine	Elena Vitrichenko	9.950
2	Belarus	Larissa Lukianenko	9.925
2	Russia	Amina Zaripova	9.925
4	Bulgaria	Diana Popova	9.800
4	Russia	Yanina Batyrchina	9.800
6	France	Eva Serrano	9.775
7	Germany	Magdalena Brzeska	9.725
8	Bulgaria	Maria Petrova	9.400

=== Team All-Around ===
Place	Nation	Total
1	Russia	78.100
2	Bulgaria	77.600
3	Ukraine	77.450
4	Belarus	76.850
5	Spain	75.200
6	Germany	74.850
7	Italy	74.800
8	Romania	74.6oo

== Groups ==
=== Groups All-Around ===
Place	Nation	5 Hoops	3 Balls, 2 Ribbons	Total
1	Bulgaria	19.800	19.775	39.575
2	Spain	19.750	19.650	39.400
3	Belarus	19.550	19.525	39.075
4	Russia	19.025	19.725	38.750
5	France	19.350	19.250	38.600
5	Germany	19.350	19.250	38.600
7	Italy	19.150	19.400	38.550
8	China	19.325	19.200	38.525
9	Ukraine	19.200	19.250	38.450
10	...			

=== Groups 5 Hoops ===
Place	Nation	Total
1	Bulgaria	19.825
2	Spain	19.800
3	Belarus	19.600
4	China	19.475
5	France	19.375
6	Germany	19.300
7	Ukraine	19.275
8	Japan	18.825

=== Groups 3 Balls + 2 Ribbons ===
Place	Nation	Total
1	Spain	19.800
2	Bulgaria	19.775
3	Russia	19.650
4	Italy	19.375
5	Belarus	19.200
6	Germany	19.050
7	France	18.850
7	Greece	18.850
