= List of gymnasts at the 1996 Summer Olympics =

This is a list of the gymnasts who represented their country at the 1996 Summer Olympics in Atlanta from 19 July to 4 August 1996. Gymnasts in two disciplines (artistic gymnastics and rhythmic gymnastics) participated in the Games.

== Women's artistic gymnastics ==
	Name	Country	Date of birth (Age)
Youngest competitor	Ji Liya	China	20 October 1981 (aged 14)
Oldest competitor	Eszter Óváry	Hungary	11 October 1972 (aged 23)

NOC	Name	Date of birth (Age)	Hometown
Argentina	Ana Destéfano	23 May 1981 (aged 15)	
Australia	Joanna Hughes	22 December 1977 (aged 18)	Melbourne, Victoria
Australia	Nicole Kantek	6 July 1981 (aged 15)	Liverpool, New South Wales
Australia	Ruth Moniz	20 September 1977 (aged 18)	Adelaide, South Australia
Australia	Lisa Moro	22 June 1981 (aged 15)	Melbourne, Victoria
Australia	Lisa Skinner	17 February 1981 (aged 15)	Clear Mountain, Queensland
Australia	Jenny Smith	31 March 1980 (aged 16)	Perth, Western Australia
Belarus	Svetlana Boginskaya	9 February 1973 (aged 23)	Minsk, Belarus
Belarus	Elena Piskun	2 February 1978 (aged 18)	Minsk, Belarus
Belarus	Alena Polozkova	11 August 1979 (aged 16)	Mogilev, Belarus
Belarus	Svetlana Tarasevich	14 August 1979 (aged 16)	Grodno, Belarus
Belarus	Ludmila Vityukova	12 October 1978 (aged 17)	Babruysk, Belarus
Belarus	Olga Yurkina	21 September 1979 (aged 16)	Minsk, Belarus
Belarus	Tatyana Zharganova	24 July 1980 (aged 15)	Grodno, Belarus
Bulgaria	Veselina Gencheva	26 May 1981 (aged 15)	Sofia, Bulgaria
Canada	Jennifer Exaltacion	6 August 1979 (aged 16)	Windsor, Ontario
Canada	Shanyn MacEachern	17 February 1980 (aged 16)	Brampton, Ontario
Canada	Yvonne Tousek	23 February 1980 (aged 16)	Kitchener, Ontario
China	Bi Wenjing	28 July 1981 (aged 14)	Xintai, Shandong
China	Ji Liya	20 October 1981 (aged 14)	Hengyang, Hunan
China	Kui Yuanyuan	23 June 1981 (aged 15)	Xicheng District, Beijing
China	Liu Xuan	12 August 1979 (aged 16)	Changsha, Hunan
China	Mao Yanling	24 February 1980 (aged 16)	
China	Mo Huilan	19 July 1979 (aged 17)	Guilin, Guangxi
China	Qiao Ya	10 January 1977 (aged 19)	Shashi District, Hubei
Czech Republic	Gabriela Krčmářová	16 March 1978 (aged 18)	Karviná, Czech Republic
France	Cécile Canqueteau	3 October 1979 (aged 16)	Paris, France
France	Ludivine Furnon	4 October 1980 (aged 15)	Nîmes, France
France	Laure Gély	5 February 1979 (aged 17)	Saint-Étienne, France
France	Isabelle Severino	9 April 1980 (aged 16)	Paris, France
France	Elvire Teza	29 March 1981 (aged 15)	Saint-Denis, Réunion
France	Orélie Troscompt	28 May 1981 (aged 15)	Vevey, Switzerland
France	Émilie Volle	8 October 1981 (aged 14)	Saint-Étienne, France
Germany	Yvonne Pioch	15 March 1980 (aged 16)	Neubrandenburg, Germany
Germany	Kathleen Stark	9 September 1975 (aged 20)	Rostock, Germany
Great Britain	Sonia Lawrence	19 January 1980 (aged 16)	Caerphilly, Wales
Great Britain	Annika Reeder	28 September 1979 (aged 16)	Epping, England
Greece	Kyriaki Firinidou	8 September 1980 (aged 15)	Thessaloniki, Greece
Greece	Virginia Karentzou	25 June 1978 (aged 18)	Thessaloniki, Greece
Greece	Aikaterini Mamouti	23 May 1981 (aged 15)	Thessaloniki, Greece
Greece	Konstantina Margariti	27 November 1980 (aged 15)	Athens, Greece
Greece	Kyriaki Papanikolaou	28 February 1980 (aged 16)	Thessaloniki, Greece
Greece	Georgia Tempou	23 April 1980 (aged 16)	Thessaloniki, Greece
Greece	Vasiliki Tsavdaridou	29 October 1980 (aged 15)	Thessaloniki, Greece
Hungary	Ildikó Balog	7 November 1977 (aged 18)	Békéscsaba, Hungary
Hungary	Nikolett Krausz	20 May 1981 (aged 15)	Budapest, Hungary
Hungary	Andrea Molnár	3 March 1975 (aged 21)	Budapest, Hungary
Hungary	Adrienn Nyeste	14 December 1978 (aged 17)	Mezőhegyes, Hungary
Hungary	Henrietta Ónodi	22 May 1974 (aged 22)	Békéscsaba, Hungary
Hungary	Eszter Óváry	11 October 1972 (aged 23)	Budapest, Hungary
Hungary	Adrienn Varga	6 August 1980 (aged 15)	Gyula, Hungary
Italy	Francesca Morotti	28 November 1979 (aged 16)	Calcinate, Italy
Italy	Giordana Rocchi	28 September 1980 (aged 15)	Rome, Italy
Japan	Miho Hashiguchi	29 December 1977 (aged 18)	Aichi Prefecture, Japan
Japan	Naho Hoshiyama	25 December 1980 (aged 15)	Tokyo, Japan
Japan	Hanako Miura	28 March 1975 (aged 21)	Hiroshima Prefecture, Japan
Japan	Satsuki Obata	24 May 1977 (aged 19)	Shiga Prefecture, Japan
Japan	Masumi Okawa	13 November 1978 (aged 17)	Shizuoka Prefecture, Japan
Japan	Aya Sekine	12 April 1978 (aged 18)	Gunma Prefecture, Japan
Japan	Risa Sugawara	15 August 1977 (aged 18)	Toda, Japan
Kazakhstan	Olga Kozhevnikova	28 August 1980 (aged 15)	Almaty, Kazakhstan
Latvia	Ludmila Prince	2 January 1975 (aged 21)	Riga, Latvia
Morocco	Naima El-Rhouati	19 July 1976 (aged 20)	Youssoufia, Morocco
Portugal	Diana Teixeira	12 April 1981 (aged 15)	Porto, Portugal
Puerto Rico	Eileen Díaz	1 November 1979 (aged 16)	Río Piedras, Puerto Rico
Romania	Simona Amânar	7 October 1979 (aged 16)	Constanța, Romania
Romania	Gina Gogean	9 September 1977 (aged 18)	Câmpuri, Romania
Romania	Ionela Loaieș	1 February 1979 (aged 17)	Comănești, Romania
Romania	Alexandra Marinescu	19 March 1981 (aged 15)	Bucharest, Romania
Romania	Lavinia Miloșovici	21 October 1976 (aged 19)	Lugoj, Romania
Romania	Mirela Țugurlan	4 September 1980 (aged 15)	Focșani, Romania
Russia	Elena Dolgopolova	23 January 1980 (aged 16)	Volzhsky, Russia
Russia	Roza Galiyeva	28 April 1977 (aged 19)	Olmaliq, Uzbekistan
Russia	Elena Grosheva	12 April 1979 (aged 17)	Yaroslavl, Russia
Russia	Svetlana Khorkina	19 January 1979 (aged 17)	Belgorod, Russia
Russia	Dina Kochetkova	27 July 1977 (aged 18)	Moscow, Russia
Russia	Evgeniya Kuznetsova	18 December 1980 (aged 15)	Saint Petersburg, Russia
Russia	Oksana Lyapina	28 April 1980 (aged 16)	Armavir, Russia
Slovakia	Klaudia Kinská	15 June 1978 (aged 18)	Košice, Slovakia
South Korea	Kong Yoon-jin	27 September 1981 (aged 14)	Seoul, South Korea
Spain	Verónica Castro	26 June 1979 (aged 17)	Gijón, Spain
Spain	Joana Juárez	5 August 1980 (aged 15)	Barcelona, Spain
Spain	Mónica Martín	21 June 1976 (aged 20)	Gijón, Spain
Spain	Mercedes Pacheco	29 May 1978 (aged 18)	Madrid, Spain
Spain	Gemma Paz	18 August 1981 (aged 14)	Madrid, Spain
Spain	Diana Plaza	12 June 1981 (aged 15)	Madrid, Spain
Spain	Elisabeth Valle	10 February 1978 (aged 18)	Barcelona, Spain
Switzerland	Pascale Grossenbacher	27 May 1978 (aged 18)	Chavannes, Switzerland
Ukraine	Oksana Knizhnik	3 January 1977 (aged 19)	Kyiv, Ukraine
Ukraine	Anna Mirgorodskaya	13 March 1980 (aged 16)	Odesa, Ukraine
Ukraine	Lilia Podkopayeva	15 August 1978 (aged 17)	Donetsk, Ukraine
Ukraine	Olena Shaparna	4 February 1979 (aged 17)	Kherson, Ukraine
Ukraine	Liubov Sheremeta	17 January 1980 (aged 16)	Lviv, Ukraine
Ukraine	Olha Teslenko	23 May 1981 (aged 15)	Kropyvnytskyi, Ukraine
Ukraine	Svetlana Zelepukina	16 August 1980 (aged 15)	Kropyvnytskyi, Ukraine
United States	Amanda Borden	5 May 1977 (aged 19)	Cincinnati, Ohio
United States	Amy Chow	15 May 1978 (aged 18)	San Jose, California
United States	Dominique Dawes	20 November 1976 (aged 19)	Silver Spring, Maryland
United States	Shannon Miller	10 March 1977 (aged 19)	Rolla, Missouri
United States	Dominique Moceanu	30 September 1981 (aged 14)	Los Angeles, California
United States	Jaycie Phelps	26 September 1979 (aged 16)	Indianapolis, Indiana
United States	Kerri Strug	19 November 1977 (aged 18)	Tucson, Arizona
Uzbekistan	Oksana Chusovitina	19 June 1975 (aged 21)	Bukhara, Uzbekistan
Uzbekistan	Anastasia Dzyundzyak	26 March 1979 (aged 17)	

== Men's artistic gymnastics ==
	Name	Country	Date of birth (Age)
Youngest competitors	Nikolai Kryukov	Russia	11 November 1978 (aged 17)
Oldest competitor	Li Donghua	Switzerland	10 November 1966 (aged 29)

NOC	Name	Date of birth (Age)	Hometown
Argentina	Marcelo Palacio	4 April 1975 (aged 21)	
Armenia	Norayr Sargsyan	25 September 1974 (aged 21)	Parakar, Armenia
Australia	Brennon Dowrick	27 July 1971 (aged 24)	Wagga Wagga, New South Wales
Australia	Bret Hudson	2 October 1973 (aged 22)	Sydney, New South Wales
Barbados	Shane de Freitas	12 September 1977 (aged 18)	Bridgetown, Barbados
Belarus	Aleksandr Belanovsky	3 May 1972 (aged 24)	Minsk, Belarus
Belarus	Andrey Kan	5 November 1971 (aged 24)	Baranavichy, Belarus
Belarus	Ivan Pavlovsky	2 December 1976 (aged 19)	Grodno, Belarus
Belarus	Vitaly Rudnitsky	29 November 1974 (aged 21)	Mogilev, Belarus
Belarus	Vitaly Scherbo	13 January 1972 (aged 24)	Minsk, Belarus
Belarus	Aleksandr Shostak	1 March 1974 (aged 22)	Minsk, Belarus
Belarus	Aleksey Sinkevich	10 June 1977 (aged 19)	Vitebsk, Belarus
Bulgaria	Krasimir Dunev	11 September 1972 (aged 23)	Plovdiv, Bulgaria
Bulgaria	Kalofer Hristozov	19 March 1969 (aged 27)	Plovdiv, Bulgaria
Bulgaria	Ivan Ivanov	26 September 1974 (aged 21)	Varna, Bulgaria
Bulgaria	Dimitar Lunchev	22 June 1977 (aged 19)	Ruse, Bulgaria
Bulgaria	Vasil Vetsev	21 January 1974 (aged 22)	Sofia, Bulgaria
Bulgaria	Deyan Yordanov	21 July 1976 (aged 19)	Ruse, Bulgaria
Bulgaria	Yordan Yovchev	24 February 1973 (aged 23)	Plovdiv, Bulgaria
Canada	Kris Burley	29 January 1974 (aged 22)	Truro, Nova Scotia
Canada	Richard Ikeda	26 November 1974 (aged 21)	Kamloops, British Columbia
Canada	Alan Nolet	17 December 1967 (aged 28)	Toronto, Ontario
China	Fan Bin	30 May 1974 (aged 22)	Pingdingshan, Henan
China	Fan Hongbin	13 May 1975 (aged 21)	Zhuozhou, Hebei
China	Huang Huadong	2 January 1972 (aged 24)	
China	Huang Liping	9 April 1973 (aged 23)	Wuhan, Hubei
China	Li Xiaoshuang	1 November 1973 (aged 22)	Xiantao, Hubei
China	Shen Jian	14 May 1975 (aged 21)	Xintai, Shandong
China	Zhang Jinjing	1 November 1977 (aged 18)	
Croatia	Aleksej Demjanov	9 December 1973 (aged 22)	Cherkessk, Russia
Czech Republic	Jiří Fiřt	1 August 1972 (aged 23)	Prague, Czech Republic
France	Thiérry Aymes	15 October 1973 (aged 22)	Ollioules, France
France	Patrice Casimir	4 July 1972 (aged 24)	Saint-Pierre, Réunion
France	Sébastien Darrigade	20 March 1972 (aged 24)	Saint-Mandé, France
France	Frédéric Lemoine	13 March 1970 (aged 26)	Pantin, France
France	Frédérick Nicolas	19 November 1974 (aged 21)	La Tronche, France
France	Éric Poujade	8 August 1972 (aged 23)	Aix-en-Provence, France
France	Sébastien Tayac	4 December 1975 (aged 20)	Nice, France
Georgia	Ilia Giorgadze	12 January 1978 (aged 18)	Kutaisi, Georgia
Germany	Valery Belenky	5 September 1969 (aged 26)	Baku, Azerbaijan
Germany	Uwe Billerbeck	28 May 1970 (aged 26)	Esslingen am Neckar, Germany
Germany	Jan-Peter Nikiferow	8 November 1971 (aged 24)	Magdeburg, Germany
Germany	Karsten Oelsch	13 April 1971 (aged 25)	Erlabrunn, Germany
Germany	Marius Tobă	9 January 1968 (aged 28)	Reșița, Romania
Germany	Oliver Walther	28 October 1972 (aged 23)	Halle, Germany
Germany	Andreas Wecker	2 January 1970 (aged 26)	Staßfurt, Germany
Great Britain	Dominic Brindle	30 June 1976 (aged 20)	Bradford, England
Great Britain	Lee McDermott	11 February 1974 (aged 22)	London, England
Greece	Ioannis Melissanidis	27 March 1977 (aged 19)	Dachau, Germany
Hungary	Szilveszter Csollány	13 April 1970 (aged 26)	Sopron, Hungary
Hungary	Krisztián Jordanov	15 April 1976 (aged 20)	Sofia, Bulgaria
Hungary	Zoltán Supola	25 September 1970 (aged 25)	Dunaújváros, Hungary
Iceland	Rúnar Alexandersson	28 March 1977 (aged 19)	Smolensk, Russia
Ireland	Barry McDonald	17 September 1971 (aged 24)	
Italy	Marcello Barbieri	13 February 1971 (aged 25)	Modena, Italy
Italy	Paolo Bucci	23 July 1968 (aged 27)	Milan, Italy
Italy	Jury Chechi	11 October 1969 (aged 26)	Prato, Italy
Italy	Francesco Colombo	22 June 1973 (aged 23)	Carate Brianza, Italy
Italy	Roberto Galli	26 April 1973 (aged 23)	Gallarate, Italy
Italy	Sergio Luini	12 November 1972 (aged 23)	Busto Arsizio, Italy
Italy	Boris Preti	6 February 1968 (aged 28)	Gallarate, Italy
Japan	Yoshiaki Hatakeda	12 May 1972 (aged 24)	Tokushima Prefecture, Japan
Japan	Shigeru Kurihara	7 April 1970 (aged 26)	Saitama Prefecture, Japan
Japan	Toshiharu Sato	19 March 1969 (aged 27)	Osaka, Japan
Japan	Hikaru Tanaka	19 July 1972 (aged 24)	Tanabe, Japan
Japan	Naoya Tsukahara	25 June 1977 (aged 19)	Nagasaki, Japan
Japan	Takashi Uchiyama	18 August 1974 (aged 21)	Saitama Prefecture, Japan
Kazakhstan	Aleksey Dmitriyenko	4 December 1976 (aged 19)	
Kazakhstan	Sergey Fedorchenko	18 September 1974 (aged 21)	Almaty, Kazakhstan
North Korea	Pae Gil-su	4 March 1972 (aged 24)	
Norway	Flemming Solberg	20 August 1973 (aged 22)	Drammen, Norway
Puerto Rico	Diego Lizardi	9 October 1975 (aged 20)	San Juan, Puerto Rico
Romania	Dan Burincă	17 June 1972 (aged 24)	Sibiu, Romania
Romania	Adrian Ianculescu	28 October 1973 (aged 22)	Lugoj, Romania
Romania	Cristian Leric	27 June 1974 (aged 22)	Arad, Romania
Romania	Nistor Șandro	17 September 1974 (aged 21)	Oradea, Romania
Romania	Nicu Stroia	20 October 1971 (aged 24)	Pângărați, Romania
Romania	Robert Tăciulet	8 February 1972 (aged 24)	Buzău, Romania
Romania	Marius Urzică	30 September 1975 (aged 20)	Toplița, Romania
Russia	Sergei Kharkov	17 November 1970 (aged 25)	Moscow, Russia
Russia	Nikolai Kryukov	11 November 1978 (aged 17)	Voronezh, Russia
Russia	Aleksei Nemov	28 May 1976 (aged 20)	Barashevo, Russia
Russia	Yevgeni Podgorny	9 July 1977 (aged 19)	Novosibirsk, Russia
Russia	Dmitri Trush	8 February 1973 (aged 23)	Seversk, Russia
Russia	Dmitri Vasilenko	12 November 1975 (aged 20)	Cherkessk, Russia
Russia	Aleksei Voropayev	23 January 1973 (aged 23)	Moscow, Russia
South Korea	Han Yun-su	8 February 1973 (aged 23)	Suwon, South Korea
South Korea	Jeong Jin-su	15 August 1972 (aged 23)	
South Korea	Jo Seong-min	5 January 1976 (aged 20)	Jeollabuk, South Korea
South Korea	Kim Bong-hyeon	11 May 1975 (aged 21)	
South Korea	Kim Dong-hwa	21 March 1976 (aged 20)	Masan, South Korea
South Korea	Lee Joo-hyung	5 March 1973 (aged 23)	
South Korea	Yeo Hong-chul	28 May 1971 (aged 25)	Gwangju, South Korea
Spain	Jesús Carballo	26 November 1976 (aged 19)	Madrid, Spain
Switzerland	Michael Engeler	18 June 1971 (aged 25)	St. Gallen, Switzerland
Switzerland	Li Donghua	10 November 1966 (aged 29)	Chengdu, China
Switzerland	Erich Wanner	5 April 1969 (aged 27)	
Ukraine	Ihor Korobchynskyi	16 August 1969 (aged 26)	Antratsyt, Ukraine
Ukraine	Oleg Kosyak	26 November 1975 (aged 20)	Kyiv, Ukraine
Ukraine	Grigoriy Misyutin	29 December 1970 (aged 25)	Oleksandriia, Ukraine
Ukraine	Volodymyr Shamenko	8 August 1972 (aged 23)	Taraz, Kazakhstan
Ukraine	Rustam Sharipov	2 June 1971 (aged 25)	Dushanbe, Tajikistan
Ukraine	Oleksandr Svitlychniy	23 August 1972 (aged 23)	Kharkiv, Ukraine
Ukraine	Yuriy Yermakov	3 September 1970 (aged 25)	Makiivka, Ukraine
United States	Mihal Bagiu	10 April 1971 (aged 25)	Timișoara, Romania
United States	Jair Lynch	2 October 1971 (aged 24)	Amherst, Massachusetts
United States	John Macready	29 April 1975 (aged 21)	Los Angeles, California
United States	John Roethlisberger	21 June 1970 (aged 26)	Fort Atkinson, Wisconsin
United States	Kip Simons	11 September 1972 (aged 23)	Media, Pennsylvania
United States	Chainey Umphrey	2 August 1970 (aged 25)	Albuquerque, New Mexico
United States	Blaine Wilson	3 August 1974 (aged 21)	Columbus, Ohio

== Rhythmic gymnasts ==
=== Individual ===
	Name	Country	Date of birth (Age)
Youngest competitor	Almudena Cid	Spain	15 June 1980 (aged 16)
Oldest competitor	Lenka Oulehlová	Czech Republic	14 June 1973 (aged 23)

NOC	Name	Date of birth (age)	Hometown
Austria	Birgit Schielin	22 March 1979 (aged 17)	Vienna, Austria
Austria	Nina Taborsky	28 April 1978 (aged 18)	Vienna, Austria
Belarus	Larisa Lukyanenko	7 August 1973 (aged 22)	Krasnoyarsk, Russia
Belarus	Tatiana Ogrizko	28 May 1976 (aged 20)	Minsk, Belarus
Belgium	Cindy Stollenberg	22 July 1976 (aged 19)	Verviers, Belgium
Bulgaria	Maria Petrova	13 November 1975 (aged 20)	Plovdiv, Bulgaria
Bulgaria	Diana Popova	10 December 1976 (aged 19)	Plovdiv, Bulgaria
Canada	Camille Martens	1 June 1976 (aged 20)	Vancouver, British Columbia
China	Wu Bei	22 December 1979 (aged 16)	
China	Zhou Xiaojing	10 August 1977 (aged 18)	Rui'an, Zhejiang
Czech Republic	Lenka Oulehlová	14 June 1973 (aged 23)	Brno, Czech Republic
Czech Republic	Andrea Šebestová	16 March 1978 (aged 18)	Plzeň, Czech Republic
Finland	Katri Kalpala	29 September 1976 (aged 19)	Helsinki, Finland
France	Eva Serrano	24 April 1978 (aged 18)	Nîmes, France
Georgia	Ekaterina Abramia	25 August 1979 (aged 16)	Tbilisi, Georgia
Germany	Magdalena Brzeska	14 May 1978 (aged 18)	Gdynia, Poland
Germany	Kristin Sroka	23 May 1977 (aged 19)	Leipzig, Germany
Greece	Maria Pangalou	28 April 1979 (aged 17)	Thessaloniki, Greece
Greece	Evangelia Sotiriou	2 March 1980 (aged 16)	Athens, Greece
Hungary	Viktória Fráter	30 August 1977 (aged 18)	Budapest, Hungary
Hungary	Andrea Szalay	20 May 1976 (aged 20)	Budapest, Hungary
Italy	Irene Germini	24 July 1974 (aged 21)	Legnano, Italy
Italy	Katia Pietrosanti	22 June 1979 (aged 17)	Como, Italy
Japan	Miho Yamada	21 June 1973 (aged 23)	Chofu, Japan
Japan	Akane Yamao	30 September 1974 (aged 21)	Kiyose, Japan
Lithuania	Kristina Kliukevičiūtė	10 July 1975 (aged 21)	Kaunas, Lithuania
Poland	Anna Kwitniewska	14 March 1979 (aged 17)	Gdynia, Poland
Poland	Krystyna Leśkiewicz	27 July 1974 (aged 21)	Wrocław, Poland
Romania	Dana Carteleanu	18 December 1979 (aged 16)	
Romania	Alina Stoica	18 January 1979 (aged 17)	Baia Mare, Romania
Russia	Yanina Batyrchina	7 October 1979 (aged 16)	Tashkent, Uzbekistan
Russia	Amina Zaripova	10 August 1976 (aged 19)	Chirchiq, Uzbekistan
Spain	Alba Caride	24 April 1980 (aged 16)	Vigo, Spain
Spain	Almudena Cid	15 June 1980 (aged 16)	Vitoria-Gasteiz, Spain
Ukraine	Ekaterina Serebrianska	25 October 1977 (aged 18)	Simferopol, Ukraine
Ukraine	Olena Vitrychenko	25 November 1976 (aged 19)	Odesa, Ukraine
United States	Jessica Davis	10 April 1978 (aged 18)	Greenbrae, California

=== Group ===
	Name	Country	Date of birth (Age)
Youngest competitor	Anne Jung	Germany	21 August 1981 (aged 14)
Oldest competitor	Zheng Ni	China	6 July 1976 (aged 20)

NOC	Name	Date of birth (Age)	Hometown
Belarus	Natalia Budilo	8 August 1979 (aged 16)	Minsk, Belarus
Belarus	Olga Demskaya	30 September 1978 (aged 17)	Minsk, Belarus
Belarus	Oksana Zhdanovich	2 December 1977 (aged 18)	Minsk, Belarus
Belarus	Svetlana Luzanova	29 June 1977 (aged 19)	Minsk, Belarus
Belarus	Galina Malashenka	1 March 1980 (aged 16)	Minsk, Belarus
Belarus	Alesia Pokhodina	4 October 1979 (aged 16)	Minsk, Belarus
Bulgaria	Ina Deltcheva	20 July 1977 (aged 18)	Plovdiv, Bulgaria
Bulgaria	Valentina Kevliyan	11 March 1978 (aged 18)	Plovdiv, Bulgaria
Bulgaria	Maria Koleva	10 August 1977 (aged 18)	Sofia, Bulgaria
Bulgaria	Maja Tabakova	11 May 1978 (aged 18)	Sofia, Bulgaria
Bulgaria	Ivelina Taleva	25 March 1977 (aged 19)	Plovdiv, Bulgaria
Bulgaria	Vyara Vatashka	20 February 1980 (aged 16)	Sofia, Bulgaria
China	Cai Yingying	7 December 1978 (aged 17)	
China	Huang Ting	2 July 1977 (aged 19)	
China	Huang Ying	2 July 1977 (aged 19)	
China	Zheng Ni	6 July 1976 (aged 20)	
China	Zhong Li	5 January 1977 (aged 19)	
France	Charlotte Camboulives	26 April 1980 (aged 16)	Calais, France
France	Caroline Chimot	22 April 1978 (aged 18)	Seclin, France
France	Sylvie Didone	31 August 1979 (aged 16)	Vénissieux, France
France	Audrey Grosclaude	29 September 1980 (aged 15)	Tassin-la-Demi-Lune, France
France	Frédérique Léhon	29 October 1980 (aged 15)	Boulogne-sur-Mer, France
France	Nadia Mimoun	28 December 1978 (aged 17)	Montpellier, France
Germany	Nicole Bittner	9 July 1977 (aged 19)	Bernburg, Germany
Germany	Katrin Hoffmann	5 July 1978 (aged 18)	Bad Cannstatt, Germany
Germany	Anne Jung	21 August 1981 (aged 14)	Groß-Umstadt, Germany
Germany	Dörte Schiltz	21 December 1976 (aged 19)	Lüdenscheid, Germany
Germany	Luise Stäblein	15 September 1980 (aged 15)	Berlin, Germany
Germany	Katharina Wildermut	17 April 1979 (aged 17)	Halle, Germany
Italy	Manuela Bocchini	26 July 1980 (aged 15)	Fano, Italy
Italy	Valentina Marino	5 October 1977 (aged 18)	Syracuse, Sicily
Italy	Sara Papi	5 August 1980 (aged 15)	Urbino, Italy
Italy	Sara Pinciroli	1 October 1980 (aged 15)	Busto Arsizio, Italy
Italy	Valentina Rovetta	24 July 1980 (aged 15)	Bergamo, Italy
Italy	Nicoletta Tinti	22 May 1979 (aged 17)	Arezzo, Italy
Russia	Yevgeniya Bochkaryova	10 June 1980 (aged 16)	Penza, Russia
Russia	Irina Dzyuba	16 December 1980 (aged 15)	Novosibirsk, Russia
Russia	Yuliya Ivanova	5 December 1977 (aged 18)	Volgograd, Russia
Russia	Yelena Krivoshey	1 February 1977 (aged 19)	Volgograd, Russia
Russia	Olga Shtyrenko	6 July 1977 (aged 19)	Volgograd, Russia
Russia	Angelina Yushkova	13 November 1979 (aged 16)	Voronezh, Russia
Spain	Marta Baldó	8 April 1979 (aged 17)	Villajoyosa, Spain
Spain	Núria Cabanillas	9 August 1980 (aged 15)	Barcelona, Spain
Spain	Estela Giménez	29 March 1979 (aged 17)	Madrid, Spain
Spain	Lorena Guréndez	7 May 1981 (aged 15)	Vitoria-Gasteiz, Spain
Spain	Tania Lamarca	30 April 1980 (aged 16)	Vitoria-Gasteiz, Spain
Spain	Estíbaliz Martínez	9 May 1980 (aged 16)	Vitoria-Gasteiz, Spain
United States	Mandy James	9 December 1978 (aged 17)	Jacksonville, Florida
United States	Aliane Mata-Baquerot	23 November 1978 (aged 17)	New York, New York
United States	Kate Nelson	27 December 1977 (aged 18)	Evanston, Illinois
United States	Brandi Siegel	4 August 1979 (aged 16)	Miami, Florida
United States	Challen Sievers	19 April 1979 (aged 17)	Downers Grove, Illinois
United States	Becky Turner	17 September 1977 (aged 18)	Marietta, Georgia
