= Gymnastics at the 1996 Summer Olympics – Women's rhythmic qualification =

Gymnastics at the Games of the XXVI Olympiad
- Venue: Georgia Dome (artistic); Stegeman Coliseum (rhythmic)
- Dates: 20 July – 4 August 1996

Ten individual competitors and six national teams qualified for the women's rhythmic gymnastics events at the 1996 Summer Olympics.

== Individual all-around qualification ==
=== Final qualifiers ===
Gymnast	Gymnast	Gymnast	Gymnast	Gymnast
Larisa Lukyanenko; Belarus Qualification: 4 Semi-final: 5	Tatiana Ogrizko; Belarus Qualification: 9 Semi-final: 6	Maria Petrova; Bulgaria Qualification: 6 Semi-final: 4	Eva Serrano; France Qualification: 7 Semi-final: 8	Magdalena Brzeska; Germany Qualification: 15; Semi-final: 10
Yanina Batyrchina; Russia Qualification: 13; Semi-final: 3	Amina Zaripova; Russia Qualification: 3 Semi-final: 7	Almudena Cid; Spain Qualification: 5 Semi-final: 9	Ekaterina Serebrianskaya; Ukraine Qualification: 2 Semi-final: 1	Elena Vitrichenko; Ukraine Qualification: 1 Semi-final: 2

=== Preliminaries ===
In total, 37 gymnasts from 22 countries competed in the qualification round. The top 20 gymnasts advanced to the semifinal.

Preliminaries results

Rank	Gymnast	Nation	Rope (rhythmic gymnastics)	Ball (rhythmic gymnastics)	Clubs (rhythmic gymnastics)	Ribbon (rhythmic gymnastics)	Total	Qual.
1	Elena Vitrichenko	Ukraine	9.800 (2)	9.800 (1)	9.800 (=2)	9.800 (1)	39.200	Q
2	Ekaterina Serebrianskaya	Ukraine	9.799 (3)	9.783 (2)	9.832 (1)	9.699 (5)	39.113	Q
3	Amina Zaripova	Russia	9.716 (4)	9.699 (4)	9.583 (7)	9.750 (2)	38.748	Q
4	Larisa Lukyanenko	Belarus	9.699 (5)	9.366 (=15)	9.716 (5)	9.700 (4)	38.481	Q
5	Almudena Cid	Spain	9.600 (7)	9.600 (=5)	9.600 (6)	9.600 (7)	38.400	Q
6	Maria Petrova	Bulgaria	9.666 (6)	9.183 (=24)	9.800 (=2)	9.733 (3)	38.383	Q
7	Eva Serrano	France	9.516 (10)	9.600 (=5)	9.466 (13)	9.566 (9)	38.148	Q
8	Maria Pangalou	Greece	9.500 (11)	9.500 (=7)	9.533 (=8)	9.450 (11)	37.983	Q
9	Tatiana Ogrizko	Belarus	8.766 (37)	9.750 (3)	9.750 (4)	9.633 (6)	37.899	Q
10	Diana Popova	Bulgaria	9.550 (9)	9.500 (=7)	9.516 (11)	9.283 (=18)	37.849	Q
=11	Alba Caride	Spain	9.416 (14)	9.433 (12)	9.532 (10)	9.400 (=13)	37.781	Q
=11	Alina Stoica	Romania	9.316 (19)	9.499 (9)	9.500 (12)	9.466 (10)	37.781	Q
13	Yanina Batyrchina	Russia	9.816 (1)	9.266 (=18)	9.350 (17)	9.316 (17)	37.748	Q
14	Kristin Sroka	Germany	9.432 (13)	9.450 (11)	9.399 (15)	9.416 (12)	37.697	Q
15	Magdalena Brzeska	Germany	9.566 (8)	8.933 (33)	9.533 (=8)	9.583 (8)	37.616	Q
16	Zhou Xiaojing	China	9.333 (=17)	9.416 (13)	9.416 (14)	9.383 (15)	37.549	Q
17	Irene Germini	Italy	9.466 (12)	9.466 (10)	9.216 (=28)	9.400 (=13)	37.548	Q
18	Miho Yamada	Japan	9.350 (16)	9.350 (17)	9.249 (=26)	9.182 (27)	37.131	Q
19	Akane Yamao	Japan	9.183 (29)	9.366 (=15)	9.283 (22)	9.283 (=18)	37.116	Q
20	Katia Pietrosanti	Italy	8.983 (36)	9.400 (14)	9.366 (16)	9.350 (16)	37.099	Q
21	Krystyna Leskiewicz	Poland	9.250 (20)	9.232 (22)	9.250 (25)	9.250 (20)	36.982	-
22	Lenka Oulehlová	Czech Republic	9.232 (24)	9.266 (=18)	9.266 (=23)	9.199 (26)	36.963	-
23	Viktória Fráter	Hungary	9.233 (=21)	9.116 (30)	9.333 (19)	9.249 (=21)	36.932	-
24	Birgit Schielin	Austria	9.200 (=26)	9.166 (=27)	9.266 (=23)	9.249 (=21)	36.881	-
25	Ekaterina Abramia	Georgia	9.200 (=26)	9.250 (20)	9.183 (30)	9.200 (=23)	36.833	-
26	Evangelia Sotiriou	Greece	9.233 (=21)	9.183 (=24)	9.299 (21)	8.983 (34)	36.699	-
27	Anna Kwitniewska	Poland	9.233 (=21)	8.932 (34)	9.349 (18)	9.166 (=28)	36.680	-
28	Andrea Šebestová	Czech Republic	9.366 (15)	8.783 (36)	9.249 (=26)	9.200 (=23)	36.598	-
29	Nina Taborsky	Austria	9.133 (33)	9.183 (=24)	9.083 (33)	9.166 (=28)	36.566	-
30	Jessica Davis	United States	9.166 (31)	9.200 (23)	9.216 (=28)	8.982 (35)	36.564	-
31	Cindy Stollenberg	Belgium	9.033 (34)	9.166 (=27)	9.149 (32)	9.116 (=30)	36.464	-
32	Dana Carteleanu	Romania	9.150 (32)	9.166 (=27)	9.050 (34)	9.016 (33)	36.382	-
33	Camille Martens	Canada	9.333 (=17)	8.599 (37)	9.316 (20)	9.116 (=30)	36.364	-
34	Katri Kalpala	Finland	9.182 (30)	8.800 (35)	9.166 (31)	9.200 (=23)	36.348	-
35	Wu Bei	China	9.216 (25)	9.249 (21)	8.933 (35)	8.899 (37)	36.297	-
36	Andrea Szalay	Hungary	9.000 (35)	9.033 (31)	8.883 (36)	8.982 (36)	35.899	-
37	Kristina Kliukevičiūtė	Lithuania	9.199 (28)	8.966 (32)	8.499 (37)	9.083 (32)	35.747	-
-	Lina-Mohamed Monir	Egypt	-	-	-	-	-	DNS
-	Kasumi Takahashi	Australia	-	-	-	-	-	DNS

=== Semi-finals ===
20 gymnasts from 12 countries competed in the semifinal round. The 10 highest scoring gymnasts advanced to the final.

Semi-final Results

Rank	Gymnast	Nation	Rope (rhythmic gymnastics)	Ball (rhythmic gymnastics)	Clubs (rhythmic gymnastics)	Ribbon (rhythmic gymnastics)	Total	Qual.
1	Ekaterina Serebrianskaya	Ukraine	9.916 (1)	9.933 (1)	9.583 (8)	9.900 (1)	39.333	Q
2	Elena Vitrichenko	Ukraine	9.750 (3)	9.900 (2)	9.750 (2)	9.866 (2)	39.266	Q
3	Yanina Batyrchina	Russia	9.850 (2)	9.866 (3)	9.733 (=3)	9.783 (3)	39.233	Q
4	Maria Petrova	Bulgaria	9.716 (=4)	9.750 (=5)	9.733 (=3)	9.700 (4)	38.899	Q
5	Larisa Lukyanenko	Belarus	9.700 (6)	9.750 (=5)	9.616 (=6)	9.683 (=5)	38.749	Q
6	Tatiana Ogrizko	Belarus	9.633 (8)	9.682 (9)	9.700 (5)	9.666 (7)	38.681	Q
7	Amina Zaripova	Russia	9.716 (=4)	9.850 (4)	9.782 (1)	9.316 (18)	38.664	Q
8	Eva Serrano	France	9.666 (7)	9.700 (=7)	9.566 (9)	9.683 (=5)	38.615	Q
9	Almudena Cid	Spain	9.583 (9)	9.700 (=7)	9.616 (=6)	9.549 (9)	38.448	Q
10	Magdalena Brzeska	Germany	9.550 (10)	9.583 (10)	9.516 (10)	9.583 (8)	38.233	Q
11	Diana Popova	Bulgaria	9.449 (13)	9.466 (15)	9.466 (11)	9.449 (13)	37.830	-
12	Maria Pangalou	Greece	9.516 (11)	9.500 (=13)	9.333 (12)	9.466 (=11)	37.815	-
13	Irene Germini	Italy	9.266 (17)	9.500 (=13)	9.250 (=13)	9.500 (10)	37.516	-
14	Katia Pietrosanti	Italy	9.366 (14)	9.366 (17)	9.250 (=13)	9.333 (17)	37.315	-
15	Alina Stoica	Romania	9.483 (12)	9.533 (12)	8.766 (20)	9.466 (=11)	37.249	-
16	Kristin Sroka	Germany	9.283 (16)	9.550 (11)	8.900 (19)	9.400 (=14)	37.133	-
17	Zhou Xiaojing	China	9.200 (19)	9.266 (18)	9.250 (=13)	9.400 (=14)	37.116	-
18	Akane Yamao	Japan	9.233 (18)	8.966 (20)	9.216 (16)	9.383 (16)	36.799	-
19	Alba Caride	Spain	9.049 (20)	9.449 (16)	8.933 (18)	9.266 (19)	36.697	-
20	Miho Yamada	Japan	9.316 (15)	9.133 (19)	9.200 (17)	8.616 (20)	36.265	-

== Group all-around qualification ==
=== Final qualifiers ===
Team	Team	Team	Team	Team	Team
Belarus; Natalia Boudilo; Olga Demskaia; Oxana Jdanovitch; Svetlana Louzanova; Halina Malashenka; Alesia Pokhodina	Bulgaria; Ina Deltcheva; Valentina Kevlian; Maria Koleva; Maja Tabakova; Ivelina Taleva; Vjara Vatachka	China; Cai Yingying; Huang Ting; Huang Ying; Zheng Ni; Zhong Li	France; Charlotte Camboulives; Caroline Chimot; Sylvie Didone; Audrey Grosclaude; Frédérique Léhon; Nadia Mimoun	Russia; Yevgeniya Bochkaryova; Irina Dzyuba; Yuliya Ivanova; Yelena Krivoshey; Olga Shtyrenko; Angelina Yushkova	Spain; Marta Baldó; Núria Cabanillas; Estela Giménez; Lorena Guréndez; Tania Lamarca; Estíbaliz Martínez
Preliminaries: 4	Preliminaries: 1	Preliminaries: 6	Preliminaries: 5	Preliminaries: 3	Preliminaries: 2

=== Team rosters ===
Team rosters

Team	Team	Team	Team	Team	Team
Belarus; Natalia Boudilo; Olga Demskaia; Oxana Jdanovitch; Svetlana Louzanova; Galina Malachenko; Alesija Pohodina	Bulgaria; Ina Deltcheva; Valentina Kevlian; Maria Koleva; Maja Tabakova; Ivelina Taleva; Viara Vatashka	China; Cai Yingying; Huang Ting; Huang Ying; Zheng Ni; Zhong Li	France; Charlotte Camboulives; Caroline Chimot; Sylvie Didone; Audrey Grosclaude; Frédérique Léhon; Nadia Mimoun	Germany; Nicole Bittner; Katrin Hoffmann; Anne Jung; Dörte Schiltz; Luise Stablein; Katharina Wildermuth	Italy; Manuela Bocchini; Valentina Marino; Sara Papi; Sara Pinciroli; Valentina Rovetta; Nicoletta Tinti
Russia; Yevgeniya Bochkaryova; Irina Dzyuba; Yuliya Ivanova; Yelena Krivoshey; Olga Shtyrenko; Angelina Yushkova	Spain; Marta Baldó; Nuria Cabanillas; Estela Giménez; Lorena Guréndez; Tania Lamarca; Estíbaliz Martínez	United States; Mandy James; Aliane Mata-Baquerot; Kate Nelson; Brandi Siegel; Challen Sievers; Becky Turner			

=== Preliminaries ===
Nine teams participated in the preliminary round; the top six teams advanced to the final.

Preliminaries results

Rank	Team	5	3 + 2	Total	Qual.
1	Bulgaria	19.466 (3)	19.550 (1)	39.016	Q
2	Spain	19.500 (2)	19.466 (2)	38.966	Q
3	Russia	19.516 (1)	19.366 (3)	38.882	Q
4	Belarus	19.300 (4)	19.133 (4)	38.433	Q
5	France	19.200 (6)	19.033 (5)	38.233	Q
6	China	19.133 (7)	18.999 (6)	38.132	Q
7	Italy	19.283 (5)	18.733 (8)	38.016	-
8	Germany	19.050 (8)	18.832 (7)	37.882	-
9	United States	18.400 (9)	18.233 (9)	36.633	-

== See also ==
- Gymnastics at the 1996 Summer Olympics – Women's rhythmic individual all-around
- Gymnastics at the 1996 Summer Olympics – Women's rhythmic group all-around
