= 1997 World Rhythmic Gymnastics Championships =

- Location: Berlin, Germany
- Start date: 23 October 1997
- End date: 26 October 1997

XXI World Rhythmic Gymnastics Championships were held in Berlin, Germany on 23–26 October, 1997.

159 gymnasts from 50 countries competed. Reigning World champion Kateryna Serebrianska did not compete. The reason given for this was that her mother, who was also her coach, had fallen seriously ill with a heart condition, though Sovetsky Sport ran an article claiming that it was because her mother was not chosen to be a judge at the competition. Instead, Olena Vitrychenko's mother was selected.

Vitrychenko was second in the preliminary round to Natalia Lipkovskaya but went on to win the competition in the final, earning perfect 10 scores for two of her routines. She also won three of the event finals. Lipkovskaya won the silver medal and medaled in all four apparatus finals, including winning hoop. The bronze medalist was Yana Batyrshina, who tied Vitrychenko for gold on rope and also won silver with clubs. Eva Serrano won two bronze medals in the event finals, and Tatiana Popova tied Lipkovskaya for bronze with clubs.

== Medal winners ==
Event	Gold	Silver	Bronze
All-around Finals
Team	Russia; Yana Batyrshina; Natalia Lipkovskaya; Amina Zaripova	Belarus; Evgenia Pavlina; Yulia Raskina; Valeria Vatkina	Ukraine; Olena Vitrychenko; Tamara Yerofeeva; Tatiana Popova
Individual	Olena Vitrychenko; Ukraine	Natalia Lipkovskaya; Russia	Yana Batyrshina; Russia
Apparatus Finals
Rope	Olena Vitrychenko; Ukraine; Yana Batyrshina; Russia	None awarded	Natalia Lipkovskaya; Russia
Hoop	Natalia Lipkovskaya; Russia	Olena Vitrychenko; Ukraine	Eva Serrano; France
Clubs	Olena Vitrychenko; Ukraine	Yana Batyrshina; Russia	Natalia Lipkovskaya; Russia; Tatiana Popova; Ukraine
Ribbon	Olena Vitrychenko; Ukraine	Natalia Lipkovskaya; Russia	Eva Serrano; France

== Participants ==
The following countries sent competitors: Argentina, Armenia, Australia, Austria, Azerbaijan, Belgium, Belarus, Brazil, Bulgaria, Canada, China, Croatia, Cuba, Cyprus, Czech Republic, Estonia, Finland, France, Georgia, Germany, Greece, Hungary, Israel, Italy, Japan, Kazakhstan, Kyrgyzstan, Latvia, Lithuania, Malaysia, Mexico, The Netherlands, New Zealand, Norway, Poland, Portugal, Romania, Russia, Slovakia, Slovenia, South Africa, South Korea, Spain, Thailand, Turkey, Ukraine, The United Kingdom, USA, Uzbekistan and Yugoslavia.

=== Individual entrants ===
- Argentina: Lorena Garroco, Roxana Marion, Sandra Re, Anahi Sosa
- Armenia: Nina Aloian, Narine Davoyan, Lusine Galstyan, Karine Kachatrian
- Australia: Shaneez Johnston, Danielle Le Ray, Leigh Marning, Kristy Darrah
- Austria: Alexandra Baer, Valerie Hackl, Birgit Schielin
- Azerbaijan: Alfia Kukshinova, Alieva Nourdjachan, Irina Pavlichenco, Sabina Tagiev
- Belarus: Tatiana Ogrizko, Evgenia Pavlina, Yulia Raskina, Valeria Vatkina
- Belgium: Astrid de Mul, Frederique Donnay, Cecile Maissin
- Brazil: Kizzy Antualpa, Dayane Camilo da Silva, Camila Ferezin, Elise Penedo
- Bulgaria: Teodora Alexandrova, Boryana Gineva, Viktoria Danova
- Canada: Julia Lombara, Jodie Miller, Erika-Leigh Stirton
- China: Yunfei Pu, Xi Zhang, Bei Wu, Xiaojing Zhou
- Croatia: Kristina Bajaz, Petra Jurinec, Zrinka Uzbinec, Tanja Balazic
- Cuba: Yamile Sotolongo, Yordania Corrales, Yasleidy Rodriguez
- Cyprus: Angela Georgiou, Maria Kyprianidou, Chrtalla Panayiotou, Elena Theodorou
- Czech Republic: Lucie Barkova, Renata Hostinska, Kamila Krynicka, Andrea Šebestová
- Estonia: Natalja Kornysheva, Ege Soidla, Irina Stadnik, Julia Tsvetajeva
- Finland: Heini Lautala, Heidi Niemi, Minna Markkanen, Laura Pietilainen
- France: Eva Serrano, Stephanie Delayat, Caroline Stepanoff, Amelie Villeneuve
- (Georgia (country)) Georgia: Vanda Kereselidze, Inga Tavdishvili
- Germany: Magdalena Brzeska, Edita Schaufler, Monique Strobl, Helene Asmus
- Greece: Sophia Bakola, Maria Pagalou, Irene Polydorou, Georgia Straka
- Hungary: Viktoria Frater, Orsolya Balogh, Dora Toth, Katalin Kiss
- Israel: Lital Baumwell, Svetlana Tokayev, Ania Shabsis, Dana Sulema
- Italy: Susanna Marchesi, Martina Nadalini, Arianna Rusca, Laura Zacchilli
- Japan: Mikako Iwamoto, Rieko Matsunaga, Kayako Miyazaki, Yukari Murata
- Kazakhstan: Elena Rogojina, Yulia Yourtchenko, Valeria Khairoulina
- Kyrgyzstan: Saule Tlebaldinova
- Latvia: Lioubov Hohloya, Darya Medyouho, Ina Proyouma, Ana Zelenska
- Lithuania: Anzelika Filipovic, Kristina Kliukevičiūtė, Natalija Filistovic, Živilė Rezgytė
- Malaysia: Carolyn Au Yong, Farah Zellinah Kemal, Sarina Sundarajah, Chee Kiat Thye
- Mexico: Silvia Palacios, Marcela Salinas, Laura Escalante, Karenia Gutierrez
- The Netherlands: Sabina Hoogendijk, Lucinda Schuurman, Ramona Stook
- New Zealand: Felicity Gould-Thorpe, Gemma Railton, Simone Clark
- Norway: Marianne Haugli, Siri Kjeksrud
- Poland: Krystyna Leśkiewicz, Joanna Bobrucka, Agnieszka Brandebura, Anna Kwitniewska
- Portugal: Ines Honorio, Susana Nascimento, Vanessa Pereira, Joana Raposo
- Romania: Evelina Benchea, Dilana Ferencz, Dana Carteleanu, Alina Stoica
- Russia: Yana Batyrshina, Natalia Lipkovskaya, Amina Zaripova
- Slovakia: Zuzana Dobiasova, Eva Filcova, Eleonora Korcekova, Ivana Morolikova
- Slovenia: Anja Cucek, Dusica Jeremic, Ana Rebov, Nina Vengust
- South Africa: Andrea Schermoly, Michelle Cameron, Brigitte Heeb, Cheryl Phillips
- South Korea: Hwang Sook-Hyun, Kim Eun-Hae, Kim Min-Jung, Kwon Bo-Young
- Spain: Almudena Cid, Alba Caride Costas, Esther Dominguez, Carolina Malchair
- Thailand: Aunchaya Yeansukon
- Turkey: Misra Gigeroglu
- Ukraine: Tamara Erofeeva, Elena Vitrichenko, Tatiana Popova
- The United Kingdom: Debbie McLarnon, Annabel Brown, Laura Mackie, Melanie Willmott
- The United States: Alicia Albe, Tara McCargo, Meaghan Muller
- Uzbekistan: Lilya Nasirova, Tanya Budarina, Elena Mesheryakova, Irina Zamyatina
- (Socialist Federal Republic of Yugoslavia) Yugoslavia: Iva Zimonjic

== Individual All-Around ==
Place	Nation	Name	Total
1	Ukraine	Elena Vitrichenko	39.900
2	Russia	Natalia Lipkovskaya	39.866
3	Russia	Yanina Batyrchina	39.832
4	Belarus	Evgenia Pavlina	39.706
5	Belarus	Yulia Raskina	39.623
6	Bulgaria	Teodora Alexandrova	39.540
7	France	Eva Serrano	39.499
8	Ukraine	Tatiana Popova	39.482
9	Germany	Edita Schaufler	39.449
10	Germany	Magdalena Brzeska	39.366

== Individual Rope ==
Place	Nation	Name	Result
1	Russia	Yanina Batyrchina	9.950
1	Ukraine	Elena Vitrichenko	9.950
3	Russia	Natalia Lipkovskaya	9.950
4	Belarus	Evgenia Pavlina	9.916
5	France	Eva Serrano	9.875
6	Belarus	Yulia Raskina	9.866
7	Ukraine	Tatiana Popova	9.841
8	Germany	Edita Schaufler	9.791

== Individual Hoop ==
Place	Nation	Name	Result
1	Russia	Natalia Lipkovskaya	10.000
2	Ukraine	Elena Vitrichenko	10.000
3	France	Eva Serrano	9.950
4	Bulgaria	Teodora Alexandrova	9.941
5	Russia	Yanina Batyrchina	9.916
6	Germany	Edita Schaufler	9.850
7	Bulgaria	Boryana Gineva	9.841
8	Germany	Magdalena Brzeska	9.562

== Individual Clubs ==
Place	Nation	Name	Result
1	Ukraine	Elena Vitrichenko	10.000
2	Russia	Yanina Batyrchina	9.950
3	Russia	Natalia Lipkovskaya	9.900
3	Ukraine	Tatiana Popova	9.900
5	Germany	Magdalena Brzeska	9.833
6	Germany	Edita Schaufler	9.816
7	Bulgaria	Viktoria Danova	9.716
8	Spain	Almudena Cid Tostado	9.691

== Individual Ribbon ==
Place	Nation	Name	Result
1	Ukraine	Elena Vitrichenko	10.000
2	Russia	Natalia Lipkovskaya	10.000
3	France	Eva Serrano	9.933
4	Belarus	Evgenia Pavlina	9.925
5	Russia	Amina Zaripova	9.874
6	Germany	Edita Schaufler	9.858
7	Spain	Almudena Cid Tostado	9.841
8	Germany	Magdalena Brzeska	9.775

== Team All-Around Final ==
Place	Nation	Total
1	Russia	118.678
2	Belarus	118.264
3	Ukraine	118.229
4	Germany	117.397
5	Bulgaria	78.290
6	Italy	77.927
7	Spain	77.517
8	Japan	76.979
