= Gymnastics at the 1996 Summer Olympics =

Gymnastics at the Games of the XXVI Olympiad
- Venue: Georgia Dome (artistic); Stegeman Coliseum (rhythmic)
- Dates: 20 July – 4 August 1996

At the 1996 Summer Olympics, two different gymnastics disciplines were contested: artistic gymnastics and rhythmic gymnastics. The artistic gymnastics events were held at the Georgia Dome from July 20–25 and July 28–29. The rhythmic gymnastics events were held at Stegeman Coliseum in nearby Athens, on the campus of the University of Georgia from August 1–4.

The women's rhythmic group all-around was contested for the first time at these Games.

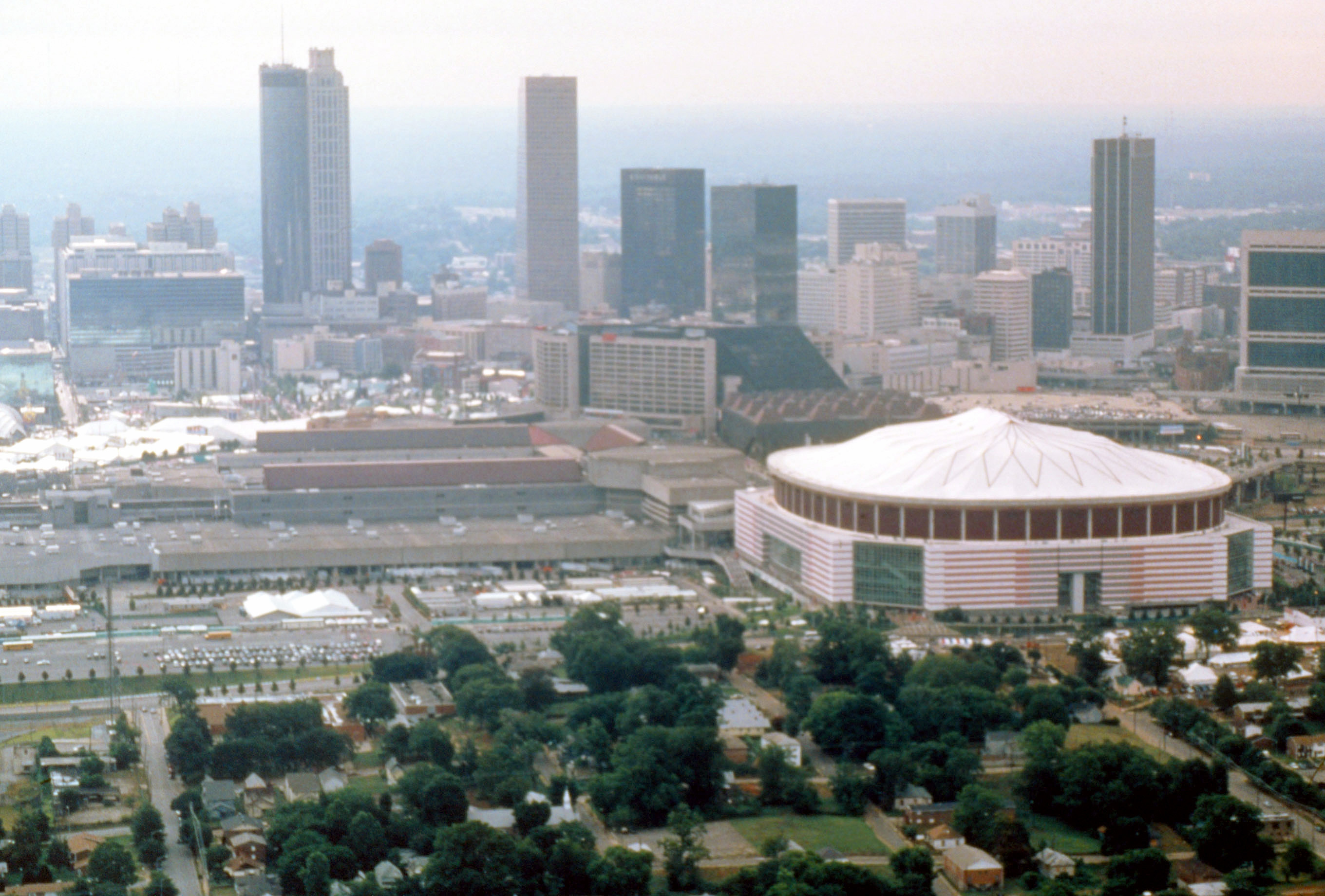
Georgia Dome

== Artistic gymnastics ==
=== Format of competition ===
The gymnastics competition at the 1996 Summer Olympics was carried out in three stages:

- Competition I - The team competition/qualification round in which gymnasts, including those who were not part of a team, performed both compulsory and optional exercises. Six of the seven team members performed on each apparatus, while only the five highest scores during each rotation were used to determine the overall team total. The thirty-six highest scoring gymnasts in the all-around qualified to the individual all-around competition. The eight highest-scoring gymnasts on each apparatus qualified to the final for that apparatus.
- Competition II - The individual all-around competition, in which those who qualified from Competition I performed exercises on each apparatus. The final score of each gymnast was determined by adding the scores earned by him or her on each of the six apparatuses in the men's competition and each of the four apparatuses in the women's competition.
- Competition III - The apparatus finals, in which those who qualified during Competition I performed an exercise on the individual apparatus on which he or she had qualified. The final score of each gymnast determined by the score earned by him or her on the apparatus during this competition.

Each country was limited to three gymnasts in the all-around final and two gymnasts in each apparatus final.

=== Men's events ===
Games	Gold	Silver	Bronze
Team all-around	Russia; Sergei Kharkov; Nikolai Kryukov; Alexei Nemov; Yevgeni Podgorny; Dmitri Trush; Dmitri Vasilenko; Alexei Voropaev	China; Fan Bin; Fan Hongbin; Huang Huadong; Huang Liping; Li Xiaoshuang; Shen Jian; Zhang Jinjing	Ukraine; Ihor Korobchynskyi; Oleg Kosiak; Hrihoriy Misyutin; Vladimir Shamenko; Rustam Sharipov; Olexander Svitlichni; Yuri Yermakov
Individual all-around	Li Xiaoshuang; China	Alexei Nemov; Russia	Vitaly Scherbo; Belarus
Floor exercise	Ioannis Melissanidis; Greece	Li Xiaoshuang; China	Alexei Nemov; Russia
Pommel horse	Li Donghua; Switzerland	Marius Urzică; Romania	Alexei Nemov; Russia
Rings	Yuri Chechi; Italy	Szilveszter Csollány; Hungary Dan Burincă; Romania	none awarded
Vault	Alexei Nemov; Russia	Yeo Hong-Chul; South Korea	Vitaly Scherbo; Belarus
Parallel bars	Rustam Sharipov; Ukraine	Jair Lynch; United States	Vitaly Scherbo; Belarus
Horizontal bar	Andreas Wecker; Germany	Krasimir Dunev; Bulgaria	Fan Bin; China Alexei Nemov; Russia Vitaly Scherbo; Belarus

=== Women's events ===
Games	Gold	Silver	Bronze
Team all-around	United States; Amanda Borden; Amy Chow; Dominique Dawes; Shannon Miller; Dominique Moceanu; Jaycie Phelps; Kerri Strug	Russia; Elena Dolgopolova; Rozalia Galiyeva; Elena Grosheva; Svetlana Khorkina; Dina Kochetkova; Yevgeniya Kuznetsova; Oksana Liapina	Romania; Simona Amânar; Gina Gogean; Ionela Loaieș; Alexandra Marinescu; Lavinia Miloșovici; Mirela Țugurlan
Individual all-around	Lilia Podkopayeva; Ukraine	Gina Gogean; Romania	Simona Amânar; Romania Lavinia Miloșovici; Romania
Vault	Simona Amânar; Romania	Mo Huilan; China	Gina Gogean; Romania
Uneven bars	Svetlana Khorkina; Russia	Amy Chow; United States Bi Wenjing; China	none awarded
Balance beam	Shannon Miller; United States	Lilia Podkopayeva; Ukraine	Gina Gogean; Romania
Floor exercise	Lilia Podkopayeva; Ukraine	Simona Amânar; Romania	Dominique Dawes; United States

== Rhythmic gymnastics ==
Games	Gold	Silver	Bronze
Individual all-around	Ekaterina Serebrianskaya; Ukraine	Yanina Batyrchina; Russia	Elena Vitrichenko; Ukraine
Group all-around	Spain; Estela Giménez Cid; Marta Baldó Marín; Nuria Cabanillas Provencio; Lorena Guréndez García; Estíbaliz Martínez Yerro; Tania Lamarca Celada	Bulgaria; Ina Delcheva; Valentina Kevlian; Maria Koleva; Maja Tabakova; Ivelina Taleva; Vjara Vatachka	Russia; Yevgeniya Bochkaryova; Irina Dzyuba; Yuliya Ivanova; Yelena Krivoshey; Olga Shtyrenko; Angelina Yushkova

== Medal table ==
Rank	Nation	Gold	Silver	Bronze	Total
1	Ukraine	4	1	2	7
2	Russia	3	3	4	10
3	United States	2	2	1	5
4	Romania	1	4	5	10
5	China	1	4	1	6
6	Germany	1	0	0	1
6	Greece	1	0	0	1
6	Italy	1	0	0	1
6	Spain	1	0	0	1
6	Switzerland	1	0	0	1
11	Bulgaria	0	2	0	2
12	Hungary	0	1	0	1
12	South Korea	0	1	0	1
14	Belarus	0	0	4	4
Totals (14 entries)		16	18	17	51

== See also ==
- Gymnastics at the 1994 Asian Games
- Gymnastics at the 1994 Commonwealth Games
- Gymnastics at the 1995 Pan American Games
- 1995 World Artistic Gymnastics Championships
