= Susan Benike =

German gymnast (born 1981)

- Born: 14 September 1981 (age 44) Halle (Saale), Germany
- Height: 160 cm (5 ft 3 in)

Gymnastics career
- Discipline: Rhythmic gymnastics
- Country represented: Germany
- Club: TV Wattenscheid
- Head coach: Carmen Weber
- Assistant coach: Livia Medilanski
- Retired: yes

Susan Benike (born 14 September 1981) is a retired German rhythmic gymnast. She was part of the national senior group

== Biography ==
Benicke won nine German national titles. In 1998 she was integrated into the national senior group, competing at the World Championships in Seville along Selma Neuhaus, Jeanine Fissler, Anna Nölder, Anne Jung and Ellen Jackël, they finished 14th in the All-Around and 8th with 6 balls.

In May 1999 she took 6th place in the All-Around, 5th place with 5 pair of clubs and 4th with 3 ribbons and 2 hoops with the group at the European Championships. At the World Championships in Osaka they were 5th in the All-Around, 5th with 10 clubs and 7th with 3 ribbons and 2 hoops, thus qualifying for the following year's Olympics.

Susan and her teammates Friederike Arlt, Jeanine Fissler, Selma Neuhaus, Jessica Schumacher and Annika Seibel achieved a surprising fourth place at the 2000 Sydney Olympics, this was the best ever rhythmic gymnastics result in German Olympic history.

After her retirement she competed in show dancing and won a silver medal at World Championships and two golds at Europeans. She later became a graduated sports teacher, yoga coach, and personal trainer in Munich.
