= Dörte Schiltz =

German rhythmic gymnast

- Born: 21 December 1976 (age 49) Lüdenscheid, West Germany
- Height: 168 cm (5 ft 6 in)
- Spouse: Martin Kubicka

Gymnastics career
- Discipline: Rhythmic gymnastics
- Country represented: Germany (?-1996)
- Club: TV Wattenscheid
- Retired: yes

Dörte Schiltz (born 21 December 1976) is a former German rhythmic gymnast.

== Biography ==
She won several German national titles, and in 1996 she competed at the Olympic Games in Atlanta, the first edition to feature the group competition, as a member of the German group. Her teammates were Nicole Bittner, Katrin Hoffmann, Anne Jung, Luise Stäblein and Katharina Wildermut. They finished 8th out of 9 groups and so did not advance to the final.

In October 2003 she married her boyfriend, trampoline gymnast Martin Kubicka. On 7 September 2005 she gave birth to a daughter named Polina.
