= Nicole Bittner =

German rhythmic gymnast

- Born: 9 July 1978 (age 48) Bernburg, East Germany
- Height: 163 cm (5 ft 4 in)

Gymnastics career
- Discipline: Rhythmic gymnastics
- Country represented: Germany (?-1996)
- Club: TV Wattenscheid
- Retired: yes

Nicole Bittner (born 9 July 1977) is a former German rhythmic gymnast.

== Biography ==
She won several German national titles and in 1996 she competed at the Olympic Games in Atlanta, the first edition to feature the group competition, as a member of the German group along Dörte Schiltz, Katrin Hoffmann, Anne Jung, Luise Stäblein and Katharina Wildermut. They finished 8th out of 9 and so did not advance to the final.
