= Maya Tabakova =

Bulgarian rhythmic gymnast

- Born: 11 May 1978 (age 48) Sofia, Bulgaria
- Height: 169 cm (5 ft 7 in) (at the 1996 Olympic Games)

Gymnastics career
- Discipline: Rhythmic gymnastics
- Country represented: Bulgaria
- Club: Levski Sofia, Sofia
Medal record
Olympic Games
Silver medal – second place	1996 Atlanta	Group all-around

Maya Tabakova (also spelled Maja or Maia Tabakova; Bulgarian: Мая Табакова; born 11 May 1978 in Sofia) is a Bulgarian former group rhythmic gymnast. She is the 1996 Olympic silver medalist, a two-time world champion (1995, 1996), and a two-time European all-around silver medalist (1993, 1995). She now works as a coach in the United States.

== Career ==
Tabakova was born in Sofia and began gymnastics at age 8.

In 1993, Tabakova became a member of the national group. She competed at the 1993 European Championships, where the group won the silver medal in the all-around. They also tied the Russian group for gold in the 4 hoops + 2 pairs of clubs final and won another silver in the 6 ropes final.

At the 1994 World Championships, the group won the bronze medal in the all-around. In the event finals, they again won gold in the 4 hoops + 2 pairs of clubs final and silver in the 6 ropes final.

In 1995, groups were reduced to five gymnasts, and Tabakova continued to compete with the group. At the 1995 European Championships, they won another silver medal in the all-around. They also won gold in the 3 balls + 2 ribbons final and a second silver in the 5 hoops final. Later in the year, they won the 1995 World Championships and took another gold in one of the event finals (5 hoops); they won silver in the mixed apparatus final.

The next year, in June, Tabakova and the other group members competed at the 1996 World Championships. They won a second straight world title. However, they struggled in the event finals, placing 7th in one and 8th in the other. In August, at the 1996 Olympic Games, held in Atlanta, she won the silver medal in the group event along with her teammates Ina Delcheva, Valentina Kevlian, Maria Koleva, Ivelina Taleva and Viara Vatashka. She later said that while they were excited to have won an Olympic medal, they were disappointed that they had not managed to win gold.

After the Olympics, she was invited to work with the Ringling Bros. and Barnum & Bailey Circus in the United States. She took the offer and toured with them, performing an aerial hoop act, from 1997 to 2005. She then moved to Reno, Nevada to join a trapeze artist she had met at the Ringling Bros. circus in performing at the Circus Circus Las Vegas, and she also coached in the area.

In 2007, she began performing with Cirque du Soleil. That November, she had a serious accident during a show where she fell 35 feet (11 m) to the stage. She was taken to the University Medical Center of Southern Nevada and was reported to still be in critical condition eight days after the accident.

Tabakova recovered from her injuries and continued working for Cirque Du Soleil until 2014. She co-founded a gym in Las Vegas in 2011, where she now coaches.

== See also ==
- Gymnastics at the 1996 Summer Olympics – Women's rhythmic group all-around
