= Bocchini =

Bocchini is an Italian surname. Notable people with the surname include:

- Arturo Bocchini (1880–1940), Italian police chief
- Joseph L. Bocchini Jr. (born 1944), American politician
- Manuela Bocchini (born 1980), Italian rhythmic gymnast
