= Pietrosanti =

Pietrosanti is an Italian surname. Notable people with the surname include:

- Francesco Pietrosanti (born 1963), Italian rugby union player and sports director
- Katia Pietrosanti (born 1979), Italian rhythmic gymnast
