= Wildermuth =

Wildermuth is a German surname derived from the German word "wild" meaning "wild," and the element "muth," which comes from the Old High German "muot" meaning "to desire". Notable people with the surname include:

- Hermann-Eberhard Wildermuth (1890–1952), German politician and a member of the FDP/DVP
- Jack Wildermuth (1993), Australian cricketer
- Katharina Wildermuth (1979), German rhythmic gymnast
- Ottilie Wildermuth (1817–1877), German writer
