= Kalpala =

Kalpala is a surname. Notable people with the surname include:

- Eino Kalpala (1926–2022), Finnish alpine skier
- Katri Kalpala (born 1976), Finnish rhythmic gymnast
