= Jessica Schumacher =

German gymnast (born 1983)

- Born: 13 January 1983 (age 43) Saarlouis, Germany
- Height: 170 cm (5 ft 7 in)

Gymnastics career
- Discipline: Rhythmic gymnastics
- Country represented: Germany
- Club: TV Wattenscheid
- Head coach: Carmen Weber
- Assistant coach: Livia Medilanski
- Retired: yes

Jessica Schumacher (born 13 January 1983) is a retired German rhythmic gymnast.

== Biography ==
In May 1999 she was part of the group took 6th place in the All-Around, 5th place with 5 pair of clubs and 4th with 3 ribbons and 2 hoops with the group at the European Championships. At the World Championships in Osaka they were 5th in the All-Around, 5th with 10 clubs and 7th with 3 ribbons and 2 hoops, thus qualifying for the following year's Olympics.

Jessica and her teammates Friederike Arlt, Susan Benike, Selma Neuhaus, Jeanine Fissler and Annika Seibel achieved a surprising fourth place at the 2000 Sydney Olympics, this was the best ever rhythmic gymnastics result in German Olympic history.

After her retirement from the sport she studied economics and economic psychology and worked with a bank.
