= Jeanine Fissler =

German gymnast (born 1980)

- Nickname: Fissi
- Born: 12 October 1980 (age 45) Berlin, Germany
- Height: 162 cm (5 ft 4 in)

Gymnastics career
- Discipline: Rhythmic gymnastics
- Country represented: Germany
- Club: TV Wattenscheid
- Head coach: Carmen Weber
- Assistant coach: Livia Medilanski
- Former coaches: Daniela Wollenhaupt, Barbara Rothenburg
- Retired: yes

Jeanine Fissler (born 12 October 1980) is a retired German rhythmic gymnast. She was part of the national senior group.

== Biography ==
Fissler started as an artistic gymnast as one of her mom's sisters was involved with the sport and began training her, she later switch to rhythmic. Her breakthrough came in 1994/95 with the first individual successes at the North German Championships. In 1996 she entered the national senior group, competing at the 1998 World Championships in Seville along Selma Neuhaus, Susan Benicke, Anna Nölder, Anne Jung and Ellen Jackël, they finished 14th in the All-Around and 8th with 6 balls.

In 1999 she became the group's captain, in May she took 6th place in the All-Around, 5th place with 5 pair of clubs and 4th with 3 ribbons and 2 hoops with the group at the European Championships. At the World Championships in Osaka they were 5th in the All-Around, 5th with 10 clubs and 7th with 3 ribbons and 2 hoops, thus qualifying for the following year's Olympics. At the time she lived in Bochum, with the Ülengin family, along her teammate Annika Seibel.

Jeanine and her teammates Friederike Arlt, Susan Benike, Selma Neuhaus, Jessica Schumacher and Annika Seibel achieved a surprising fourth place at the 2000 Sydney Olympics, this was the best ever rhythmic gymnastics result in German Olympic history.

Fissler later became a graduated sports coach by profession and founded her own gymnastics talent school at Berlin.
