= Valentina Kevliyan =

Bulgarian rhythmic gymnast

- Born: 11 March 1978 (age 48) Plovdiv, Bulgaria
- Height: 172 cm (5 ft 8 in) (at the 1996 Olympic Games)

Gymnastics career
- Discipline: Rhythmic gymnastics
- Country represented: Bulgaria
- Club: Levski Sofia, Sofia
Medal record
Olympic Games
Silver medal – second place	1996 Atlanta	Group all-around

Valentina Kevliyan (or Valentina Kevlian, Bulgarian: Валентина Кевлиян; born 11 March 1978 in Plovdiv) is a Bulgarian rhythmic gymnast.

At the 1996 Olympic Games, held in Atlanta, she won a silver medal as part of the Bulgarian rhythmic gymnastics group (along with teammates Ina Delcheva, Maria Koleva, Maya Tabakova, Ivelina Taleva and Viara Vatashka).

== See also ==
- Gymnastics at the 1996 Summer Olympics – Women's rhythmic group all-around
