= Aleksandr Belanovsky =

Belarusian gymnast (born 1972)

- Born: 3 May 1972 (age 54) Minsk, Belarus

Gymnastics career
- Discipline: Men's artistic gymnastics
- Country represented: Belarus

Aleksandr Belanovsky (born 3 May 1972) is a Belarusian gymnast. He competed in eight events at the 1996 Summer Olympics.
