= Teodora Alexandrova =

Bulgarian rhythmic gymnast (born 1981)

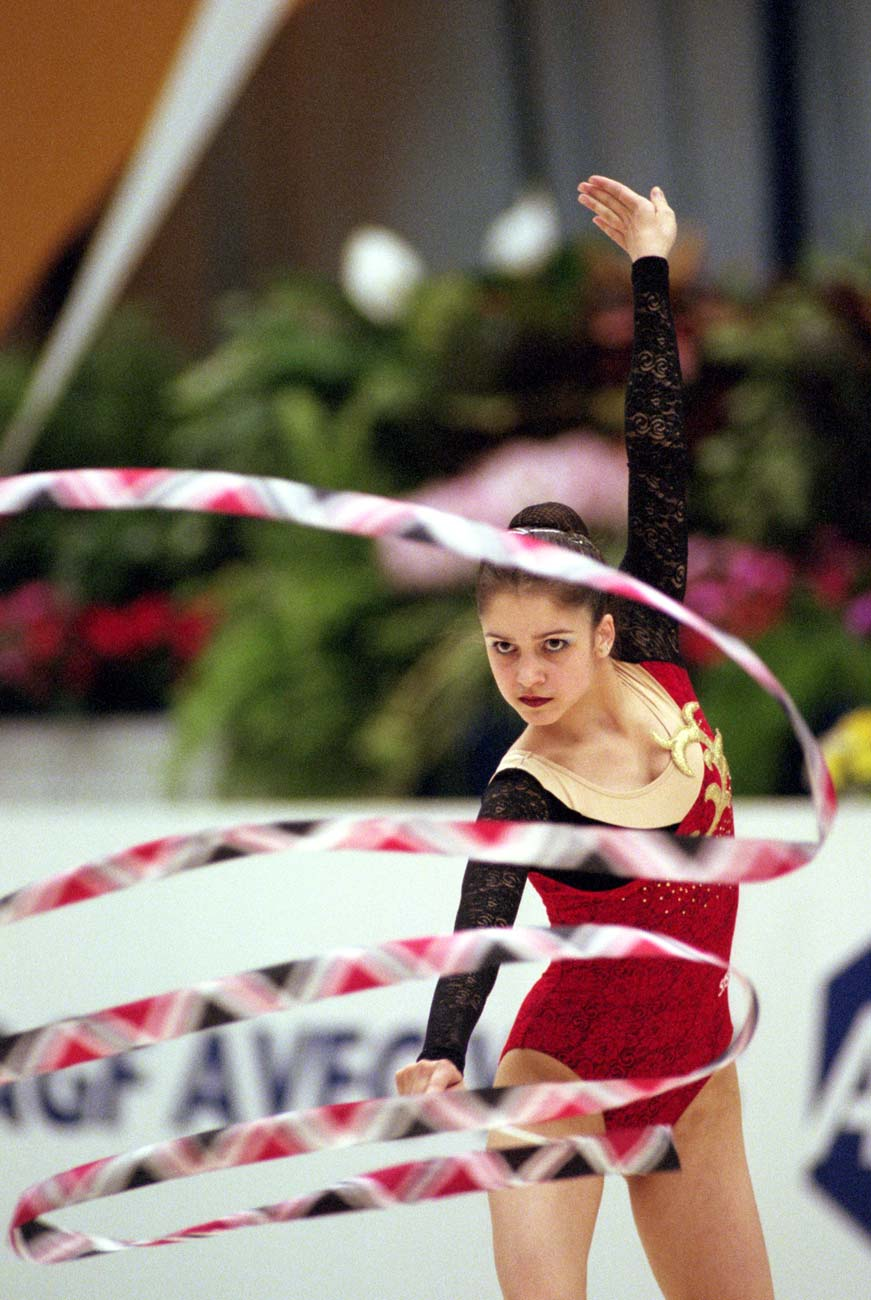
- Teodora Alexandrova at Corbeil-Essones in France 2000

Personal information
- Born: 24 September 1981 (age 44)

Gymnastics career
- Discipline: Rhythmic gymnastics
- Country represented: Bulgaria
- Retired: yes
Medal record
Rhythmic gymnastics
Representing Bulgaria
Junior European Championships
| Gold medal – first place | 1995 Prague | All-Around |
| Gold medal – first place | 1995 Prague | Hoop |
| Silver medal – second place | 1995 Prague | Rope |
| Silver medal – second place | 1995 Prague | Clubs |
| Silver medal – second place | 1995 Prague | Ribbon |
| Bronze medal – third place | 1995 Prague | Team |

Teodora Alexandrova (Bulgarian: Теодора Александрова; born 24 September 1981 in Sofia, Bulgaria) is a Bulgarian former individual rhythmic gymnast. She is the 1995 Junior European all-around champion.

== Biography ==
Alexandrova started rhythmic gymnastics in 1986 at age 5. She trained with Neshka Robeva at the Levski club. Alexandrova was noted for her ability to turn and would include chains of pirouettes and other turns in her routines.

She was a promising junior and tied for 1995 European junior champion with Valeria Vatkina. She also won a medal in every event - one gold and three silvers in the apparatus finals, and bronze in the team event with her teammate Borislava Illieva. Alexandrova also competed that year at the International Tournament Ljubljana, where she won the junior category.

At the 1997 World Championships, she placed 6th in the all-around final. She competed at the 1998 Goodwill Games, where she was fourth all-around and won bronze in the clubs and ribbon finals. At the 1998 European Championships, she placed 8th.

In 1999, she went to the Kanazawa Renaissance Winter Festival, which featured Japanese and Bulgarian gymnasts as well as those from Kanazawa's sister city of Irkutsk, and she was voted the winner by the audience. At the 1999 World Championships, she finished 8th.

In 2000, she competed at the European Championships, where she placed 10th. She intended to compete at the 2000 Summer Olympics; however, she broke her leg, and although she said she was recovered in late August, the Bulgarian federation voted to replace her with Iva Tepeshanova on the advice of doctors who were not sure she would be in shape to compete. Alexandrova said she wanted to continue to compete, and at the end of the year, she competed at the World Cup Final.
