= Maria Koleva (rhythmic gymnast) =

Bulgarian rhythmic gymnast

- Born: 10 August 1977 (age 49) Sofia, Bulgaria
- Height: 176 cm (5 ft 9 in) (at the 1996 Olympic Games)

Gymnastics career
- Discipline: Rhythmic gymnastics
- Country represented: Bulgaria
- Club: Levski Sofia, Sofia
Medal record
Olympic Games
Silver medal – second place	1996 Atlanta	Group all-around

Maria Koleva (Bulgarian: Мария Колева; born 10 August 1977 in Sofia) is a Bulgarian rhythmic gymnast.

At the 1996 Olympic Games, held in Atlanta, she won a silver medal as part of the Bulgarian rhythmic gymnastics group (along with teammates Ina Delcheva, Valentina Kevlian, Maya Tabakova, Ivelina Taleva and Viara Vatashka).

== See also ==
- Gymnastics at the 1996 Summer Olympics – Women's rhythmic group all-around
