= Jessica Davis =

American rhythmic gymnast

- Born: April 10, 1978 (age 48) Greenbrae, California, U.S.

Gymnastics career
- Discipline: Rhythmic gymnastics
- Country represented: United States
- Club: Gymmarin Pacific
Medal record
Rhythmic gymnastics
Representing United States
Four Continents Championships
Gold medal – first place	1994 Seoul	Team
Silver medal – second place	1995 Cairo	Ribbon
Silver medal – second place	1995 Cairo	Rope
Bronze medal – third place	1995 Cairo	Clubs
Bronze medal – third place	1995 Cairo	Team
Pan American Games
Gold medal – first place	1995 Mar de Plata	Team
Silver medal – second place	1995 Mar de Plata	Clubs
Silver medal – second place	1995 Mar de Plata	Ribbon
Bronze medal – third place	1995 Mar de Plata	Individual all-around
Bronze medal – third place	1995 Mar de Plata	Rope

Jessica Davis (born April 10, 1978, Greenbrae, California) is an American rhythmic gymnast.

Davis competed for the United States in the rhythmic gymnastics individual all-around competition at the 1996 Summer Olympics in Atlanta. There she was 30th in the qualification round and did not advance to the semifinal.
