= Annika Seibel =

German gymnast (born 1983)

- Born: 30 November 1983 (age 42) Dahn, Germany
- Height: 164 cm (5 ft 5 in)

Gymnastics career
- Discipline: Rhythmic gymnastics
- Country represented: Germany
- Club: TV Wattenscheid
- Head coach: Carmen Weber
- Assistant coach: Livia Medilanski
- Retired: yes

Annika Seibel (born 30 November 1983) is a retired German rhythmic gymnast.

== Biography ==
In May 1999 Annika, as part of the senior group, took 6th place in the All-Around, 5th place with 5 pair of clubs and 4th with 3 ribbons and 2 hoops with the group at the European Championships. At the World Championships in Osaka they were 5th in the All-Around, 5th with 10 clubs and 7th with 3 ribbons and 2 hoops, thus qualifying for the following year's Olympics. At the time she lived in Bochum, with the Ülengin family, along her teammate Jeanine Fissler.

Annika and her teammates Friederike Arlt, Susan Benicke, Jeanine Fissler, Jessica Schumacher and Selma Neuhaus achieved a surprising fourth place at the 2000 Sydney Olympics, this was the best ever rhythmic gymnastics result in German Olympic history.

Seibel studied sports in Cologne and became a graduated sports and yoga coach. She also participated in show dancing events and worked with the agency of her former coach Carmen Weber in Ratingen.
