= Camille Martens =

Canadian rhythmic gymnast and coach

Camille Martens Lafon
- Full name: Camille Lynette Martens Lafon
- Nickname: Cami
- Born: June 1, 1976 (age 50) Vancouver, British Columbia, Canada
- Height: 173 cm (5 ft 8 in) (at the 1996 Olympics)

Gymnastics career
- Discipline: Rhythmic gymnastics
- Country represented: Canada (1990, 1991, 1992, 1993, 1994, 1995, 1996, 1999)
- Club: Kalev RSG Club (1995-1996), Club Elite (1986-1994), Aura/Okanagan RG Stars 1999
- Head coach: Ludmilla Dimitrova
- Assistant coaches: Svetlana Joukova, Evelyn Koop
- Former coaches: Lori Fung, Tricia Gilmore Cohee
- Retired: 1996 (with a short 5 month come-back in 1999)
Medal record
Representing Canada
Commonwealth Games
Gold medal – first place	1994 Victoria	Team
Silver medal – second place	1994 Victoria	All Around
Silver medal – second place	1994 Victoria	Ball
Silver medal – second place	1994 Victoria	Clubs
Silver medal – second place	1994 Victoria	Ribbon
- Last updated on: 02.02.2023.

Camille Martens (born June 1, 1976 in Vancouver, British Columbia) is a former Canadian rhythmic gymnast who worked as a coach, speaker and mentor for over 30 years. She was a master course developer for NCCP, National Coaching Chair (16 years), President of the BC Rhythmic Gymnastics federation and volunteered in a variety of roles with Gymnastics Canada.

As an athlete, Martens was the Canadian and Senior Champion for 5 years. She won medals at Junior Pan Ams (1990) and the Four Continents Championships (1990, 1992, 1994). At the 1993 World Championships in Alicante, Spain, she made finals and finished 21st. She competed in the 1994 Commonwealth Games and was the games most medaled athlete winning 5 medals (1 gold, 3 silver, 1 bronze). Two years later, she competed injured at the rhythmic gymnastics individual all-around competition at the 1996 Summer Olympics in Atlanta. There, she was 33rd in the qualification round after dropping her ball.

After finishing her career, Martens founded a rhythmic gymnastics club in the Okanagan Valley which developed 24 members of Canada’s High Performance Team Pool, Canadian Champions and medallists at Pacific Rim and Pan Am Championships. Many of her students have represented Canada internationally. She also founded the Cirque Theatre Company where she wrote, produced and directed 26 original productions.

Martens is the mother of two adult children and resides in Vernon, British Columbia, Canada. In 2022 she married French snowboarder Benoit Lafon. They have since closed the club and opened Next Peak Living, a course, coaching, retreat business.
