= Nina Taborsky =

Austrian rhythmic gymnast

- Born: 28 April 1978 (age 48) Vienna, Austria
- Height: 167 cm (5 ft 6 in) (at the 1996 Olympics)

Gymnastics career
- Discipline: Rhythmic gymnastics
- Country represented: Austria

Nina Taborsky (born 28 April 1978, Vienna) is an Austrian rhythmic gymnast.

Taborsky competed for Austria in the rhythmic gymnastics individual all-around competition at the 1996 Summer Olympics in Atlanta. There she was 29th in the qualification round and did not advance to the semifinal.
