= Anna Shishova =

Russian rhythmic gymnast

Anna Chichova
- Анна Шишова
- Born: 15 May 1981 (age 45) Moscow, Soviet Union

Gymnastics career
- Discipline: Rhythmic gymnastics
- Country represented: Russia
- Head coaches: Alla Yanina, Oksana Skaldina
Medal record
Representing Russia
Rhythmic Gymnastics
Event	1st	2nd	3rd
European Championships	1	0	2
Total	1	0	2
European Championships
Gold medal – first place	1995 Prague	Team
Bronze medal – third place	1995 Prague	Rope
Bronze medal – third place	1995 Prague	Hoop

Anna Shishova (off. sp.: Anna Chichova; Russian: Анна Шишова; born 15 May 1981) is a Russian individual rhythmic gymnast.

She is the 1995 European team champion and rope and hoop bronze medalist. On the national level, she is the 1996 Russian national hoop silver medalist and the 1997 Russian national all-around, rope, hoop, clubs and ribbon champion and ball silver medalist.

== Biography ==
Shishova was born in Moscow on 15 May 1981. She trained at the Olympic Reserve School No. 74. Her first coach was Irina Karpova. Later, she trained under Alla Yanina and Oksana Skaldina.

At 14, she was part of the Russian teams at the 1995 European Chamionships in Prague, Czech Republic, and at the 1995 Aeon Cup in Tokyo, Japan. At the Europeans, she won the team gold and two bronze medals. At the Aeon Cup, she won the team bronze and the individual junior all-around gold.

At 16, she won the all-around (ahead of Irina Tchachina, Yulia Barsukova, very young Alina Kabaeva, Elena Chalamova and Amina Zaripova) and four (one of them divided with Kabaeva) out of five apparatus finals at the 1997 Russian Nationals.

== Competitive highlights ==
Year	Event	Team	AA	Rope	Hoop	Ball	Clubs	Ribb.
International
1995	European Championships	1st	4	3rd	3rd			
1995	Aeon Cup	3rd	1st J					
National'
1995	Moscow Championships		3rd					
1996	Russian Championships				2nd			
1997	Russian Cup		2nd					1st
1997	Russian Championships		1st	1st	1st	2nd /3rd	1st	1st /2nd
