= Ekaterina Abramia =

Georgian rhythmic gymnast

- Born: 25 August 1979 (age 47) Tbilisi, Georgia
- Height: 167 cm (5 ft 6 in) (at the 1996 Olympics)

Gymnastics career
- Discipline: Rhythmic gymnastics
- Country represented: Georgia

Ekaterina Abramia (Georgian: ეკათერინა აბრამია, born 25 August 1979 in Tbilisi) is a Georgian rhythmic gymnast.

Abramia competed for Georgia in the rhythmic gymnastics individual all-around competition at the 1996 Summer Olympics in Atlanta. There she was 25th in the qualification round and did not advance to the semifinal.
