= Valentina Rovetta =

Italian rhythmic gymnast

Personal information
- Nationality: Italian
- Born: 24 July 1980 (age 45) Bergamo, Italy

Sport
- Sport: Rhythmic gymnastics

Valentina Rovetta (born 24 July 1980) is an Italian rhythmic gymnast. She competed in the women's group all-around event at the 1996 Summer Olympics.
