= Katia Pietrosanti =

Italian rhythmic gymnast (born 1979)

- Born: 22 June 1979 (age 47) Como, Province of Como, Italy
- Height: 164 cm (5 ft 5 in) (at the 1996 Olympics)

Gymnastics career
- Discipline: Rhythmic gymnastics
- Country represented: Italy
- Club: SG Comenze Como
Medal record
Junior European Championships
Silver medal – second place	1993 Bucharest	Clubs

Katia Pietrosanti (born 22 June 1979, Como) is an Italian rhythmic gymnast. She is the 1993 European Junior silver medalist in clubs.

Pietrosanti competed for Italy in the rhythmic gymnastics individual all-around competition at the 1996 Summer Olympics in Atlanta. There she was 20th in the qualification round and advanced to the semifinal. In the semifinal she was 14th and did not advance to the final of 10 competitors.
