= Frédérique Léhon =

French rhythmic gymnast

Personal information
- Nationality: French
- Born: 29 October 1980 (age 45) Boulogne-sur-Mer, France

Sport
- Sport: Rhythmic gymnastics
Medal record
Rhythmic Gymnastics
Representing France
European Championships
Bronze medal – third place	1995 Prague	3 balls/2 ribbons

Frédérique Léhon (born 29 October 1980) is a French rhythmic gymnast.

== Biography ==
Frédérique Lehon began gymnastics with the Le Réveil sports association in Boulogne-sur-mer. Quickly spotted for her abilities, she joined the Calais rhythmic and sports gymnastics club, then considered one of the best in France.

She was selected for the national team, along with Charlotte Camboulives, Caroline Chimot, Sylvie Didone, Audrey Grosclaude and Nadia Mimoun. The team finished 3rd at the 1995 Rhythmic Gymnastics European Championships in Prague (ball / ribbon) and 5th at the 1995 World Rhythmic Gymnastics Championships in Vienna, securing (for the top 8 teams) a place at the Olympic Games the following year.

At the age of 15 and a half, she competed in the women's group all-around event at the 1996 Summer Olympics. She finished in 4th place in the Ensembles competition.

Forced to end her career due to injury after the Games, she became a coach at Le Réveil and in the Paris region. She qualified as a sports educator and set up the rhythmic gymnastics section at the La Fraternelle association in Outreau. She went on to manage a medical practice.
