= Katri Kalpala =

Finnish rhythmic gymnast

- Full name: Katri Johanna Kalpala
- Born: 29 September 1976 (age 49) Helsinki, Uusimaa, Finland
- Height: 170 cm (5 ft 7 in) (at the 1996 Olympics)

Gymnastics career
- Discipline: Rhythmic gymnastics
- Country represented: Finland
- Club: Voimistelu- ja urheiluseura Elise, Helsinki

Katri Kalpala (born 29 September 1976 in Helsinki) is a Finnish rhythmic gymnast.

Kalpala competed for Finland in the rhythmic gymnastics individual all-around competition at the 1996 Summer Olympics in Atlanta. There she was 34th in the qualification round and did not advance to the semifinal.

== Family ==
Her father is businessman Asmo Kalpala (fi).
