= Evangelia Sotiriou =

Greek rhythmic gymnast (born 1980)

- Born: 2 March 1980 (age 46) Athens, Attiki, Greece
- Height: 167 cm (5 ft 6 in) (at the 1996 Olympics)

Gymnastics career
- Discipline: Rhythmic gymnastics
- Country represented: Greece
- Club: Panellinios GS, Athina

Evangelia Sotiriou (Greek: Ευαγγελία Σωτηριου, born 2 March 1980, Athens) is a Greek rhythmic gymnast.

Sotiriou competed for Greece in the rhythmic gymnastics individual all-around competition at the 1996 Summer Olympics in Atlanta. There, she was 26th in the qualification round and didn't advance to the semifinal.
