= Cai Yingying =

Chinese rhythmic gymnast

- Born: 7 December 1978 (age 47) China
- Height: 162 cm (5 ft 4 in)

Gymnastics career
- Discipline: Rhythmic gymnastics
- Country represented: China (?-1996)
- Retired: Yes

Cai Yingying (born 7 December 1978) is a retired Chinese rhythmic gymnast.

== Biography ==
In 1996 she competed in the Olympic Games in Atlanta, the first to feature the group event, as part of the group of China along Huang Ting, Zhong Li, Zheng Ni and Huang Ying. The group finished 6th in the qualifying round and 5th in the final behind Spain, Bulgaria, Russia and France.
