= Selma Neuhaus =

German gymnast (born 1981)

- Born: 16 October 1981 (age 44) Gütersloh, Germany
- Height: 164 cm (5 ft 5 in)

Gymnastics career
- Discipline: Rhythmic gymnastics
- Country represented: Germany
- Club: TV Wattenscheid
- Head coach: Carmen Weber
- Retired: yes

Selma Neuhaus (born 16 October 1981) is a retired German rhythmic gymnast. She was part of the national senior group.

== Career ==
At the 1998 World Championships in Seville, Neuhaus competed along with the other group members, Jeanine Fissler, Susan Benicke, Anna Nölder, Anne Jung and Ellen Jackël. They finished 14th in the all-around and 8th with 6 balls.

She and her teammates Friederike Arlt, Susan Benicke, Jeanine Fissler, Jessica Schumacher and Annika Seibel achieved a surprising fourth place at the 2000 Sydney Olympics; this was the best ever rhythmic gymnastics result in German Olympic history.

Neuhaus later worked occasionally with a circus in Cologne, and she also studied sports and arts in the same city and became a graduated sports and yoga coach. She also participated in show dancing events and worked with the agency of her former coach Carmen Weber in Ratingen. She has been teaching intensive yoga at Studio Relevé since 2009.
