= Birgit Schielin =

Austrian rhythmic gymnast

- Born: 22 March 1979 (age 47) Vienna, Austria
- Height: 174 cm (5 ft 9 in) (at the 1996 Olympics)

Gymnastics career
- Discipline: Rhythmic gymnastics
- Country represented: Austria

Birgit Schielin (born 22 March 1979 in Vienna) is an Austrian rhythmic gymnast.

Schielin competed for Austria in the rhythmic gymnastics individual all-around competition at the 1996 Summer Olympics in Atlanta. There she was 24th in the qualification round and did not advance to the semifinal.
