= Valentina Marino =

Italian rhythmic gymnast

Personal information
- Nationality: Italian
- Born: 5 October 1977 (age 48) Syracuse, Italy

Sport
- Sport: Rhythmic gymnastics

Valentina Marino (born 5 October 1977) is an Italian rhythmic gymnast. She competed in the women's group all-around event at the 1996 Summer Olympics.
