= Andrea Šebestová =

Czech rhythmic gymnast

- Born: 16 March 1978 (age 48) Plzeň, Plzeňský kraj, Czechoslovakia
- Height: 162 cm (5 ft 4 in) (at the 1996 Olympics)

Gymnastics career
- Discipline: Rhythmic gymnastics
- Country represented: Czech Republic
- Club: GITY Brno

Andrea Šebestová (born 16 March 1978) is a Czech rhythmic gymnast.

Šebestová competed for the Czech Republic in the rhythmic gymnastics individual all-around competition at the 1996 Summer Olympics in Atlanta. There she was 28th in the qualification round and did not advance to the semifinal.
