= Nicoletta Tinti =

Italian rhythmic gymnast

Personal information
- Nationality: Italian
- Born: 22 May 1979 (age 46) Arezzo, Italy

Sport
- Sport: Rhythmic gymnastics

Nicoletta Tinti (born 22 May 1979) is an Italian rhythmic gymnast. She competed in the women's group all-around event at the 1996 Summer Olympics.
