= Anna Kwitniewska =

Polish rhythmic gymnast (born 1979)

- Born: 14 March 1979 (age 47) Gdynia, Pomeranian Voivodeship, Poland
- Height: 169 cm (5 ft 7 in) (at the 1996 Olympics)

Gymnastics career
- Discipline: Rhythmic gymnastics
- Country represented: Poland
- Club: MDK Gdynia

Anna Kwitniewska (born 14 March 1979 in Gdynia) is a Polish rhythmic gymnast.

Kwitniewska competed for Poland in the rhythmic gymnastics individual all-around competition at the 1996 Summer Olympics in Atlanta. There she was 27th in the qualification round and did not advance to the semifinal.
