= Caroline Chimot =

French rhythmic gymnast

Personal information
- Nationality: French
- Born: 22 April 1978 (age 48) Seclin, France

Sport
- Sport: Rhythmic gymnastics
Medal record
Rhythmic Gymnastics
Representing France
European Championships
Bronze medal – third place	1995 Prague	3 balls/2 ribbons

Caroline Chimot (born 22 April 1978) is a French rhythmic gymnast. She competed in the women's group all-around event at the 1996 Summer Olympics.
