= Krystyna Leśkiewicz =

Polish rhythmic gymnast (born 1974)

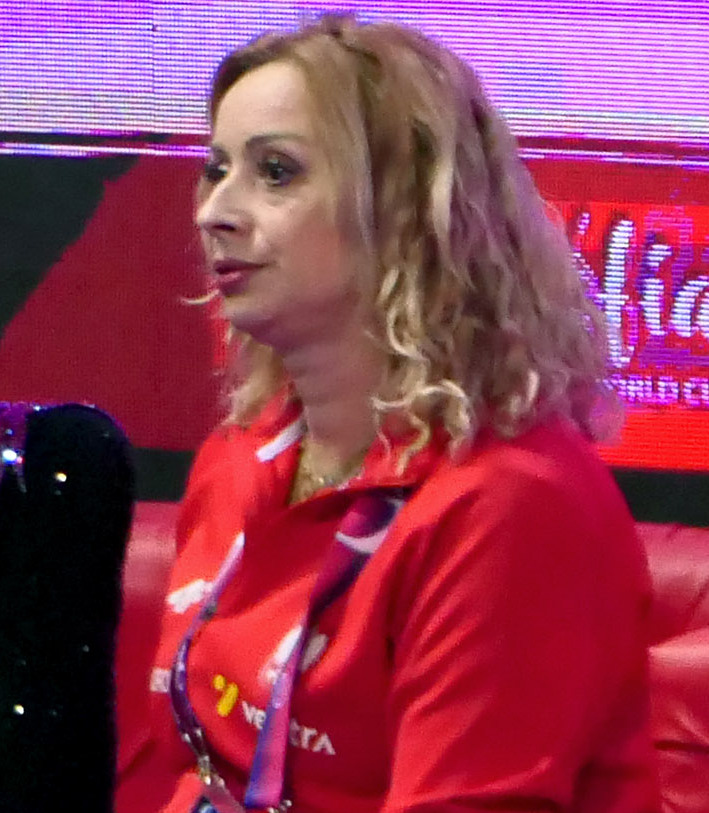
- Leśkiewicz-Lewińska in 2024

Personal information
- Born: 27 July 1974 (age 52) Wrocław, Lower Silesian Voivodeship, Poland
- Height: 175 cm (5 ft 9 in) (at the 1996 Olympics)

Gymnastics career
- Discipline: Rhythmic gymnastics
- Country represented: Poland
- Club: MDK Wrocław

Krystyna Leśkiewicz-Lewińska (née Leśkiewicz) (born 27 July 1974, Wrocław) is a retired Polish rhythmic gymnast.

Leśkiewicz competed at the 1995 World Championships in Vienna, Austria. She represented Poland in the rhythmic gymnastics individual all-around competition at the 1996 Summer Olympics in Atlanta. There she was 21st in the qualification round and did not advance to the semifinal.

She is now the head coach at the Polish rhythmic gymnastics club UKS KOPERNIK Wroclaw, where her two daughters train. The oldest, Liliana Lewinska, won 3 medals at the 2022 Junior European Championship and 2 medals at the 2023 Junior World Championships. She was also the head coach of the Polish individual national team until January 2026.
