= Andrea Szalay =

Hungarian rhythmic gymnast

- Born: 20 May 1976 (age 50) Budapest, Hungary
- Height: 163 cm (5 ft 4 in)

Gymnastics career
- Discipline: Rhythmic gymnastics
- Country represented: Hungary
- Club: Attitude RSG Sport Club

Andrea Szalay (born 20 May 1976 in Budapest) is a retired Hungarian rhythmic gymnast.

She represented Hungary in the individual rhythmic gymnastics all-around competition at two Olympic Games: in 1992 in Barcelona and in 1996 in Atlanta. In 1992 she was 28th in the qualification round and didn't advance to the final, in 1996 she was 36th in the qualification round and didn't advance to the semifinal.
