= Charlotte Camboulives =

French rhythmic gymnast (born 1980)

Personal information
- Nationality: French
- Born: 26 April 1980 (age 46) Calais, France

Sport
- Sport: Rhythmic gymnastics
Medal record
Rhythmic Gymnastics
Representing France
European Championships
Bronze medal – third place	1995 Prague	3 balls/2 ribbons

Charlotte Camboulives (born 26 April 1980) is a French rhythmic gymnast. She competed in the women's group all-around event at the 1996 Summer Olympics.
