= Nadia Mimoun =

French rhythmic gymnast

Personal information
- Nationality: French
- Born: 28 December 1978 (age 47) Montpellier, France

Sport
- Sport: Rhythmic gymnastics
Medal record
Rhythmic Gymnastics
Representing France
European Championships
Bronze medal – third place	1995 Prague	3 balls/2 ribbons

Nadia Mimoun (born 28 December 1978) is a French rhythmic gymnast. She competed in the women's group all-around event at the 1996 Summer Olympics.
