= Maria Pangalou =

Greek rhythmic gymnast (born 1979)

- Born: 28 April 1979 (age 47) Thessaloniki, Thessalia, Greece
- Height: 166 cm (5 ft 5 in) (at the 1996 Olympics)

Gymnastics career
- Discipline: Rhythmic gymnastics
- Country represented: Greece
- Club: AS Alexandros
Medal record
Representing Greece
European Championships
Silver medal – second place	1997 Patras	Hoop
Silver medal – second place	1997 Patras	Ribbon

Maria Pangalou (Greek: Μαρία Παγκαλου, born 28 April 1979, Thessaloniki) is a Greek rhythmic gymnast.

Pangalou competed for Greece in the rhythmic gymnastics individual all-around competition at the 1996 Summer Olympics in Atlanta. There, she was 8th in the qualification round and advanced to the semifinal. In the semifinal she was 12th and didn't advance to the final of 10 competitors.
