= Becky Turner =

American rhythmic gymnast

- Full name: Rebecca Ann Turner
- Born: 17 September 1977 (age 48) Marietta, Georgia, U.S.

Gymnastics career
- Discipline: Rhythmic gymnastics
- Country represented: United States (1994–2000)
- Head coach: Rossitza Todorova
- Retired: yes
Medal record
Rhythmic gymnastics
Representing United States
Pan American Games
Silver medal – second place	1995 Mar del Plata	Group all-Around
Four Continents Championships
Silver medal – second place	1995 Cairo	Group All-Around

Rebecca Ann Turner (born 17 September 1977), known as Becky Turner, is a retired American rhythmic gymnast. She was part of the national senior group.

== Biography ==
Becky Turner started out in artistic gymnastics for three years before switching to rhythmic. She was on the US national rhythmic gymnastics team from 1994 to 1997, being part of the national senior group along Aliane Baquerot, Lori Fredreickson, Mandy James, Ginny Ledgerwood, Kate Nelson, Brandi Siegel and Challen Sievers. They all lived together in suburban Chicago largely due to Sievers' father, Ron, whose construction firm renovated the house where the gymnasts lived and converted a former racquetball complex into the gym where they trained.

In 1994 the group was 19th at the World Championships in Paris. They won silver at the 1995 Pan American Games in Mar del Plata.

In the summer of 1996 Becky, Mandy James, Aliane Mata-Baquerot, Kate Nelson, Brandi Siegel and Challen Sievers were selected to compete at the Olympic Games in Atlanta, the first edition to feature the group competition. They finished in 9th place and so did not advance to the final.

She also competed at the 1996 World Championships, and placed second in the group at the 1995 Four Continents Championships.

Turner attended Kennesaw State University in Georgia after the Olympics. She later taught and coached rhythmic gymnastics at Elite Rhythmic Gymnastics in Downers Grove, Illinois.
