= Aliane Baquerot =

American rhythmic gymnast

- Full name: Aliane Mata Baquerot
- Born: 23 November 1978 (age 47) New York City, U.S.
- Spouse: Blaine Wilson

Gymnastics career
- Discipline: Rhythmic gymnastics
- Country represented: United States (1995–1996)
- Head coach: Rossitza Todorova
- Retired: yes
Medal record
Rhythmic gymnastics
Representing United States
Pan American Games
| Silver medal – second place | 1995 Mar del Plata | Group all-Around |
Four Continents Championships
| Silver medal – second place | 1995 Cairo | Group All-Around |

Aliane Mata-Baquerot (born 23 November 1978), known as Aliane Baquerot, is a retired American rhythmic gymnast. She was part of the national senior group.

== Biography ==
She was on the US national rhythmic gymnastics team from 1995 to 1996, being part of the national senior group along Kate Nelson, Lori Fredreickson, Mandy James, Ginny Ledgerwood, Becky Turner, Brandi Siegel and Challen Sievers. They all lived together in suburban Chicago largely due to Sievers’ father, Ron, whose construction firm renovated the house where the gymnasts lived and converted a former racquetball complex into the gym where they trained. They won silver at the 1995 Pan American Games in Mar del Plata, and placed second in the group at the 1995 Four Continents Championships.

In the summer of 1996 Aliane, Mandy James, Kate Nelson, Becky Turner, Brandi Siegel and Challen Sievers were selected to compete at the Olympic Games in Atlanta, the first edition to feature the group competition. They finished in 9th place and so did not advance to the final.

After her retirement Baquerot worked in Las Vegas with Cirque du Soleil, among her other performing credits. She married Olympic medalist Blaine Wilson, the couple were both performing on The Tour of Gymnastics Superstars, and after their stop in Sacramento, traveled to Reno, Nevada, and married there. Blaine and Aliane have two sons, Jackson and Bodhi. Alaine currently resides in Columbus where she works in her husband's gymnastics, cheerleading, and volleyball training facility, Integrity Athletics, in Plain City, Ohio.
