= Manuela Bocchini =

Italian rhythmic gymnast (born 1980)

Personal information
- Nationality: Italian
- Born: 26 July 1980 (age 45) Fano, Italy

Sport
- Sport: Rhythmic gymnastics

Manuela Bocchini (born 26 July 1980) is an Italian rhythmic gymnast. She competed in the women's group all-around event at the 1996 Summer Olympics.
