= Dana Carteleanu =

Romanian rhythmic gymnast

- Born: 18 December 1979 (age 46)

Gymnastics career
- Discipline: Rhythmic gymnastics
- Country represented: Romania
- Retired: yes
Medal record
Representing Romania
Rhythmic Gymnastics
Junior European Championships
Silver medal – second place	1993 Bucharest	Team

Giorgiana "Dana" Carteleanu (born 18 December 1979) is a Romanian rhythmic gymnast.

Stoica competed for Romania in the rhythmic gymnastics individual all-around competition at the 1996 Summer Olympics in Atlanta. There she was 32nd in the qualification and didn't advance to the semifinal.
