= Challen Sievers =

American rhythmic gymnast

- Full name: Challen Kelly Sievers
- Born: 19 April 1979 (age 47) Downers Grove, Illinois, U.S.

Gymnastics career
- Discipline: Rhythmic gymnastics
- Country represented: United States (1994–1996)
- Head coach: Rossitza Todorova
- Retired: yes
Medal record
Rhythmic gymnastics
Representing United States
Pan American Games
Silver medal – second place	1995 Mar del Plata	Group all-Around
Four Continents Championships
Silver medal – second place	1995 Cairo	Group All-Around

Challen Kelly Sievers (born 19 April 1979) is an American retired rhythmic gymnast. She was part of the national senior group.

== Biography ==
Challen began individual rhythmic gymnastics in 1987 and was a junior national champion in individual competition. She was on the US national rhythmic gymnastics team from 1994 to 1996, being part of the national senior group along Kate Nelson, Lori Fredreickson, Aliane Baquerot, Ginny Ledgerwood, Becky Turner, Brandi Siegel and Mandy James. They all lived together in suburban Chicago largely due to her father, Ron, whose construction firm renovated the house where the gymnasts lived and converted a former racquetball complex into the gym where they trained. They won silver at the 1995 Pan American Games in Mar del Plata, and placed second in the group at the 1995 Four Continents Championships.

In the summer of 1996 Mandy, Aliane Baquerot, Kate Nelson, Becky Turner, Brandi Siegel and Mandy James were selected to compete at the Olympic Games in Atlanta, the first edition to feature the group competition. They finished in 9th place and so did not advance to the final. After the Games her father bought the Olympic carpets that were competed on in Atlanta.
