= Huang Ting (gymnast) =

Chinese rhythmic gymnast

- Born: 2 July 1977 (age 49) China
- Height: 164 cm (5 ft 5 in)

Gymnastics career
- Discipline: Rhythmic gymnastics
- Country represented: China (?-1996)
- Retired: yes

Huang Ting (born 2 July 1977) is a retired Chinese rhythmic gymnast.

== Biography ==
In 1996 she competed in the Olympic Games in Atlanta, the first to feature the group event, as part of the group of China along Cai Yingying, Zhong Li, Zheng Ni and her twin Huang Ying. They were 6th in the qualifying round and 5th in the final behind Spain, Bulgaria, Russia and France.
