= Wu Bei =

Chinese rhythmic gymnast

- Born: December 22, 1979 (age 46)
- Height: 171 cm (5 ft 7 in) (at the 1996 Olympics)

Gymnastics career
- Discipline: Rhythmic gymnastics
- Country represented: China

Wu Bei (Chinese: 吳蓓; born December 22, 1979) is a Chinese rhythmic gymnast.

Wu competed for China in the rhythmic gymnastics individual all-around competition at the 1996 Summer Olympics in Atlanta. There she was 35th in the qualification round and didn't advance to the semifinal.
