= Mandy James =

American rhythmic gymnast (born 1978)

- Full name: Mandy Marie James
- Born: 9 December 1978 (age 47) Jacksonville, Florida, U.S.

Gymnastics career
- Discipline: Rhythmic gymnastics
- Country represented: United States (1995–1996)
- Head coach: Rossitza Todorova
- Retired: yes
Medal record
Rhythmic gymnastics
Representing United States
Pan American Games
Silver medal – second place	1995 Mar del Plata	Group all-Around
Four Continents Championships
Silver medal – second place	1995 Cairo	Group All-Around

Mandy Marie James (born 9 December 1978) is an American retired rhythmic gymnast and stuntwoman. She was part of the national senior group.

== Biography ==
She was on the US national rhythmic gymnastics team from 1995 to 1996, being part of the national senior group along Kate Nelson, Lori Fredreickson, Aliane Baquerot, Ginny Ledgerwood, Becky Turner, Brandi Siegel and Challen Sievers. They all lived together in suburban Chicago largely due to Sievers' father, Ron, whose construction firm renovated the house where the gymnasts lived and converted a former racquetball complex into the gym where they trained. They won silver at the 1995 Pan American Games in Mar del Plata, and placed second in the group at the 1995 Four Continents Championships.

In the summer of 1996 Mandy, Aliane Baquerot, Kate Nelson, Becky Turner, Brandi Siegel and Challen Sievers were selected to compete at the Olympic Games in Atlanta, the first edition to feature the group competition. They finished in 9th place and so did not advance to the final.

After her retirement James entered the film and television industry, where she worked as a stuntperson, appearing in multiple movies.
