= Alba Caride =

Spanish rhythmic gymnast

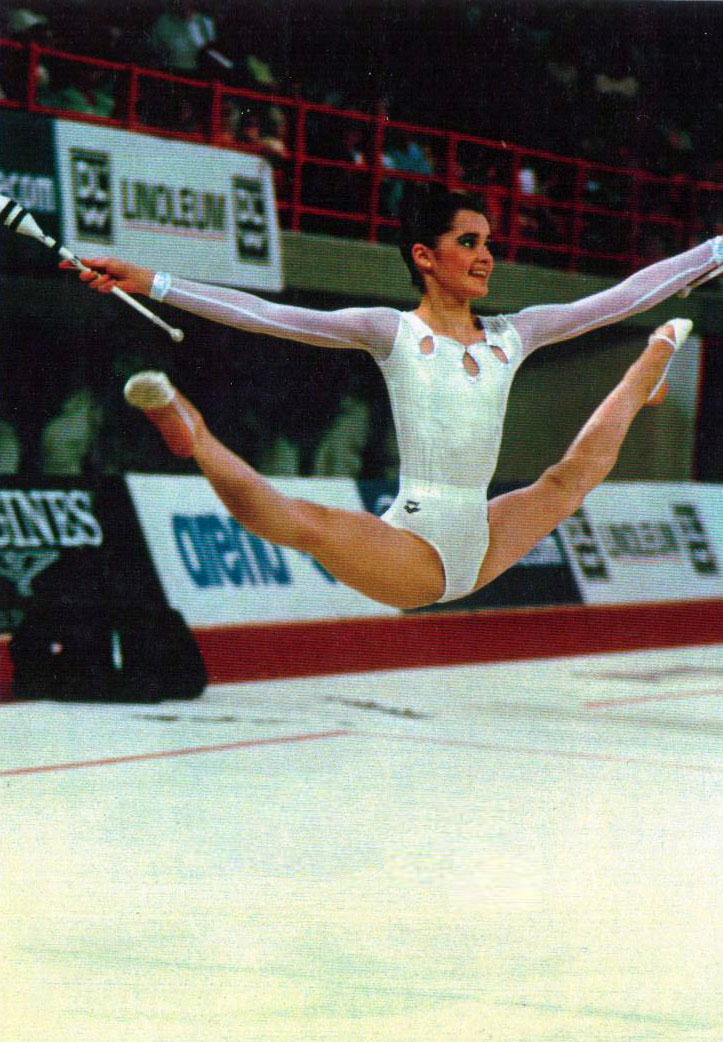

Personal information
- Full name: Alba Caride Costas
- Born: 24 April 1980 (age 46) Vigo, Pontevedra, Spain
- Height: 161 cm (5 ft 3 in) (at the 1996 Olympics)

Gymnastics career
- Discipline: Rhythmic gymnastics
- Country represented: Spain
- Club: Vallisoletano (ETG) Valladolid

Alba Caride Costas (Note: In this Spanish name, the first or paternal surname is Caride and the second or maternal family name is Costas.) (born 24 April 1980 in Vigo, Province of Pontevedra) is a Spanish rhythmic gymnast.

Caride competed for Spain in the rhythmic gymnastics individual all-around competition at the 1996 Summer Olympics in Atlanta. There she tied for 11th place in the qualification and advanced to the semifinal, in the semifinal she was 19th and didn't advance to the final of 10 competitors.
