= Friederike Arlt =

German gymnast (born 1984)

- Born: 7 September 1984 (age 41) Freiberg, East Germany
- Height: 168 cm (5 ft 6 in)

Gymnastics career
- Discipline: Rhythmic gymnastics
- Country represented: Germany
- Club: TV Wattenscheid
- Head coach: Carmen Weber
- Assistant coach: Livia Medilanski
- Retired: yes

Friederike Arlt (born 7 September 1984) is a German retired rhythmic gymnast. She represented her country in international competitions.

== Biography ==
Although born in Saarland, Arlt moved to Wattenscheid to better her chances of qualifying for the Olympic Games. Friederike and her teammates Selma Neuhaus, Susan Benicke, Jeanine Fissler, Jessica Schumacher and Selma Neuhaus achieved a surprising fourth place at the 2000 Sydney Olympics; this was the best ever rhythmic gymnastics result in German Olympic history.

After her retirement she studied medicine and is a specialist in ear, nose and throat medicine.
