= Alina Stoica =

Romanian rhythmic gymnast

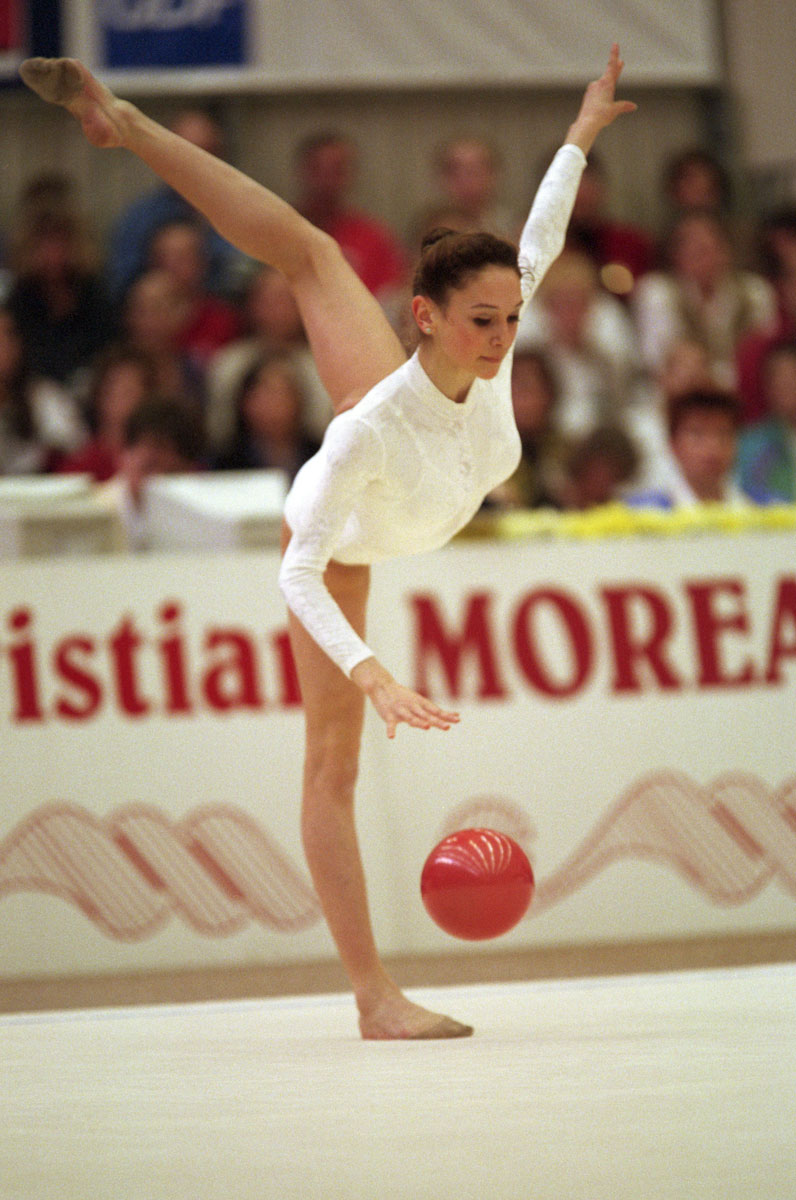

Personal information
- Full name: Alina Ramona Stoica
- Born: 18 January 1979 (age 47) Baia Mare, Maramureș, Romania
- Height: 170 cm (5 ft 7 in) (at the 1996 Olympics)

Gymnastics career
- Discipline: Rhythmic gymnastics
- Country represented: Romania
- Club: CSS 1. Baia Mare
- Former coach: Kando Rozalia
- Choreographer: Repede Horea
- Retired: yes
Medal record
Representing Romania
Rhythmic Gymnastics
Junior European Championships
Silver medal – second place	1993 Bucharest	Team

Alina Stoica (born 18 January 1979, Baia Mare) is a Romanian rhythmic gymnast.

Stoica competed for Romania in the rhythmic gymnastics individual all-around competition at the 1996 Summer Olympics in Atlanta. There she tied for 11th place in the qualification and advanced to the semifinal. In the semifinal she was 15th and didn't advance to the final of 10 competitors.
