= Kate Nelson =

American rhythmic gymnast

- Full name: Katherine O'Donnell Nelson
- Born: 27 December 1977 (age 48) Evanston, Illinois, U.S.

Gymnastics career
- Discipline: Rhythmic gymnastics
- Country represented: United States (1994–1996)
- Head coach: Rossitza Todorova
- Retired: yes
Medal record
Rhythmic gymnastics
Representing United States
Pan American Games
Silver medal – second place	1995 Mar del Plata	Group all-Around
Four Continents Championships
Silver medal – second place	1995 Cairo	Group All-Around

Katherine O'Donnell Nelson (born 27 December 1977), known as Kate Nelson, is an American retired rhythmic gymnast. She was part of the national senior group.

== Biography ==
Kate practiced ballet and tumbling getting her start in gymnastics at the YMCA, switching from artistic to rhythmic when she was 10–11 years old. Later she was on the US national rhythmic gymnastics team from 1994 to 1996, being part of the national senior group along Aliane Baquerot, Lori Fredreickson, Mandy James, Ginny Ledgerwood, Becky Turner, Brandi Siegel and Challen Sievers. They all lived together in suburban Chicago largely due to Sievers' father, Ron, whose construction firm renovated the house where the gymnasts lived and converted a former racquetball complex into the gym where they trained.

In 1994 the group was 19th at the World Championships in Paris. They won silver at the 1995 Pan American Games in Mar del Plata, and placed second in the group at the 1995 Four Continents Championships.

In the summer of 1996 Kate, Mandy James, Aliane Baquerot, Becky Turner, Brandi Siegel and Challen Sievers were selected to compete at the Olympic Games in Atlanta, the first edition to feature the group competition. They finished in 9th place and so did not advance to the final.

In 2012 she opened the YMCA National Championships and Summer Fest in Milwaukee. Nelson married and later settled in Buffalo Grove, Illinois, with her husband and two sons Will and Tyler.
