= Olga Shtyrenko =

Russian rhythmic gymnast (born 1977)

Medal record

Representing Russia

Women's Rhythmic gymnastics

Olympic Games
Bronze medal – third place	1996 Atlanta	Group All-around

Olga Aleksandrovna Shtyrenko (Russian: Ольга Александровна Штыренко, born 6 July 1977 in Volgograd, Soviet Union) is a Russian retired rhythmic gymnast. She won a bronze medal in the group competition at the 1996 Summer Olympics in Atlanta.
