= Katrin Hoffmann =

German rhythmic gymnast

Personal information
- Nationality: German
- Born: 5 July 1978 (age 47) Stuttgart, West Germany

Sport
- Sport: Rhythmic gymnastics

Katrin Hoffmann (born 5 July 1978) is a German rhythmic gymnast. She competed in the women's group all-around event at the 1996 Summer Olympics.
