= Irina Dzyuba =

Russian rhythmic gymnast (born 1980)

- Full name: Irina Yuryevna Dzyuba
- Born: 16 December 1980 (age 45) Novosibirsk, Soviet Union
- Height: 168 cm (5 ft 6 in)

Gymnastics career
- Discipline: Rhythmic gymnastics
- Country represented: Russia
- Club: Spartak
- Retired: yes
Medal record
Representing Russia
Women's Rhythmic gymnastics
Olympic Games
Bronze medal – third place	1996 Atlanta	Group All-around

Irina Yuryevna Dzyuba (Russian: Ирина Юрьевна Дзюба; born 16 December 1980 in Novosibirsk) is a Russian former rhythmic gymnast. She won bronze in the group competition at the 1996 Summer Olympics in Atlanta.
