= Anne Jung =

German rhythmic gymnast

Personal information
- Nationality: German
- Born: 21 August 1981 (age 44) Groß-Umstadt, West Germany

Sport
- Sport: Rhythmic gymnastics

Anne Jung (born 21 August 1981) is a German rhythmic gymnast. She competed in the women's group all-around event at the 1996 Summer Olympics.

In 1998 she competing at the World Championships in Seville along with Selma Neuhaus, Jeanine Fissler, Anna Nölder, Susan Benike and Ellen Jackël, they finished 14th in the All-Around and 8th with 6 balls.
