= Luise Stäblein =

German rhythmic gymnast

Personal information
- Nationality: German
- Born: 15 September 1980 (age 45) Berlin, Germany

Sport
- Sport: Rhythmic gymnastics

Luise Stäblein (born 15 September 1980) is a German rhythmic gymnast. She competed in the women's group all-around event at the 1996 Summer Olympics.
