= Angelina Yushkova =

Russian rhythmic gymnast (born 1979)

Medal record

Representing Russia

Women's Rhythmic gymnastics

Olympic Games
Bronze medal – third place	1996 Atlanta	Group All-around

Angelina Nikolayevna Yushkova (Russian: Ангелина Николаевна Юшкова) (born 13 November 1979 in Voronezh) is a Russian gymnast. She competed at the 1996 Summer Olympics in Atlanta where she received a bronze medal in the rhythmic group competition.
