= Yelena Krivoshey =

Russian rhythmic gymnast (born 1977)

Medal record

Representing Russia

Women's Rhythmic gymnastics

Olympic Games
Bronze medal – third place	1996 Atlanta	Group All-around

Yelena Anatolyevna Krivoshey (Russian: Елена Анатольевна Кривошей, born 1 February 1977 in Volgograd, Soviet Union) is a Russian former rhythmic gymnast. She won bronze in the group competition at the 1996 Summer Olympics in Atlanta.
