= Yevgeniya Bochkaryova =

Russian gymnast (born 1980)

- Full name: Yevgeniya Aleksandrovna Bochkaryova
- Born: June 10, 1980 (age 46) Penza, Soviet Union
- Height: 160 cm (5 ft 3 in)

Gymnastics career
- Discipline: Rhythmic gymnastics
- Country represented: Russia
- Club: Dynamo
Medal record
Representing Russia
Women's Rhythmic gymnastics
Olympic Games
Bronze medal – third place	1996 Atlanta	Group All-around
World Championships
Silver medal – second place	1996 Budapest	5 Hoops
Silver medal – second place	1996 Budapest	3 Balls + 2 Ribbons
Bronze medal – third place	1995 Vienna	3 Balls + 2 Ribbons

Yevgeniya Aleksandrovna Bochkaryova (born June 10, 1980, Penza, USSR) is a Russian athlete, represented rhythmic gymnastics in team exercises. Bronze medalist at the 1996 Summer Olympics in team exercises. Honoured Master of Sports of Russia in rhythmic gymnastics (1996). She was awarded Medal of the Order "For Merit to the Fatherland" II degree.

== Biography ==
Yevgeniya Bochkaryova trained at the Penza Regional Specialized Children and Youth School of the Olympic Reserve in rhythmic gymnastics. In 1993, at the European Youth Cup, she won silver and bronze medals. At the Rhythmic Gymnastics World Championships 1995 Yevgeniya won a bronze medal, and in Rhythmic Gymnastics World Championships 1996 she won silver and bronze medals. In 1996, as part of the Russian national gymnastics team under the leadership of Marina Vasilievna Fateeva Yevgeniya Bochkaryova won the bronze medal in the 1996 Summer Olympics in group exercises. In the same year she was awarded the title of Honoured Master of Sports of the Russian Federation. Yevgeniya graduated from the Faculty of Physical Education Penza State University in 2002.

In 2021, Oleg Melnichenko, Governor of the Penza Region, was appointed Minister of Physical Culture and Sports of the Penza Region.
