= Yuliya Ivanova (rhythmic gymnast) =

Russian rhythmic gymnast (born 1977)

- Full name: Yuliya Viktorovna Ivanova
- Born: 5 December 1977 (age 48) Volgograd, Russian SFSR, Soviet Union

Gymnastics career
- Discipline: Rhythmic gymnastics
- Country represented: Russia
Medal record
Women's rhythmic gymnastics
Representing Russia
Olympic Games
Bronze medal – third place	1996 Atlanta	Group all-around
World Championships
Gold medal – first place	1994 Paris	Group all-around

Yuliya Viktorovna Ivanova (Russian: Юлия Викторовна Иванова, born 5 December 1977) is a Russian former rhythmic gymnast. She won a bronze medal in the group competition at the 1996 Summer Olympics in Atlanta.

In group all-around competition, Ivanova also won a gold medal at the 1994 World Rhythmic Gymnastics Championships in Paris and finished in fourth place at the 1996 World Rhythmic Gymnastics Championships in Budapest.
