= Katharina Wildermut =

German rhythmic gymnast

Personal information
- Nationality: German
- Born: 17 April 1979 (age 46) Halle (Saale), East Germany

Sport
- Sport: Rhythmic gymnastics

Katharina Wildermut (born 17 April 1979) is a German rhythmic gymnast. She competed in the women's group all-around event at the 1996 Summer Olympics.
