= Huang Ying (gymnast) =

Chinese rhythmic gymnast

Huang Ying (黄莹, born 2 July 1977) is a retired Chinese rhythmic gymnast. She represented China at the 1996 Summer Olympics.

Her twin sister Huang Ting was also a member of the group.
