= Ivelina Taleva =

Bulgarian rhythmic gymnast (born 1977)

- Ивелина Талева
- Born: 25 March 1977 (age 49) Plovdiv, Bulgaria
- Height: 1.75 m (5 ft 9 in)

Gymnastics career
Medal record
Women's rhythmic gymnastics
Representing Bulgaria
Olympic Games
Silver medal – second place	1996 Atlanta	All-around
World Championships
Gold medal – first place	1994 Paris	4 Hoops + 2 Clubs
Gold medal – first place	1995 Vienna	All-around
Gold medal – first place	1995 Vienna	5 Hoops
Gold medal – first place	1996 Budapest	All-around
Silver medal – second place	1991 Athens	6 Ribbons
Silver medal – second place	1994 Paris	6 Ropes
Silver medal – second place	1995 Vienna	3 Balls + 2 Ribbons
Bronze medal – third place	1994 Paris	All-around
European Championships
Gold medal – first place	1993 Bucharest	4 Hoops + 2 Clubs
Gold medal – first place	1995 Prague	3 Balls + 2 Ribbons
Silver medal – second place	1992 Stuttgart	6 Ribbons
Silver medal – second place	1993 Bucharest	All-around
Silver medal – second place	1993 Bucharest	6 Ropes
Silver medal – second place	1995 Prague	All-around
Silver medal – second place	1995 Prague	5 Hoops
Bronze medal – third place	1991 Lisbon	All-around

Ivelina Taleva (Bulgarian: Ивелина Талева, born 25 March 1977) is a Bulgarian former group rhythmic gymnast. She is the 1996 Summer Olympics silver medalist, a two-time World champion (1995, 1996), and a two-time European silver medalist. She now works as a coach.

== Biography ==
Taleva was born in Plovdiv. She began rhythmic gymnastics in 1984 and competed for the Trakiya club in her hometown until 1990, when she moved to the Levski club in Sofia.

In 1991, she became a member of the national group. She would remain a member through 1996. She won her first medals with the group that year when she competed at the 1991 European Championships, where they won the all-around bronze medal, and the World Championships, where they were fourth in the all-around and did not reach the mixed apparatus final but won silver in the 6 ribbons final.

The next year, Taleva and the group competed at the 1992 European Championships. They had a poor mixed apparatus routine that left them in seventh place in the all-around, but they again won the silver medal in the 6 ribbons final. At the World Championships, they instead had a poor 6 ribbons routine and finished 15th in the all-around, but they reached the 3 ropes + 2 balls final, where they were fourth.

In 1993, Taleva won her first European gold medal when the group finished first in the 4 hoops + 2 pairs of clubs final, tied with the Russian group. They also won silver in the all-around and 6 ropes final. The next year, at the 1994 World Championships, they won bronze in the all-around and a gold and silver in the event finals.

Groups were reduced to five members in 1995, and Taleva remained with the national group. She won a second European all-around silver medal that year, along with gold and another silver in the finals. At the World Championships, she became a world champion with her fellow group members. They won a second gold as well as a silver in the finals.

The group won a second world title at the 1996 World Championships in June 1996. That August, they competed at the 1996 Summer Olympics in Atlanta. They qualified for the group final in first place, and they won the silver medal in the final.

Taleva graduated from the National Sports Academy "Vasil Levski". She coached at the Levski club until 2010, when she moved to coach in Italy.
