= 1995 Rhythmic Gymnastics European Championships =

- Location: Prague, Czech Republic
- Start date: 06 July 1995
- End date: 9 July 1995

The 1995 Rhythmic Gymnastics European Championships is the 11th edition of the Rhythmic Gymnastics European Championships, which took place from 6 July to 9 July in Prague, Czech Republic.

== Medal winners ==
Event	Gold	Silver	Bronze
Team Competition
Team	Russia; Yelena Shalamova; Anna Chichova; Viktoria Anikina	Belarus; Yulia Raskina; Valeria Vatkina; Anna Glazkova	Bulgaria; Teodora Alexandrova; Borislava Ilieva
Junior Individual
All-Around	Teodora Alexandrova; Bulgaria; Valeria Vatkina; Belarus	Elena Chalamova; Russia	None awarded
Rope	Elena Chalamova; Russia	Teodora Alexandrova; Bulgaria	Anna Chichova; Russia
Hoop	Teodora Alexandrova; Bulgaria; Elena Chalamova; Russia	None awarded	Anna Chichova; Russia
Clubs	Elena Chalamova; Russia	Teodora Alexandrova; Bulgaria	Yulia Raskina; Belarus
Ribbon	Elena Chalamova; Russia	Teodora Alexandrova; Bulgaria; Valeria Vatkina; Belarus	None awarded
Senior Groups
All-Around	Russia	Bulgaria	Spain; Marta Baldó; Nuria Cabanillas; Estela Giménez; Tania Lamarca; Estíbaliz Martínez; María Pardo; Maider Esparza
5 Hoops	Russia	Bulgaria	Spain; Marta Baldó; Nuria Cabanillas; Estela Giménez; Tania Lamarca; María Pardo
3 Balls + 2 Ribbons	Bulgaria	Spain; Marta Baldó; Nuria Cabanillas; Estela Giménez; Tania Lamarca; Estíbaliz Martínez; María Pardo	France; Charlotte Camboulives; Caroline Chimot; Sylvie Didone; Audrey Grosclaude; Frédérique Léhon; Nadia Mimoun

== Medal table ==
Rank	Nation	Gold	Silver	Bronze	Total
1	Russia (RUS)	7	1	2	10
2	Bulgaria (BUL)	3	5	1	9
3	Belarus (BLR)	1	2	1	4
4	Spain (ESP)	0	1	2	3
5	France (FRA)	0	0	1	1
Totals (5 entries)		11	9	7	27
