= Vyara Vatashka =

Bulgarian rhythmic gymnast

- Вяра Ваташка
- Born: 20 February 1980 (age 46) Sofia, Bulgaria

Gymnastics career
- Discipline: Rhythmic gymnastics
Medal record
Women's rhythmic gymnastics
Representing Bulgaria
Olympic Games
Silver medal – second place	1996 Atlanta	Group All-around

Vyara Vatashka (also spelled Viara Vatashka, Bulgarian: Вяра Ваташка; 20 February 1980, Sofia, Bulgaria) is a Bulgarian former group rhythmic gymnast. She is the 1996 Summer Olympics silver medalist and a two-time all-around World champion, and she now works as a coach.

== Biography ==
Vatashka joined the national group in 1995 and was a member for two years. During her short time in the group, she won two World titles with her teammates.

At the 1995 European Championships, the group won the silver medal in the all-around, then another silver in the 5 hoops final and a gold in the mixed apparatus final. Later that year, they won the World Championships all-around and won two more medals in the finals, another gold (5 hoops) and silver (3 balls + 2 ribbons).

In 1996, Vatashka and her teammates won a second World Championships in June, though they performed poorly in both event finals. Two months later, in August, they competed at the 1996 Summer Olympics. They qualified to the final in first place and won the silver medal in the final. They lost the title to the Spanish group by a slim margin of 0.067 points, which Vatashka said was disappointing, but that they were still proud to have won silver, especially since it was the debut year of rhythmic groups at the Olympics.

Vatashka graduated from the National Sports Academy "Vasil Levski" and became a coach at the Slavia club. In 2017, she was chosen as the coach of the junior national group, with Tsvetelina Naydenova as the assistant coach. She held the position for four years. During her tenure, the junior group won all three silver medals at the 2021 European Championships.
