= Ina Deltcheva =

Bulgarian rhythmic gymnast (born 1977)

- Alternative name: Ina Delcheva
- Born: 20 July 1977 (age 49) Plovdiv, Bulgaria
- Height: 1.68 m (5 ft 6 in)

Gymnastics career
- Discipline: Rhythmic gymnastics
- Country represented: Bulgaria
Medal record
Representing Bulgaria
Women's Rhythmic gymnastics
Olympic Games
Silver medal – second place	1996 Atlanta	Group all-around
World Championships
Gold medal – first place	1996 Budapest	Group all-around
Bronze medal – third place	1994 Paris	Group all-around

Ina Deltcheva (Bulgarian: Ина Делчева; born 20 July 1977 in Plovdiv; alternate transliteration: Ina Delcheva) is a Bulgarian retired group rhythmic gymnast. She won a silver medal in the group all-around at the 1996 Summer Olympics, and she also won medals at the World and European championships.

== Career ==
Deltcheva began gymnastics in 1983 and competed for the Trakia club in her hometown of Plovdiv. She joined the national team in 1992, and she began competing with the senior national group in 1993.

At her first major competition with the group, the 1993 European Championships, she became the silver all-around medalist. In the event finals, they won a second silver medal with 6 ropes and a gold medal with 4 hoops + 2 pairs of clubs.

The next season, she competed at her first World Championships. There, the group won bronze in the all-around. They again won silver in the 6 ropes final and won gold in the mixed apparatus final.

In 1995, she won a silver all-around medal with the group at the 1995 European Championships, where they also won another silver with 5 hoops and won gold with 3 balls + 2 ribbons. Later that year, at the 1995 World Championships, they became all-around World champions.

She last competed in 1996. At the 1996 World Championships, held in June, they won a second World title in the all-around, though they placed in neither event final. In August, at the 1996 Summer Olympics in Atlanta, she and her teammates became the silver Olympic medalists.

Deltcheva graduated from the National Sports Academy "Vasil Levski".
