= Gymnastics at the 1996 Summer Olympics – Women's rhythmic group all-around =

Women's rhythmic group all-around at the Games of the XXVI Olympiad

Medalists
1st place, gold medalist(s)		Marta Baldó; Nuria Cabanillas; Estela Giménez; Lorena Guréndez; Tania Lamarca; Estíbaliz Martínez	Spain
2nd place, silver medalist(s)		Ina Deltcheva; Valentina Kevlian; Maria Koleva; Maja Tabakova; Ivelina Taleva; Viara Vatashka	Bulgaria
3rd place, bronze medalist(s)		Yevgeniya Bochkaryova; Irina Dzyuba; Yuliya Ivanova; Yelena Krivoshey; Olga Shtyrenko; Angelina Yushkova	Russia

These are the results of the rhythmic group all-around competition, one of the two events of the rhythmic gymnastics discipline contested in the gymnastics at the 1996 Summer Olympics in Athens, Georgia.

== Background ==
The rhythmic group event was contested for the first time at these Games. The Bulgarian group were the reigning World champions going into the event.

== Event format ==
Each group performed two routines in both the preliminary and final rounds, one with 5 hoops, one with 3 balls and two ribbons. "New life" scoring was used, meaning that scores from the qualification round did not carry over to the finals.

== Qualification ==
Nine teams participated in the first round. The top six teams would go on to the final round.

Rank	Team	5	3 + 2	Total	Qual.
1	Bulgaria	19.466 (3)	19.550 (1)	39.016	Q
2	Spain	19.500 (2)	19.466 (2)	38.966	Q
3	Russia	19.516 (1)	19.366 (3)	38.882	Q
4	Belarus	19.300 (4)	19.133 (4)	38.433	Q
5	France	19.200 (6)	19.033 (5)	38.233	Q
6	China	19.133 (7)	18.999 (6)	38.132	Q
7	Italy	19.283 (5)	18.733 (8)	38.016	-
8	Germany	19.050 (8)	18.832 (7)	37.882	-
9	United States	18.400 (9)	18.233 (9)	36.633	-

== Final ==
Spain won the final, and the first Olympic gold ever given in the event, over Bulgaria, which was considered a minor upset.

Rank	Team	5	3 + 2	Total
1st place, gold medalist(s)	Spain	19.483 (1)	19.450 (=1)	38.933
2nd place, silver medalist(s)	Bulgaria	19.416 (3)	19.450 (=1)	38.866
3rd place, bronze medalist(s)	Russia	19.466 (2)	18.899 (4)	38.365
4	France	19.149 (6)	19.050 (3)	38.199
5	China	19.199 (5)	18.800 (5)	37.999
6	Belarus	19.266 (4)	18.716 (6)	37.982
