= Gymnastics at the 1996 Summer Olympics – Women's rhythmic individual all-around =

Women's rhythmic individual all-around at the Games of the XXVI Olympiad
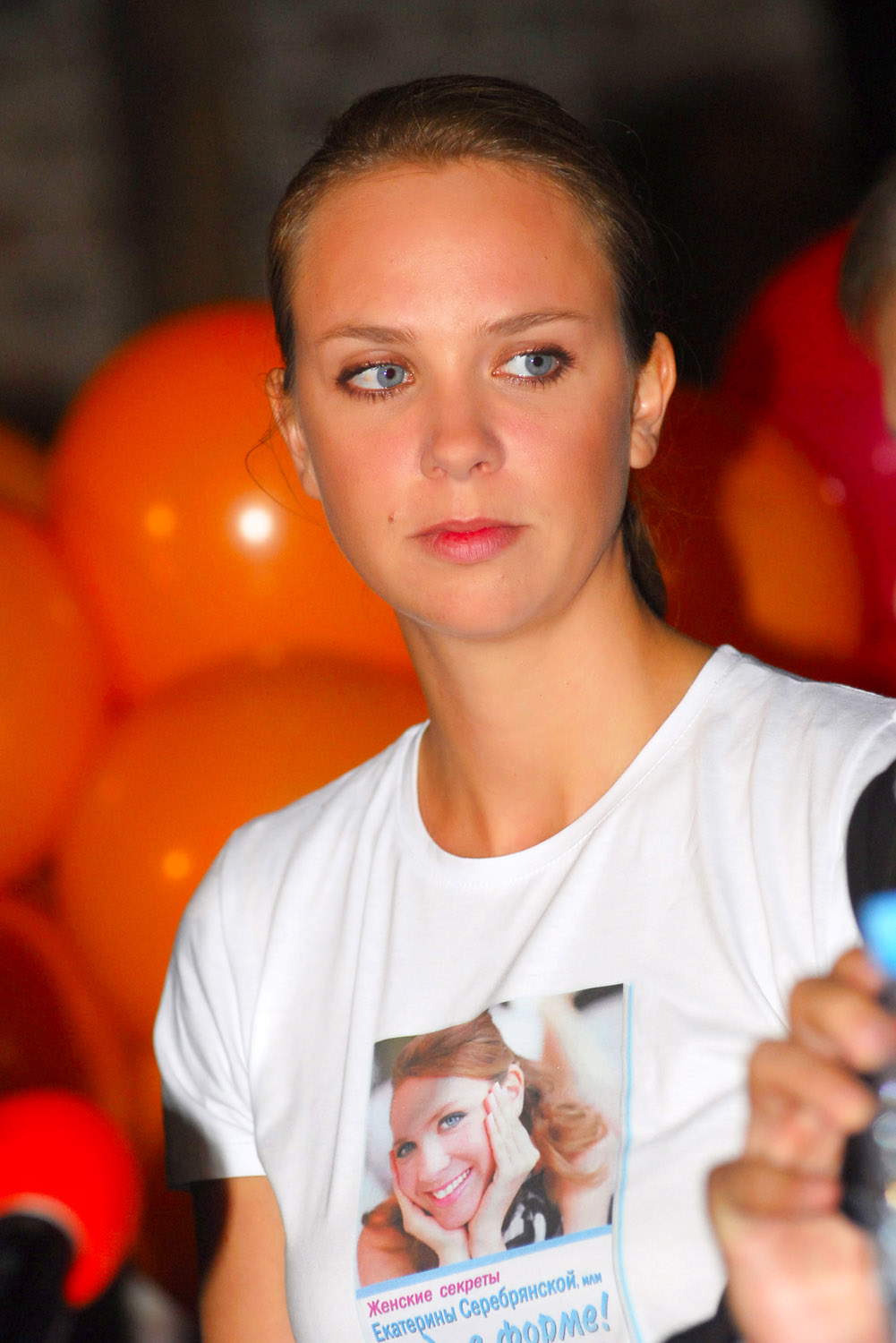
- Gold medalist Ekaterina Serebrianskaya (2007)
- Date: August 1–4, 1996

Medalists
1st place, gold medalist(s)		Ekaterina Serebrianskaya	Ukraine
2nd place, silver medalist(s)		Yanina Batyrchina	Russia
3rd place, bronze medalist(s)		Elena Vitrichenko	Ukraine

These are the results of the rhythmic team all-around competition, one of the two events of the rhythmic gymnastics discipline contested at the 1996 Summer Olympics.

== Background ==
The competitors at the event included the reigning co-World champions, Kateryna Serebrianska and Maria Petrova.

== Event format ==
The event used "new life" scoring, meaning that scores were not carried over from qualifications to the final round. 5 points were given for composition and 5 for execution for a maximum score of 10.0, though judges were instructed to avoid "perfect" scores and ties.

== Scoring controversies ==
Multiple competitors, including fifth-place Maria Petrova, bronze medalist Olena Vitrychenko - the only gymnast to complete all 12 routines without dropping her apparatus - and gold medalist Kateryna Serebrianska expressed a belief that their scores were not based only on their performances but political favor with the judges. Of the thirty-seven competitors in the preliminary round, two earned exactly the same score for all four routines, and twenty-six more received scores within 0.10 points for each routine.

== Results ==
In the first round, there were thirty-seven competitors. From that thirty-seven, the highest scoring twenty would go on to the next round. From that twenty, the highest scoring ten would go on to the final round.

Rank	Name	Nation	Rope (rhythmic gymnastics)	Ball (rhythmic gymnastics)	Clubs (rhythmic gymnastics)	Ribbon (rhythmic gymnastics)	Total
1st place, gold medalist(s)	Ekaterina Serebrianskaya	Ukraine	9.950 (1)	9.950 (1)	9.950 (1)	9.833 (1)	39.683
2nd place, silver medalist(s)	Yanina Batyrchina	Russia	9.850 (3)	9.916 (2)	9.933 (2)	9.683 (7)	39.382
3rd place, bronze medalist(s)	Elena Vitrichenko	Ukraine	9.866 (2)	9.800 (4)	9.849 (3)	9.816 (3)	39.331
4	Amina Zaripova	Russia	9.783 (4)	9.866 (3)	9.783 (4)	9.832 (2)	39.265
5	Maria Petrova	Bulgaria	9.733 (5)	9.783 (5)	9.733 (5)	9.750 (=4)	39.000
6	Eva Serrano	France	9.683 (7)	9.700 (7)	9.700 (=6)	9.733 (6)	38.817
7	Larissa Lukyanenko	Belarus	9.466 (10)	9.750 (6)	9.700 (=6)	9.750 (=4)	38.666
8	Tatiana Ogrizko	Belarus	9.583 (8)	9.682 (8)	9.599 (9)	9.666 (8)	38.530
9	Almudena Cid	Spain	9.700 (6)	9.566 (10)	9.683 (8)	9.566 (10)	38.515
10	Magdalena Brzeska	Germany	9.516 (9)	9.600 (9)	9.566 (10)	9.633 (9)	38.315
