= Sport in Spain =

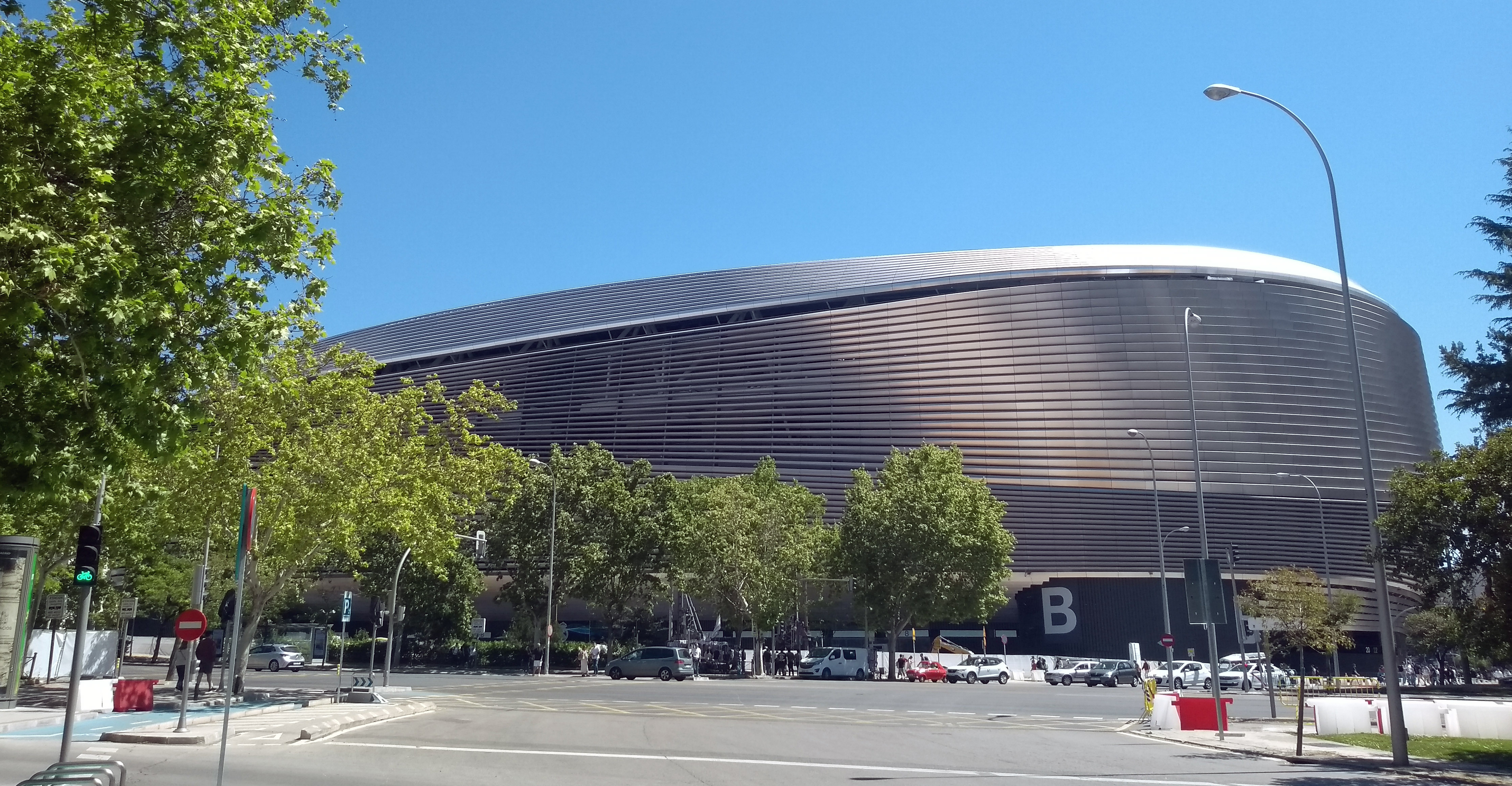
The Santiago Bernabéu Stadium, often regarded as one of the most important stadiums in Spain.

Sport in Spain has been highly successful through the late 20th century and early 21st century, in a wide variety of disciplines. The most popular and high profile sport in Spain is football. Other sports in which Spain is prolific include tennis, basketball, cycling, padel, handball, rugby union, rally, motorcycling, judo, Formula One, water sports, dancing, rhythmic gymnastics, bullfighting, golf, and skiing.

High profile Spanish sporting achievements of the 21st century include: Rafael Nadal's 22 major singles titles in tennis; Carlos Alcaraz's 7 major singles titles in tennis; six Davis Cup victories; team victories at the 2006 and the 2019 World Basketball Championships; the FIBA EuroBasket in 2009, 2011, 2015 and 2022; Fernando Alonso's 2005 and 2006 championships in Formula One; twelve premier class titles in MotoGP, led by Marc Márquez with seven; and Óscar Pereiro, Alberto Contador and Carlos Sastre's 2006, 2007, 2008 and 2009 triumphs in the Tour de France. The Spanish men's football team won the Euros in 2008, 2012, and 2024, alongside the 2010 FIFA World Cup and 2026 FIFA World Cup, and the women's team won the 2023 FIFA Women's World Cup. Success has also continued for historic Spanish football clubs such as Real Madrid and FC Barcelona. Some observers have claimed that Spain is enjoying something of a sporting "Golden Age" similar to the Spanish 17th century achievements in painting and literature.

Spain has also hosted many major international sporting events, such as the 1992 Summer Olympics in Barcelona and the 1982 FIFA World Cup. Spain will host the 2030 FIFA World Cup alongside co-hosts Morocco and Portugal.

== Popularity ==
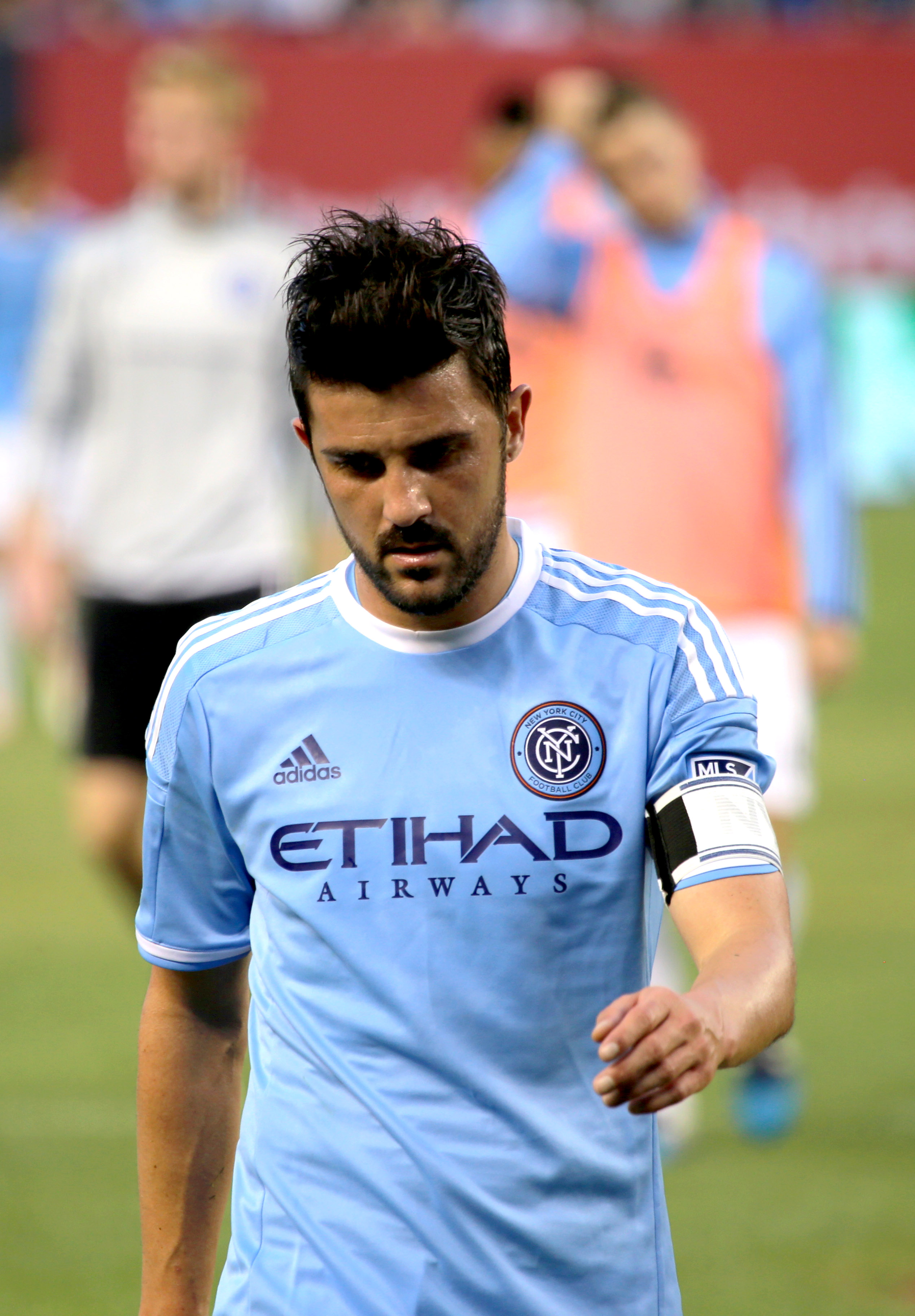
David Villa, one of the most successful and celebrated Spanish footballers of his generation.

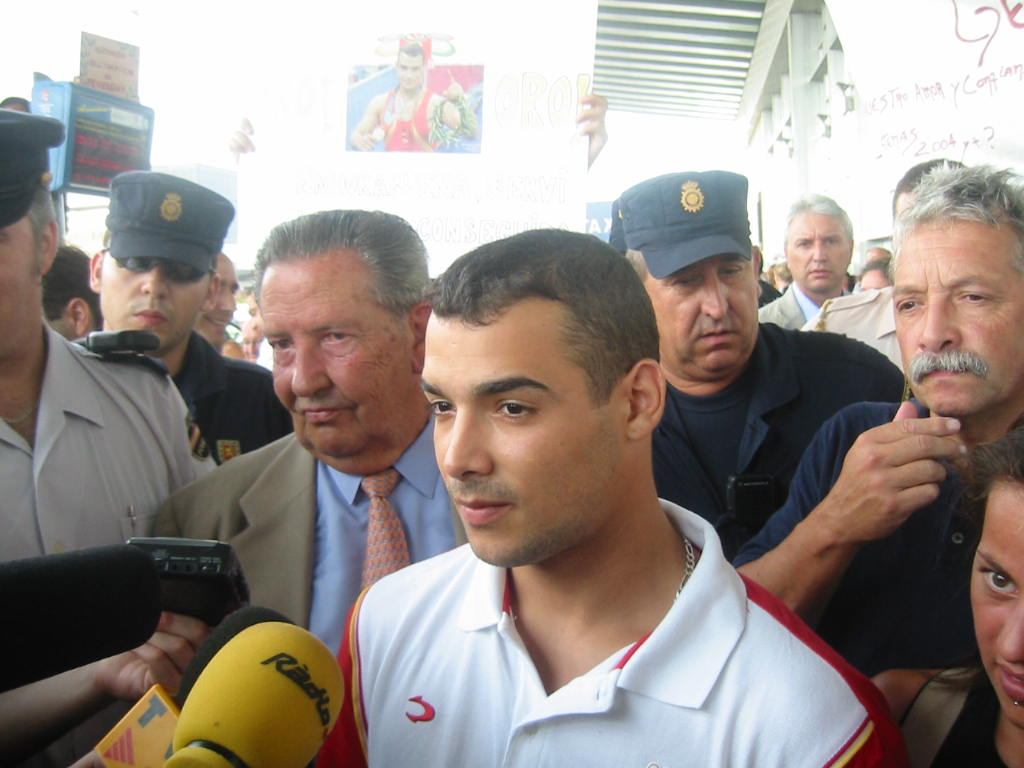
Gervasio Deferr, three-time Olympic medalist who made significant contributions to Spanish gymnastics during his career.

In 2014, the Centro de Investigaciones Sociológicas (CIS) asked which sport or sports people in Spain participated in and which ones they were particularly interested in, even if they did not practice them. Allowing the respondent to give 3 answers to each question.

Sports Participation and Interest
Sport	Participating	Interested In
Gym	29.3%	10.7%
Cycling	19.5%	11.1%
Swimming	17%	11.9%
Football	14.9%	48%
Athletics	7.6%	5.7%
Basketball	5.1%	17.1%
Futsal	4.3%	2.1%
Tennis	4.1%	21.6%
Winter sports	2.7%	1.7%
Motorcycle racing	0.9%	10.5%
Auto racing	0.4%	8.4%
Mountaineering	11.4%	3.8%
Skating	1.1%	3.6%
Handball	0.1%	2.6%
Nothing	NA	12.7%

As of 2022, padel is the second most popular participation sport in Spain behind football. As of 2022, there were five million players in Spain and more than 20,000 courts.

== Host of events ==
=== Big events ===
- 1992 Summer Olympics in Barcelona
- 1982 FIFA World Cup
- 1999 World Athletics Championships in Seville
- 2030 FIFA World Cup with Morocco and Portugal

=== World championships ===
Olympic sports

Competition	Sport	Place
2005 World Archery Championships	Archery	Madrid
1986 FIBA World Championship	Basketball	
2014 FIBA Basketball World Cup	Basketball	
2018 FIBA Women's Basketball World Cup	Basketball	Canary Islands
1999 ICF Canoe Slalom World Championships	Canoeing	La Seu d'Urgell
2002 ICF Canoe Sprint World Championships	Canoeing	Seville
2013 World Aquatics Championships	Cycling	Barcelona
1965 UCI Road World Championships	Cycling	San Sebastián
1965 UCI Track Cycling World Championships	Cycling	San Sebastián
1973 UCI Road World Championships	Cycling	Barcelona
1973 UCI Track Cycling World Championships	Cycling	San Sebastián
1984 UCI Track Cycling World Championships	Cycling	Barcelona
1992 UCI Road World Championships	Cycling	Benidorm
1992 UCI Track Cycling World Championships	Cycling	Valencia
1997 UCI Road World Championships	Cycling	San Sebastián
2000 UCI Mountain Bike & Trials World Championships	Cycling	Sierra Nevada
2005 UCI Road World Championships	Cycling	Madrid
2007 UCI Track Cycling World Championships	Cycling	Palma
2014 UCI Road World Championships	Cycling	Ponferrada
2002 FEI World Equestrian Games	Equestrian	Jerez de la Frontera
1985 World Fencing Championships	Fencing	Barcelona
1971 Men's Hockey World Cup	Field hockey	Barcelona
1978 Women's Hockey World Cup	Field hockey	Madrid
2006 Women's Hockey World Cup	Field hockey	Madrid
1975 World Rhythmic Gymnastics Championships	Gymnastics	Madrid
1985 World Rhythmic Gymnastics Championships	Gymnastics	Valladolid
1993 World Rhythmic Gymnastics Championships	Gymnastics	Alicante
2001 World Rhythmic Gymnastics Championships	Gymnastics	Madrid
2023 World Rhythmic Gymnastics Championships	Gymnastics	Valencia
2025 World Trampoline Gymnastics Championships	Gymnastics	Pamplona
2013 World Men's Handball Championship	Handball	
2021 World Women's Handball Championship	Handball	
1991 World Judo Championships	Judo	Barcelona
2002 World Rowing Championships	Rowing	Seville
2004 World Rowing Championships	Rowing	Banyoles
2003 ISAF Sailing World Championships	Sailing	Cádiz
2014 ISAF Sailing World Championships	Sailing	Santander
FIS Alpine World Ski Championships 1996	Skiing	Granada
1986 World Aquatics Championships	Swimming	Madrid
2013 World Aquatics Championships	Swimming	Barcelona
2005 World Taekwondo Championships	Taekwondo	Madrid

Other sports

Competition	Sport	Place
1952 Basque Pelota World Championships	Basque Pelota	San Sebastián
1962 Basque Pelota World Championships	Basque Pelota	Pamplona
1970 Basque Pelota World Championships	Basque Pelota	San Sebastián
1986 Basque Pelota World Championships	Basque Pelota	Vitoria-Gasteiz
2002 Basque Pelota World Championships	Basque Pelota	Pamplona
2018 Basque Pelota World Championships	Basque Pelota	Barcelona
World Chess Championship 1987	Chess	Seville
1985 AMF Futsal Men's World Cup	Futsal	
1996 FIFA Futsal World Championship	Futsal	
2008 AMF Futsal Women's World Cup	Futsal	Catalonia
2017 AMF Futsal Women's World Cup	Futsal	Catalonia
1992 Padel World Championship	Padel	Madrid
1996 Padel World Championship	Padel	Madrid
2006 Padel World Championship	Padel	Murcia
2012 Padel World Championship	Padel	Barcelona
2013 Padel World Championship	Padel	Bilbao
2014 Padel World Championship	Padel	Palma de Mallorca
2015 Padel World Championship	Padel	Málaga
1951 Roller Hockey World Cup	Roller hockey	Barcelona
1954 Roller Hockey World Cup	Roller hockey	Barcelona
1960 Roller Hockey World Cup	Roller hockey	Madrid
1964 Roller Hockey World Cup	Roller hockey	Barcelona
1972 Roller Hockey World Cup	Roller hockey	A Coruña
1976 Roller Hockey World Cup	Roller hockey	Oviedo
1988 Roller Hockey World Cup	Roller hockey	A Coruña
1999 Rink Hockey World Championship	Roller hockey	Reus
2009 Rink Hockey World Championship	Roller hockey	Vigo
2010 FIRS Women's Roller Hockey World Cup	Roller hockey	Alcobendas
2019 Roller Hockey World Cup	Roller hockey	Barcelona
2019 Women's Roller Hockey World Cup	Roller hockey	Barcelona
2002 Women's Rugby World Cup	Rugby	Catalonia
1987 World Taekwondo Championships	Taekwondo	Barcelona

=== Spanish sports calendar ===
The following are major sporting events held annually in Spain:

- Vuelta Ciclista a España
- Volta a Catalunya
- Euskal Herriko Itzulia (Tour of Basque Country)
- Emakumeen Euskal Bira
- Clásica de San Sebastián
- Spanish Grand Prix
- Rally de Catalunya

== Main team sports ==
=== Football ===
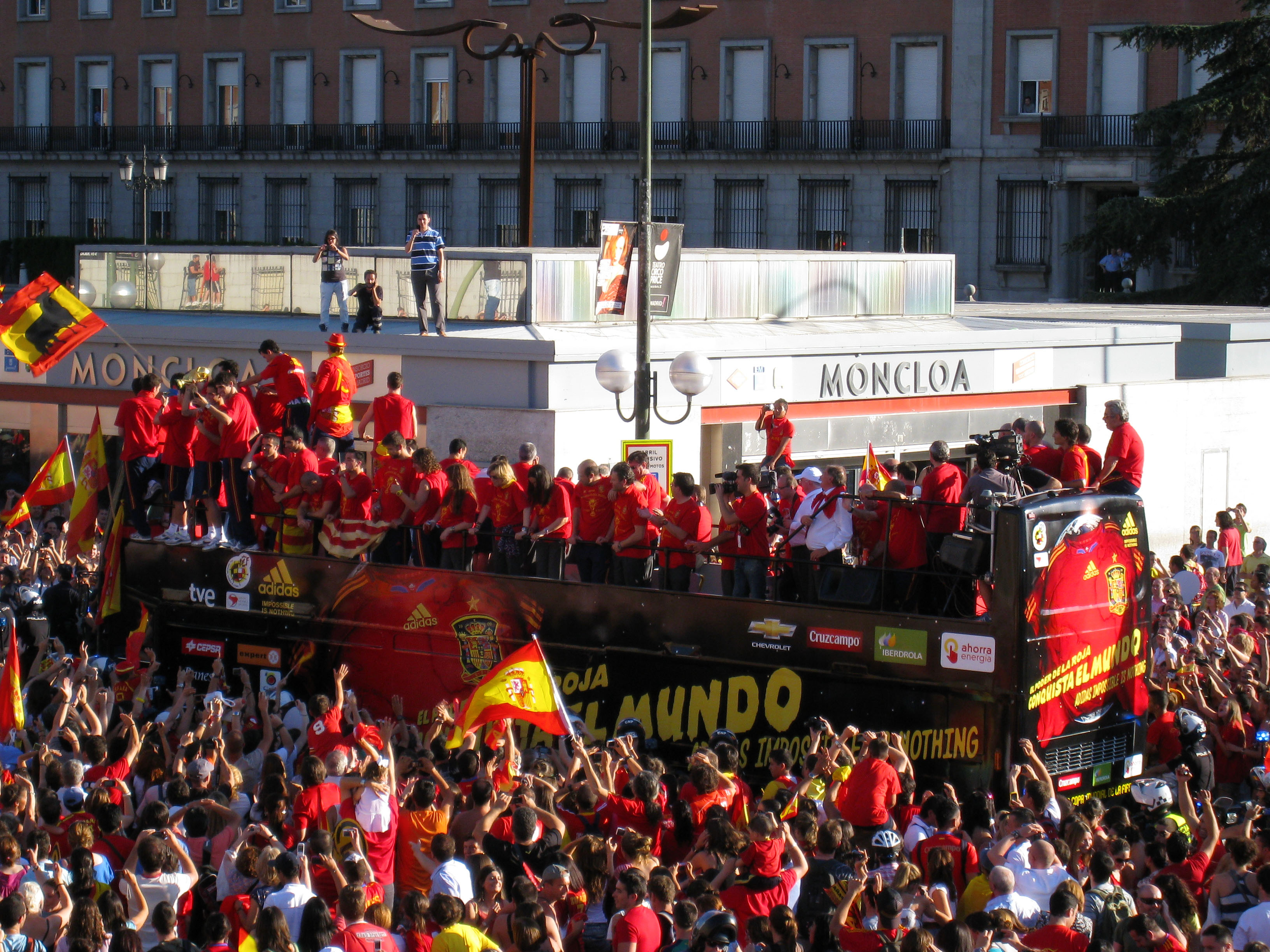
The Spain national football team celebrating their victory at the 2010 FIFA World Cup in Madrid.

Association football, commonly known as football (or soccer), (Spanish: Fútbol asociación), is the most popular sport in Spain. Football is a widespread passion among the people of Spain, and most people in Spain have at least some sort of connection to the sport. Football is the sport with the most registered players (a total of 1,063,090 of which 997,106 are men and 77,461 women, a 55% rise in women since 2014), and highest number of registered clubs (a total of 29,205) among all Spanish sport federations according to data issued by the sports administration of Spain's government in 2020.

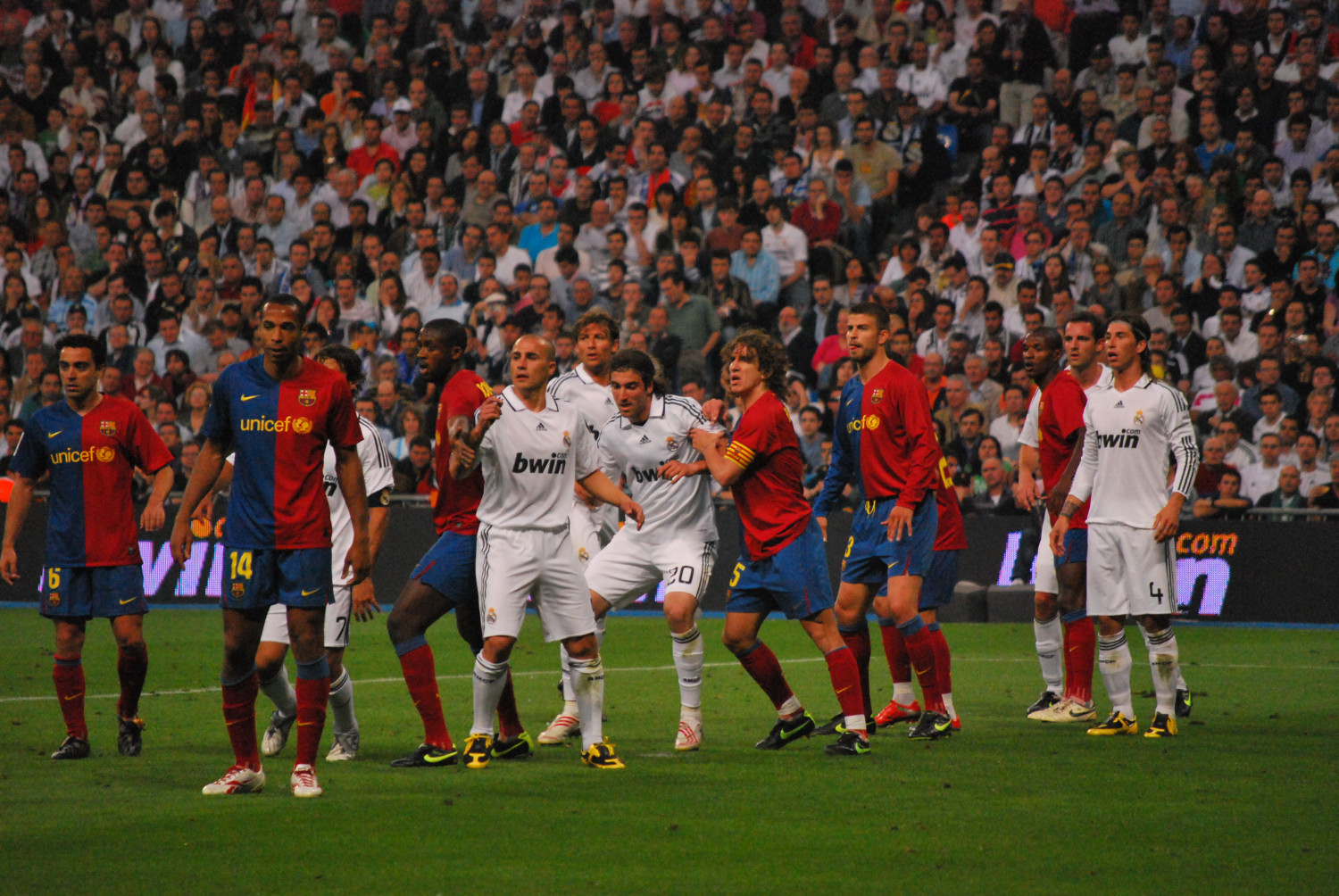
El Clásico: the iconic football rivalry between Real Madrid and FC Barcelona.

La Liga or Primera División (The Spanish League) is considered to be one of the world's best competitions in men's football. Successful teams in recent European competitions are Real Madrid, FC Barcelona, Sevilla, Athletic Bilbao, Valencia CF and Atlético Madrid. Real Madrid and Barcelona have dominated for much of their history, and created an intimate rivalry, which is known as El Clásico. Real Madrid has been dubbed by many pundits as the most successful club in the world, having won the UEFA Champions League a record 15 times, almost all other UEFA club competitions at least once, and La Liga a record 35 times. Barcelona has been European champions 5 times, and won La Liga on 26 occasions. Other teams such as Atlético Madrid, Sevilla and Valencia have also gained prominence by winning the UEFA Europa League, with 9 titles going to Spanish teams since 2004.

Real Madrid and FC Barcelona are the two most popular sports clubs on social media in the world as of 7 February 2024:

#	Sports club	Country	Sport	Followers
1	Real Madrid	Spain	Football	360.5 million
2	FC Barcelona	Spain	Football	318.8 million
3	Manchester United	United Kingdom	Football	207 million
4	Paris Saint-Germain	France	Football	163 million
5	Juventus	Italy	Football	147.4 million
6	Manchester City	United Kingdom	Football	139.7 million
7	Chelsea FC	United Kingdom	Football	136.7 million
8	Liverpool FC	United Kingdom	Football	131.6 million
9	Bayern Munich	Germany	Football	126.5 million
10	Arsenal FC	United Kingdom	Football	99.2 million

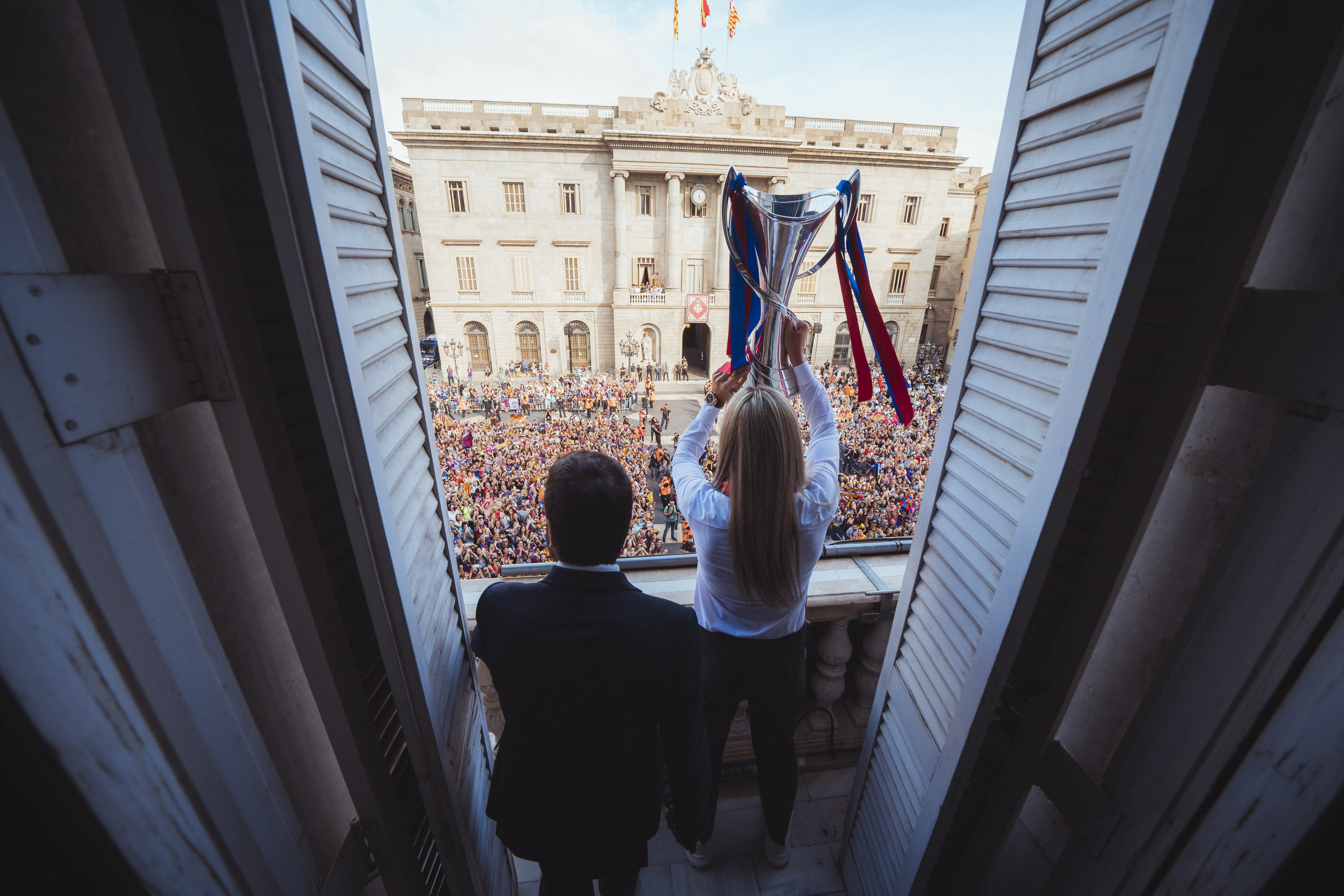
Alexia Putellas lifts the trophy of the 2022–23 Champions League, celebrating Barcelona Femení's victory.

Liga F is the highest league for women's football in the country and is one of the most important leagues in Europe. FC Barcelona are the dominant team, winning the league 8 times. Barcelona has also won the Champions League three times in the last four years.

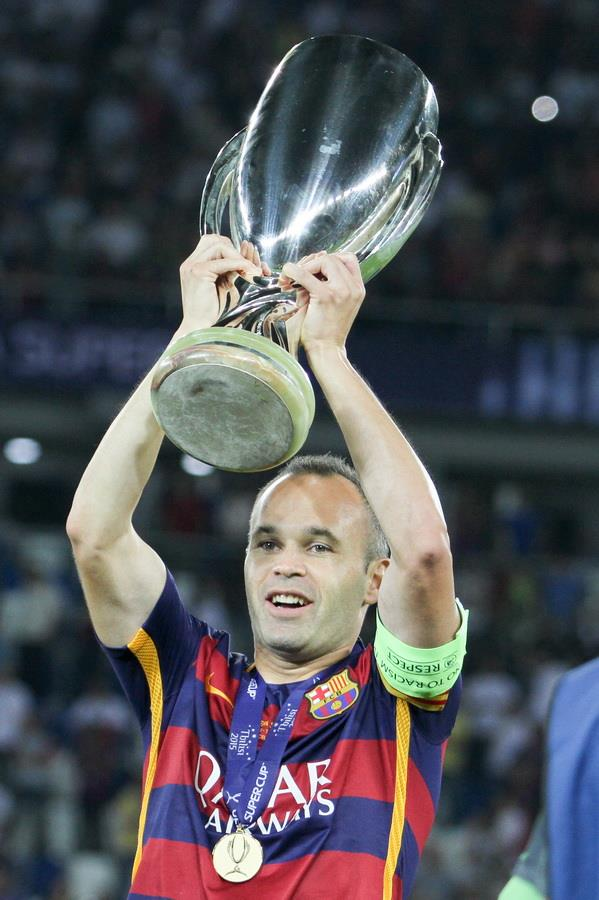
Andrés Iniesta lifting the 2015 UEFA Super Cup trophy.

The Spain men's national team has been successful and has qualified for the FIFA World Cup tournament fifteen times since 1934. In 2010, Spain defeated the Netherlands in the final to win the tournament for the first time. 16 years later in 2026, they won the tournament again defeating Argentina 1-0 in extra time. In the European Championship they were champions in 1964, 2008, 2012 and 2024, and runners-up in 1984. Spain has won three medals in football Olympic Games tournaments. They have won two silver medals at the Sydney 2000 and at the Tokyo 2020 Olympic Games, as well as two gold medals at the Barcelona 1992 and at the Paris 2024 Olympics.

Women's football in Spain has seen a massive increase in popularity after being banned until the late 1970s. The Spain women's national team were champions in the 2023 World Cup. In 2026, after the men's team won the Men's World Cup, Spain became the first nation to have both of their national teams simultaneously as world champions.

The women's youth teams have been dominant. The national U-17 team won the U-17 European Championship in 2010, 2011, 2015, and 2018, as well as becoming champions at the 2018 and 2022 U-17 World Cups, and finalists in the 2014 U-17 World Cup. The U-19 national team won the UEFA U-19 European Championship in 2004, 2017, 2018, 2022, and 2023. The U-20 national team were runner-ups at the 2018 U-20 World Cup and then champions at the 2022 U-20 World Cup. By winning the 2022 U-17 World Cup, 2022 U-20 World Cup, and the 2023 World Cup, Spain become the first country to hold all three women's championships at the same time.

The men's youth teams have also been successful in the past. The U-20 team won the FIFA World Youth Championship in 1999 and were runners-up in 1985 and 2003. The U-17 team was runners-up three times and won third place in 1997 in the FIFA U-17 World Cup.

==== Futsal ====
The Spanish futsal league is divided into divisions. The top teams play in the Primera División (also called Liga Nacional de Fútbol Sala). In each division, a team plays all other teams twice, once at home and once away.

The Spanish league teams compete in Europe under UEFA, most notably in the UEFA Futsal Cup with great success, being the national league holding more continental titles. The teams also compete in a domestic cup competition each year, called the Copa del Rey. The winner of the División de Honor plays against the winner of the Copa del Rey in the Supercopa de España (Super Cup).

The Spain national futsal team represents the whole country, and has twice won the World Championship and six times the UEFA Futsal Championship, which makes Spain the second international futsal power, after Brazil.

=== Basketball ===
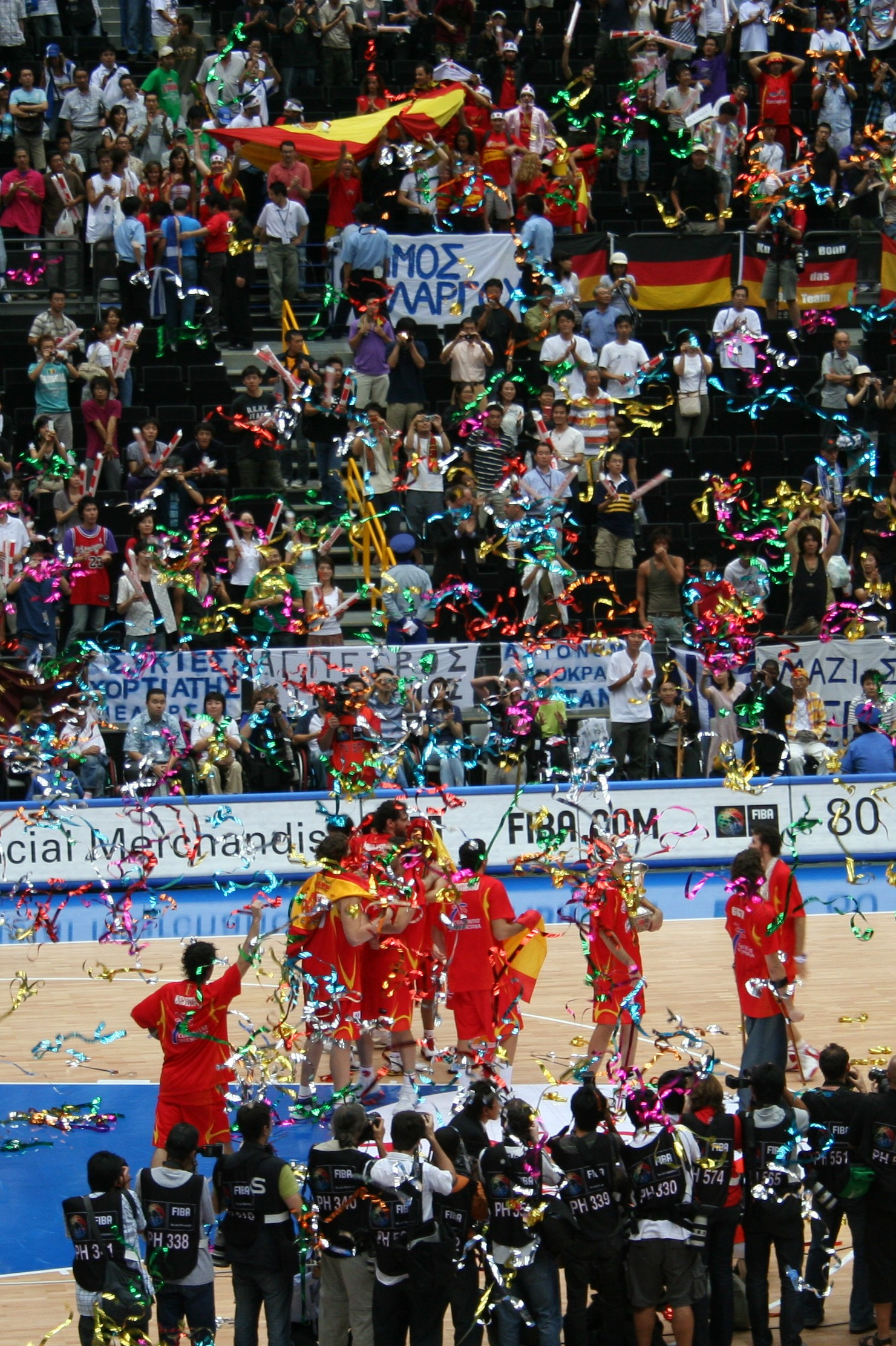
The Spain men's national basketball team during the 2006 World Championship final.

The Spanish ACB is one of the major European basketball leagues. Spanish teams such as Real Madrid Baloncesto, FC Barcelona Bàsquet and Joventut Badalona have won international championships such as the Euroleague or Eurocup.

A number of Spanish players such as Santi Aldama, Juancho Hernangómez, and French-Spanish Zaccharie Risacher are currently playing in the NBA. Other Spanish players who have recently played in the league include Rudy Fernandez, Ricky Rubio, Serge Ibaka, Sergio Rodríguez, and brothers Pau Gasol and Marc Gasol.

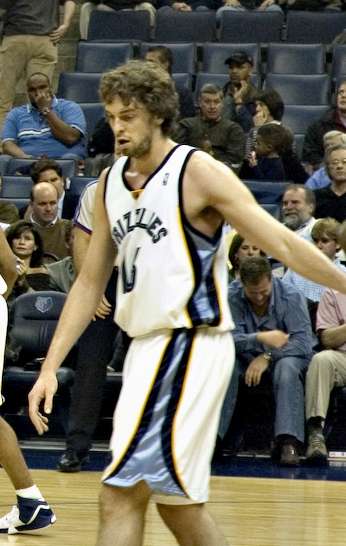
Pau Gasol wearing the jersey of the Memphis Grizzlies.

The Spanish men's national basketball team has achieved a high ranked position in the international tournament by winning their first ever gold medal at the 2006 FIBA World Championship, and have hosted the 1986 FIBA World Championship and 2014 FIBA Basketball World Cup. also won six silver medals and four gold medals at the EuroBasket. Most recently, they won the gold medal at EuroBasket 2011, a silver at the 2012 Summer Olympics, a gold at EuroBasket 2015, a bronze at the 2016 Summer Olympics, a gold at the 2019 FIBA Basketball World Cup and another gold at EuroBasket 2022. The women's national team were silver medalists at the 2014 FIBA World Championship for Women (since renamed the FIBA Women's Basketball World Cup) and 2016 Olympics. They have also won nine medals (three gold, one silver, five bronze) at EuroBasket Women, most recently a gold in 2017. The country finished third in the FIBA Women's World Cup in 2018. The Spanish men's national basketball team ranked 1st in the FIBA ranking in September 2022, surpassing the United States for the first time ever.

=== Handball ===
The Spanish Liga ASOBAL is one of the best club competitions. A number of Spanish teams such as BM Ciudad Real, FC Barcelona Handbol, and Portland San Antonio have won or were finalists in the EHF Champions League.

Since the 1990s the men's national team has won eight medals in top class international tournaments, with three bronze medals at the Olympics, three second and a third place at the European Championships and two World Championships (2005 and 2013).

=== Calendar of the major men's and women's professional sports leagues in Spain ===
January	February	March	April	May	June	July	August	September	October	November	December
La Liga (Football)							La Liga (Football)				
Liga ACB (Basketball)									Liga ACB (Basketball)		
Liga ASOBAL (Handball)								Liga ASOBAL (Handball)			
Primera División (Futsal)								Primera División (Futsal)			

January	February	March	April	May	June	July	August	September	October	November	December
Liga F (Football)								Liga F (Football)			
Liga Femenina de Baloncesto (Basketball)									Liga Femenina de Baloncesto (Basketball)		
Liga Guerreras (Handball)							Liga Guerreras (Handball)				
Primera División (Futsal)								Primera División (Futsal)			

== Other teams sports ==
=== Water polo ===
The Spain men's national water polo team is no stranger to the world's elite of this sport. The 1990s were a particularly successful decade for the Spanish team. Major achievements included a Silver medal at the 1992 Olympics and its greatest performance to date, winning the gold medal at the 1996 Olympics.

Other remarkable performances include winning the gold medal at the 1998 World Aquatics Championships and, again, at the 2001 edition. They also took Silver at the 2009 FINA World Championships in Rome. Before that, Spain had taken Silver at the 1991 edition and then again at the 1994 World Aquatics Championships.

=== Roller hockey (Quad) ===
Roller hockey (Quad) is played by professional athletes. The Spain national team has won the World Championship 14 times with 12 second places and 7 third places and also won the European Championship 14 times with 15 second places and 5 third places. The Spanish teams as FC Barcelona, Reus Deportiu, Igualada HC and HC Liceo La Coruña has won the European Clubs Cup in 44 editions, losing only in 7.

=== Rugby union ===
Rugby union in Spain is a growing team sport in Spain the country. As of 2019, there were 37,241 registered rugby union players in Spain, playing for 332 clubs in various divisions. The sport's governing body in Spain, the Spanish Rugby Federation (Spanish: Federación Española de Rugby), was founded in 1923. It joined the International Rugby Board in 1988, and is also a member of Rugby Europe.

==== 2035 Rugby World Cup Bid ====
In October 2026, the Spanish Rugby Federation put forward a proposal to host the 2035 Rugby World Cup. Under the proposal, the final would be held at the Camp Nou in Barcelona and, if successful, it would be the first time the final is held in front of a crowd of more than 100,000 fans. The Santiago Bernabéu in Madrid and Mestalla Stadium in Valencia would also be in line host major fixtures.

The proposal also aims to triple the number of people playing the sport in the country by 2035 and, ultimately, establish Spain as Tier One nation in rugby union.

=== Volleyball ===
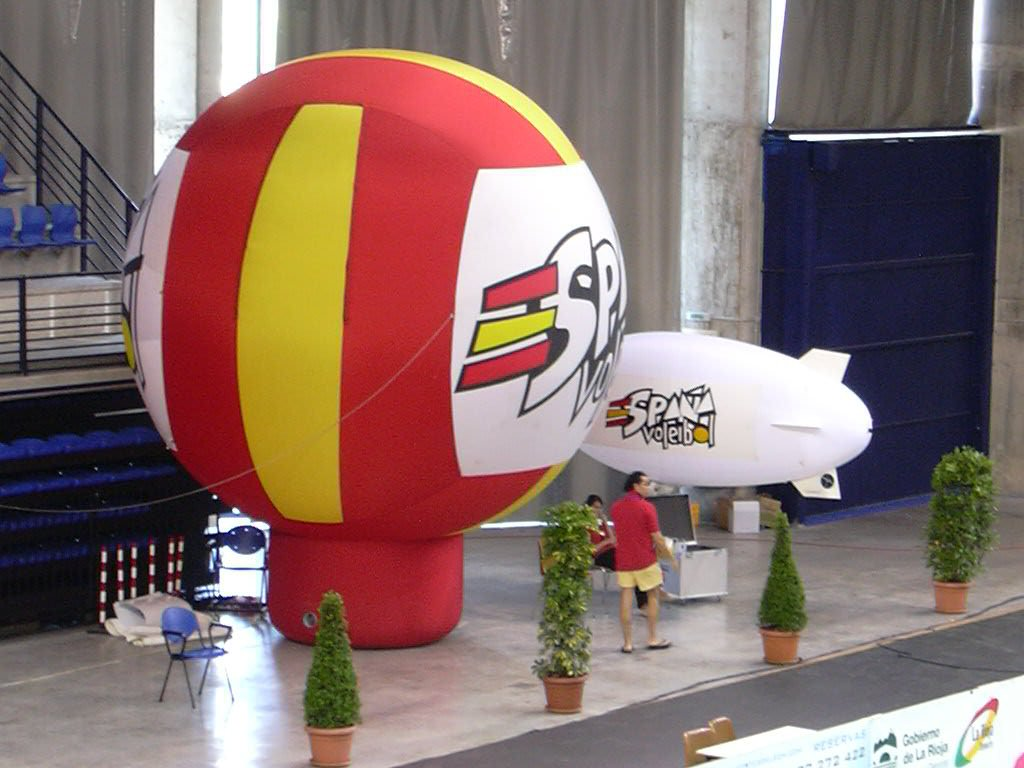
Promotional display for volleyball in Spain during a national team match

The league system for volleyball in Spain has the top teams playing in the Superliga. Each team plays all other teams twice, once at home and once away.

Spanish Volleyball League System
Level	Men's	Women's
1	Superliga	Superliga
2	Superliga 2	Superliga 2
3	Primera División	Primera División
4	Segunda División	Segunda División

The Spanish league teams compete in Europe under CEV, most notably in the Champions League for Men's and Champions League for Women's. The teams also compete in a domestic cup competition each year, called Copa del Rey de Voleibol (men's) and Copa de la Reina de Voleibol (women's). The winners of the Superliga play against the winners of the Copa in the Supercopa de España de Voleibol (Super Cup).

==== Beach volleyball ====
Spain featured national teams in beach volleyball that competed in the women's and men's section at the 2018–2020 CEV Beach Volleyball Continental Cup.

== Individual sports ==
=== Athletics ===
Athletics does not have a very high profile in Spain on a week-in week-out basis, but it leaps to prominence during major championships. Spanish Athletics Championships

=== Cycling ===
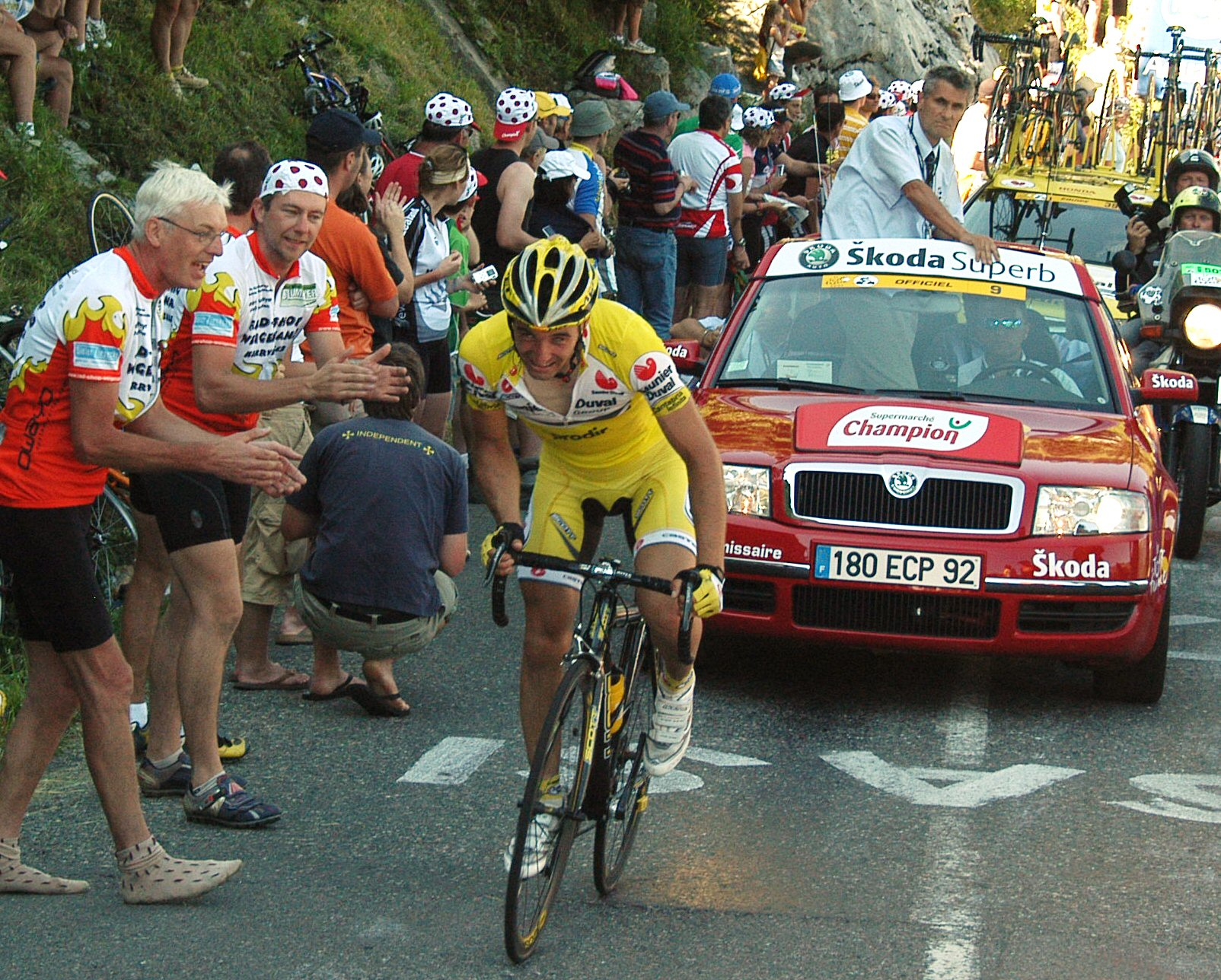
David de la Fuente during Stage 7 of the 2007 Tour de France at the Col de la Colombière.

Cycling has been an important sport in Spain since the 1940s. The Vuelta a España (Spanish for "Tour of Spain") is one of the most important cycling events in the world, together with the Tour de France (French for "Tour of France") and Giro d'Italia (Italian for "Tour of Italy") stage races, collectively known as the Grand Tours.

Several Spanish cycling athletes have won the Tour de France, including Federico Bahamontes, Luis Ocaña, Pedro Delgado, Óscar Pereiro, Alberto Contador, and Carlos Sastre. The most successful Spanish cyclist is Miguel Indurain. He won the Tour de France in five consecutive years between 1991 and 1995. He also won the Giro d'Italia in two consecutive years (1992 and 1993), the 1995 Road World Championship time trial and the gold medal in the 1996 Olympic time trial.

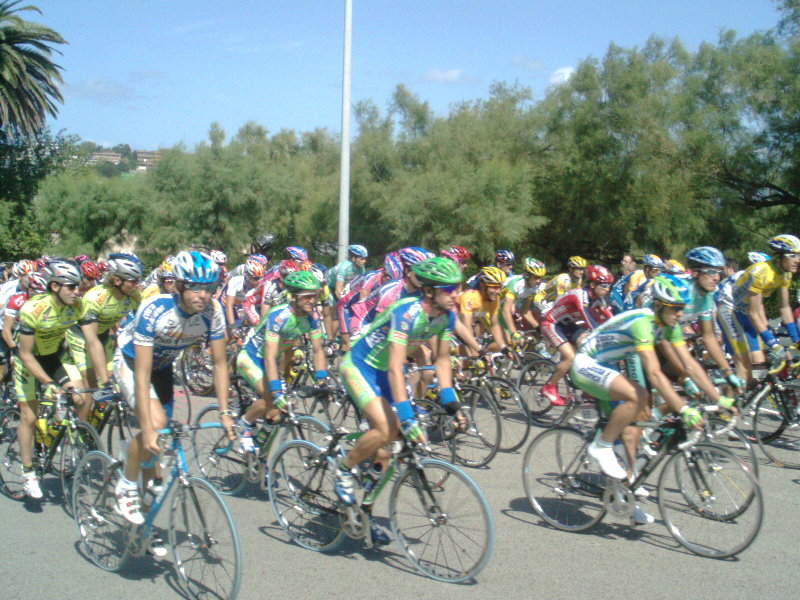
Cycling event in Santander, during La Vuelta a España.

More recently, in 2008, Sastre became the seventh and third consecutive Spaniard to win the Tour de France, then followed by Contador winning his second tour in 2009's edition. Contador was thought to have repeated his win in 2010, but the day before Stage 17, the queen stage finishing with atop the Col du Tourmalet, Contador tested positive for performance-enhancing substance Clenbuterol. Although he claimed it was a result of consuming contaminated beef, in January 2012 the Court of Arbitration for Sport ruled him guilty and gave him a two-year ban backdated from July 21, 2010, and had all his results achieved after July 21 erased, including victory in the 2010 Giro d'Italia and a 5th-place finish and most aggressive rider award for stage 19 at the 2011 Tour de France. Since returning from the ban, Contador has won the Vuelta twice, in 2012 and 2014.

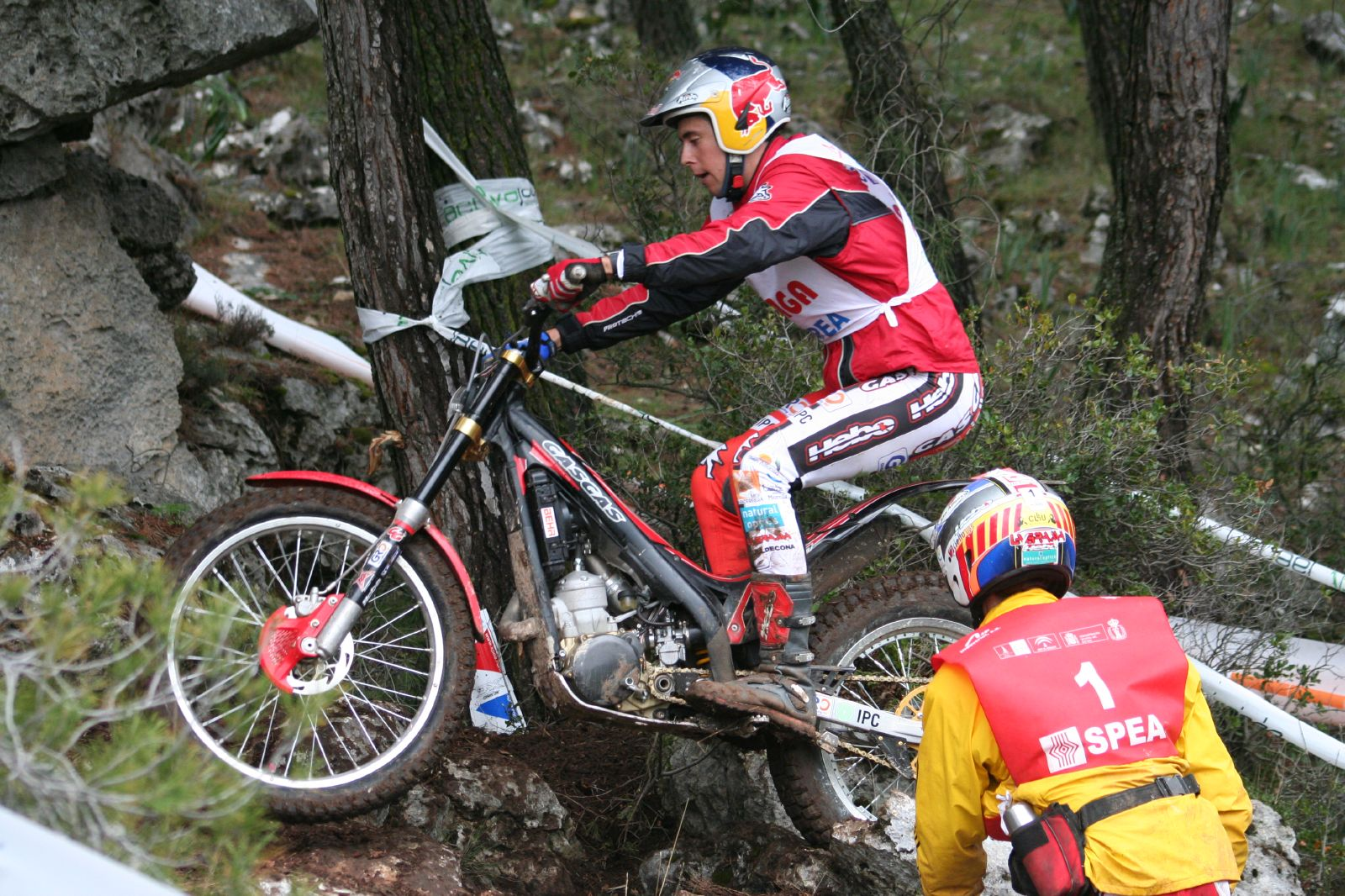
Adam Raga, motorcycle trials rider known for his exceptional skill and achievements in the sport.

Óscar Freire shares the distinction of being one of four men to win the World Road Racing Championship three times, as well as being a three-time winner of one of the most prestigious one-day classic cycle races, the Milan–San Remo. Abraham Olano won the Vuelta a España in 1998, and is the only man to win World Championships in both the road race (1995) and time trial (1998). Alejandro Valverde was the winner of the 2009 Vuelta a España, has won the one-day classic Liège–Bastogne–Liège four times, and in 2018 became World Road Race Champion after having previously finished second or third six times.

Spain has also produced some notable mountain bikers like José Antonio Hermida and track racers like Olympic medalists Joan Llaneras, José Manuel Moreno Periñán, José Antonio Escuredo or Sergi Escobar as well as multi-world champion Guillermo Timoner.

=== Gymnastics ===
==== Rhythmic gymnastics ====
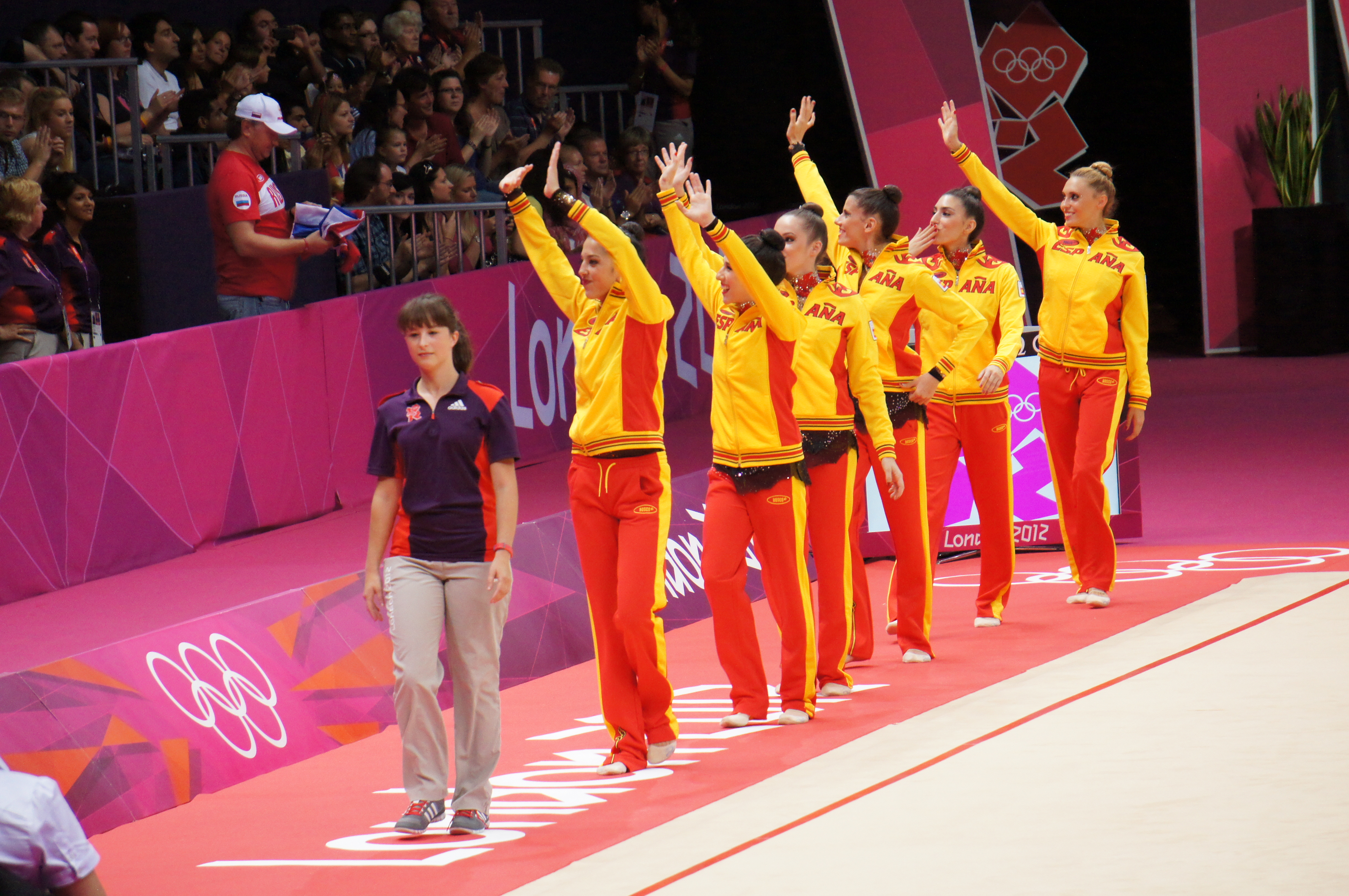
*El Equipaso* is the nickname of the Spanish rhythmic gymnastics group, Olympic silver medalists at the Rio 2016 Olympics. They were also world champions in the clubs event at the 2013 and 2014 World Championships.

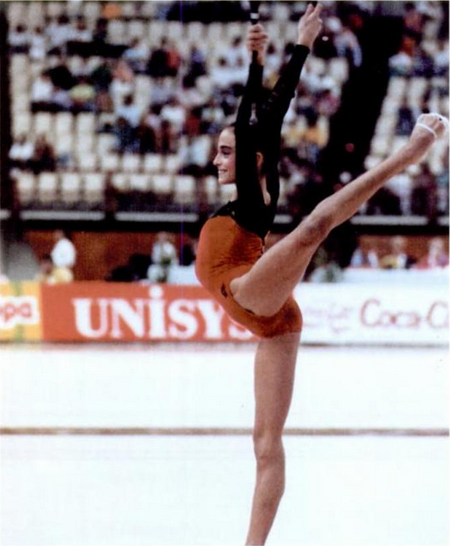
Carolina Pascual at the 1991 World Championships in Athens.

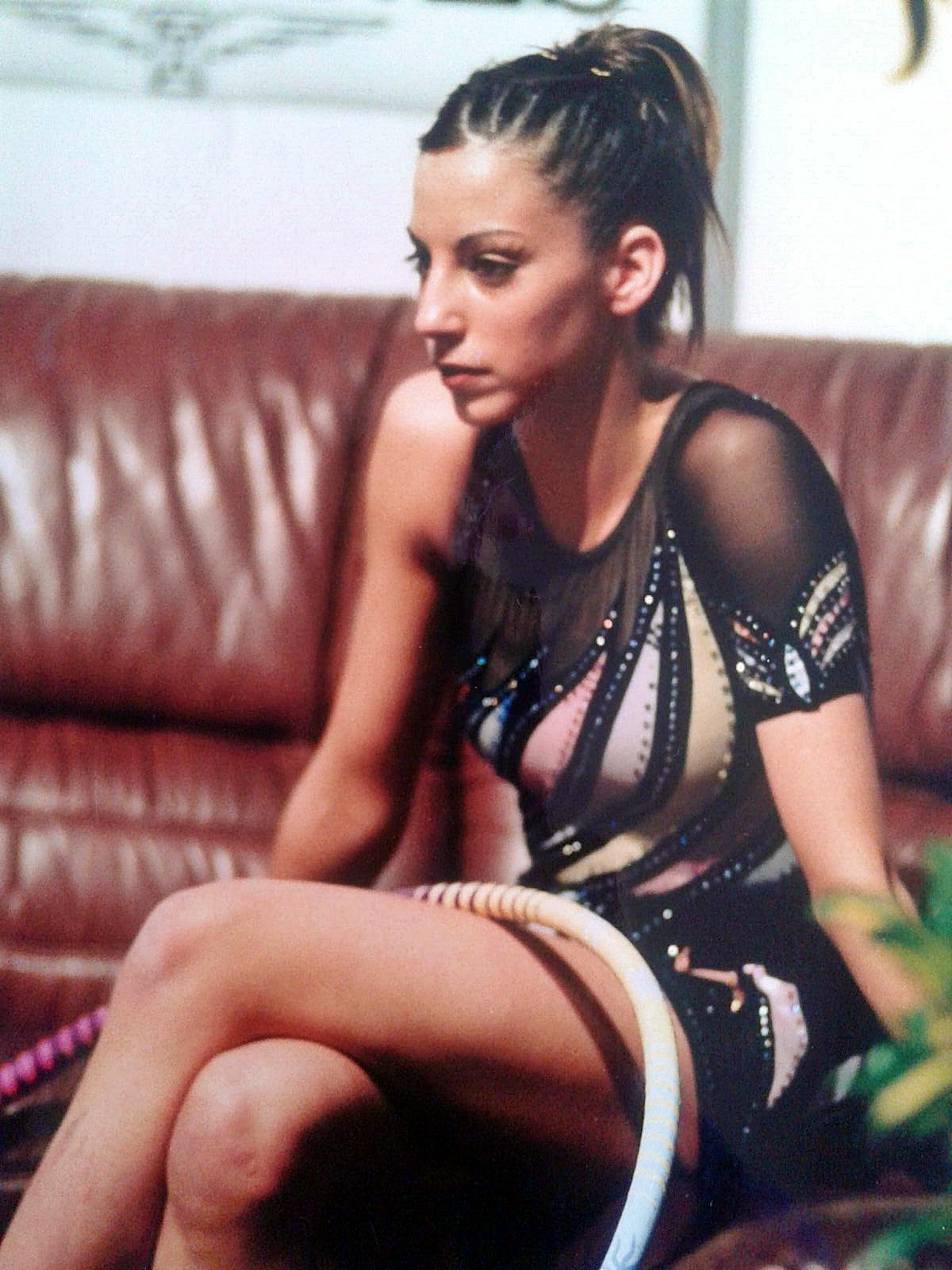
Almudena Cid in the 'Kiss and Cry' area at the 2003 European Championships.

Rhythmic gymnastics is a popular sport through all Spain, so far the most successful individual rhythmic gymnasts are Carolina Pascual who won a silver medal in the individual all around competition in Barcelona 1992, Carmen Acedo who won gold medal in clubs competition in World Championships in 1993 and Almudena Cid this last is the only rhythmic gymnast who has competed at four olympic finals, placing 9th at Atlanta 1996 and Sydney 2000 being 8th at Athens 2004 and Beijing 2008.

In the Atlanta 1996 the Spanish team won the first gold medal of the new competition by groups. The Spanish team was formed by Estela Giménez, Marta Baldó, Nuria Cabanillas, Lorena Guréndez, Estíbaliz Martínez and Tania Lamarca.

Medal standings in World Championships

	Deportista	1st place, gold medalist(s)	2nd place, silver medalist(s)	3rd place, bronze medalist(s)	Total
1	Nuria Cabanillas (Note: El oro y la plata del Campeonato Mundial de 1998 conseguidos por Nuria, fueron como suplente del conjunto en ambos ejercicios, aunque fue convocada a dicha competición.)	3	4	0	7
2	Estela Giménez	2	4	2	8
3	Marta Baldó	2	4	2	8
4	Estíbaliz Martínez	2	3	0	5
5	Tania Lamarca	2	3	0	5
6	Maider Esparza (Note: Las 5 medallas conseguidas por Maider, fueron como suplente del conjunto en ambos ejercicios, aunque fue convocada a estos campeonatos.)	2	3	0	5
7	Lorena Guréndez	2	2	0	4
8	Alejandra Quereda	2	0	2	4
9	Sandra Aguilar	2	0	2	4
10	Lourdes Mohedano	2	0	2	4
11	Elena López	2	0	2	4
12	Artemi Gavezou	2	0	2	4

Spain has found more success in the group competition than at the individual one, the country won many medals and gained prominence in the 90's which has its peak at the Centennial Olympic Games in Atlanta 1996, after the world championships at home in Seville 1998 the group went downhill and had inconsistent results until 2012 when they finished at the 4th place at the Olympic Games in 2012 London Olympics and a performance they would repeat at the 2013 World Championships in Kyiv where the Spanish group won the gold at the 10 clubs final and a bronze in the 3 balls + 2 ribbons final, their firsts world championships medals in 15 years, at the 2014 World Championships in İzmir, Turkey they retained their world title in the 10 clubs final. At the 2015 World Rhythmic Gymnastics Championships held in Stuttgart, Germany the group won the bronze medal at the all around competition, since 1998 the Spanish group hasn't won an all around medal.

Also for the first time in 9 years the country classified two gymnast for the individual all-around final, Natalia Garcia who finished in the 19th spot and Carolina Rodriguez who got the 11th place.

=== Tennis ===
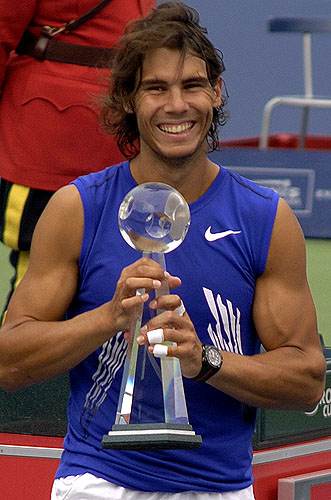
Rafael Nadal holding the 2008 Rogers Cup trophy.

Spanish tennis is particularly characterised by success on clay courts, which many Spaniards train on in their youth. Spanish players have won 28 singles titles at the French Open, the only modern clay court major. In team competition, Spain has won the Davis Cup six times (2000, 2004, 2008, 2009, 2011 and 2019) and the Billie Jean King Cup (formerly Fed Cup) five times (1991, 1993, 1994, 1995 and 1998).

Rafael Nadal is widely regarded as the greatest Spanish tennis player of all time, and as one of the greatest tennis players of all time. During his professional career, which spanned 2001-2024, he won 22 Grand Slam men's singles titles, the second-most in history. This included a record 14 victories at the French Open.

Despite his sobriquet as the "King of Clay", Nadal saw success on all court surfaces. After defeating then-world No. 1 Roger Federer, Nadal claimed his first Wimbledon title in a historic final in 2008. In 2009, he became the first Spaniard to win the Australian Open. By defeating Novak Djokovic in the 2010 US Open final, he became the first man in history to win majors on clay, grass, and hard courts in a calendar year (Surface Slam), and the first Spaniard to complete a Career Grand Slam. Nadal is also one of three men to achieve the Career Golden Slam in singles, and a two-time Olympic gold medalist, having won the singles event at the 2008 Beijing Olympics and the doubles event at the 2016 Rio Olympics.

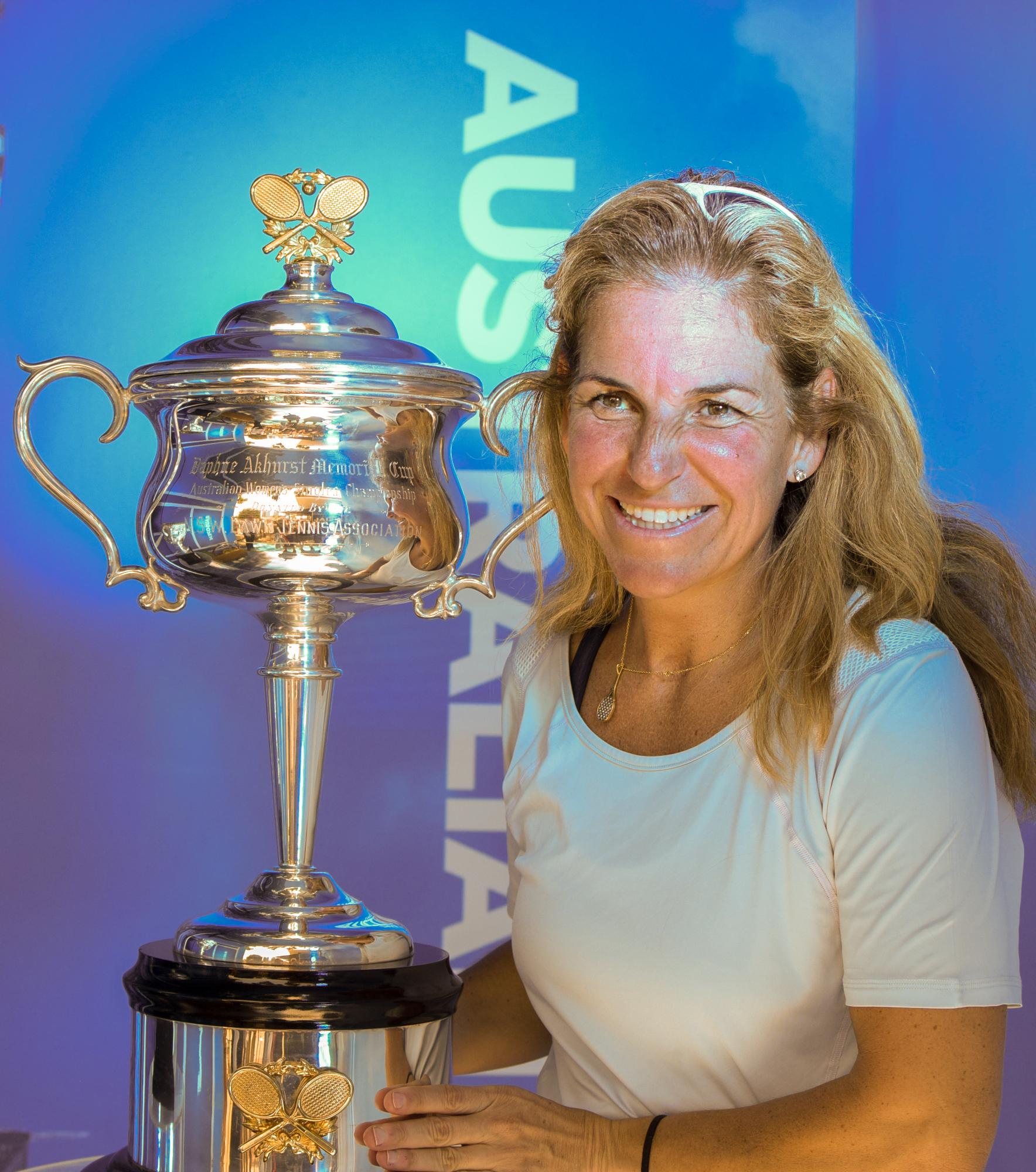
Arantxa Sánchez Vicario won a total of four Grand Slam singles titles.

Active player Carlos Alcaraz is widely regarded as Nadal's natural successor and the second-most successful Spanish tennis player of the Open Era. In 2022, Alcaraz won his first major title at the US Open, becoming the youngest man in the Open Era to reach world No. 1, at 19 years old. He finished the year as the youngest year-end No. 1 in ATP rankings history. Alcaraz has since collected a total of seven major singles titles: one at the Australian Open, two at the French Open, two at Wimbledon, and two at the US Open. With his first victory at the Australian Open in 2026, he became the second Spaniard and youngest man in history to complete the Career Grand Slam.

Spain has produced several other players who have been ranked world No. 1 in the Open Era: Arantxa Sánchez Vicario in 1995 (champion at the French Open in 1989, 1994, and 1998, and at the US Open in 1994), Carlos Moyá in 1999 (1998 French Open champion), Juan Carlos Ferrero in 2003 (2003 French Open champion), and Garbiñe Muguruza in 2017 (2016 French Open and 2017 Wimbledon champion). Other major singles champions include Manuel Santana (1961 and 1964 French Open; 1966 Wimbledon; 1965 US Open), Sergi Bruguera (1993 and 1994 French Open), Andrés Gimeno (1972 French Open), Conchita Martínez (1994 Wimbledon) and Albert Costa (2002 French Open).

Tennis tournaments held annually in Spain include the Madrid Open, an ATP Masters 1000 and WTA 1000 event; the Barcelona Open, an ATP 500 event; and the Mallorca Open, an ATP 250 and WTA 125 event.

=== Motorsports ===
==== Auto racing ====
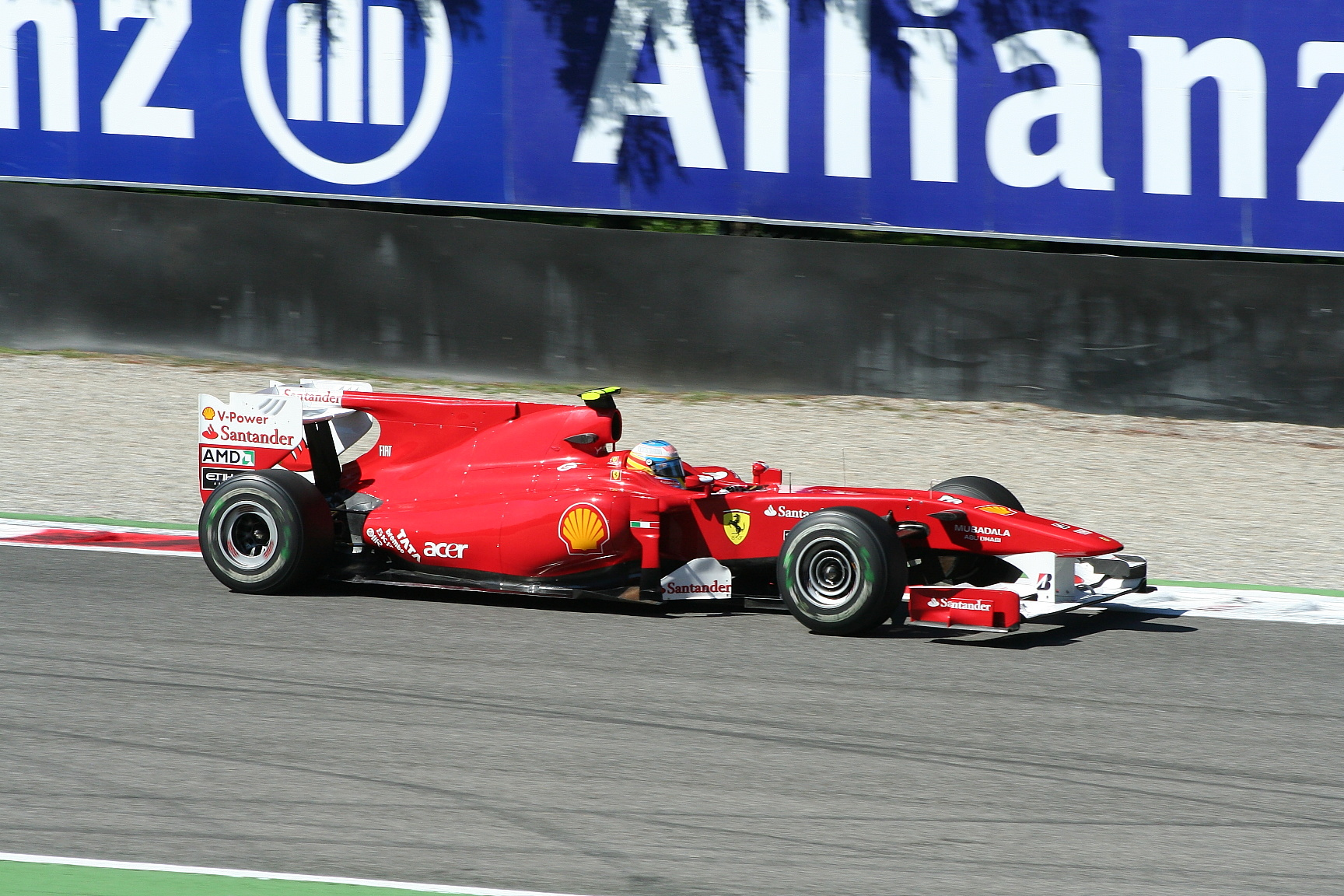
Fernando Alonso competing at the 2010 Italian Grand Prix

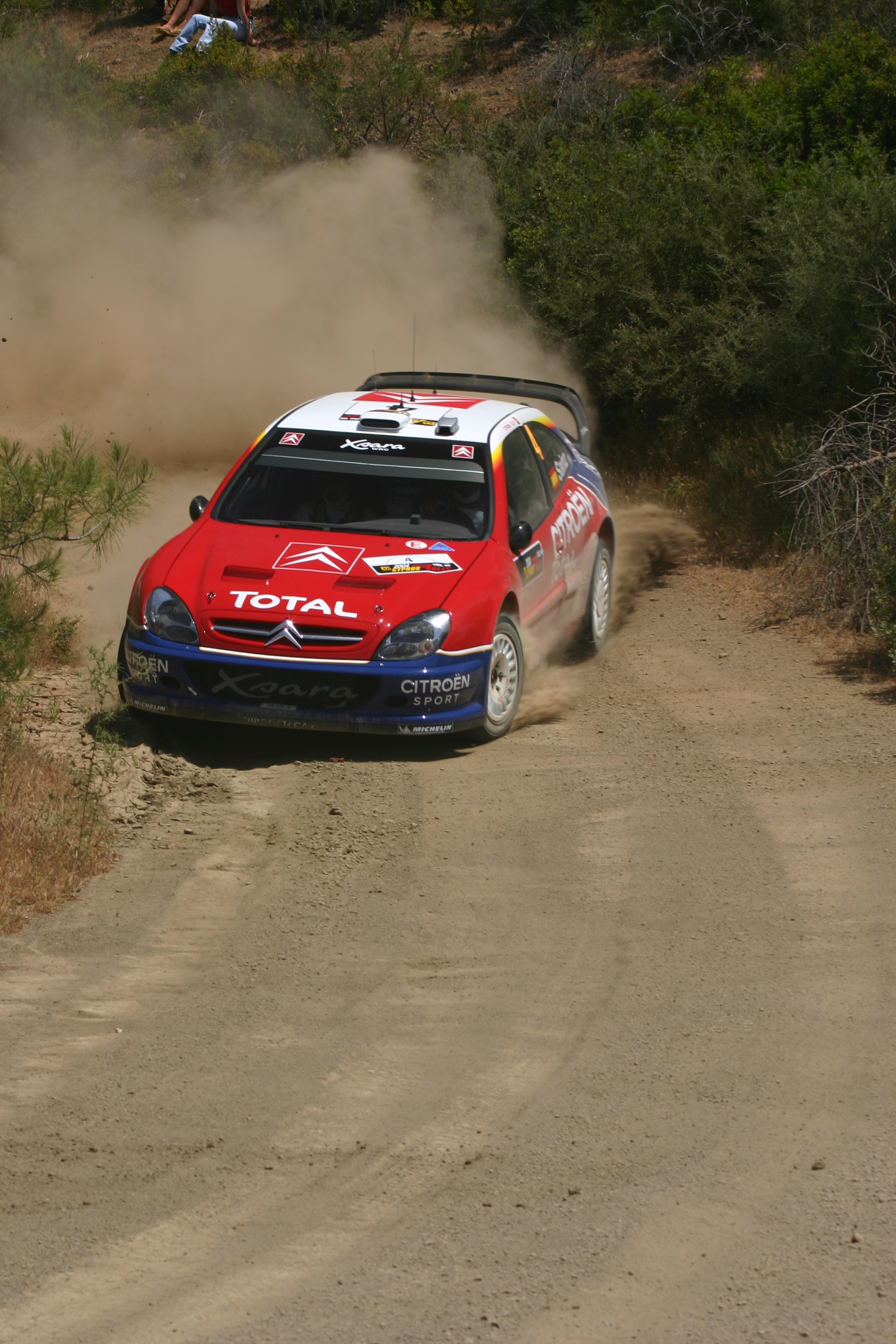
Carlos Sainz, Spanish rally driver, with a Citroën Xsara WRC during the 2004 Cyprus Rally season

In Formula One, the two world championships of Fernando Alonso in 2005 and 2006, helped to make more popular this sport in Spain, other notable Spanish drivers are Alfonso de Portago, Pedro de la Rosa and currently Carlos Sainz Jr. Also, Spain host the Spanish Grand Prix currently in Montmeló and previously the European Grand Prix in Jerez (1994, 1997) and Valencia (2008–2012).

In the World Rally Championship Spanish rally driver Carlos Sainz was crowned world champion in 1990 and 1992 and is ranked third with most wins with 26. Sainz retired from WRC in 2005 and switched to rally raid, where he won the 2010 Dakar Rally. Daniel Sordo has achieved best results since then by finishing third in the World Rally Championship in 2008 and 2009.

In endurance racing, Fermín Vélez is two-time 12 Hours of Sebring winner and two-time World Sportscar Championship Group C2 champion, Marc Gené won the 2009 24 Hours of Le Mans and 2010 12 Hours of Sebring, and Antonio García won the 2009 24 Hours of Daytona. Fernando Alonso won the 2018-2019 FIA WEC World Championship, taking wins at the 2018 and 2019 24 Hours of Le Mans. He also won the 2019 24 Hours of Daytona.

==== Motorcycle racing ====
Spain has a long history of success in several categories of motorcycle racing.

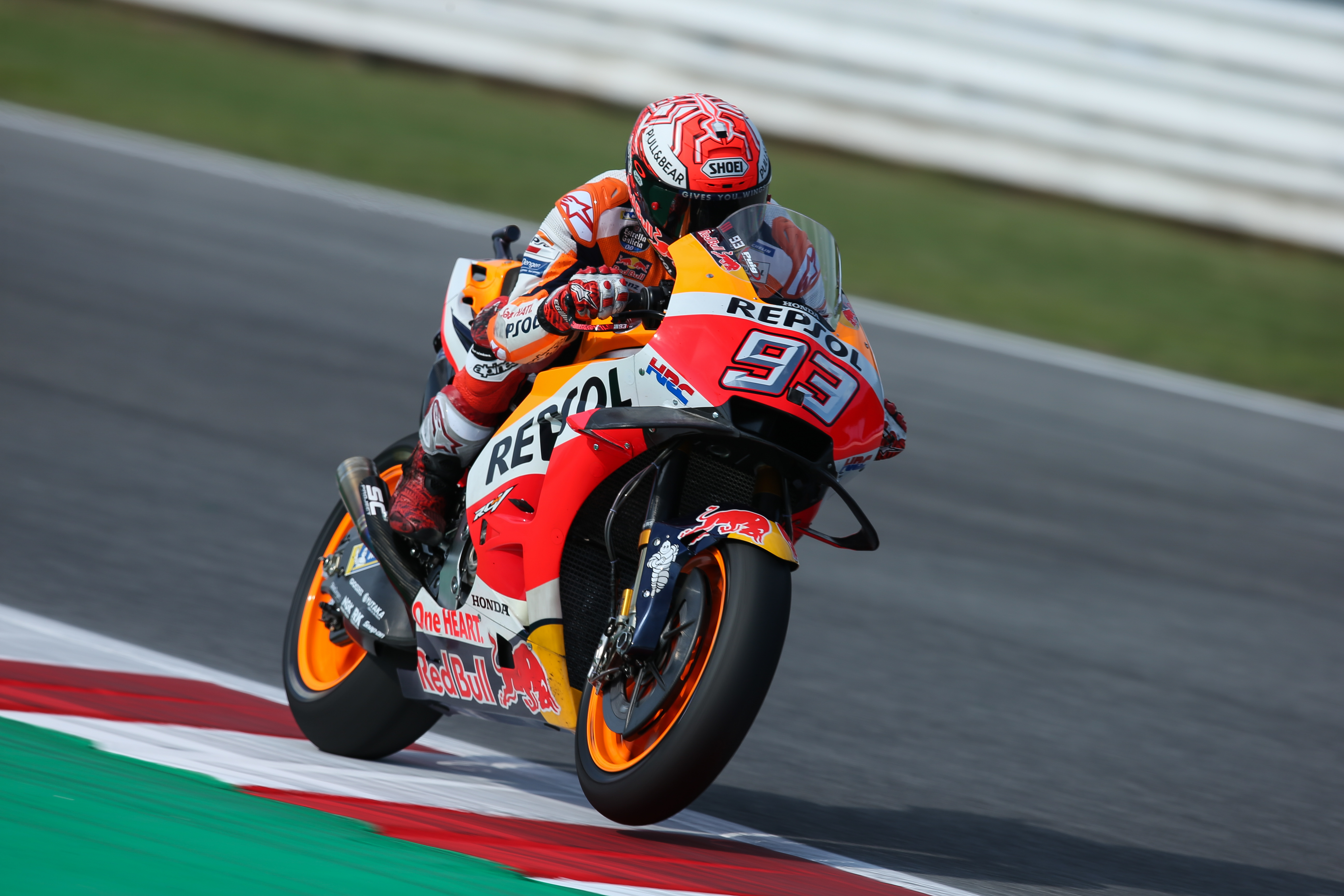
Marc Márquez riding in the 2018 San Marino Grand Prix

Spain has dominated Grand Prix motorcycle racing, popularly known as MotoGP, for much of the 21st century. The first Spanish champion in the premier class was Àlex Crivillé, who won the title for Honda in 1999. Spain's golden age in MotoGP began in the 2010s. Jorge Lorenzo secured three premier class titles with Yamaha, in 2010, 2012, and 2015. Active rider Marc Márquez has won seven premier class titles: with Honda in 2013, 2014, 2016, 2017, 2018, and 2019, and with Ducati in 2025. Joan Mir won the title for Suzuki in 2020, and Jorge Martín for Ducati satellite team Pramac in 2024.

Marc Márquez is widely considered one of the greatest motorcycle racers of all time. His seven premier class titles put him level with Valentino Rossi for the second-most in history, just one behind Italian legend Giacomo Agostini. Márquez has two additional world titles in the lower classes 125cc and Moto2. With his first MotoGP title in 2013, he became the youngest premier class champion of all time. In 2016, at the age of 23, Márquez equalled and still holds the all-time Grand Prix record for pole positions. He became the youngest rider to win his seventh and eighth world titles. After several years disrupted by injuries and a slow motorcycle, he left Honda for Ducati and claimed his ninth title in 2025. His brother Alex Márquez finished runner-up.

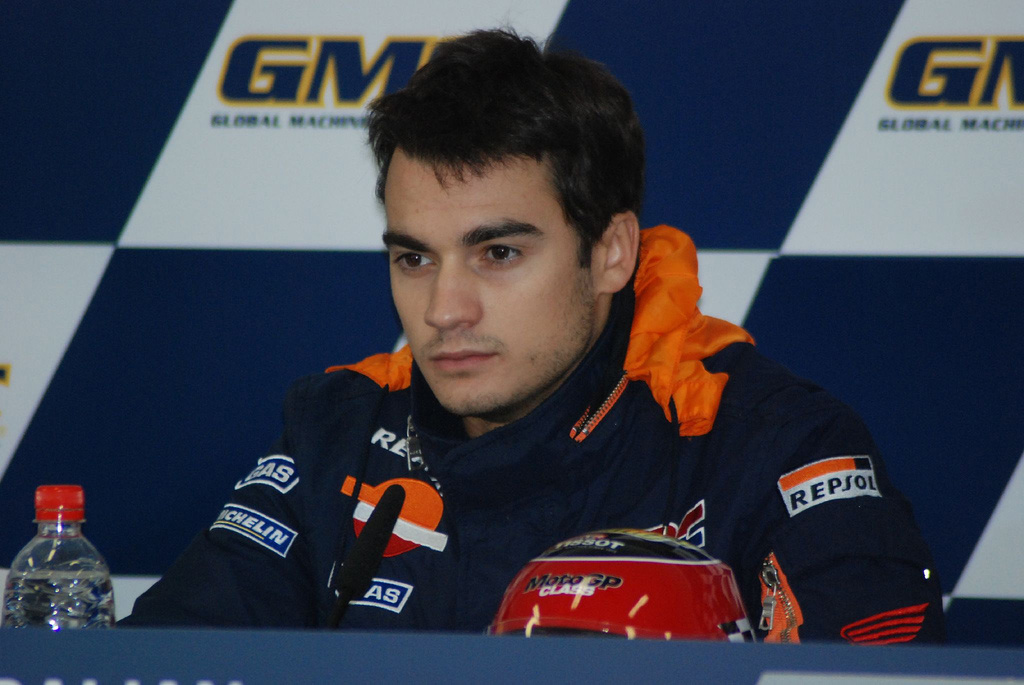
Dani Pedrosa, retired Spanish MotoGP rider

Other notable Spanish Grand Prix motorcycle racers include Dani Pedrosa, often described as the greatest rider never to win a premier class championship; Nicolás Terol, Emilio Alzamora, Jorge Martínez Aspar, Sete Gibernau, Sito Pons, and Ángel Nieto. Spain currently hosts several Grand Prix events: the Catalan motorcycle Grand Prix, the Spanish motorcycle Grand Prix, the Aragon motorcycle Grand Prix, and the Valencian Community motorcycle Grand Prix.

Spanish riders have also seen success in the Superbike World Championship: with Carlos Checa crowned champion in 2011 and Álvaro Bautista in 2022. Laia Sanz has won multiple women's world titles in motorcycle trials and enduro as well as several wins in the women's class of the Dakar Rally. Ana Carrasco became the first female motorcyclist to win a world title when she became Supersport 300 World Champion in 2018.

=== Golf ===
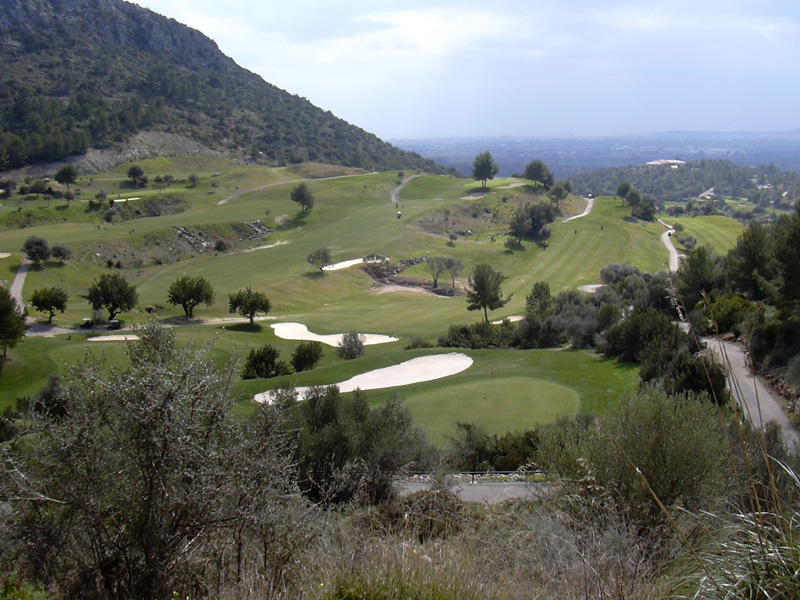
Golf course in Mallorca, a popular sport destination in Spain.

Golf has become popular among the Spanish. There are a number of courses located in different parts of Spain. They include the San Roque, Sotogrande, Valderrama, and Alcaidesa. Spain hosted the 1997 Ryder Cup.

Spanish golfer Seve Ballesteros won the U.S. Masters Tournament twice, and the British Open three times. José María Olazábal has won two Masters titles. Jon Rahm won the U.S. Open in 2021, being the first Spaniard to do so and he also was World No.1 for several weeks in both amateur and professional rankings. Sergio García spent much of his career in the top 10 of the Official World Golf Rankings (over 250 weeks between 2000 and 2008) and won the 2017 Masters. In the women's game, Spain fielded the winning team in the inaugural International Crown in 2014.

=== Combat sports ===
==== Boxing ====
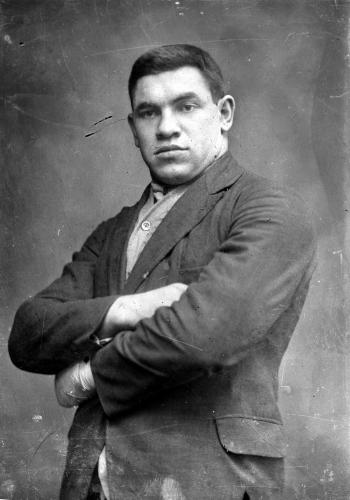
Paulino Uzkudun, Spanish heavyweight boxer.

Well known boxers from Spain include:

- Javier Castillejo
- Pedro Carrasco
- Paulino Uzcudun
- Kiko Martínez

==== Judo ====
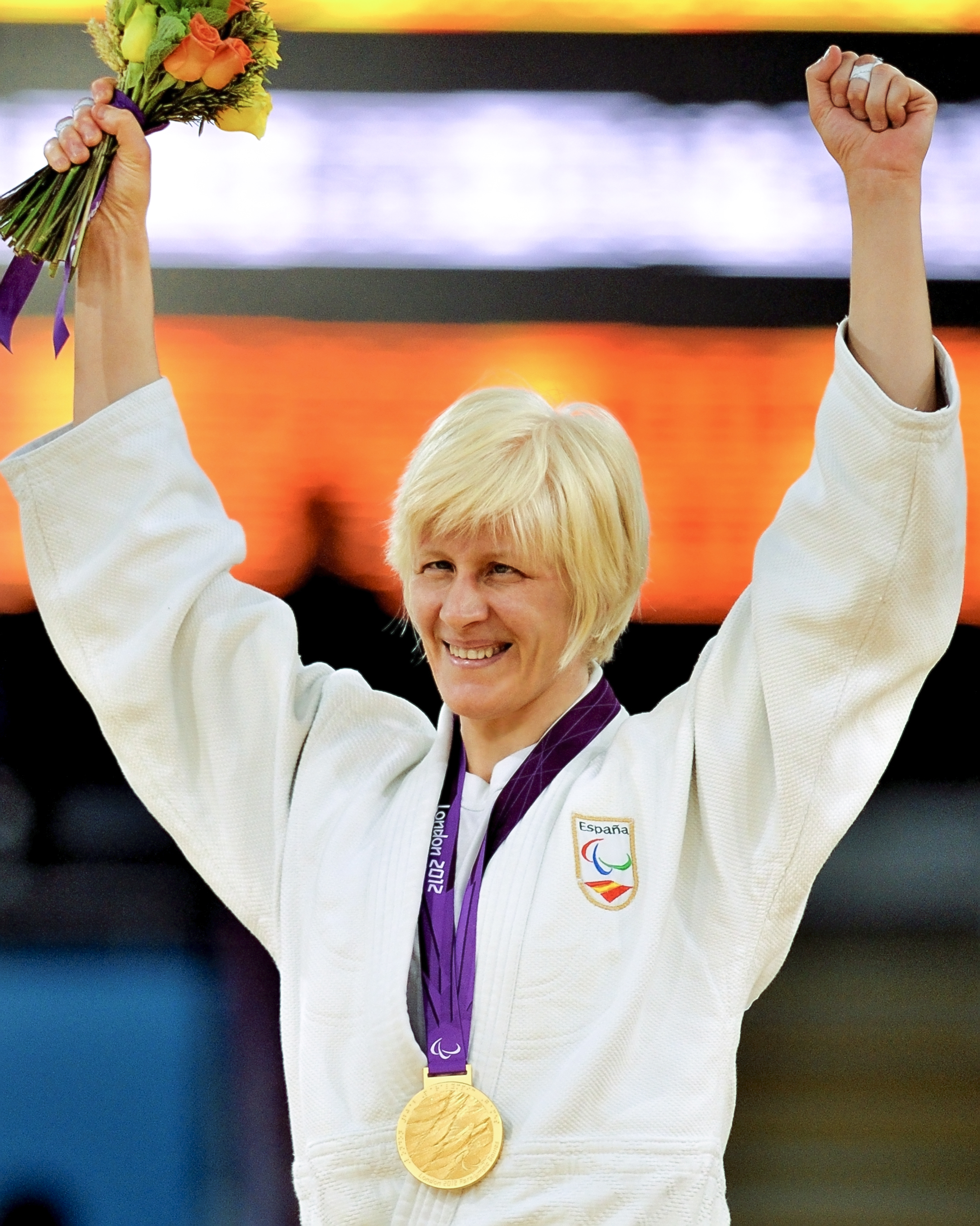
Carmen Herrera, Paralympic judoka

Spain has several judokas ranked in the top spots of the IJF ranking list, including Francisco Garrigós (#2 in -60kg), Alberto Gaitero (#7 in -66kg), Salvador Cases (#10 in -73kg), Ai Tsunoda (#5 in -70kg) and Julia Figueroa (#3 in -48kg) in the senior category, and Gemma Maria Gómez (#6 in -48kg), Marina Castelló (#3 in -52kg), Marta García (#4 in -57kg) and Laura Vázquez (#2 in -63kg) in the junior category. Spain has multiple Olympic medallists in judo: Francisco Garrigós (bronze in Paris 2024) and Ernesto Pérez (silver in Atlanta 1996) are its only male Olympic medallists. Yolanda Soler (bronze in Barcelona 1992), Almudena Muñoz and Miriam Blasco (both gold in Barcelona 1992) and Isabel Fernández (bronze in Atlanta 1996 and gold in Sydney 2000) are its female Olympic medallists. In addition, Nikoloz Sherazadishvili was Spain's first male world champion, doing so in 2018 and 2021. Francisco Garrigós won the title in 2023. Miriam Blasco won the title in 1991 and Almudena Muñoz did the same in 1997. Sugoi Uriarte, Joaquín Ruiz, Oiana Blanco, Sara Álvarez and María Bernabéu are also silver medallists in the World Championships. Paralympic judoka Carmen Herrera is one of the only two female paralympic judokas to win three gold medals in Paralympic Games, and Marta Arce is the only Spanish paralympic judoka to win four medals at the Games.

==== Karate ====
Damián Quintero and Sandra Sánchez are currently ranked #2 and #3 respectively in their Kata categories, and are both Olympic medalists, with Sánchez being the gold medalist in the female kata and Quintero the silver medalist in male kata at the 2020 Olympics. In addition, Sánchez is a multiple European and World champion in kata, as so is Quintero.

=== Swimming ===
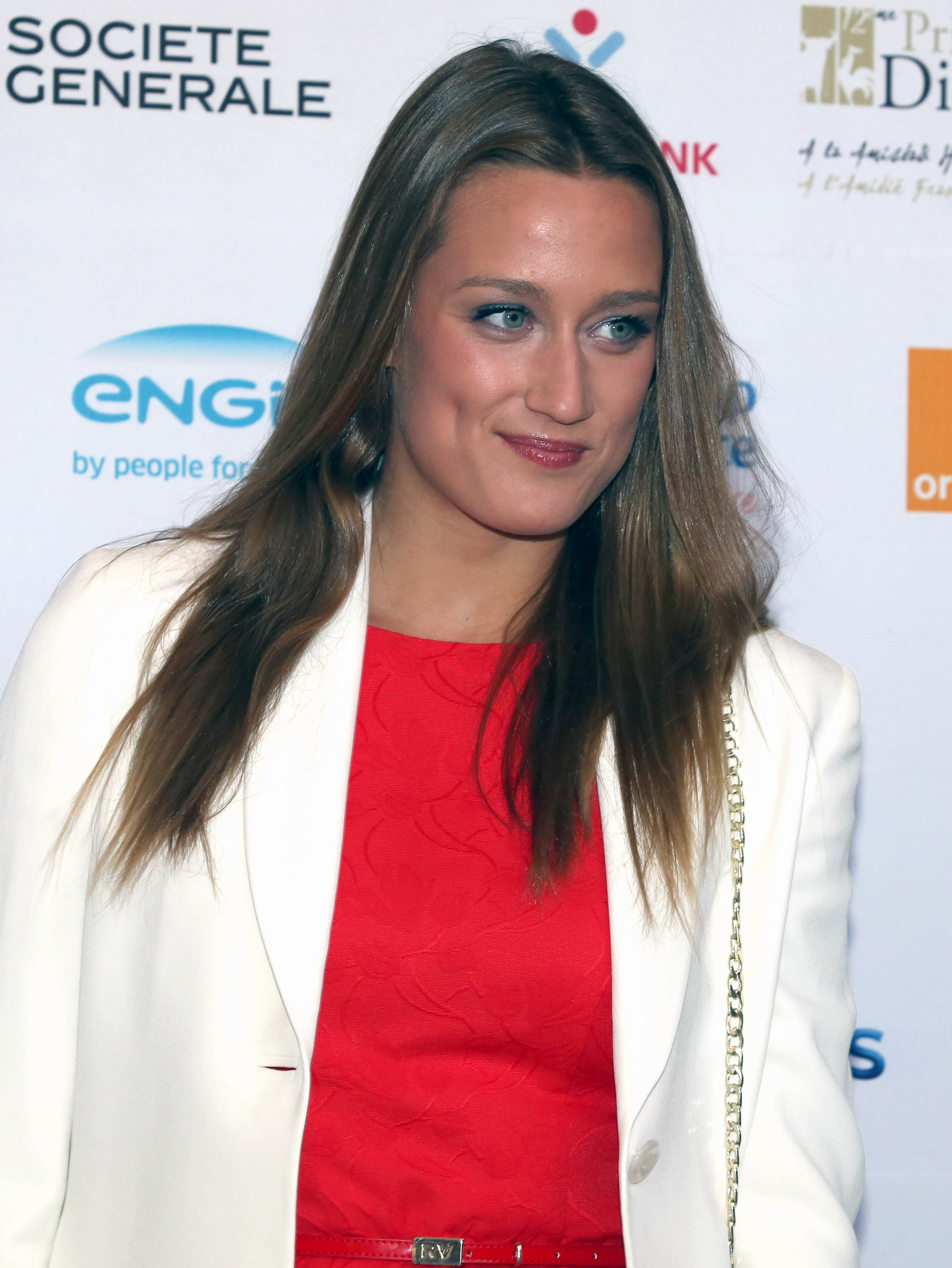
Mireia Belmonte, Spanish Olympic swimmer.

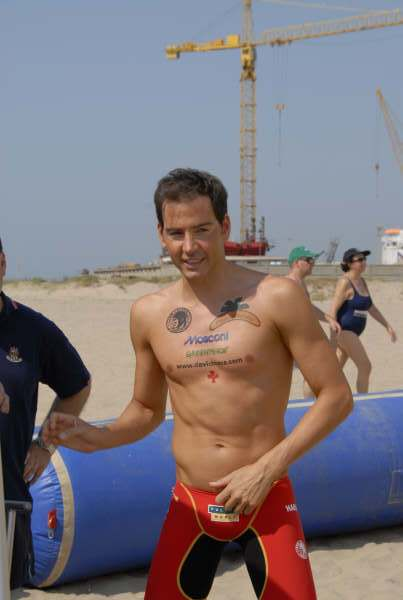
David Meca, long-distance swimmer

During the 2000s, Spanish swimmer Gemma Mengual has heralded a series of both individual and team medals for Spain in all the major international synchronized swimming tournaments, including the silver medal at the Beijing 2008 Olympics. Mengual's coach, Ana Tarrés, who herself represented Spain in the sport at the 1984 Summer Olympics, also served as coach of the national team from 1997 to 2012: during her time in charge the team enjoyed great success, taking four Olympic medals, 26 World Championship medals, and 25 European Championship medals. Other Spanish synchronised swimmers to enjoy success in international competition since the emergence of Mengual include Paola Tirados, Andrea Fuentes, the most decorated swimmer in the history of the Spain national team, Ona Carbonell and Margalida Crespí.

=== Skiing ===
Skiing is a popular sport. In the past, this sport was under development for economic reasons. However the improvement of the economy of Spain, helped skiing become an active sport event. It has become popular, and the skiing sites have been modernized in recent years. In Spain the southernmost ski resort of Europe, Sierra Nevada, is located. Skiing is one of the favourite sports of the Spanish Royal Family.

Spain has enjoyed some success in competitive alpine skiing. Skiers who have won races in the Alpine Skiing World Cup include Carolina Ruiz Castillo, María José Rienda, and siblings Blanca and Francisco Fernández Ochoa. The Fernández Ochoas are the only Spanish athletes to have won medals at the Winter Olympics, with Francisco winning a gold medal in the men's slalom in the 1972 Winter Olympics and Blanca winning a bronze in the women's equivalent twenty years later.

- Ski resorts in Spain

=== Sailing ===
Royal Spanish Sailing Federation

== Other sports ==
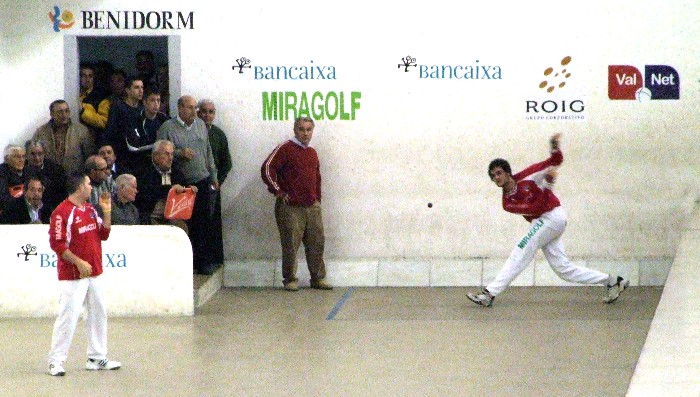
A game of pilota valenciana

=== Basque pelota ===
Basque pelota

=== Chess ===
Linares International Chess Tournament

=== Trainera ===
Kontxako Bandera

=== Valencian pelota ===
Valencian pilota is a traditional Valencian sports. Tournaments includes trinquete, Trofeu Individual Bancaixa, Circuit Bancaixa, raspall singles championship, and raspall team championship.

== Major sports facilities ==
=== Athletics stadiums ===
Image	Stadium	Capacity	City	Inaugurated	Big event
	Estadi Olímpic Lluís Companys	60,713	(Catalonia) Barcelona	1927	1992 Summer Olympics
	Estadio de La Cartuja (track is going to close until 2025)	57,619	(Andalusia) Seville	1999	1999 World Championships in Athletics

=== Bullfighting stadiums ===
Bullring	Location	Capacity	Image
Las Ventas	Madrid, Spain	23,798	
Plaza de Toros de Pamplona	Pamplona, Spain	19,720	
Plaza de Toros de La Merced	Huelva, Spain	15,000	
Plaza de Toros de Murcia	Murcia, Spain	15,000	
Plaza de Toros de Vista Alegre	Bilbao, Spain	14,781	
Plaza de Toros de Granada	Granada, Spain	14,000	
Plaza de Toros de los Califas	Córdoba, Spain	14,000	
Plaça de Bous de València	Valencia, Spain	12,000	
Plaza de Toros de Albacete	Albacete, Spain	12,000	
Plaza de Toros de la Real Maestranza de Caballería de Sevilla	Seville, Spain	12,000	
Plaza de Toros de La Ribera	Logroño, Spain	11,046	
Plaza de Toros de Valladolid	Valladolid, Spain	11,000	
Plaza de Toros de Las Palomas	Algeciras, Spain	11,000	
Plaza de Toros La Glorieta	Salamanca, Spain	10,858	
Plaza de Toros de Jaén	Jaén, Spain	10,500	
Plaza de Toros de Zaragoza	Zaragoza, Spain	10,072	
Plaza de Toros de Santander	Santander, Spain	10,000	
Plaza de Toros de Palencia	Palencia, Spain	10,000	
Plaza de Toros de Almería	Almería, Spain	10,000	

=== Football stadiums ===
The following is a list of stadiums with a capacity of at least 30,000.

Camp Nou	Santiago Bernabéu Stadium	Metropolitano Stadium	Estadio Benito Villamarín	Estadi Olímpic Lluís Companys
Barcelona	Madrid	Madrid	Seville	Barcelona
1982 FIFA World Cup	1982 FIFA World Cup	2019 UEFA Champions League Final	1982 FIFA World Cup	1992 Summer Olympic
Capacity: 105,000	Capacity: 83,186	Capacity: 70,692	Capacity: 60,721	Capacity: 55,926
Estadio de La Cartuja	Sport in Spain is located in Spain			San Mamés Stadium
Seville	Sport in Spain is located in Spain			Bilbao
UEFA Euro 2020	Sport in Spain is located in Spain			1982 FIFA World Cup Stadium
Capacity: 70,483	Sport in Spain is located in Spain			Capacity: 53,331
Mestalla Stadium	Sport in Spain is located in Spain			Ramón Sánchez Pizjuán Stadium
Valencia	Sport in Spain is located in Spain			Seville
1982 FIFA World Cup	Sport in Spain is located in Spain			1982 FIFA World Cup
Capacity: 49,430	Sport in Spain is located in Spain			Capacity: 42,714
RCDE Stadium	Anoeta Stadium	Estadio Manuel Martínez Valero	La Romareda	Estadio Riazor
Cornellà de Llobregat	San Sebastián	Elche	Zaragoza	A Coruña
	2020 UEFA Women's Champions League Final	1982 FIFA World Cup	1982 FIFA World Cup	1982 FIFA World Cup
Capacity: 40,500	Capacity: 40,000	Capacity: 31,388	Capacity: 33,608	Capacity: 32,490

=== Golf courses ===
Image	Course	Location	Opened	Length	Par	Course rating	Slope rating	Major events
	Valderrama Golf Club	(Andalusia) San Roque	1974	6,390 m (6,990 yd)	71	76.1	147	Ryder Cup: 1997

=== Indoor arenas ===
The following is a list of indoor stadiums in Spain, ordered by capacity.

Image	Stadium	Capacity	City	Autonomous Community	Team	Inaugurated
	Palau Sant Jordi	17,960	Barcelona	Catalonia	None	1990
	WiZink Center	17,453	Madrid	Madrid	Estudiantes; Real Madrid	2005
	Fernando Buesa Arena	15,504	Vitoria-Gasteiz	Basque Country	Baskonia	1991
	Bizkaia Arena	15,414	Barakaldo	Basque Country	None	2004
	Olímpic de Badalona	12,760	Badalona	Catalonia	Joventut Badalona	1991
	Caja Mágica	12,442	Madrid	Madrid	None	2009
	Gran Canaria Arena	11,470	Las Palmas	Canary Islands	CB Gran Canaria	2014
	Coliseum da Coruña	11,000	A Coruña	Galicia	None	1991
	Martín Carpena	11,000	Málaga	Andalusia	Unicaja	1999
	Donostia Arena	11,000	San Sebastián	Basque Country	Gipuzkoa Basket	1998
	Pabellón Príncipe Felipe	10,744	Zaragoza	Aragon	Basket Zaragoza	1990
	Madrid Arena	10,500	Madrid	Madrid	None	2002
	San Pablo	10,200	Sevilla	Andalusia	Baloncesto Sevilla	1999
	Bilbao Arena	10,014	Bilbao	Basque Country	Bilbao Basket	2010

=== Motosports circuits ===
Image	Race track	Location	Opened	Major events	Capacity
	Circuit de Barcelona-Catalunya	(Catalonia) Montmeló	1991	Spanish Grand Prix (Formula One); Catalan motorcycle Grand Prix (MotoGP); World Superbike	140,700
	MotorLand Aragón	(Aragon) Alcañiz	2009	Aragon motorcycle Grand Prix (MotoGP); World Superbike	129,500
	Circuito de Jerez – Ángel Nieto	(Andalusia) Jerez de la Frontera	1985	Spanish motorcycle Grand Prix (MotoGP); World Superbike	125,000
	Circuito Ricardo Tormo	(Valencian Community) Cheste	1999	Valencian Community motorcycle Grand Prix (MotoGP)	165,000
	Circuito de Navarra	(Navarre) Los Arcos	2010	World Superbike	

=== National stadiums ===
Image	Stadium	Capacity	City	Sport	Inaugurated
	Estadio Nacional Complutense	10,000	(Community of Madrid) Madrid	Rugby union	1943

=== Other stadiums ===
Image	Ground (sport)	Capacity	City	Inaugurated	Big event
	Estadio José Zorrilla (rugby)	27,846	(Castile and León) Valladolid	1982	1982 FIFA World Cup; Copa del Rey de Rugby: 2016, 2017
	Estadio Municipal de Chapín (equestrianism)	20,523	(Andalusia) Jerez de la Frontera	1988	2002 FEI World Equestrian Games
	Hipódromo de la Zarzuela (horse racing)	17,000	(Community of Madrid) Madrid	1941	1992 Summer Olympic Games
	Palau Blaugrana (various sports)	7,585	(Catalonia) Barcelona	1971	1992 Summer Olympic Games
	Palacio de Deportes de Murcia (futsal)	7,454	(Region of Murcia) Murcia	1994	1996 FIFA Futsal World Championship
	Palacio Multiusos de Guadalajara (handball)	5,894	(Castilla–La Mancha) Guadalajara	2010	2013 World Men's Handball Championship
	Centro Insular de Deportes (volleyball)	5,200	(Canary Islands) Las Palmas	5,200	Copa del Rey de Voleibol
	Pazo dos Deportes de Riazor (rink hockey)	4,425	(Galicia (Spain)) A Coruña	1970	Roller Hockey World Cup: 1988, 1972
	Piscina Municipal de Montjuïc (swimming)	4,100	(Catalonia) Barcelona	1929	1992 Summer Olympic Games; 2003 World Aquatics Championships; 2013 World Aquatics Championships
	Bizkaia frontoia (basque pelota)	3,000	(Basque Country (autonomous community)) Bilbao	2011	Bare-handed Pelota First League

=== Rugby union stadiums ===
Image	Stadium	Capacity	City	Tenants	Inaugurated
	Fadura estadioa	6,000	(Basque Country (autonomous community)) Getxo	Getxo RT	2022
	Estadio Pepe Rojo	5,000	(Castile and León) Valladolid	CR El Salvador; Valladolid RAC	1981
	Estadi Baldiri Aleu	4,000	(Catalonia) Sant Boi de Llobregat	UE Santboiana	1950
	Instalaciones deportivas La Cartuja	1,932	(Andalusia) Seville	Ciencias Sevilla CR	1999
	Miniestadio de Anoeta	1,262	(Basque Country (autonomous community)) San Sebastián	Bera Bera RT	1993

=== Ski resorts ===
Alpine skiing

Image	Resort	Location	Skiable area	Pistes
	Alp 2500 (La Molina and Masella)	(Catalonia) Cerdanya	72 km	135
	Sierra Nevada Ski Station	(Andalusia) Sierra Nevada	108 km	115
	Baqueira-Beret	(Catalonia) Alt Pirineu i Aran	161 km	99
	Formigal Ski Resort	(Aragon) Tena Valley	176 km	90
	Cerler	(Aragon) Benasque Valley	72 km	65

Nordic skiing

Image	Resort	Location	Skiable area	Pistes
	Sant Joan de l'Erm	(Catalonia) Alt Urgell	50 km	5
	Lles	(Catalonia) Cerdanya	35 km	5
	Tuixent – la Vansa	(Catalonia) Alt Urgell	32.3 km	5
	Aransa	(Catalonia) Cerdanya	32 km	5
	Guils Fontanera	(Catalonia) Cerdanya	29 km	6

=== Velodromes ===
Image	Stadium	Capacity	City	Inaugurated	Big events
	Las Mestas Sports Complex	10,000	(Asturias) Gijón	1942	
	Palma Arena	6,607	(Balearic Islands) Palma de Mallorca	2007	2007 UCI Track Cycling World Championships
	Velódromo Luis Puig	6,500	(Valencian Community) Valencia	1992	1992 UCI Track Cycling World Championships
	Velódromo de Anoeta	5,500	(Basque Country (autonomous community)) San Sebastián	1965	1965 UCI Track Cycling World Championships
	Velòdrom d'Horta	3,200	(Catalonia) Barcelona	1984	1992 Summer Olympics; 1984 UCI Track Cycling World Championships

== See also ==
- Football in Spain
- Lists of stadiums
