= Lles =

Lles may refer to:

- Lles (municipality), a municipality in Catalonia, officially named "Lles de Cerdanya" in Catalan
  - Lles (ski resort)
- Ein Shemer Airfield (ICAO: LLES)

== See also ==
- Iles
- , the French term for "islands"
