= Iles =

Iles is a surname. Notable people with the surname include:

- Albert Iles (1914–1979), English footballer
- Alex Iles, American musician
- Bob Iles (born 1955), English footballer
- Bradley Iles (born 1983), New Zealand golfer
- Brian Iles, American animation writer
- Clay Iles (1942–2026), British tennis player and coach
- Edna Iles (1905–2003), English classical pianist
- Elijah Iles (1796–1883), American pioneer and businessman
- Francis Iles (1893–1971), English crime writer (real name: Anthony Berkeley Cox)
- Greg Iles (1960–2025), American writer
- James Iles (born 1990), English cricketer
- Jeremy Iles (born 1957), environmental campaigner
- Jon Iles (born 1954), English actor
- Nikki Iles (born 1963), English musician
- Ray K Iles, British scientist
- Richard Iles (born 1962), English musician
- Salim Iles (born 1975), Algerian swimmer
- Sam Iles (born 1987), Australian footballer

== See also ==
- Iles, Nariño, town and municipality in Colombia
- , the French term for "islands"
- Lles (disambiguation)
