= 2019 Roller Hockey African Championship =

The 2019 Roller Hockey African Championship was the first edition of this tournament, played in Angola between 8 and 10 March 2019.

This tournament was played independently served as qualifier for the 2019 Roller Hockey World Cup, by giving only one place to the World Cup and two more for the Intercontinental Cup, second tier.

Angola conquered the first edition, contested by only three teams due to the refusal of South Africa.

== Standings ==
Pos	Team	Pld	W	D	L	GF	GA	GD	Pts	Qualification	(Angola)	(Mozambique)	(Egypt)
1	Angola (H, C)	2	2	0	0	35	3	+32	6	Qualification to the World Cup	—	5–3	—
2	Mozambique	2	1	0	1	15	7	+8	3	Qualification to the Intercontinental Cup	—	—	12–2
3	Egypt	2	0	0	2	2	42	−40	0	Qualification to the Intercontinental Cup	0–30	—	—

(C) Champions; (H) Hosts
