= Roller Hockey African Championship =

Sporting tournament

The Roller Hockey African Championship is the main roller hockey tournament in Africa, organised by World Skate Africa and contested by the best African national teams.

The first edition was contested in 2019 and served as qualifier for the World Cup.

== Results ==
Edition	(gold) Champion	(silver) Runner-up	(bronze) Third
Luanda, Angola 2019	Angola	Mozambique	Egypt
Cairo, Egypt 2023	Angola	Egypt	South Africa
Luanda, Angola 2025	Angola	Mozambique	Egypt
