= 2018 Roller Hockey Pan American Championship =

The 2018 Roller Hockey Pan American Championship was the ninth edition of this tournament, played in Bogotá, Colombia between 4 and 9 December 2018.

This was the first time that the tournament was played independently from the Pan American Games and also the first time that served as qualifier for the 2019 Roller Hockey World Cup, by giving only three place to the World Cup and one more for the Intercontinental Cup, second tier.

Argentina conquered their eight title ever, the seventh consecutive.

== Standings ==
Pos	Team	Pld	W	D	L	GF	GA	GD	Pts	Qualification	(Argentina)	(Chile)	(Colombia)	(Brazil)	(United States)	(Uruguay)	(Mexico)
1	Argentina	6	6	0	0	50	1	+49	18	Qualification to the semifinals	—	3–0	4–0	8–1		9–0	19–0
2	Chile	6	5	0	1	44	9	+35	15	Qualification to the semifinals		—	2–1	2–3		12–2	19–0
3	Colombia	6	4	0	2	38	8	+30	12	Qualification to the semifinals			—		6–0	9–0	19–0
4	Brazil	6	3	0	3	25	18	+7	9	Qualification to the semifinals			2–3	—	5–3		9–0
5	United States	6	1	1	4	13	29	−16	4		0–7	8–1			—		7–1
6	Uruguay	6	1	1	4	11	39	−28	4	Qualification to sixth place match				6–1	2–2	—	
7	Mexico	6	0	0	6	2	79	−77	0	Qualification to sixth place match						1–6	—

Source: CBHP

== Sixth place game ==
Team 1	Score	Team 2
Uruguay	8–2	Mexico

== Final bracket ==
=== Bracket ===
Semi-finals
Argentina	8
Brazil	1
Chile	4
Colombia	0

Final
Argentina	2
Chile	1
Third place
Colombia	7
Brazil	2
