= Trinquete =

Trinquete (in Spanish) or trinquet (in Catalan and French) can refer to the popular and shortened names for two different ball game courtfields:

- Basque trinquete, a court for various indoor versions of pelota with some of the features of a real tennis court
- Valencian trinquet, a court used in the Valencian Community for two different modalities of Valencian pilota
