= Ray Iles =

Biomedical scientist

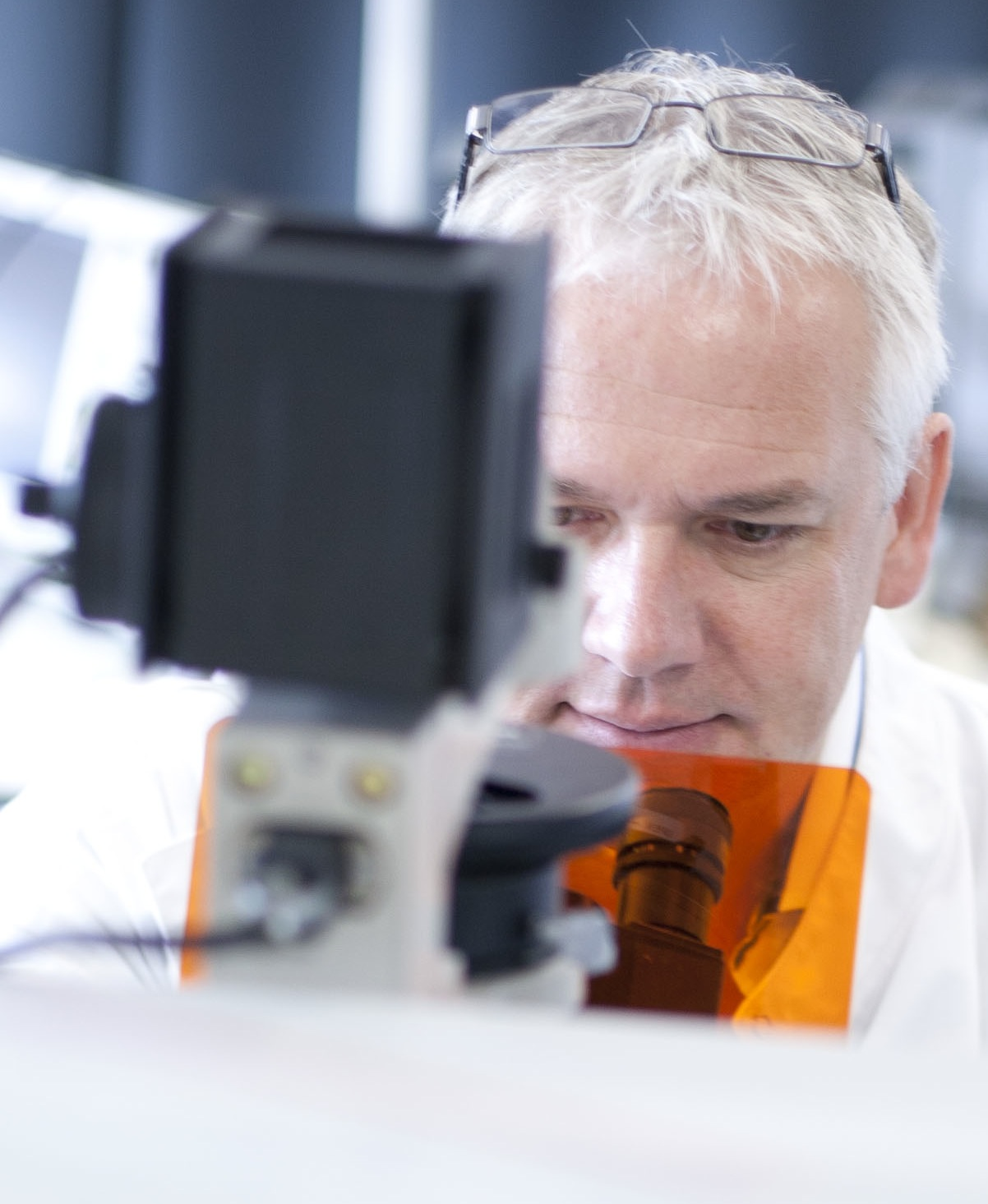
Iles working in his laboratory

Ray Kruse Iles is a biomedical scientist who was head of the Williamson Laboratory for Molecular Oncology at St Bartholomew's Hospital in London.

== Career ==
Iles has a particular interest in the interface between rational processing, emotional motivation and endocrinology.

He co-founded the ELK-Health Foundation, with psychotherapist Tadhg Ó Séaghdha, in 2004. The ELK-Foundation Health (named after Iles's father, Eric Leonard Kruse) is now the National Institutes for Stress, Anxiety and Depression (NISAD), centred in Lund, Sweden. It still uses the ELK-Health name in its programmes and clinics, which support people needing to change habits that harm their physical and emotional health.

Iles's interest in women's and reproductive health led him, in 2011, to become the founding director of the biomarker diagnostic company MAPSciences.

Iles is the inventor of new diagnostic technology, six clinical screening tests for pregnancy disorders and Down syndrome/prenatal diagnosis, haemoglobinopathies, thalassemia, and diabetes, and two cancer-related patents.

His academic career, after leaving St Bartholomew's, included being Professor of Biomedical Science at Middlesex University heading a Biomedical Science Research Facility, which incorporated molecular pathology, bio-modelling/bioinformatics and environmental health, and then Anglia Ruskin University.

Formerly a regular contributor to Kumar and Clark's Clinical Medicine, Iles left academia to concentrate on the two organisations that he co-founded, NISAD and MapSciences.

In 2012, with Suzanne Docherty, he published the textbook Biomedical Science: Essential Laboratory Medicine.

NISAD has supported several research projects of Iles and his students in bioanalysis, cancer research, fertility and prenatal care and child development.

In 2019 Iles became founding dean at Abu Dhabi University’s College of Health Sciences. In July 2020 he became visiting professor at the Laboratory of Viral Zoonotics, University of Cambridge.

== Personal life ==
As a boy Iles attended Mellow Lane Comprehensive School in Hayes, Middlesex.

His cousin is the UK Olympic fencer Richard Kruse, which was the subject of the BBC Radio programme Tracing your Roots.
