= Lles (ski resort) =

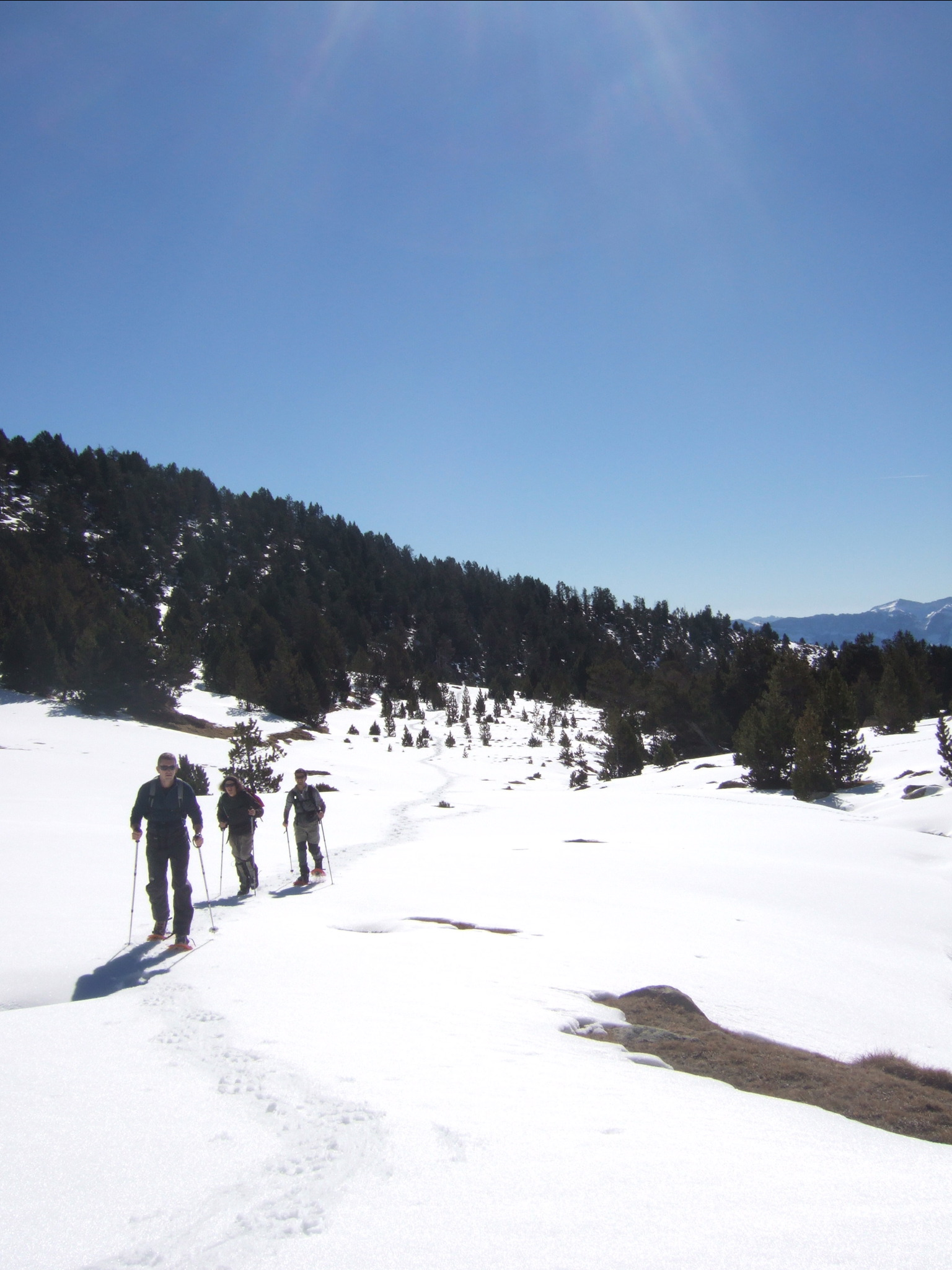
- Interactive map of Lles
- Nearest city: Lles de Cerdanya, Spain
- Coordinates: 42°25′52″N 1°40′5″E
- Top elevation: 2,335
- Base elevation: 1,900
- Trails: Nordic skiing Black circuit: 3 km Red circuit : 6 km Blue circuit: 8 km Green circuit: 11 km Skating circuit: 13 km
- Website: website

Lles ski resort is located in Lles de Cerdanya, Catalonia, north-eastern Spain. Lles is crossed by the Orri stream, where Orri lake pitches, on the foot of Tossa Plana de Lles (2,916 m).

The resort opened in 1970. All together has 35 km of trails for skiing located between elevations of 1,900 and 2,335 m. They are divided according to difficulty:

- Green circuit: 11 km
- Blue circuit: 8 km
- Red circuit: 6 km
- Black circuit: 3 km
- Skating circuit: 13 km

Also has a circuit for walkers and snowshoeing. The green circuit of Autopista passes through the refuge of Pradell and connects with Aransa ski resort. In this circuit Lles-Aransa takes place the Pyrenees Walk, a Cross-country skiing competition held every year at the beginning of the year.
