= Lles de Cerdanya =

- Municipality
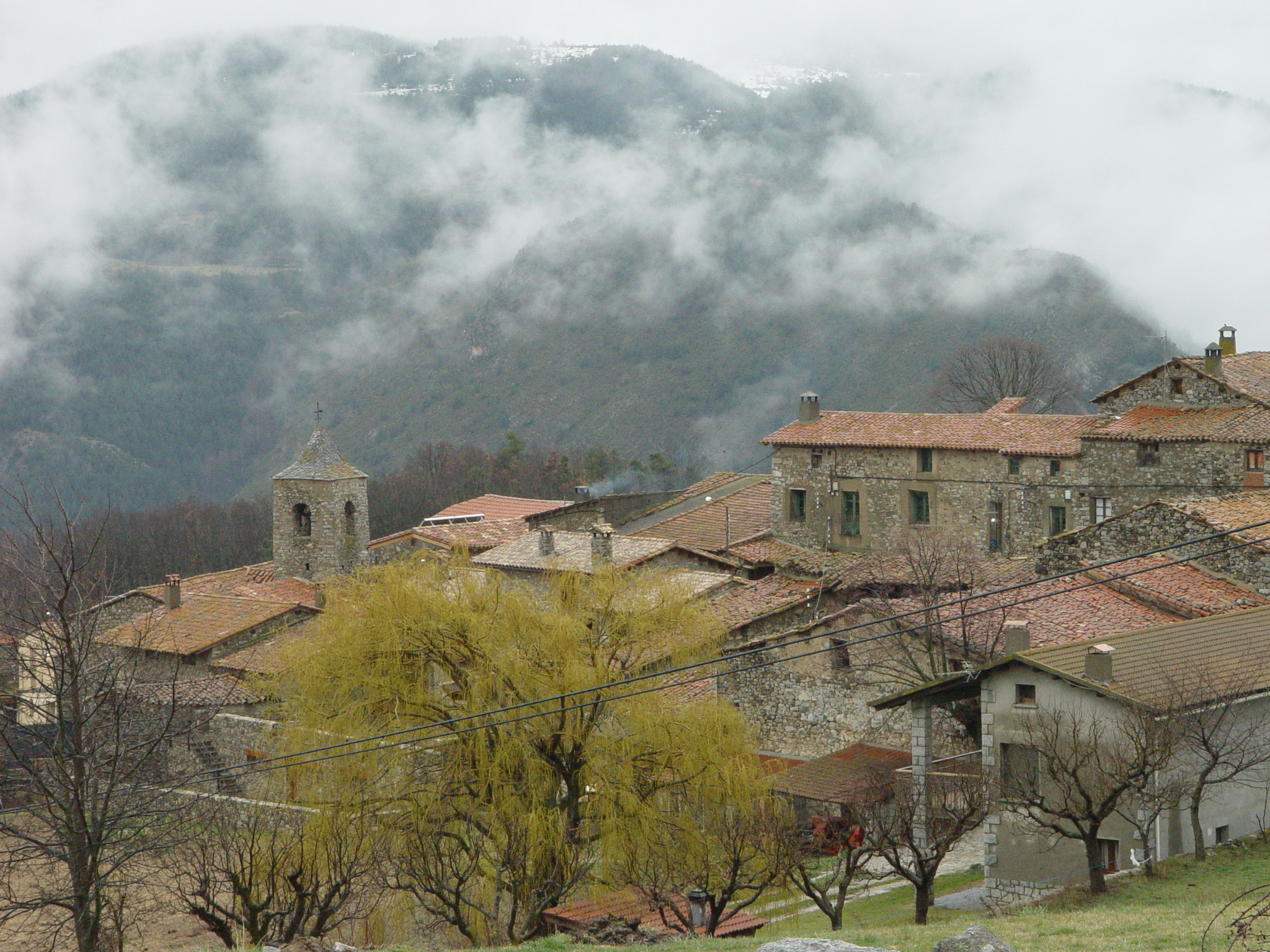
- Travesseres

- Coat of arms

- Location in Catalonia Lles de Cerdanya (Catalonia) Lles de Cerdanya (Spain)
- Coordinates: 42°23′32″N 1°41′17″E
- Country: Spain
- Autonomous community: Catalonia
- Province: Lleida
- Comarca: Cerdanya

Government
  - Mayor: Andreu Grau Ginesta (2015)

Area
  - Total: 102.8 km^{2} (39.7 sq mi)
- Elevation: 1,471 m (4,826 ft)

Population (2025-01-01)
  - Total: 290
  - Density: 2.8/km^{2} (7.3/sq mi)
- Time zone: UTC+1 (CET)
  - Summer (DST): UTC+2 (CEST)
- Postal code: 25726
- Website: lles.ddl.net

Lles de Cerdanya (Catalan pronunciation: [ˈʎɛz ðə səɾˈðaɲə]; formerly known as simply Lles, [ˈʎɛs]) is a Pyrrenean village in the comarca of Cerdanya, province of Lleida, Catalonia, north-eastern Spain. It is located south of the border with Andorra and France and home to two ski resorts, Lles and Aransa. It has a population of 290 (register office, 2025).

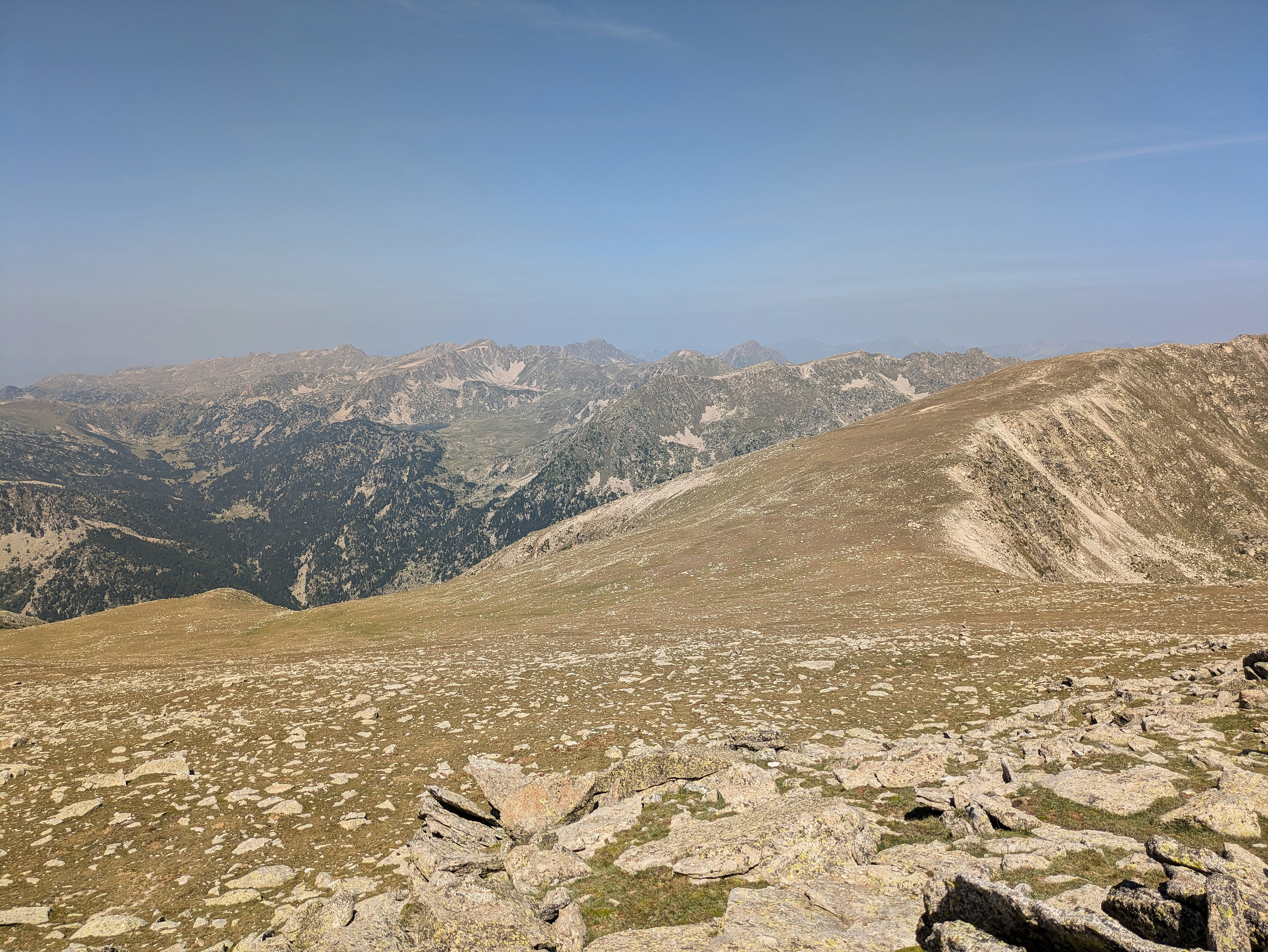
Scenery in the northernmost part of the municipality's territory. The mountains in the distance are in Andorra.
