= Bob Iles =

English footballer

Personal information
- Full name: Robert John Iles
- Date of birth: 2 September 1955 (age 71)
- Place of birth: Leicester, England
- Position: Goalkeeper

Senior career*
Years	Team	Apps	(Gls)
1973–1975	Bournemouth	0	(0)
1976–1977	Poole Town	?	(?)
1977–1978	Weymouth	?	(?)
1978–1983	Chelsea	14	(0)
1983–1987	Wealdstone	139	(1)
1987–1989	Yeovil Town	?	(?)
1989–1990	Bashley	?	(?)
- * Club domestic league appearances and goals

Robert John Iles (born 2 September 1955) is an English former professional footballer who played in the Football League, as a goalkeeper.

Born in Leicester, Iles joined Chelsea for £10,000 in June 1978 from Southern League Weymouth and made 14 League appearances for the club. His first team opportunities at Chelsea were limited by the form of Peter Bonetti, Petar Borota and Steve Francis. Iles signed for non-league Wealdstone in 1983.
