= Aransa =

Ski resort in Catalonia, Spain

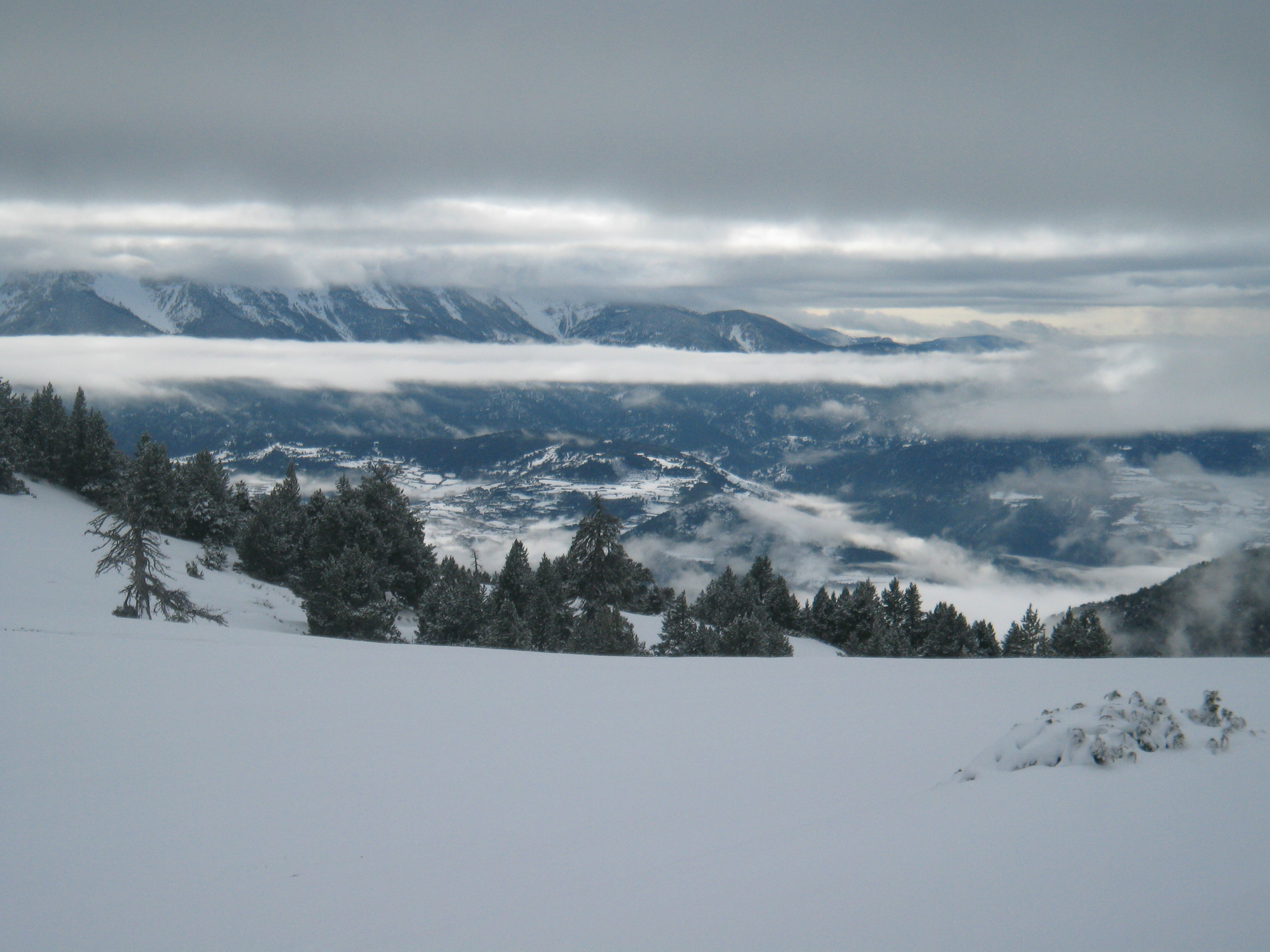
- Interactive map of Aransa
- Location: Arànser
- Nearest major city: Lles de Cerdanya, Catalonia
- Coordinates: 42°25′12″N 1°38′24″E
- Top elevation: 2,150 metres (7,050 ft)
- Base elevation: 1,850 metres (6,070 ft)
- Trails: Nordic skiing Black circuit: 5 km Red circuit : 10 km Blue circuit: 7,5 km Green circuit: 5 km Racquets circuit: 8 km 32 km Total
- Website: www.aransaski.cat

Aransa, opened in 1986, is a Catalan ski resort located in Arànser, municipality of Lles de Cerdanya.

Surrounded by the mountains of Tossa Plana de Lles at 2,916 metres (9,567 ft) and Pic de Sirvent at 2,836 metres (9,304 ft), the resort is in the basin where the Lakes of the Pera pitch to Segre River.

There are 32 kilometres (20 mi) of trails for cross-country skiing located from 1,850 to 2,150 metres (6,070 to 7,050 ft) in elevation.

- Green circuit: 5 km
- Blue circuit: 7.5 km
- Red circuit: 10 km
- Black circuit: 5 km
- Ride circuit: 8 km

The red circuit, El Mirador, reaches the highest point with an excellent view on the comarques of Alt Urgell and Cerdanya and over the Cadí Range.
