= María Pardo (gymnast) =

Spanish rhythmic gymnast

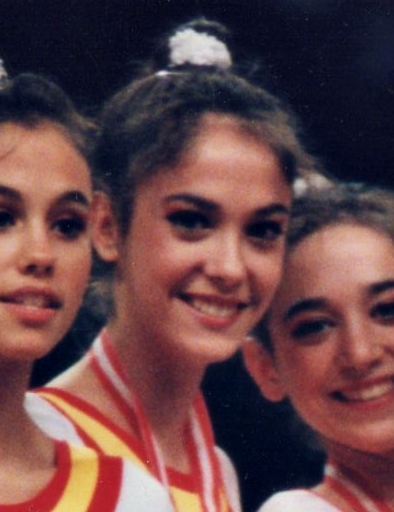

Personal information
- Full name: María Pardo Rojo
- Born: 6 June 1979 (age 47) Torrelavega, Spain

Gymnastics career
- Discipline: Rhythmic gymnastics
- Country represented: Spain (1994-1996)
- Club: Club Cantabria
- Head coach: Emilia Boneva
- Assistant coach: Ana Roncero
- Retired: yes
Medal record
Rhythmic Gymnastics
Representing Spain
| Event | 1st | 2nd | 3rd |
|---|---|---|---|
| European Championships | 0 | 1 | 2 |
| World Championships | 2 | 3 | 0 |
| Total | 2 | 4 | 2 |
World Championships
| Gold medal – first place | 1995 Vienna | 3 balls/2 ribbons |
| Silver medal – second place | 1994 Paris | Group All-around |
| Silver medal – second place | 1995 Vienna | Group All-around |
| Silver medal – second place | 1995 Vienna | 5 hoops |
| Bronze medal – third place | 1994 Paris | 6 Ropes |
| Bronze medal – third place | 1994 Paris | 4 Hoops + 2 Clubs |
European Championships
| Silver medal – second place | 1995 Prague | 3 Balls + 2 Ribbons |
| Bronze medal – third place | 1995 Prague | All-Around |
| Bronze medal – third place | 1995 Prague | 5 Hoops |

María Pardo Rojo (born 6 June 1979) is a former Spanish rhythmic gymnast. From 1994 to 1996 he won numerous medals in World and European Championships and other international competitions. She holds the silver medal for Sports Merit of the Government of Cantabria (2017) and a sports pavilion in Torrelavega has been named after him since 2016.

== Biography ==
Pardo took up gymnastics at the Club Cantabria, where she remained until 1994 when she was called up to join the national team. One of her coaches was former national gymnast Silvia Yustos.

In 1994, she was called by Emilia Boneva to be part of the national team as a member of the group. During this time she lived with the rest of the team members in a chalet in Canillejas and trained at the Moscardó Gymnasium from Monday to Saturday, first about 6 hours and then up to 8 hours a day in the year before the Olympic Games, when they stopped going to school.

In October 1994, although as a substitute, she participated in her first international competition, the World Championships in Paris, winning silver in the All-Around and two bronzes in the 6 ropes and the 4 hoops & 2 clubs finals. In the All-Around the Spanish group was only surpassed by the Russian. They obtained a total score of 38,700, about 225 thousandths short of gold, after having had a score of 19,350 in each of the two exercises. In the two finals by apparatuses they were surpassed by Russia and Bulgaria. In that occasion the group was composed by Marta Baldó, Lorena Barbadillo, Paula Cabo, Estela Giménez, Regina Guati and Amaia Uriondo, with Violeta Giménez also as the other alternate. At the end of the season most of them retired.

From the end of 1994 to the beginning of 1995, gymnasts such as Dilayla Romeo, Estíbaliz Martínez, Tania Lamarca and Nuria Cabanillas joined the group, with María, Estela Giménez, Marta Baldó and Maider Esparza remaining. Pardo then became a starting gymnast in both routines. That year the number of gymnasts performing in the group modality decreased to five, instead of the previous six. In April 1995 they debuted at the Portimão International Tournament and they won bronze in both the All-Around and in the 5 hoops final. The following week the Karlsruhe tournament saw Spain 6th in the All-Around, due to a bad score with 5 hoops, in addition to the 6th place in the mixed apparatus final. Due to this poor performance, María Fernández and Emilia Boneva made some modifications in the rooster, placing Tania as a starter instead of Maider Esparza. Later they would participate in various tournaments and exhibitions in Corbeil-Essonnes, Manresa, Alicante or Liévin.

In July she competed in the 1995 European Championships in Prague, there the group won bronze in the All-Around and with 5 hoops, silver with 3 balls and 2 ribbons. In the All-Around the group got a cumulative score of 38,625, thus obtaining the third place behind Bulgaria and Russia, who took the silver and gold medal respectively. That third place also gave them the qualification for the finals by apparatuses the next day, there in the mixed routine they were only 7 thousandths short of the first position, taken by Bulgaria. With 5 hoops they were again third, surpassed by Russians and Bulgarians.

In late September Pardo joined Marta Baldó, Nuria Cabanillas, Estela Giménez, Tania Lamarca, Estíbaliz Martínez and Maider Esparza as the substitute at the World Championships in Vienna, where they took the silver medal in the All-Around and with 5 hoops, and gold with 3 balls and 2 ribbons. That second place earned the team automatic qualification for the joint competition at the Atlanta Olympics, which would be held a year later.

By 1996 the group modality made its debut at the Olympic Games, which would be held that year in Atlanta. The groups members stopped going to their school, the private Nuestra Señora de Altagracia center, to concentrate on the preparation of the Olympic event. For the new season the music of the new 5 hoops exercise was a medley of several songs belonging to American musicals, mainly "America", composed by Leonard Bernstein and included in West Side Story, "I Got Rhythm" and "Embraceable You", themes created by George Gershwin and part of the soundtrack of An American in Paris. For the routine with 3 balls & 2 ribbons they chose "Andalucian Dawn", a theme that Carmen Acedo had already used in her 1991 rope exercise, although with other arrangements.

In November 1995, the Spanish group traveled to Tokyo to participate in the annual Epson Cup tournament, in which the two best groups of the year competed with the Japanese. In December a display of the entire Spanish team took place at the High Performance Center of Sierra Nevada (Granada).

During the first half of 1996, the group participated in various preparatory competitions, such as the Kalamata Cup, Karlsruhe and Corbeil ones, in which they would always win medals. In April, since the Karlsruhe tournament, Maria started making some mistakes in throws. In early May they received at the Moscardó Gym the visit of the prestigious Cuban dancer and choreographer Alicia Alonso, who taught them in a master class. That same month, shortly after the tournament in Corbeil in which she decided not to participate, Maria left the national team because, according to her words, she couldn't stand the pressure to which she was subjected at that time. Her retirement also led to a break in his relationship with Jesús Carballo. The Atlanta Olympic Games were two months away.

Months later, in October, after the win of the gold medal by the Spanish group in Atlanta, Maria made some statements in the newspaper El País in which she said that the then coach Emilia Boneva was extremely hard with food and training. Her statements were supported by some former members of the group, while the then gymnasts of the Spanish team said that Maria did not tell the whole truth in some respects. Years later some of them publicly acknowledged the veracity of her allegations. On September 13, 1999, Maria appeared in the Senate to tell her experience in a paper on the extrasanitary conditions of anorexia and bulimia.

On 21 December 2011, she gave birth to girl named Martina.

In November 2015 it was announced that the Rio Viar Pavilion in Torrelavega would be renamed María Pardo. The official act of imposing the name took place on 12 February 2016, Maria discovered a commemorative plaque in the presence of family, friends, compañeras and students of the Sports School, and personalities such as the mayor of Torrelavega José Manuel Cruz, the Councillor for Sports Jesús Sánchez, Jesús Carballo president of the Royal Spanish Gymnastics Federation and Africa Alvarez, president of the Cantabrian Gymnastics Federation.

Currently María trains the Torrelavega Municipal Sports School of rhythmic gymnastics and the Municipal Sports School of Santoña (also Club Santogym) among other Cantabrian schools.
