= Maider Esparza =

Spanish rhythmic gymnast

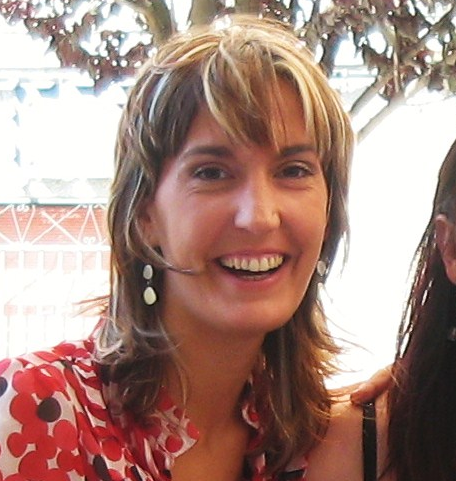

Personal information
- Full name: Maider Esparza Elizalde
- Born: 28 April 1979 (age 47) Pamplona, Spain

Gymnastics career
- Discipline: Rhythmic gymnastics
- Country represented: Spain (1994-1996)
- Club: Club Natación Pamplona
- Head coach: Emilia Boneva
- Assistant coach: Ana Roncero
- Retired: yes
Medal record
Rhythmic Gymnastics
Representing Spain
Event	1st	2nd	3rd
European Championships	0	1	2
World Championships	2	3	0
Total	2	4	2
World Championships
Gold medal – first place	1995 Vienna	3 balls/2 ribbons
Silver medal – second place	1995 Vienna	Group All-around
Silver medal – second place	1995 Vienna	5 hoops
European Championships
Silver medal – second place	1995 Prague	3 Balls + 2 Ribbons
Bronze medal – third place	1995 Prague	All-Around
Bronze medal – third place	1995 Prague	5 Hoops

Maider Esparza Elizalde (born 28 April 1979) is a former Spanish rhythmic gymnast, who was a substitute for the two-time world champion and gold medalist at the 1996 Atlanta Olympic Games national group, although for that event only the six starting gymnasts were allowed to be called up.

== Personal life ==
She has two children: a girl, Naia, who also practices rhythmic gymnastics, and a boy, Oier.

== Biography ==
Maider began her activity as a gymnast at the Club Natación Pamplona, following two of her cousins that already practised the sport. In 1993 she was 4th in clubs in the Spanish Individual Championship "B" in Valencia, and that same year she participated in the Spanish Group Championship in Gijón, being 4th in first category with Natación Pamplona.

In 1994, she was called by Emilia Boneva to be part of the national team as a member of the group. During this time she lived with the rest of the team members in a chalet in Canillejas and trained at the Moscardó Gymnasium from Monday to Saturday, first about 6 hours and then up to 8 hours a day in the year before the Olympic Games, when they stopped going to school.

In October 1994 she became a starter, making her competition debut at the Portimão International Tournament in April 1995, where she won bronze in both the All-Around and the 5 hoops final. After the Karlsruhe tournament, her second competition as a starter, she was the substitute gymnast in most of the competitions in which the Spanish group participated. As the team's substitute gymnast, Maider had to learn each of the parts in the two exercises, so that in the event of a starter's injury, she could replace her.

In July 1995 she won bronze in the All-Around and with 5 hoops, silver with 2 balls and 3 ribbons at the European Championships in Prague. In September, as a substitute, she won silver in the All-Around and with 5 hoops, gold with 3 balls and 2 ribbons at the World Championships in Vienna. In June 1996 Spain won silver in the All-Around and gold with 3 balls and 2 ribbons at the European Championships in Budapest.

For the Atlanta Olympic Games only the team's six starting gymnasts could participate, so Maider was left out, although she did travel to watch the competition live. The group made up of Marta Baldó, Nuria Cabanillas, Estela Giménez, Lorena Guréndez, Tania Lamarca and Estíbaliz Martínez won an historical gold ahead of Bulgaria and Russia. After this achievement, the group was baptized by the media as the Niñas de Oro. She was also awarded the Gold Plate of the Royal Order of Sports Merit (1996) and the Barón de Güell Cup at the National Sports Awards (1997), distinctions awarded to the Spanish rhythmic gymnastics team by the Higher Sports Council.

Esparza retired in September 1996, after the Games. On December 22 of that year, she received a tribute in Pamplona from the Navarra Gymnastics Federation. In it, the Spanish group put on an exhibition and the group and trainers were presented with a replica of the Atlanta gold medal. Years later, at the presentation in Pamplona of the book Lágrimas por una medalla by her colleague Tania Lamarca, Maider would comment that for her the retirement "was a relief [...] The worst thing for me was the pressure of being concentrated in Madrid. In Pamplona I felt good. In the same appearance she demanded "that the work done by the gymnasts who are there even if they are not seen be recognized, because they all do the same work with the same effort."

On August 5, 2000, she participated along with some of her former teammates from the national team in a tribute to Emilia Boneva during the Spanish Rhythmic Gymnastics Group Championships held in Malaga, in which they performed an exercise set up especially for the occasion that was inspired in the 1996 5 hoops and that they had trained the previous weeks with the help of Ana Bautista. Emilia herself traveled from Bulgaria to attend the event, although she was unaware that several of her former pupils were going to pay tribute to her. Marta Baldó was not able to participate in the event and Lorena Guréndez attended but she did not perform the exercise as she was still a member of the national team. The person in charge of organizing the reunion was Carlos Pérez, then External Relations of the ADO Program, after the girls themselves told him about the idea. Days later they would carry out the exercise again in Manzanares el Real, this being the last time they met Emilia again.

In April 2002, the members of the 1996 group met again at the V Interschool Rhythmic Gymnastics Competition, which was organized by MT in Zaragoza and where five of them performed one of the Atlanta exercises, in addition to receiving a tribute. Nuria Cabanillas and Lorena Guréndez were not able to attend the week in which the exercise was trained, but they did attend the event.

In August 2006, along with the rest of her former teammates from the 1996 national team, she attended a reunion that took place in Ávila for three days on the occasion of the tenth anniversary of winning the gold medal in Atlanta. Organised by Carlos Beltrán with his production company, Klifas dreams, with the aim of recording a documentary in which they themselves narrated their story. Las Niñas de Oro, as it was called, premiered on YouTube in December 2013, directed by Beltrán himself and lasting 54 minutes. It was presented divided into five parts. The documentary narrates, through interviews with the gymnasts themselves, the before, during and after of the gold medal in Atlanta.

On November 8, 2014, the seven members of the 1996 group, including Maider, were honored at the IX Euskalgym Gala, which was held for the first time in Vitoria. In the same, a projection of images was carried out on, consisting of the names of the gymnasts with the logo of the 1996 Atlanta Olympic Games and the gold medal in the background, while the music of their hoops exercise played in that Olympics. Next, the seven gymnasts took to the carpet to present them with the Euskalgym Medal and receive a commemorative plaque from the hands of José Luis Tejedor and Javier Maroto, president of the Basque Gymnastics Federation and mayor of Vitoria respectively, in the presence of the almost 9,000 people attended the gala at the Fernando Buesa Arena. It was the first time since 2006 all the Niñas de Oro were together. On October 14, 2015, the seven Niñas de Oro met again in Madrid as the six Olympic champions were awarded the Gold Medal of the Royal Order of Sports Merit, awarded by the Higher Sports Council. At the same event, the Bronze Medal was presented to the Spanish team of 2014, known as Equipaso, being the first time that both generations of gymnasts met.

On July 23, 2016, she was reunited with the rest of the group at the 20th Anniversary Gala of the gold medal in Atlanta '96, which took place at the Badajoz Congress Palace within the framework of the X International Campus of Nuria Cabanillas Rhythmic Gymnastics. Several former gymnasts of the national team also attended the tribute, such as Carolina Pascual, Almudena Cid, Alba Caride, Ana Bautista, Carolina Malchair, Marta Calamonte, María Eugenia Rodríguez and Ana María Pelaz, as well as the international judge Maite Nadal and the choreographer of the Atlanta group, Marisa Mateo. The national junior group also performed two exhibitions during the gala, which also featured performances by Carolina Pascual and the Campus participants. A recorded message from former coach Emilia Boneva was also broadcast from her home in Bulgaria.

In September 2018, she traveled with several former gymnasts from the Spanish team to the World Championships in Sofia to meet again with the former national team coach Emilia Boneva, and a tribute dinner was also organized in her honor. After Boneva's death on 20 September 2019, Maider and other former national gymnasts gathered to pay tribute to her during the Euskalgym held on 16 November 2019, the event took place before 8,500 attendees at the Bilbao Exhibition Center de Baracaldo and was followed by a dinner in her honor.
