= Violeta Giménez =

Spanish rhythmic and acrobatic gymnast (born 1978)

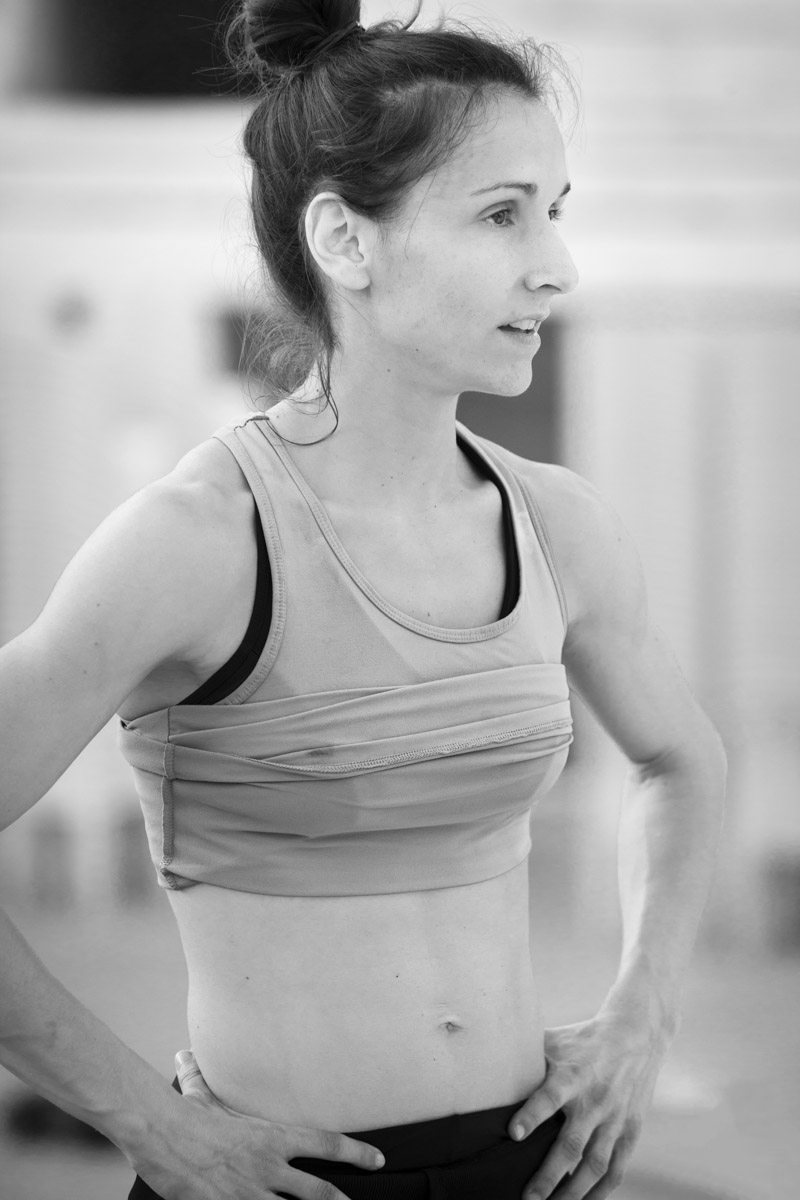

Personal information
- Full name: Violeta Giménez Niñoles
- Born: 12 September 1978 (age 47) Alicante, Spain

Gymnastics career
- Discipline: Rhythmic Gymnastics / Acrobatic Gymnastics
- Country represented: Spain; (1994)
- Club: E.D.M. San Juan de Alicante; Club CEU Jesús María de Alicante; Club Atlético Montemar
- Head coach: Emilia Boneva
- Assistant coach: María Fernández Ostolaza
Medal record
Rhythmic Gymnastics
Representing Spain
World Championships
Silver medal – second place	1994 Paris	Group All-around
Bronze medal – third place	1994 Paris	6 ropes
Bronze medal – third place	1994 Paris	4 hoops/2 clubs

Violeta Giménez Niñoles (born 12 September 1978) is a retired Spanish rhythmic and acrobatic gymnast. In rhythmic gymnastics she's a three times World medalist.

== Biography ==
She started rhythmic gymnastics at the age of 5 in the municipal sports schools of San Juan de Alicante. At the age of 7 she moved to the CEU Jesús María Club and, in 1993, to the Club Atlético Montemar. In 1992 she was sixth in the Spanish Group Championships in the junior category with the 6 hoops exercise. In 1993, already at Montemar, she was fifth in the individual junior category in the Spanish Individual "B" Championships, and in December of that year she won All-Around silver and two gold medals in the apparatus finals in the 1st category of the Spanish Group Championships. The group was made up of Violeta, Marta Baldó, Noelia Fernández (captain), Estela Giménez, Peligros Piñero, Jéssica Salido and Montserrat Soria, some of whom will become members of the national team.

In 1994 she was chosen by coach Emilia Boneva along with her friend Estela Giménez to enter the Spanish national team as part of the senior group, in which she remained all year. During this time she lived with the rest of the team members in a house in Canillejas and trained at the Moscardó Gym for an average of 8 hours a day under the orders of Boneva herself and María Fernández Ostolaza.

For 1994, the two exercises of the ensemble were the 6 ropes one, where the music used by the group was the soundtrack of The Addams Family composed by Marc Shaiman, and the 4 hoop and 4 clubs, where they used the theme "Spanish Fury". In October 1994, although as a substitute gymnast in both exercises, she participated for the first time in an international competition: the World Championships in Paris, achieving the silver medal in the All-Around and two bronze medals in the apparatus finals. On the first two days of competition, the Spanish group obtained a total score of 38.700, about 225 thousandths less than the Russians, after having achieved a score of 19.350 in each of the two exercises. In the two apparatus finals on the last day, Spain achieved two third places, being surpassed by Russia and Bulgaria. In the 6 ropes final they scored 19.400 and in the 4 hoops and 4 clubs final 19.325. The group was made up of Marta Baldó, Lorena Barbadillo, Paula Cabo, Estela Giménez, Regina Guati and Amaia Uriondo, with María Pardo and Violeta as the substitutes. Furthermore, although they were not called up that year, Maider Esparza and Lucía Fernández Haro were in the team. At the end of the season, most of them retired.

After leaving the national team, Violeta temporarily retired after becoming Spanish champion in December 1994 in Gijón with the first category team of Club Atlético Montemar made up of Violeta, Noelia Fernández, Verónica Lillo, Jéssica Salido, Patricia Simón and Marina Zaragoza. In 1995 she returned to training and in December 1996 she competed for the last time, becoming Spanish champion with the Montemar senior team.

She retired from rhythmic gymnastics permanently in December 1996. She later began practicing acrobatic gymnastics, a discipline she learned about while studying a degree in physical education in Valencia. In 2004 and 2005 she was Spanish champion in mixed pairs, and she competed in some international friendly interclub tournaments. She also created, together with several people, the free time association "Vivevaleke", where she began to hold shows, parades and workshops. In 2006 she was the founder of the Dinamic Acrobatic Gymnastics Club of Mislata, although since September 2010 they have been based in Manises. Since its foundation, she has been the director of the club, and is also the coordinator of the competition coaching team. The club has obtained good results and numerous victories in national championships, with some of its gymnasts participating in European and World Championships, and achieving bronze in the men's pair in a World Cup. Furthermore, Dinamic is also dedicated to producing shows and events of various kinds, some of which include Violeta as a member. In January 2012, Dinamic won the fourteenth edition of the Telecinco program Tú si que vales with a group acrobatic show in which she herself participated. As a result of this achievement, the club received a prize of 30,000 euros and a contract to work on The Hole show in Madrid during February of that year. Since 2014, as part of the Cirque des Sens company, Dinamic has developed the Aihua show, touring throughout Spain with it.

For 2016, Violeta was also a member of the Acrobatic Gymnastics Technical Commission of the Royal Spanish Gymnastics Federation.
