= Economy of Erie, Pennsylvania =

Erie, Pennsylvania is the Commonwealth's primary access point to Lake Erie, the Great Lakes, and the Saint Lawrence Seaway. The city developed first as a maritime center after the American Revolution, as a railroad hub during the great American westward expansion, and as an important manufacturing center during the Industrial Revolution. By the 21st century, electric locomotive building is all that remains of big industry, but smaller-scale steel and plastics manufacturers, as well as health care, insurance, tourism and recreation have emerged as Erie's new diverse mix of key industries.

== Employment ==
=== Unemployment statistics ===
As of February 2021, Erie's unemployment rate was 9.9%. This compares to a 7.3% unemployment rate for Pennsylvania and 6.2% for the country as a whole.

=== Top industries and employers ===
As of June 2005, Erie's top-ten employers by size of work force are the government (6,435 persons, or 30%), manufacturers (5,200 persons, or 24%), medical services (4,774 persons, or 22%), and other (insurance, retail, and public utilities) (4,950 persons, or 23%). This diversity is less apparent among firms with fewer employees, however. For example, manufacturing is a significant 39% of the local economy among firms with 200 to 500 employees (18 of 46 firms).

Erie is no longer the corporate headquarters of GE Transportation, which was spun off from GE and merged with Wabtec, headquartered in Pittsburgh. However, Wabtec has maintained operations at the Erie locomotive plant, moving manufacturing from the former MotivePower plant in Boise, Idaho to Erie. It is also home to others such as Plastek Industries and Erie Insurance. The Plastek Group is a major manufacturer of plastic packaging materials for consumer goods, cosmetics and pharmaceuticals, as well as connectors for cars, circuit cards, card holders, and other plastic products. Erie Insurance Group handles a wide range of insurance products, including life, health, automobile, and homeowners.

=== Manufacturing and technology industries ===
Heavy industry is on the decline in Erie. However, smaller, high-precision companies are growing in size and scope. For example, Lord Corporation, which specializes in shock- and vibration-damping products for the aerospace industry, was founded in and has major operations in Erie.

The plastics industry is vital to Erie's economy. Over 10% of the nation's plastics are manufactured or finished in Erie-based plastics plants. These plants are supported by many locally owned CNC machine tool job shops.

Erie is an emerging center for biofuels and environmental research. Erie Biofuels, located on the former Hammermill Paper plant, which began producing biodiesel in the fall of 2007, with an expected production volume of 45 million US gallons (170,000 m^{3}) of biofuel per year.

The Erie Plating Company is also headquartered in Erie.

=== Tourism and entertainment industries ===
Tourism plays an increasingly important role in the local economy as the number of visitors continues to rise. The millions who visit Presque Isle State Park also frequent downtown Erie and regional attractions.

In February 2007, the Presque Isle Downs racino opened for business in Summit Township, creating more jobs and drawing even more tourists into the area.

== Economic development ==
The following municipal, county, and state programs are vital aspects of the economic development of the Erie community.

=== Erie County development assistance ===
The Economic Development Corporation of Erie County, Inc (EDCEC), based in Erie, is the city's lead development coordinator. It routinely works with the Erie County General Authority (ECGA), the Erie County Community Services Financing Authority (ECCSFA), the Erie Industrial Development Corporation (EIDCO), the Erie County Industrial Development Authority (ECIDA), the Enterprise Development Fund of Erie County, and the Greater Erie Industrial Development Corporation (GEIDC). EDCEC assists with state financing and incentive programs.

=== Local Economic Revitalization Tax Act (LERTA) ===
Mayor Rick Fillipi established an aggressive citywide real estate tax abatement program in November 2002, overhauling a more modest tax abatement program dating back to the 1970s that only applied to low- and moderate-income neighborhoods. The Local Economic Revitalization Tax Act (LERTA) plan allows a 100% ten-year tax exemption for the costs of new construction or improvements to property. The program in its current form expires on 13 November 2007. The City Council, the Erie School Board, and the Erie County Council must approve any new program.

=== Keystone Innovation Zone (Erie KIZ) ===
The Technology Council of Northwest Pennsylvania (TCNWP) is the regional coordinator of Erie KIZ (see program details), one of a number of programs of the Pennsylvania Department of Community and Economic Development (DCED) (see DCED Program Finder). KIZ aims to bring businesses and universities together to promote technological innovations and therefore regional economic development at the nexus of education and commerce.

=== Keystone Opportunity Zone (KOZ) ===
State and local tax relief is provided to qualified Erie businesses, residents, and property owners to encourage them to develop designated Keystone Opportunity Zones. Erie falls under the jurisdiction of the Northwest Regional Planning and Development Commission (see map) for coordination of KOZ matters with the commonwealth.

=== Neighborhood Revitalization Strategy Area (NRSA) ===
The city's Department of Economic and Community Development (DECD), in cooperation with selected urban neighborhood stakeholders, submitted a five-year plan to the US Department of Housing and Urban Development (HUD) in February 2006, which prioritizes and coordinates a range of existing neighborhood development efforts. The NRSA plan targets improvements to the center city neighborhoods known as the SNOOPS Neighborhood Watch, the Central City Neighborhood Alliance Neighborhood Watch, the Center City East neighborhood, the Little Italy neighborhood, and a section of the Downtown Improvement District (DID). HUD approval allows the city access to federal funds through the Community Development Block Grant (CDBG) program. see details in the NRSA plan
