= Erie Plating Company =

Specializes in applied electrochemical and mechanical metal finishing

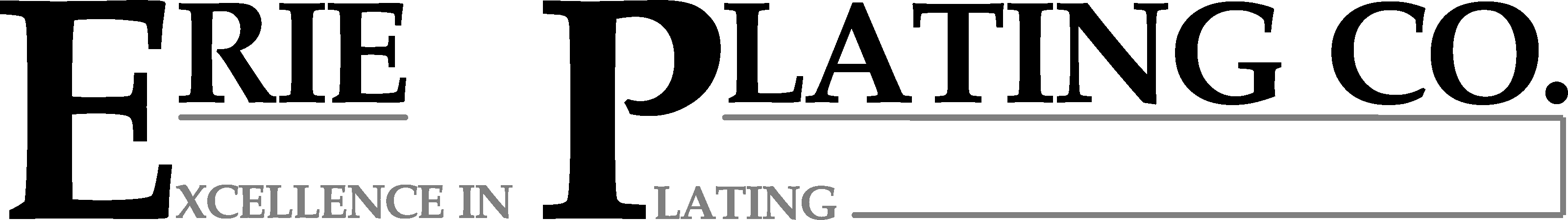
- Type: Private
- Industry: Manufacturing
- Founded: Erie, Pennsylvania, U.S. (1925)
- Founder: Raymond E. Smith
- Headquarters: Erie, Pennsylvania, U.S.
- Number of locations: 1 plant (2008)
- Area served: North America
- Key people: David T. Briggs, President
- Services: Plating; Electroplating; Chromate conversion Anodizing; Metal polishing
- Number of employees: 125 (2008)
- Website: erieplating.com

Erie Plating Company, named for its location in Erie, Pennsylvania, specializes in applied electrochemical and mechanical metal finishing to ferrous and nonferrous metals, as well as chromate conversion and anodizing finishes on aluminum. The company is ISO 9000 certified for aerospace, military, and industrial metal finishing engineering and quality systems.

== History ==
In 1925, Raymond E. Smith, a former metal polisher and the superintendent of the Lakeside Forge Company, was asked by their group of investors to join in starting a metal finishing company that could perform finishing and electroplating for third-party clients. Along with a financier, a technician, and a salesman, he formed the Erie Plating Company, the first electroplating company in northwest Pennsylvania. Erie Plating Company now serves customers through the Eastern United States.

At the time of the company's founding the electroplating industry was in its infancy. At that time, the company's main focus was in finishing cast-iron cookware, polishing the chrome on wood-burning stoves, and plating metals used in other products like locomotives, automobiles, and iceboxes.

In 1932, Lewis T. Briggs Sr., a part-owner of the Erie Bronze Company, bought out Smith's co-investors and became president of the eight-person company.

During World War II the Erie Plating Company expanded into plating military components. The main wartime products produced in Erie were bomb fuses, aircraft parts, and communication equipment.

=== Landmark 1961 Pennsylvania Sales and Use Tax Case ===
In March 1957, an accountant from the Pennsylvania Sales and Use Tax Bureau performed an audit of Erie Plating Company, and retroactively assessed use taxes on Erie Plating Company's purchases of supplies. This assessment violated the precedent that, as a manufacturing company, Erie Plating Company was exempt from the tax, and results in double-taxation. That is, the electroplating processes applied to the component parts were taxed, and then the same processes were re-taxed in the sale of the final product. In July, Erie Plating Company filed a petition for reassessment, a hearing was held in January of the following year, and three months later the Bureau reaffirmed its assessments.

Erie Plating Company again appealed for reassessment, and the issue came to a head on December 17, 1958, during the second hearing on the issue. Addressing the court, Lewis T. Briggs Sr. said:

Such interpretation [of the Sales and Use Tax Law] is unfair to Pennsylvania industry... because we are competing with electroplaters in Ohio and New York where no such tax is imposed.

The business of industrial metal finishing in which we are engaged is a highly competitive manufacturing enterprise. The latest published national average of profit for the industry is less than 2% of the sales dollar before federal taxes and we must therefore depend on a large volume with economical operation to keep out of the red. The imposition of a use tax on our purchase of supplies and equipment would certainly result in an overall net loss.

Two weeks later, the Pennsylvania Board of Finance and Revenue rescinded the assessments in total. However, in March 1959, the Pennsylvania Department of Revenue issued a lawsuit against Erie Plating Company. This was the first instance in the 30-year history of the Pennsylvania Board of Finance and Revenue in which any state department had countermanded its decision.

Trial began October 10, 1960, and on February 14, 1961, the court presented its decision that the Pennsylvania Board of Finance and Revenue was in error, thereby declaring that electroplating is not, in fact, manufacturing, and that therefore electroplaters are not exempt from sales and use taxes.

In response, Erie Plating Company issued the following statement:

In view of the adverse court decision metal finishers throughout the state are now liable for Use Tax dating back to September 1, 1953 plus a 25% penalty plus interest at 6%.

What this means to the metal finishing industry in Pennsylvania is tragic to contemplate. It seems inevitable that some operators will be put out of business --- many, even among the strongest, will be forced to do major refinancing, and not a few are considering moving out of state.

Notwithstanding, Erie Plating Company survived the discriminatory ruling, and chose to retain operation in the state of Pennsylvania.

=== 1963 Erie Urban Renewal Act ===
In 1963, Erie Plating Company was one of the first companies to embrace the Erie Urban Renewal Act and participate in the Liberty-Sassafras Redevelopment Program, enhancing community business development in the City of Erie Pennsylvania.

=== 1972 – Fighting against cadmium price-fixing ===
In 1972, Lewis T. Briggs Jr., as a member of the North American Metal Finishing Society's Strategic and Critical Materials Committee, placed formal accusations with the United States Tariff Commission against the major American cadmium producers as represented by the Lead Zinc Producers Committee. The accusation was that:

No other metal has been so completely controlled by a group of U.S. producers for their own selfish interests [as cadmium has been]. And we find it hard not to suspect that illegal price rigging and manipulative practices are taking place again.

Efforts by the Cadmium Lobby to prevent the importation of cadmium from Japan under the guise of 'dumping' is not only unfair, but constitutes a very obvious sham. Their purpose is most transparent --- by limiting the importation of this critical and strategic material, U.S. cadmium producers would have an even freer rein to control the sale and distribution of this metal.

The North American Metal Finishing Society, under the advice of Lewis T. Briggs Jr., urged the United States Tariff Commission to encourage the importation of foreign cadmium to help stabilize the market.

=== 2000: Erie Plating Company's 75th Anniversary ===
In September 2000, Erie Plating Company was recognized for 75 years of business in the city of Erie, in a ceremony conducted by Erie Mayor Joyce Savocchio, Erie County Executive Judy Lynch, and Pennsylvania State Governor Tom Ridge.

=== Today ===
In 2008, Erie Plating Company employs about 125 employees at its 100,000 square feet (9,300 m^{2}) central plant, which ranks among the top 40% of the cleanest industrial facilities in the United States according to Scorecard's Environmental Release Survey.

Recent products include the chrome plating on AMSCO operating table handles, gas pump handles at service stations, auto parts, and components of measuring tools and computers.

== 1996 Summer Olympics ==
For the 1996 Summer Olympics, Erie Plating Company provided metal finishing services for the 10,000+ Olympic torches manufactured by the American Meter Company, also headquartered in Erie, Pennsylvania. Each torch weighed about 3.5 pounds (1.6 kg) and was made primarily of aluminum, with a Georgia pecan wood handle and gold ornamentation.

== Awards ==
- In 1995, Erie Plating Company was titled "Manufacturing Business of the Year" by Gannon University.
- Erie Plating Company received the City of Erie Pennsylvania's Environmental Award for Waste Treatment in 1999, and an additional 12-month continuous compliance award in 2000.

== Leadership ==
Start	End	President
1925	1932	Raymond E. Smith
1932	1967	Lewis T. Briggs Sr.
1967	1991	Lewis T. Briggs Jr.
1991	2025	David T. Briggs
2025	N/A	Kevin Smith

== Publications ==
- "Is Electroplating manufacturing? / The Erie Plating Story", self-published 1961
- Article on neoprene control stations for the 1970 edition of the McGraw-Hill book "Modern Manufacturing"
- "Computerizing lab control records & activities", by Tom Luteran, Journal of Plating and Surface Finishing, 2000, Volume 87, No. 11, pp. 15–16
