= Lorena Guréndez =

Spanish rhythmic gymnast

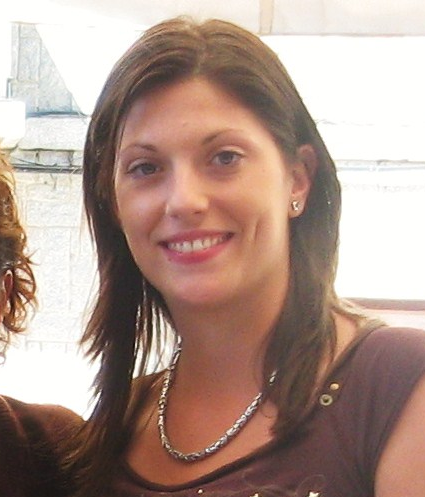

Personal information
- Born: 7 May 1981 (age 45) Vitoria, Spain

Sport
- Sport: Rhythmic gymnastics
Medal record
Women's rhythmic gymnastics
Representing Spain
Olympic Games
| Gold medal – first place | 1996 Atlanta | Group All-around |

Lorena Guréndez García (born 7 May 1981 in Vitoria) is a Spanish rhythmic gymnast and Olympic Champion. She competed at the 1996 Summer Olympics in Atlanta, and won a gold medal with the Spanish group. The team was formed by Lorena, Estela Giménez, Marta Baldó, Nuria Cabanillas, Estíbaliz Martínez and Tania Lamarca. Also, she was twice world champion: one in 3 balls/2 ribbons and other in 3 ribbons/2 hoops.

In 1995, she was the Spanish junior champion, individually and in teams with the Oskitxo Club. In 1996, she became part of the Spanish national rhythmic gymnastics team in the ensemble modality. Since then, all medals obtained in official competitions were obtained as a member of the Spanish ensemble. In 1996, she won her first world title in the final of three balls and two ribbons at the World Championship in Budapest, where she also won silver in the general competition.

1997, she was runner-up in Europe in 5 balls and bronze in 3 balls and 2 ribbons in the European Championship in Patras. In 1998, she won her second world title at the World Championship in Seville, this time in 3 ribbons and 2 rings, as well as winning silver in the general competition. In the European Championship of Budapest held in 1999 he was bronze medal in the competition of 3 ribbons and 2 rings. 2000, she participated in her second Olympic Games, finishing in tenth position in the team competition in Sydney 2000.

In 2013, the documentary Las Niñas de Oro (The Golden Girls) premiered on YouTube. It tells the story of the Olympic champion team in Atlanta through interviews with the gymnasts themselves, and in 2016, she attended the 20th Anniversary Gala of the Gold Medal in Atlanta '96 in Badajoz with the rest of the team.

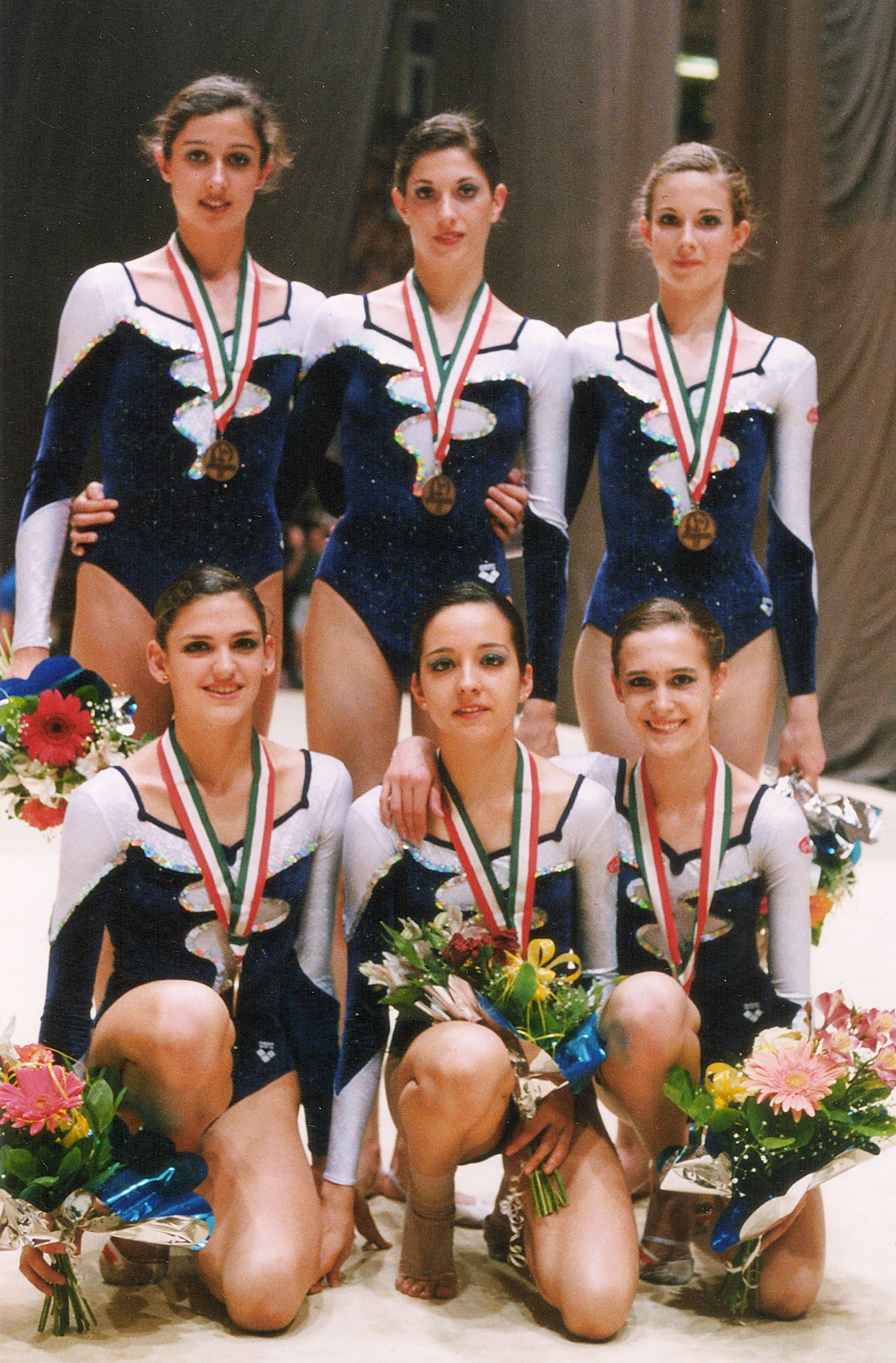
Spanish Ensemble 1999 Budapest 04

She has received several awards, including the Olympic Order from the Spanish Olympic Committee (1996), the Gold Plaque of the Royal Order of Sports Merit (1996), the Baron de Güell Cup at the National Sports Awards (1997), and the Gold Medal of the Royal Order of Sports Merit (2015). She is married to the artistic gymnast José Luis Fernández.

Lorena is the youngest Spanish athlete to win an Olympic medal, doing so at the age of 15 years and 87 days.

== See also ==
- List of gymnasts
- List of Olympic medalists in gymnastics (women)
- Gymnastics at the Pan American Games
- World Rhythmic Gymnastics Championships
- Gymnastics at the World Games
- Rhythmic Gymnastics European Championships
