= 1996 Summer Olympics =

Multi-sport event in Atlanta, Georgia, US

Games of the XXVI Olympiad
- Emblem of the 1996 Summer Olympics
- Location: Atlanta, United States
- Motto: The Celebration of the Century
- Nations: 197
- Athletes: 10,318 (6,806 men, 3,512 women)
- Events: 271 in 26 sports (37 disciplines)
- Opening: July 19, 1996
- Closing: August 4, 1996
- Opened by: President Bill Clinton
- Closed by: IOC president Juan Antonio Samaranch
- Cauldron: Muhammad Ali
- Stadium: Centennial Olympic Stadium

The 1996 Summer Olympics (officially the Games of the XXVI Olympiad, also known as Atlanta 1996 and commonly referred to as the Centennial Olympic Games) were an international multi-sport event held from July 19 to August 4, 1996, in Atlanta, Georgia, United States. These were the fourth Summer Olympics to be hosted by the United States, making it the first country to have three different cities host the Summer Olympics. It also marked the 100th anniversary of the 1896 Summer Olympics in Athens, the inaugural edition of the modern Olympic Games. These were also the first Summer Olympics to be held in a different year than the Winter Olympics since the Winter Olympics commenced in 1924, as part of a new IOC practice implemented in 1994 to hold the Summer and Winter Games in alternating, even-numbered years. The 1996 Games were the first of the two consecutive Summer Olympics to be held in a predominantly English-speaking country, preceding the 2000 Summer Olympics in Sydney, Australia. These were also the last Summer Olympics to be held in North America until 2028, when Los Angeles will host the games for the third time.

10,318 athletes from 197 National Olympic Committees competed in 26 sports, including the Olympic debuts of beach volleyball, mountain biking and softball, as well as the new disciplines of lightweight rowing, women's swimming 4 x 200 freestyle relay, women's fencing, team rhythmic gymnastics, and women's association football. A total of 24 countries made their Summer Olympic debuts in Atlanta, including 11 former Soviet republics participating for the first time as independent nations. With a total of 101 medals, the United States topped both the gold and overall medal count for the first time since 1984 (and for the first time since 1968 in a non-boycotted Summer Olympics), also winning the most gold (44) and silver (32) medals out of all the participating nations. Notable performances during the competition included those of Andre Agassi, whose gold medal in these Games would be followed up with the French Open title in 1999, making him the first men's singles tennis player to complete the Career Golden Slam; Donovan Bailey, who set a new world record of 9.84 for the men's 100 meters; Lilia Podkopayeva, who became the second gymnast to win an individual event gold medal after winning the all-around title in the same Olympics; and the Magnificent Seven, who dramatically won the first ever U.S. gold medal in the women's artistic gymnastics team all-around.

The Games were marred by violence on July 27, 1996, when a pipe bomb was detonated at Centennial Olympic Park (which had been built to serve as a public focal point for the festivities), killing two and injuring 111. Years later, Eric Rudolph confessed to the bombing and a series of related terrorist attacks, and was sentenced to life in prison. Nonetheless, the 1996 Olympics turned a profit, helped by record revenue from sponsorship deals and broadcast rights, and a reliance on private funding, among other factors. There were 8.3 million tickets sold for events at this Olympics, a record broken only in 2024. There was some criticism of the perceived over-commercialization of the Games, with other issues raised by European officials, such as the availability of food and transport. The event had a lasting impact on the city; Centennial Olympic Park led a revitalization of Atlanta's downtown area, and has served as a symbol of the legacy of the 1996 Games; the Olympic Village buildings have since been used as residential housing for area universities; and Centennial Olympic Stadium has since been redeveloped twice, first as the Turner Field baseball stadium, then as the Center Parc American football stadium.

== Bidding process ==
Atlanta was selected on September 18, 1990, in Tokyo, Japan, over Athens, Belgrade, Manchester, Melbourne, and Toronto at the 96th IOC Session. The city entered the competition as a dark horse, being up against stiff competition. The US media also criticized Atlanta as a second-tier city and complained of Georgia's Confederate history. However, the IOC Evaluation Commission ranked Atlanta's infrastructure and facilities the highest, while IOC members said that it could guarantee large television revenues similar to the success of the 1984 Summer Olympics in Los Angeles, the most recent Olympics in the United States. Additionally, former US ambassador to the UN and Atlanta mayor Andrew Young touted Atlanta's civil rights history and reputation for racial harmony. Young also wanted to showcase a reformed American South. The strong economy of Atlanta and improved race relations in the South helped to impress the IOC officials. Coca-Cola, a long-standing partner of the Olympics, was also a strong advocate to bring the Games to its hometown. The Atlanta Committee for the Olympic Games (ACOG) also proposed a substantial revenue-sharing with the IOC, USOC, and other NOCs.

Atlanta's main rivals were Toronto, whose front-running bid that began in 1986 had chances to succeed after Canada had held a successful 1988 Winter Olympics in Calgary, and Melbourne, Australia, who hosted the 1956 Summer Olympics and after Brisbane, Australia's failed bid for the 1992 games (which were awarded to Barcelona) and prior to Sydney, Australia's successful 2000 Summer Olympics bid. This would be Toronto's fourth failed attempt since 1960 (tried in 1960, 1964, and 1976, but was defeated by Rome, Tokyo and Montreal).

Greece, the home of the ancient and first modern Olympics, was considered by many observers the "natural choice" for the Centennial Games, due to its "divine right" in history. Athens bid chairman Spyros Metaxas gave repeated warnings to the IOC and demanded to give them the games to mark the centennial, saying "You don't hold a 100th birthday in someone else's home. The Centenary Games should be held in Athens." He also warned that "if we don't get the Olympics in 1996 we will never bid again to host them." However, the Athens bid was described as "arrogant and poorly prepared," being regarded as "not being up to the task of coping with the modern and risk-prone extravaganza" of the current Games. Athens faced numerous obstacles, including "political instability, potential security problems, air pollution, traffic congestion and the fact that it would have to spend about US$3 billion to improve its infrastructure of airports, roads, rail lines and other amenities." Athens would later be selected to host the 2004 Summer Olympics seven years later on September 5, 1997.

1996 Summer Olympics bidding results
City	Country	Round				
City	Country	1	2	3	4	5
Atlanta	United States	19	20	26	34	51
Athens	Greece	23	23	26	30	35
Toronto	Canada	14	17	18	22	—
Melbourne	Australia	12	21	16	—	—
Manchester	Great Britain	11	5	—	—	—
Belgrade	Yugoslavia (Note: The Socialist Federal Republic of Yugoslavia was still in existence at the time of bidding for the 1996 Olympics, although it would cease to exist in 1992, by the time of the 1996 Summer Olympic games.)	7	—	—	—	—

== Development and preparation ==
=== Budget ===
The total cost of the 1996 Summer Olympics was estimated to be around US$1.7 billion. The venues and the Games themselves were funded entirely via private investment, and the only public funding came from the U.S. government for security, and around $500 million of public money used on physical public infrastructure including streetscaping, road improvements, Centennial Olympic Park (alongside $75 million in private funding), expansion of the airport, improvements in public transportation, and redevelopment of public housing projects. $420 million worth of tickets were sold, sale of sponsorship rights accounted for $540 million, and sale of the domestic broadcast rights to NBC accounted for $456 million. In total, the Games turned a profit of $19 million.

The cost for Atlanta 1996 compares with costs of $4.6 billion for Rio 2016, $40–44 billion for Beijing 2008, and $51 billion for Sochi 2014 Winter Olympics (the most expensive Olympic Games without differentiating between summer and winter in history). The average cost for the Summer Games since 1960 is $5.2 billion.

=== Security ===
ACOG budgeted $32.7 million for Atlanta Police Department and Georgia Department of Public Safety services during the games. $70 million in funding came from the U.S. federal government for additional services, including 500 additional federal agents.

=== Transportation ===
Transportation relied heavily on an expanded MARTA rail and 3,000 additional buses borrowed from nationwide transit agencies. Ticketed events came with free public transportation. Shuttles were provided for VIPs, athletes and olympic officials. These shuttles connected remote Park 'N Ride lots, central terminals, and specific competition venues. The city implemented new High-Occupancy Vehicle lanes on I-75 and I-85 highways and coordinated traffic from a centralized Traffic Management Center to handle the daily crowds that often exceeded 500,000 people.

The games were challenged by driver shortages, route navigation errors, and logistical delays.

=== Venues and infrastructure ===
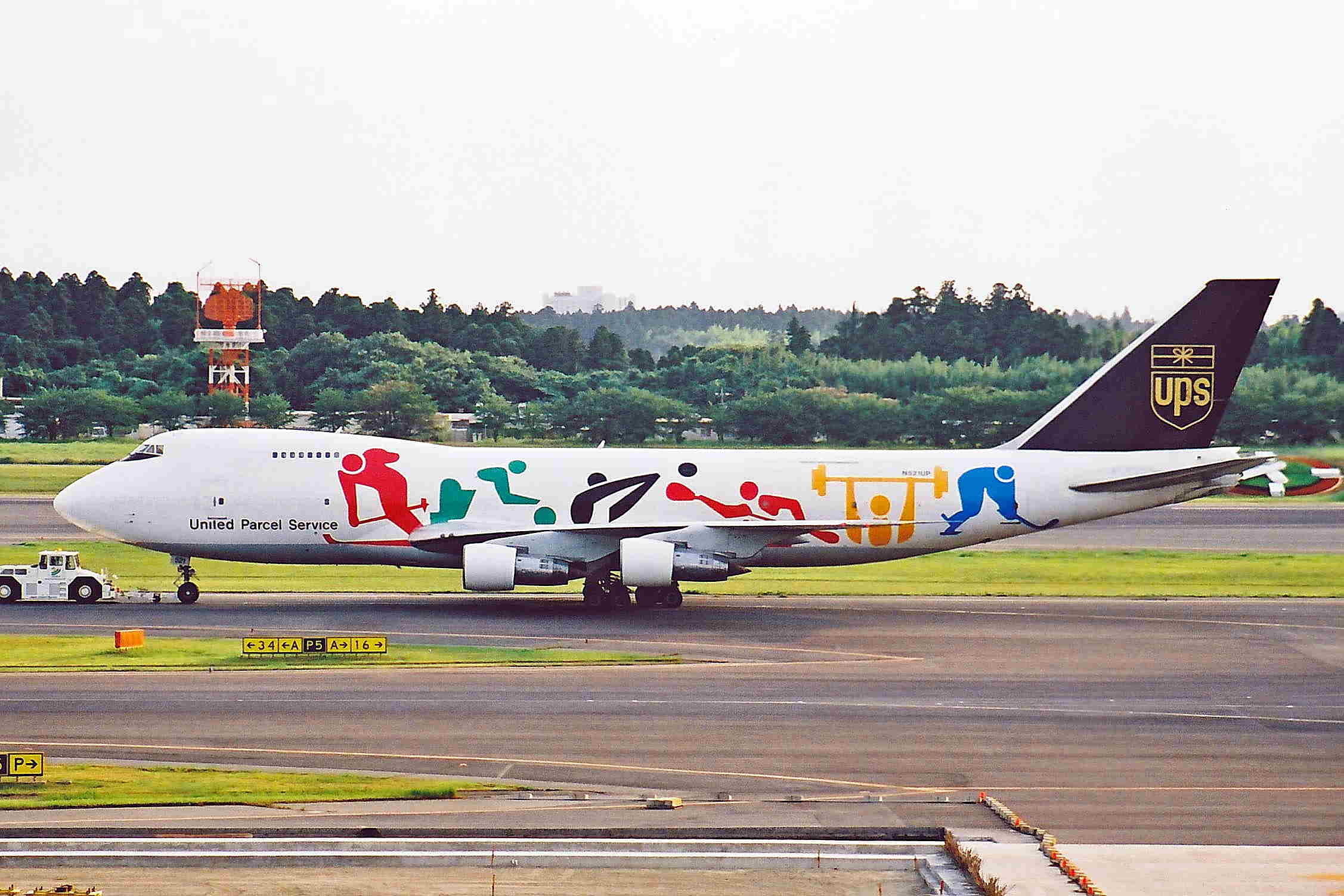
A Boeing 747-200 from UPS Airlines in the 1996 Summer Olympics paint

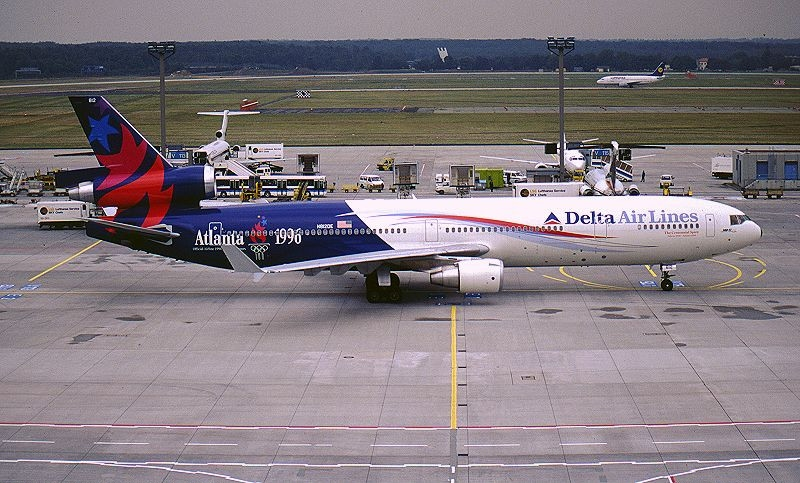
A McDonnell Douglas MD-11 from Delta Air Lines in the 1996 Summer Olympics paint

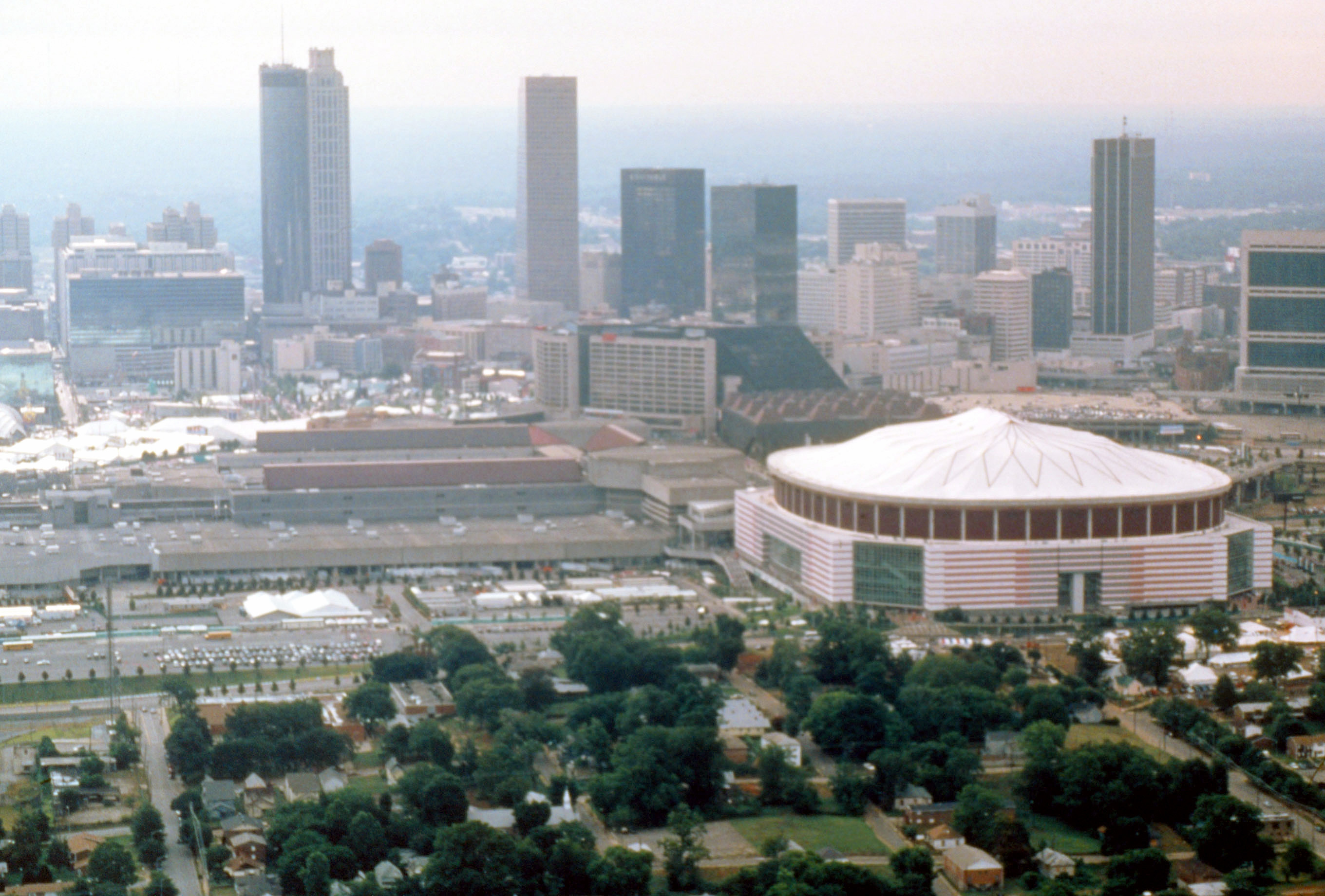
Georgia Dome

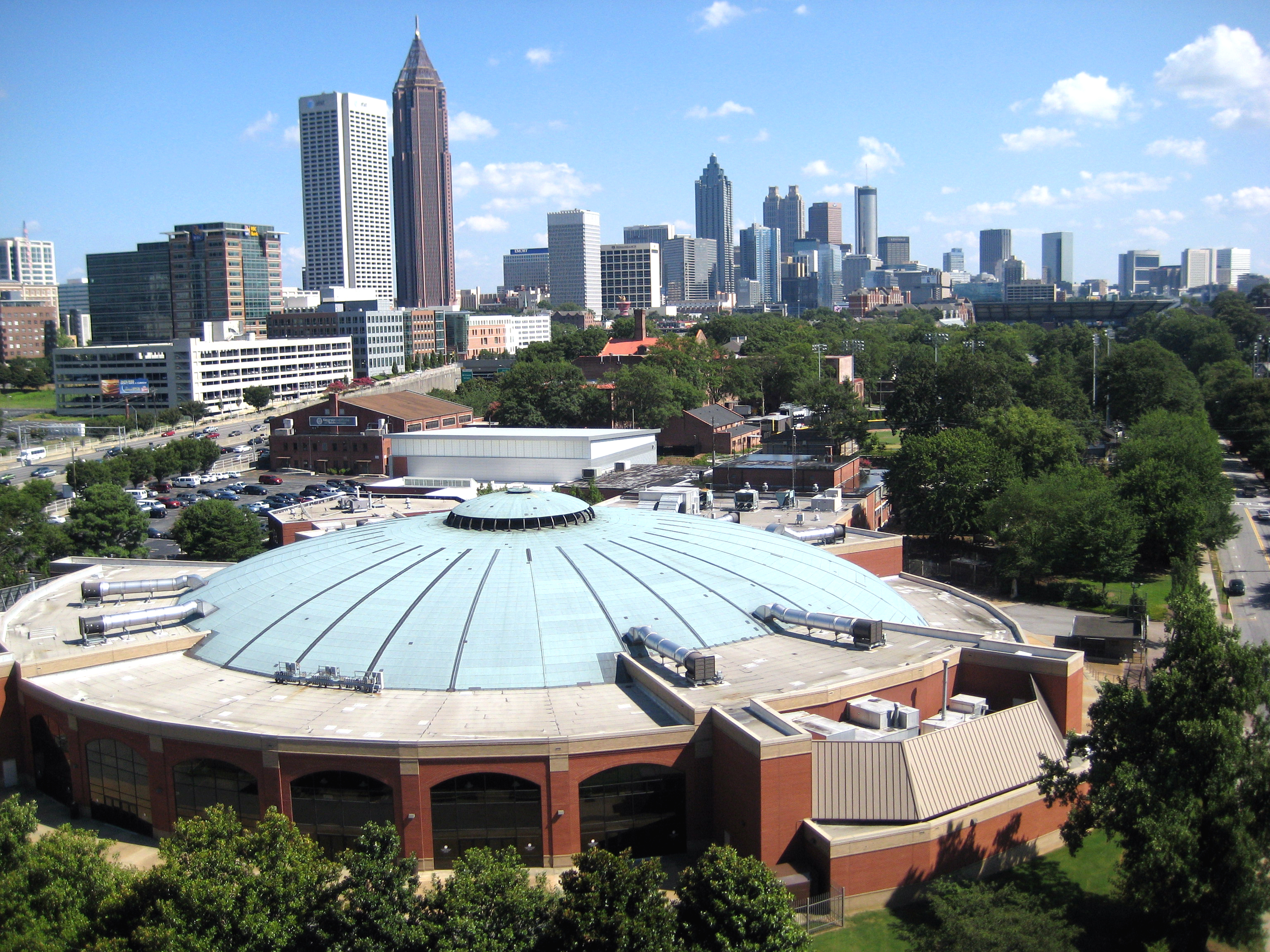
Alexander Memorial Coliseum

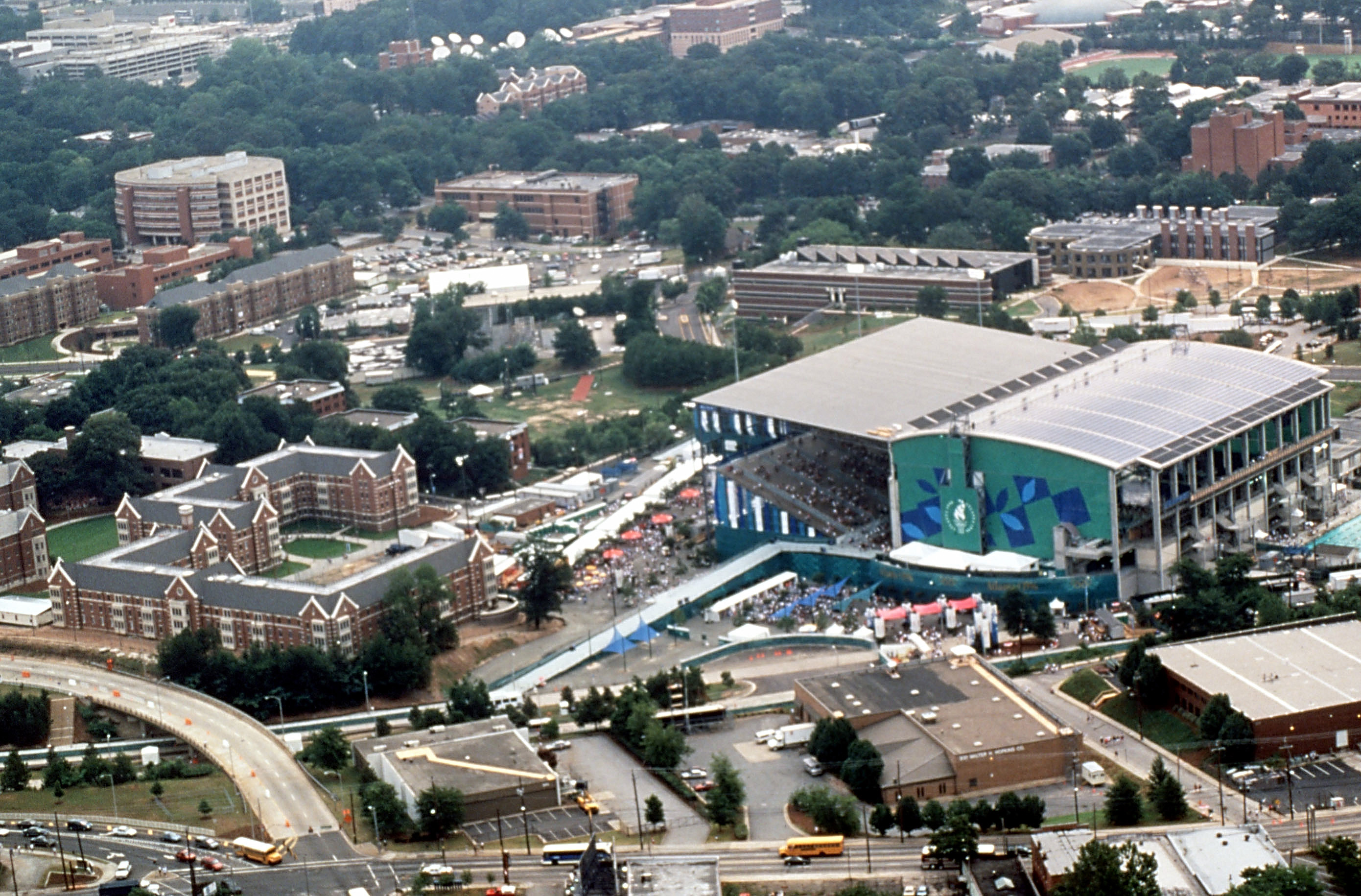
Georgia Tech Aquatic Center

Events of the 1996 Games were held in a completely decentralized way using mostly existing facilities that were not built for the Games. Most of the events were held in the so-called Olympic Ring, a 3 mi (4.8 km) circle from the center of Atlanta. Others were held at Stone Mountain, about 20 miles (32 km) outside of the city. In many cases, it was decided to remove events from the Atlanta Metropolitan Region to save money, while in others the calendar was a difficulty, as was the case with association football (soccer) which ended up having its host cities spread across the Southeastern United States region.

During early planning stages in 1992, Payne and the ACOG wanted a golf event to be held at Augusta National Golf Club. Initially, Augusta agreed, but protests from civil rights leaders and politicians against the club's strict admission policies led to the collapse of the idea.

==== Venues in the city of Atlanta ====
- Alexander Memorial Coliseum – Boxing
- Atlanta–Fulton County Stadium – Baseball
- Centennial Olympic Stadium – Opening/Closing Ceremonies, Athletics
- Forbes Arena – Basketball
- Georgia Dome – Basketball (final), Gymnastics (artistic), Handball (men's final)
- Georgia State University Sports Arena – Badminton
- Georgia Tech Aquatic Center – Diving, Modern pentathlon (swimming), Swimming, Synchronized Swimming, Water Polo
- Georgia World Congress Center – Fencing, Handball, Judo, Modern pentathlon (fencing, shooting), Table Tennis, Weightlifting, Wrestling
- Herndon Stadium – Field hockey (final)
- Omni Coliseum – Volleyball (indoor final)
- Panther Stadium – Field hockey
- Wolf Creek Shooting Complex – Shooting

==== Venues in Georgia ====
- Clayton County International Park (Jonesboro, Georgia) – Beach Volleyball
- Georgia International Horse Park (Conyers, Georgia) – Cycling (mountain), Equestrian, Modern pentathlon (riding, running)
- Golden Park (Columbus, Georgia) – Softball
- Stone Mountain Tennis Center (Stone Mountain, Georgia) – Tennis
- Stone Mountain Park Archery Center (Stone Mountain, Georgia) – Archery
- Stone Mountain Park Velodrome (Stone Mountain, Georgia) – Cycling (track)
- Sanford Stadium (Athens, Georgia) at the University of Georgia – Football (final)
- Stegeman Coliseum (Athens, Georgia) at the University of Georgia – Gymnastics (rhythmic), Volleyball (indoor)
- Wassaw Sound (Savannah, Georgia) – Sailing
- Lake Lanier (Gainesville, Georgia) – Canoeing (sprint), Rowing

==== Other venues ====
- Ocoee Whitewater Center (Polk County, Tennessee) – Canoeing (slalom)
- RFK Stadium (Washington, D.C.) – Football
- Legion Field (Birmingham, Alabama) – Football
- Miami Orange Bowl (Miami, Florida) – Football

=== Olympic Arts Festival ===
The Olympic Arts Festival offered 200 ticketed events, including more than 20 exhibitions in local institutions, museums, and gallery spaces. ACOG budgeted $24 million. More than 3,000 artists participated during the two weeks of the Games. There were numerous free events including a daily series of music at Centennial Olympic Park, called "Southern Crossroads".

In 1994, African-American artist Kevin Cole was commissioned to create the Coca-Cola Centennial Olympic Wall, and the 15-story mural took two years to complete.

=== Olympic Music ===
The Olympiad's official theme, "Summon the Heroes", was written by John Williams, making it the third Olympiad at that point for which he had composed (official composer in 1984, NBC's coverage composer in 1988). The opening ceremony featured Céline Dion singing "The Power of the Dream", the theme song of the 1996 Olympics. The closing ceremony featured Gloria Estefan singing "Reach", the official theme song of the 1996 Olympics.

=== Torch relay ===
The torch relay was run from April 27 to July 19, leading up to the Games in Atlanta. The route covered 26,875 kilometers (16,699 mi) across the United States. The relay involved over 12,000 torchbearers, including Muhammad Ali, who was chosen to ignite the flame at the opening ceremony.

=== Tickets ===
8.32 million tickets were sold, a record recently broken by Paris 2024. Ticket sales brought in $420 million for the ACOG, 1/4 of its operating budget.

== Marketing ==
=== Emblem and branding ===
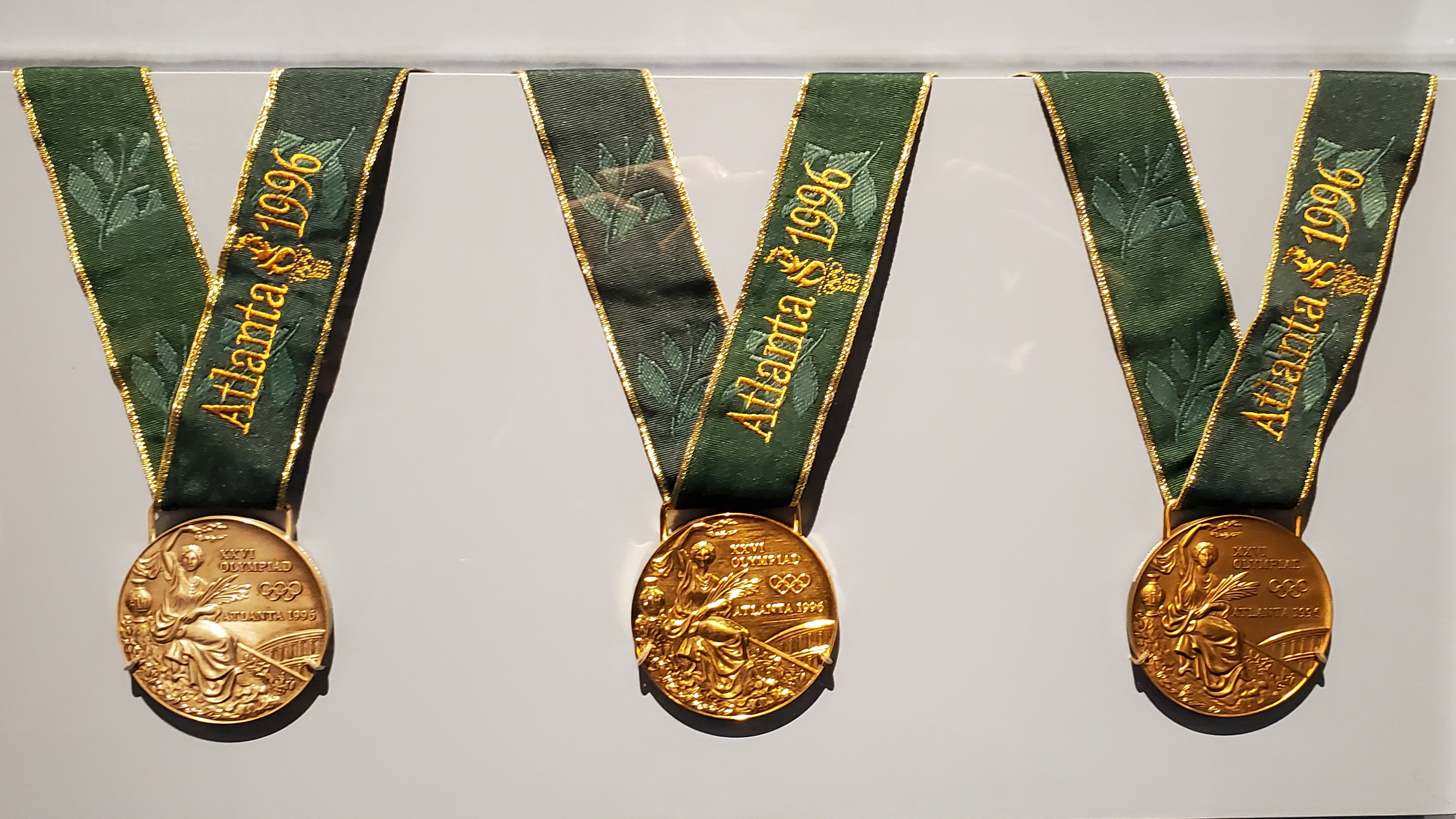
Medal designs for the 1996 Olympics

The "Look of the Games" design for Atlanta 1996 was named "Quilt of Leaves". The graphic identity featured a quilting leaf pattern. Representing a city coming together—with laurel leaves. The "Quilt of Leaves" theme appeared across official venues, signage, tickets, credentials, and even physically minted into the back of the Atlanta 1996 Olympic Medals. The logo was designed by Landor Associates, it featured the Olympic flame and stars in vibrant colors above the number 100, the stars developing from flames into a conventionally-shaped gold star, said to represent "each athlete's pursuit of excellence". The base resembled a classical Greek column to celebrate the centennial of the modern Olympic Games. The main backdrop color was: Georgia forest green. It represented green laurels branches worn by winners in ancient Greece as well as Atlanta being nicknamed "city of trees".

The colors palette featured khaki gold, tomato orange, magenta, blue and purple.

Atlanta's Olympic slogan "Come Celebrate Our Dream" was written by Jack Arogeti, a managing director at McCann-Erickson in Atlanta at the time. The slogan was selected from more than 5,000 submitted by the public to the Atlanta Convention and Visitors Bureau. Billy Payne noted that Jack "captured the spirit and our true motivation for the Olympic games."

=== Mascot ===
Izzy was an abstract, amorphous tech-generated blue fantasy figure character wearing white gloves and red shoes. In contrast to the standing tradition of mascots of national or regional significance to the city hosting. Created by John Ryan, an Atlanta animator from the DESIGNefx firm. A video game featuring the Games' mascot, Izzy's Quest for the Olympic Rings, was also released.

=== Corporate sponsorship ===
The 1996 Summer Olympics relied heavily on commercial sponsorship, 111 total domestic corporate partners. The most of any games before or since. The Atlanta-based Coca-Cola Company was the exclusive provider of soft drinks at Olympics venues, and built an attraction known as Coca-Cola Olympic City for the Games. As part of a sponsorship agreement with Columbia TriStar Television, the syndicated game shows Jeopardy! and Wheel of Fortune both produced episodes with Olympics tie-ins (including branded memorabilia and contests) for broadcast between April and July 1996. These included a Jeopardy! international tournament, and three weeks of Wheel of Fortune episodes filmed on-location at Atlanta's Fox Theatre.

The Games were affected by several instances of ambush marketing—in which companies attempt to use the Games as a means to promote their brand, in competition with the exclusive, category-based sponsorship rights issued by the Atlanta organizing committee and the IOC (which grants the rights to use Olympics-related terms and emblems in marketing). The Atlanta organizing committee threatened legal actions against advertisers whose marketing implied an official association with the Games. Several non-sponsors set up marketing activities in areas near venues, such as Samsung (competing with Motorola), which ambushed the Games with its "96 Expo". The city of Atlanta had also licensed street vendors to sell products from competitors to Olympic sponsors.

The most controversial ambush campaign was undertaken by Nike, Inc., which had begun an advertising campaign with aggressive slogans that mocked the Games' values, such as "Faster, Higher, Stronger, Badder", "If you're not here to win, you're a tourist", and "You don't win silver, you lose gold." The slogans were featured on magazine ads and billboards it purchased in Atlanta. Nike also opened a pop-up store known as the Nike Center near the Athletes' Village, which distributed Nike-branded flags to visitors (presumably to be used at events). IOC marketing director Michael Payne expressed concern for the campaign, believing that athletes could perceive them as being an insult to their accomplishments. Payne and the United States Olympic Committee's marketing director, John Krimsky, met with Howard Slusher, a subordinate of Nike co-founder Phil Knight. The meeting quickly turned aggressive, with Payne warning that the IOC could pull accreditation for Nike employees and ban the display of its logos on equipment; he also threatened to organize a press conference where silver medallists from the Games, as well as prominent Nike-sponsored athlete Michael Johnson (who attracted attention during the Games for wearing custom, gold-colored Nike shoes), would denounce the company. Faced with these threats, Nike agreed to retract most of its negative advertising and public relations stunts.

== Participating National Olympic Committees ==
Participants at the 1996 Summer Olympics Participating for the first time. Having previously participated. Not participating. Yellow circle is host city (Atlanta)

Number of athletes

A total of 197 nations, all of the then-existing and recognized National Olympic Committees, were represented at the 1996 Games, and the combined total of athletes was about 10,318. Twenty-four countries made their Olympic debut this year, including eleven of the ex-Soviet countries that competed as part of the Unified Team in 1992. Russia participated in the Summer Olympics separately from the other countries of the former Soviet Union for the first time since 1912 (when it was the Russian Empire). Russia had been a member of the Unified Team at the 1992 Summer Olympics together with 11 post-Soviet states. The Federal Republic of Yugoslavia competed as Yugoslavia. After missing the 1992 Summer Games Afghanistan and Cambodia returned to send delegations to Atlanta.

The 14 countries making their Olympic debut were: Azerbaijan, Burundi, Cape Verde, Comoros, Dominica, Guinea-Bissau, Macedonia, Nauru, Palestinian Authority, Saint Kitts and Nevis, Saint Lucia, São Tomé and Príncipe, Tajikistan and Turkmenistan. The ten countries making their Summer Olympic debut (after competing at the 1994 Winter Olympics in Lillehammer) were: Armenia, Belarus, Czech Republic, Georgia, Kazakhstan, Kyrgyzstan, Moldova, Slovakia, Ukraine and Uzbekistan. The Czech Republic and Slovakia attended the games as independent nations for the first time since the breakup of Czechoslovakia, while the rest of the nations that made their Summer Olympic debut were formerly part of the Soviet Union.

Participating National Olympic Committees
- Afghanistan (2)
- Albania (7)
- Algeria (45)
- American Samoa (7)
- Andorra (8)
- Angola (28)
- Antigua and Barbuda (13)
- Argentina (179)
- Armenia (32)
- Aruba (3)
- Australia (417)
- Austria (72)
- Azerbaijan (23)
- Bahamas (26)
- Bahrain (5)
- Bangladesh (4)
- Barbados (13)
- Belarus (157)
- Belgium (61)
- Belize (5)
- Benin (5)
- Bermuda (9)
- Bhutan (2)
- Bolivia (8)
- Bosnia and Herzegovina (9)
- Botswana (7)
- Brazil (221)
- British Virgin Islands (7)
- Brunei (1)
- Bulgaria (110)
- Burkina Faso (5)
- Burundi (7)
- Cambodia (5)
- Cameroon (15)
- Canada (303)
- Cape Verde (3)
- Cayman Islands (9)
- Central African Republic (5)
- Chad (4)
- Chile (21)
- China (294)
- Colombia (48)
- Comoros (4)
- Republic of the Congo (5)
- Cook Islands (3)
- Costa Rica (11)
- Croatia (84)
- Cuba (164)
- Cyprus (17)
- Czech Republic (115)
- Denmark (119)
- Djibouti (5)
- Dominica (6)
- Dominican Republic (16)
- Ecuador (19)
- Egypt (29)
- El Salvador (8)
- Equatorial Guinea (5)
- Estonia (43)
- Ethiopia (18)
- Fiji (17)
- Finland (76)
- France (299)
- Gabon (7)
- The Gambia (9)
- Georgia (34)
- Germany (465)
- Ghana (35)
- Great Britain (300)
- Greece (121)
- Grenada (5)
- Guam (8)
- Guatemala (26)
- Guinea (5)
- Guinea-Bissau (3)
- Guyana (7)
- Haiti (7)
- Honduras (7)
- Hong Kong (23)
- Hungary (213)
- Iceland (9)
- India (49)
- Indonesia (40)
- Iran (18)
- Iraq (3)
- Ireland (78)
- Israel (25)
- Italy (340)
- Ivory Coast (11)
- Jamaica (45)
- Japan (306)
- Jordan (5)
- Kazakhstan (96)
- Kenya (52)
- North Korea (24)
- South Korea (303)
- Kuwait (25)
- Kyrgyzstan (33)
- Laos (5)
- Latvia (47)
- Lebanon (1)
- Lesotho (9)
- Liberia (5)
- Libya (5)
- Liechtenstein (2)
- Lithuania (61)
- Luxembourg (6)
- Macedonia (11)
- Madagascar (11)
- Malawi (2)
- Malaysia (35)
- Maldives (6)
- Mali (3)
- Malta (7)
- Mauritania (4)
- Mauritius (26)
- Mexico (98)
- Moldova (40)
- Monaco (3)
- Mongolia (16)
- Morocco (34)
- Mozambique (3)
- Myanmar (3)
- Namibia (8)
- Nauru (3)
- Nepal (6)
- Netherlands (239)
- Netherlands Antilles (6)
- New Zealand (95)
- Nicaragua (26)
- Niger (3)
- Nigeria (65)
- Norway (97)
- Oman (4)
- Pakistan (24)
- Palestine (1)
- Panama (7)
- Papua New Guinea (11)
- Paraguay (7)
- Peru (29)
- Philippines (12)
- Poland (165)
- Portugal (107)
- Puerto Rico (69)
- Qatar (12)
- Romania (165)
- Russia (390)
- Rwanda (4)
- Saint Kitts and Nevis (10)
- Saint Lucia (6)
- Saint Vincent and the Grenadines (8)
- Western Samoa (5)
- San Marino (7)
- São Tomé and Príncipe (2)
- Saudi Arabia (29)
- Senegal (11)
- Seychelles (9)
- Sierra Leone (14)
- Singapore (14)
- Slovakia (71)
- Slovenia (37)
- Solomon Islands (4)
- Somalia (4)
- South Africa (84)
- Spain (289)
- Sri Lanka (9)
- Sudan (4)
- Suriname (7)
- Swaziland (6)
- Sweden (177)
- Switzerland (115)
- Syria (7)
- Chinese Taipei (74)
- Tajikistan (8)
- Tanzania (7)
- Thailand (37)
- Togo (5)
- Tonga (5)
- Trinidad and Tobago (12)
- Tunisia (51)
- Turkey (53)
- Turkmenistan (7)
- Uganda (10)
- Ukraine (231)
- United Arab Emirates (4)
- United States (646) (host)
- Uruguay (14)
- Uzbekistan (71)
- Vanuatu (4)
- Venezuela (39)
- Vietnam (6)
- Virgin Islands (12)
- Yemen (4)
- FR Yugoslavia (68)
- Zaire (14)
- Zambia (8)
- Zimbabwe (13)

=== Number of athletes by National Olympic Committee ===
10,339 athletes from 197 NOCs participated in the 1996 Summer Olympics.

IOC Letter Code	Country	Athletes
USA	United States	646
GER	Germany	465
AUS	Australia	417
RUS	Russia	390
ITA	Italy	340
JPN	Japan	306
CAN	Canada	303
KOR	South Korea	303
GBR	Great Britain	300
FRA	France	299
CHN	China	294
ESP	Spain	289
NED	Netherlands	239
UKR	Ukraine	231
BRA	Brazil	221
HUN	Hungary	213
ARG	Argentina	179
SWE	Sweden	177
POL	Poland	165
ROU	Romania	165
CUB	Cuba	164
BLR	Belarus	157
GRE	Greece	121
DEN	Denmark	119
CZE	Czech Republic	115
SUI	Switzerland	115
BUL	Bulgaria	110
POR	Portugal	107
MEX	Mexico	98
NOR	Norway	97
KAZ	Kazakhstan	96
NZL	New Zealand	95
CRO	Croatia	84
RSA	South Africa	84
IRL	Ireland	78
FIN	Finland	76
TPE	Chinese Taipei	74
AUT	Austria	72
SVK	Slovakia	71
UZB	Uzbekistan	71
PUR	Puerto Rico	69
YUG	FR Yugoslavia	68
NGR	Nigeria	65
BEL	Belgium	61
LTU	Lithuania	61
TUR	Turkey	53
KEN	Kenya	52
TUN	Tunisia	51
IND	India	49
COL	Colombia	48
LAT	Latvia	47
ALG	Algeria	45
JAM	Jamaica	45
EST	Estonia	43
INA	Indonesia	40
MDA	Moldova	40
VEN	Venezuela	39
SLO	Slovenia	37
THA	Thailand	37
GHA	Ghana	35
MAS	Malaysia	35
GEO	Georgia	34
MAR	Morocco	34
KGZ	Kyrgyzstan	33
ARM	Armenia	32
EGY	Egypt	29
PER	Peru	29
KSA	Saudi Arabia	29
ANG	Angola	28
BAH	Bahamas	26
GUA	Guatemala	26
MRI	Mauritius	26
NCA	Nicaragua	26
ISR	Israel	25
KUW	Kuwait	25
PRK	North Korea	24
PAK	Pakistan	24
AZE	Azerbaijan	23
HKG	Hong Kong	23
CHI	Chile	21
ECU	Ecuador	19
ETH	Ethiopia	18
IRI	Iran	18
CYP	Cyprus	17
FIJ	Fiji	17
DOM	Dominican Republic	16
MGL	Mongolia	16
CMR	Cameroon	15
SLE	Sierra Leone	14
SIN	Singapore	14
URU	Uruguay	14
ZAI	Zaire	14
ANT	Antigua and Barbuda	13
BAR	Barbados	13
ZIM	Zimbabwe	13
PHI	Philippines	12
QAT	Qatar	12
TRI	Trinidad and Tobago	12
ISV	Virgin Islands	12
CRC	Costa Rica	11
CIV	Ivory Coast	11
MKD	Macedonia	11
MAD	Madagascar	11
PNG	Papua New Guinea	11
SEN	Senegal	11
SKN	Saint Kitts and Nevis	10
UGA	Uganda	10
BER	Bermuda	9
BIH	Bosnia and Herzegovina	9
CAY	Cayman Islands	9
GAM	The Gambia	9
ISL	Iceland	9
LES	Lesotho	9
SEY	Seychelles	9
SRI	Sri Lanka	9
AND	Andorra	8
BOL	Bolivia	8
ESA	El Salvador	8
GUM	Guam	8
NAM	Namibia	8
VIN	Saint Vincent and the Grenadines	8
TJK	Tajikistan	8
ZAM	Zambia	8
ALB	Albania	7
ASA	American Samoa	7
BOT	Botswana	7
IVB	British Virgin Islands	7
BDI	Burundi	7
GAB	Gabon	7
GUY	Guyana	7
HAI	Haiti	7
HON	Honduras	7
MLT	Malta	7
PAN	Panama	7
PAR	Paraguay	7
SMR	San Marino	7
SUR	Suriname	7
SYR	Syria	7
TAN	Tanzania	7
TKM	Turkmenistan	7
DMA	Dominica	6
LUX	Luxembourg	6
MDV	Maldives	6
NEP	Nepal	6
AHO	Netherlands Antilles	6
LCA	Saint Lucia	6
SWZ	Swaziland	6
VIE	Vietnam	6
BRN	Bahrain	5
BIZ	Belize	5
BEN	Benin	5
BUR	Burkina Faso	5
CAM	Cambodia	5
CAF	Central African Republic	5
CGO	Republic of the Congo	5
DJI	Djibouti	5
GEQ	Equatorial Guinea	5
GRN	Grenada	5
GUI	Guinea	5
JOR	Jordan	5
LAO	Laos	5
LBR	Liberia	5
LBA	Libya	5
WSM	Western Samoa	5
TOG	Togo	5
TGA	Tonga	5
BAN	Bangladesh	4
CHA	Chad	4
COM	Comoros	4
MTN	Mauritania	4
OMA	Oman	4
RWA	Rwanda	4
SOL	Solomon Islands	4
SOM	Somalia	4
SUD	Sudan	4
UAE	United Arab Emirates	4
VAN	Vanuatu	4
YEM	Yemen	4
ARU	Aruba	3
CPV	Cape Verde	3
COK	Cook Islands	3
GBS	Guinea-Bissau	3
IRQ	Iraq	3
MLI	Mali	3
MON	Monaco	3
MOZ	Mozambique	3
MYA	Myanmar	3
NRU	Nauru	3
NIG	Niger	3
AFG	Afghanistan	2
BHU	Bhutan	2
LIE	Liechtenstein	2
MAW	Malawi	2
STP	São Tomé and Príncipe	2
BRU	Brunei	1
LIB	Lebanon	1
PLE	Palestine	1

== Calendar ==
All times are in Eastern Daylight Time (UTC-4); the other, Birmingham, Alabama, uses Central Daylight Time (UTC-5)

OC	Opening ceremony	●	Event competitions	1	Gold medal events	CC	Closing ceremony

July/August 1996		July													August				Events
July/August 1996		19th Fri	20th Sat	21st Sun	22nd Mon	23rd Tue	24th Wed	25th Thu	26th Fri	27th Sat	28th Sun	29th Mon	30th Tue	31st Wed	1st Thu	2nd Fri	3rd Sat	4th Sun	Events
Ceremonies		OC																CC	—N/a
Aquatics	Diving								●	1	●	1	●	1	●	1			38
Aquatics	Swimming		4	4	5	5	4	5	5										38
Aquatics	Synchronized swimming												●			1			38
Aquatics	Water polo		●	●	●	●	●		●	●	1								38
Archery											●	●	●	1	1	2			4
Athletics									2	4	5	8		5	4	6	9	1	44
Badminton							●	●	●	●	●	●	●	1	4				5
Baseball/Softball
Baseball/Softball	Baseball		●	●	●	●	●	●		●	●	●	●		●	1			2
Baseball/Softball	Softball			●	●	●	●	●	●	●		●	1						2
Basketball			●	●	●	●	●	●	●	●	●	●	●	●	●	●	1	1	2
Boxing			●	●	●	●	●	●	●	●	●		●	●	●	●	6	6	12
Canoeing	Slalom									2	2								16
Canoeing	Sprint												●	●	●	●	6	6	16
Cycling	Road cycling			1										1			2		14
Cycling	Track cycling						1	1		2	4								14
Cycling	Mountain biking												2						14
Equestrian				●	●	●	1	●	1	●	1	●		●	1		1	1	6
Fencing			1	2	2	1	2	2											10
Field hockey			●	●	●	●	●	●	●	●	●	●	●	●	1	1			2
Football			●	●	●	●	●	●		●	●		●	●	1	●	1		2
Gymnastics	Artistic		●	●	1	1	1	1			6	4							16
Gymnastics	Rhythmic														●	1	●	1	16
Handball							●	●	●	●	●	●	●	●	●	●	1	1	2
Judo			2	2	2	2	2	2	2										14
Modern pentathlon													1						1
Rowing				●	●	●	●	●	●	7	7								14
Sailing					●	●	●	●	●	●	●	4	1	2	2	1			10
Shooting			2	2	1	2	3	1	3	1									15
Table tennis						●	●	●	●	●	●	1	1	1	1				4
Tennis						●	●	●	●	●	●	●	●	●	●	2	2		4
Volleyball	Beach volleyball					●	●	●	●	1	1								4
Volleyball	Indoor volleyball		●	●	●	●	●	●	●	●	●	●	●	●	●	●	1	1	4
Weightlifting			1	1	1	1	1		1	1	1	1	1						10
Wrestling			●	5	●	5							●	5	●	5			20
Daily medal events			10	17	12	17	15	12	14	19	28	19	7	17	15	21	30	18	271
Cumulative total			10	27	39	56	71	83	97	116	144	163	170	187	202	223	253	271	271
July/August 1996		19th Fri	20th Sat	21st Sun	22nd Mon	23rd Tue	24th Wed	25th Thu	26th Fri	27th Sat	28th Sun	29th Mon	30th Tue	31st Wed	1st Thu	2nd Fri	3rd Sat	4th Sun	Total events
July/August 1996		July													August				Total events

== The Games ==
=== Ceremonies ===
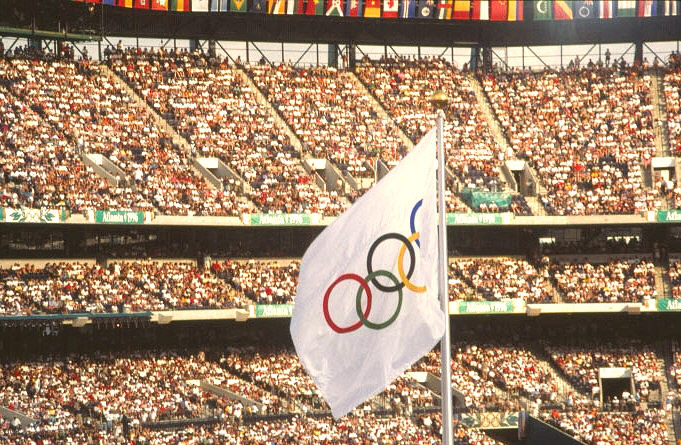
The Olympic flag waves at the 1996 Games.

The ceremony began with a 60-second countdown, which included footage from all of the previous Olympic Games at twenty-two seconds. There was then a flashback to the closing ceremony of the 1992 Olympics in Barcelona, showing the then president of the IOC, Juan Antonio Samaranch, inviting the athletes to compete in Atlanta in 1996. Then, spirits ascended in the northwest corner of the stadium, each representing one of the colors in the Olympic rings. The spirits called the tribes of the world which, after mixed percussion, formed the Olympic rings while the youth of Atlanta formed the number 100. Famed film score composer John Williams wrote the official overture for the 1996 Olympics, called "Summon the Heroes"; this was his second overture for Olympic games, the first being "Olympic Fanfare and Theme" written for the 1984 Summer Olympics. Céline Dion performed David Foster's official 1996 Olympics song "The Power of the Dream", accompanied by Foster on the piano, the Atlanta Symphony Orchestra and the Centennial Choir (comprising Morehouse College Glee Club, Spelman College Glee Club and the Atlanta Symphony Orchestra Chorus). Gladys Knight sang Georgia's official state song, "Georgia on My Mind".

There was a showcase entitled "Welcome To The World", featuring cheerleaders, Chevrolet pick-up trucks, marching bands, and steppers, which highlighted the American youth and a typical Saturday college football game in the South, including the wave commonly produced by spectators in sporting events around the world. There was another showcase entitled "Summertime" which focused on Atlanta and the Old South, emphasizing its beauty, spirit, music, history, culture, and rebirth after the American Civil War. The ceremony also featured a memorable dance tribute to the athletes and to the goddesses of victory of the ancient Greek Olympics, using silhouette imagery. The accompanying music, "The Tradition of the Games", was composed by Basil Poledouris.

Muhammad Ali lit the Olympic cauldron and later received a replacement gold medal for his boxing victory in the 1960 Summer Olympics. For the torch ceremony, more than 10,000 Olympic torches were manufactured by the American Meter Company, electroplated by Klein Plating Works, and polished by Erie Plating Company. Each torch weighed about 3.5 pounds (1.6 kg) and was made primarily of aluminum, with a Georgia pecan wood handle and gold ornamentation.

The city of Savannah, Georgia, host of the yachting events, also held their own opening ceremony on the first day of their competitions. The event was headlined by a performance by country musician Trisha Yearwood.

=== Sports ===
The 1996 Summer Olympic program featured 271 events in 26 sports. Softball, beach volleyball and mountain biking debuted on the Olympic program, together with women's football, lightweight events in rowing, Women's 4 × 200 metre freestyle relay in swimming, the Women's épée in fencing and the group all-around event in rhythmic gymnastics.

1996 Summer Olympics Sports Program

- Aquatics
  - Diving (4)
  - Swimming (32)
  - Synchronized swimming (1)
  - Water polo (1)
- Archery (4)
- Athletics (44)
- Badminton (5)
- Baseball (1)
- Basketball (2)
- Boxing (12)
- Canoeing
  - Sprint (12)
  - Slalom (4)
- Cycling
  - Road (4)
  - Track (8)
  - Mountain biking (2)
- Equestrian
  - Dressage (2)
  - Eventing (2)
  - Show jumping (2)
- Fencing (10)
- Field hockey (2)
- Football (2)
- Gymnastics
  - Artistic (14)
  - Rhythmic (2)
- Handball (2)
- Judo (14)
- Modern pentathlon (1)
- Rowing (14)
- Sailing (10)
- Shooting (15)
- Softball (1)
- Table tennis (4)
- Tennis (4)
- Volleyball
  - Volleyball (2)
  - Beach volleyball (2)
- Weightlifting (10)
- Wrestling
  - Freestyle (10)
  - Greco-Roman (10)

=== Achievements ===
- In women's gymnastics, Ukrainian Lilia Podkopayeva became the all-around Olympic champion. Podkopayeva also won a second gold medal in the floor exercise final and a silver on the beam – becoming the only female gymnast since Nadia Comăneci to win an individual event gold after winning the all-around title in the same Olympics. Kerri Strug of the United States women's gymnastics team vaulted with an injured ankle and landed on one foot, winning the first women's team gold medal for the US. Shannon Miller won the gold medal on the balance beam event, the first time an American gymnast had won an individual gold medal in non-boycotted Olympic games. The Spanish team won the first gold medal in the new competition of women's rhythmic group all-around. The team was formed by Estela Giménez, Marta Baldó, Nuria Cabanillas, Lorena Guréndez, Estíbaliz Martínez and Tania Lamarca.
- Amy Van Dyken won four gold medals in the Olympic swimming pool, the first American woman to win four titles in a single Olympiad. Penny Heyns, swimmer of South Africa, won the gold medals in both the 100-meter and 200-meter breaststroke events. Michelle Smith of Ireland won three gold medals and a bronze in swimming. She remains her nation's most decorated Olympian. However, her victories were overshadowed by doping allegations even though she did not test positive in 1996. She received a four-year suspension in 1998 for tampering with a urine sample, though her medals and records were allowed to stand.

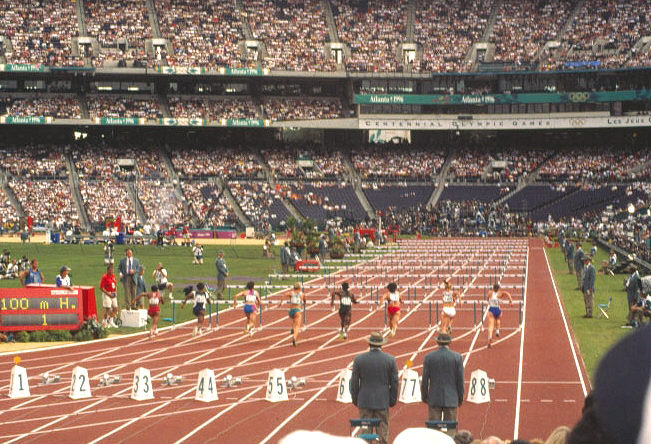
Women's 100 m hurdles at the Olympic stadium

- In track and field, Donovan Bailey of Canada won the men's 100 m, setting a new world record of 9.84 seconds at that time. He also anchored his team's gold in the 4 × 100 m relay. Michael Johnson won gold in both the 200 m and 400 m, setting a new world record of 19.32 seconds in the 200 m. Marie-José Pérec equaled Johnson's performance, although without a world record, by winning the rare 200 m/400 m double. Carl Lewis won his 4th long jump gold medal at the age of 35.

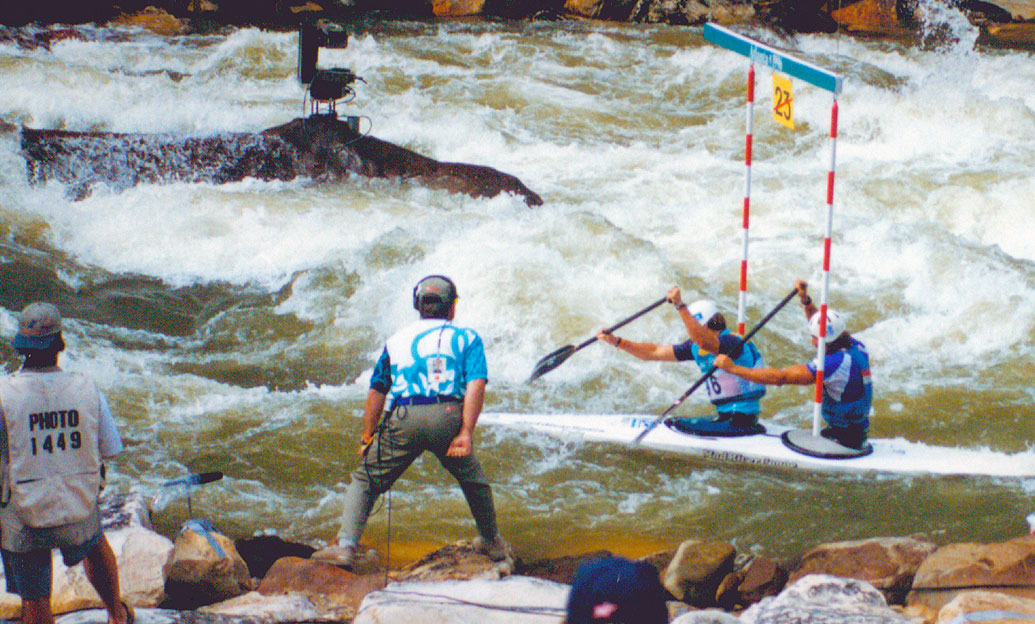
Whitewater slalom events at the Ocoee Whitewater Center

- In tennis, Andre Agassi won the gold medal, which eventually made him the first man and second singles player overall (after his eventual wife, Steffi Graf) to win the career Golden Slam, which consists of an Olympic gold medal and victories in the singles tournaments held at professional tennis' four major events (Australian Open, French Open, Wimbledon, and US Open).
- There were a series of national firsts realized during the Games. Deon Hemmings became the first woman to win an Olympic gold medal for Jamaica and the English-speaking West Indies. Lee Lai Shan won a gold medal in sailing, the only Olympic medal that Hong Kong ever won as a British colony (1842–1997). This meant that for the only time, the colonial flag of Hong Kong was raised to the accompaniment of the British national anthem "God Save the Queen", as Hong Kong's sovereignty was later transferred to China in 1997.
- The U.S. women's soccer team won the gold medal in the first-ever women's football event.
- For the first time, Olympic medals were won by athletes from Armenia, Azerbaijan, Belarus, Burundi, Czech Republic, Ecuador, Georgia, Hong Kong, Kazakhstan, Moldova, Mozambique, Slovakia, Tonga, Ukraine, and Uzbekistan.
- Another first in Atlanta was that this was the first Summer Olympics ever that not a single nation swept all three medals in a single event.

=== Medal table ===
These are the top ten nations that won medals at the 1996 Games.

* Host nation (United States)

1996 Summer Olympics medal table
Rank	NOC	Gold	Silver	Bronze	Total
1	United States*	44	32	25	101
2	Russia	26	21	16	63
3	Germany	20	18	27	65
4	China	16	22	12	50
5	France	15	7	15	37
6	Italy	13	10	12	35
7	Australia	9	9	23	41
8	Cuba	9	8	8	25
9	Ukraine	9	2	12	23
10	South Korea	7	15	5	27
11–79	Remaining NOCs	103	129	143	375
Totals (79 entries)		271	273	298	842

== Broadcasting rights ==
Domestic network NBC bought the broadcasting rights for US$456 million. The European Broadcasting Union paid US$240 million.

Other broadcasters included:

- Brazil: Rede Globo, Rede Manchete, Rede Bandeirantes, Rede Record, SBT, CNT, TVE Brasil, ESPN Brasil, PSN Brasil
- China: CCTV
- Canada: CBC
- France: TF1, FTV, Eurosport
- Germany: ARD, ZDF
- India: Doordarshan
- Indonesia: TVRI, RCTI, SCTV, Anteve and Indosiar
- Italy: RAI
- Japan: Japan Consortium
- Malaysia: RTM
- Philippines: PTV
- Russia: Public Russian Television, VGTRK Olympiade
- Singapore: Singapore Television Twelve
- South Korea: KBS, MBC, SBS
- United Kingdom: BBC
- United States: NBC, MSNBC and CNBC

== Centennial Olympic Park bombing ==
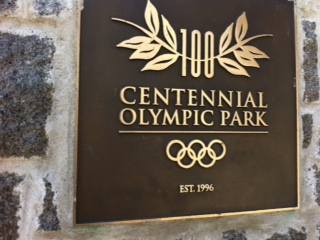
The marker at the entrance to Centennial Park in downtown Atlanta

The 1996 Olympics were marred by the Centennial Olympic Park bombing, which occurred on July 27. Security guard Richard Jewell discovered the pipe bomb and immediately notified law enforcement, helping to evacuate as many people as possible from the area before it exploded. Although Jewell's quick actions are credited for saving many lives, the bombing killed spectator Alice Hawthorne, wounded 111 others, and caused the death of Melih Uzunyol by a heart attack. Jewell was later considered a suspect in the bombing but was never charged, and he was cleared in October 1996.

Fugitive Eric Rudolph was arrested in May 2003 and charged with the Olympic Park bombing as well as the bombings of two abortion clinics and a gay nightclub. At his trial two years later, he confessed to all charges and afterwards released a statement, saying: "the purpose of the attack on July 27th was to confound, anger and embarrass the Washington government in the eyes of the world for its abominable sanctioning of abortion on demand." He received four life sentences without parole, to be served at USP Florence ADMAX near Florence, Colorado.

== Legacy ==
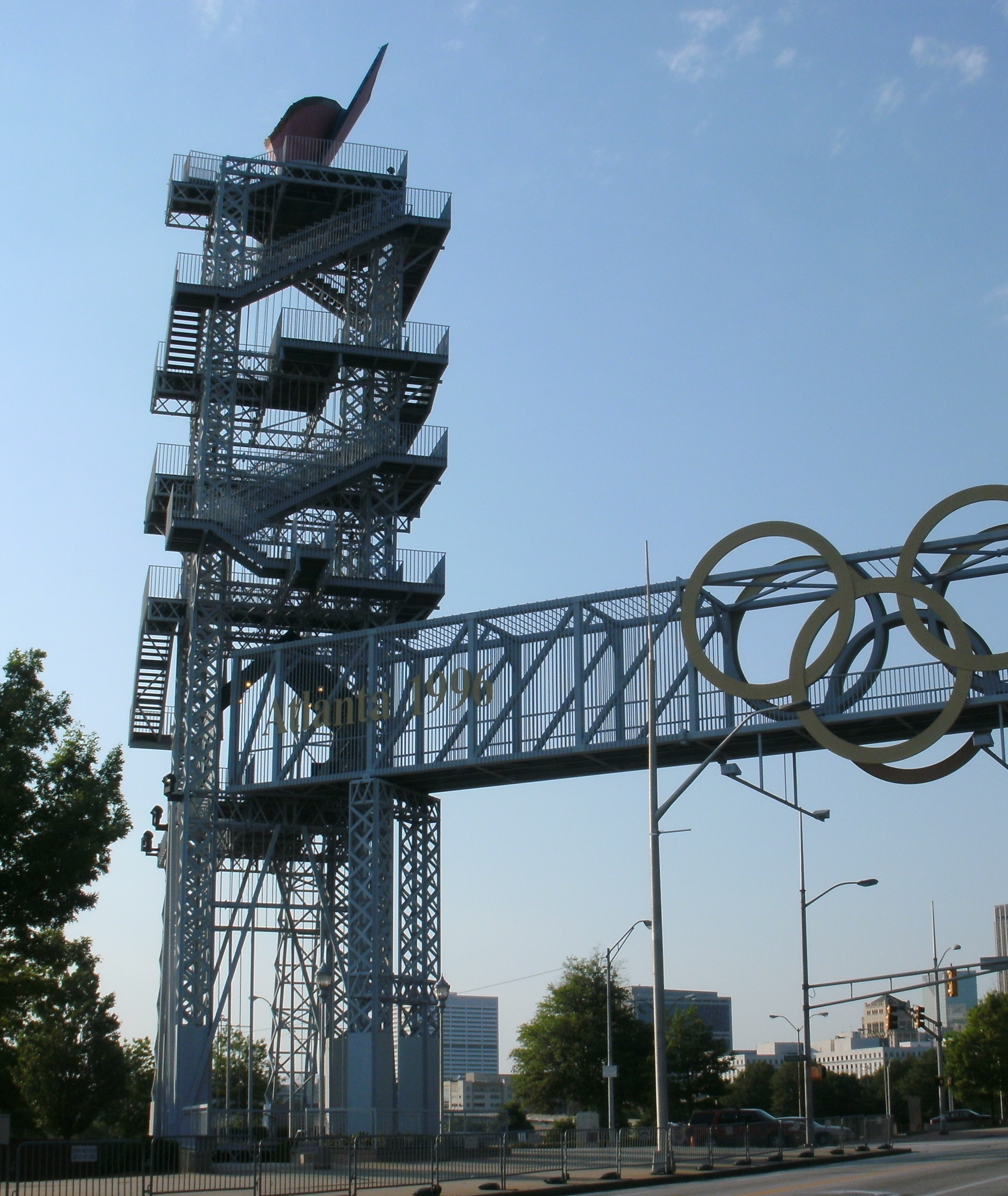
The 1996 Olympic cauldron, designed by Siah Armajani

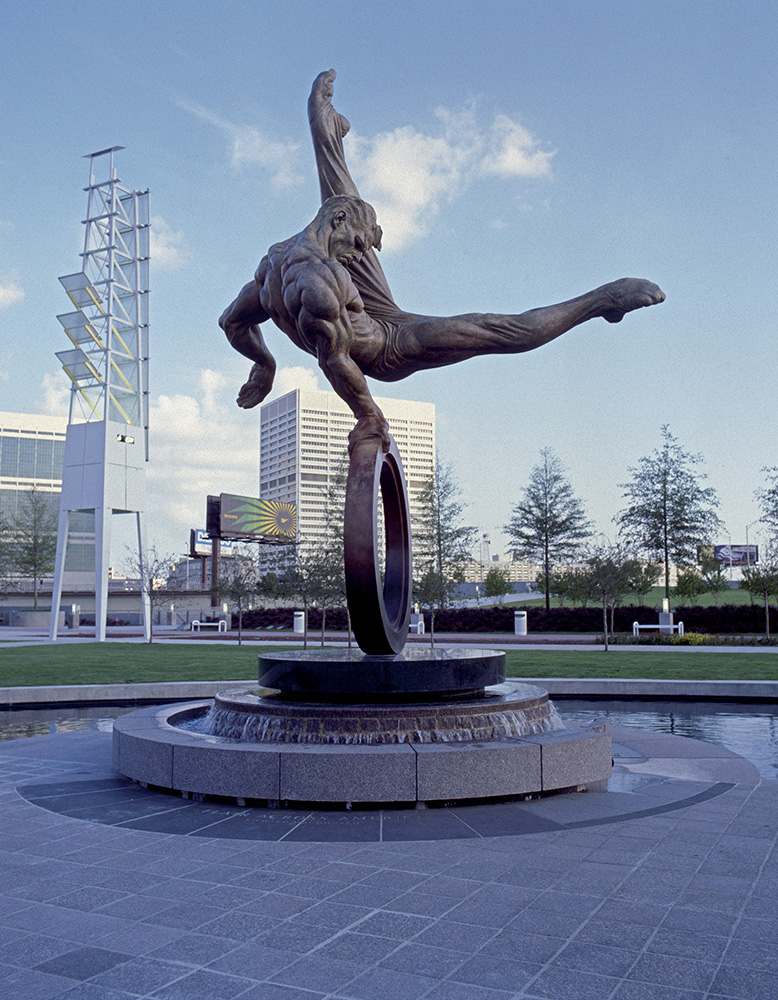
The Flair Monument, erected in remembrance of the 1996 Games

Preparations for the Olympics lasted more than seven years and had an economic impact of at least US$5.14 billion. Over two million visitors came to Atlanta, and approximately 3.5 billion people around the world watched at least some of the events on television. Although marred by the tragedy of the Centennial Olympic Park bombing, the Games were a financial success, due in part to TV rights contracts and sponsorships at record levels. Atlanta also set a new record for the most tickets sold at a single Games (8.3 million), and held it until 2024.

Beyond international recognition, the Games resulted in many modern infrastructure improvements. The mid-rise dormitories built for the Olympic Village, which became the first residential housing for Georgia State University (Georgia State Village), are now used by the Georgia Institute of Technology (North Avenue Apartments). As designed, the Centennial Olympic Stadium was converted into Turner Field after the Paralympics, which became the home of the Atlanta Braves Major League Baseball team from 1997 to 2016. The Braves' former home, Atlanta–Fulton County Stadium, was demolished in 1997 and the site became a parking lot for Turner Field; the Omni Coliseum was demolished the same year to make way for State Farm Arena. The city's permanent memorial to the 1996 Olympics is Centennial Olympic Park, which was built as a focal point for the Games. The park initiated a revitalization of the surrounding area and now serves as the hub for Atlanta's tourism district.

In November 2016, a commemorative plaque was unveiled for Centennial Olympic Park to honor the 20th anniversary of the Games.

Following the Braves' departure from Turner Field to Truist Park in 2017, Georgia State University acquired the former Olympic Stadium and surrounding parking lots. It reconfigured the stadium for a second time into Center Parc Stadium for its college football team.

The 1996 Olympic cauldron was originally built and placed at the intersection of Fulton Street and Capitol Avenue, near the Centennial Olympic Stadium. After the Paralympics, in order to make room for the stadium conversion, the Olympic cauldron was moved (except its ramp, which was demolished) to the intersection of Capitol Avenue and Fulton Street in 1997, where it has stayed since. Since Georgia State University's acquisition of the former Olympic Stadium and surrounding lots, there has been proposals and growing calls to move the Olympic cauldron to Centennial Olympic Park.

The Olympic cauldron was re-lit in February 2020 for the 2020 U.S. Olympic Marathon Trials.

The 1996 Olympics are the most recent edition of the Summer Olympics to be held in the United States. Los Angeles will host the 2028 Summer Olympics, 32 years after the Games were held in Atlanta.

=== Retrospect ===
At the closing ceremony, IOC President Juan Antonio Samaranch said in his closing speech, "Well done, Atlanta" and simply called the Games "most exceptional." This broke precedent for Samaranch, who had traditionally labeled each Games "the best Olympics ever" at each closing ceremony, a practice he resumed at the subsequent Winter Games in Nagano in 1998.

A report prepared after the Games by European Olympic officials was critical of Atlanta's performance in several key areas, including the level of crowding in the Olympic Village, the quality of available food, the accessibility and convenience of transportation, and the Games' general atmosphere of commercialism. IOC vice-president Dick Pound responded to criticism of the commercialization of these Games, stating that they still adhered to a historic policy barring the display of advertising within venues, and that "you have to look to the private sector for at least a portion of the funding, and unless you're looking for handouts, you're dealing with people who are investing business assets, and they have to get a return."

In 1997, Athens was awarded the 2004 Summer Olympics. Along with addressing the shortcomings of its 1996 bid, it was lauded for its efforts to promote the traditional values of the Olympic Games, which some IOC observers felt had been lost due to the over-commercialization of the 1996 Games. However, the 2004 Games heavily relied on public funding and eventually failed to make a profit, which some have claimed contributed to the financial crisis in Greece.

The financial struggles faced by many later Games, such as the 2006 Winter Olympics in Turin and the 2016 Summer Olympics in Rio de Janeiro, have caused some to offer more positive reappraisals of the management of the 1996 Summer Games. Former JPMorgan Chase president (and torchbearer) Kabir Sehgal noted that in contrast to many later Olympics, those of 1996 were financially viable, had a positive economic impact on the city, and most of the facilities constructed continued to be used after the Games. Sehgal contrasted the 1996 Games' "grassroots" effort backed almost entirely by private funding, with the only significant public spending coming from infrastructure associated with the Games, to modern "top-down" bids, instigated by local governments and reliant on taxpayer funding, making them unpopular among citizens who may not necessarily be interested. The 2028 Summer Olympics in Los Angeles will rely almost entirely on private funding, with the city of Los Angeles and state of California each intending to provide up to $250 million in funding in the event of shortfalls, and the U.S. federal government providing funding solely for security.

== See also ==
- 1996 Summer Paralympics
- Olympic Games held in the United States
  - 1904 Summer Olympics – St. Louis
  - 1932 Summer Olympics – Los Angeles
  - 1932 Winter Olympics – Lake Placid
  - 1960 Winter Olympics – Squaw Valley
  - 1980 Winter Olympics – Lake Placid
  - 1984 Summer Olympics – Los Angeles
  - 1996 Summer Olympics – Atlanta
  - 2002 Winter Olympics – Salt Lake City
  - 2028 Summer Olympics – Los Angeles
  - 2034 Winter Olympics – Salt Lake City
- List of IOC country codes
- Use of performance-enhancing drugs in the Olympic Games – 1996 Atlanta
