= Nuria Cabanillas =

Spanish rhythmic gymnast

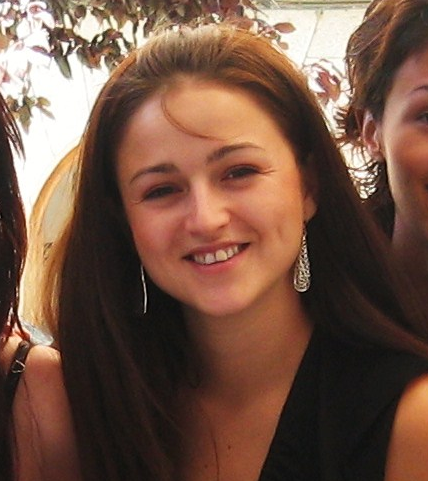

Personal information
- Full name: Nuria Cabanillas Provencio
- Born: 9 August 1980 (age 46)

Gymnastics career
- Country represented: Spain
- Retired: yes
Medal record
Olympic Games
Gold medal – first place	1996 Atlanta	Group All-around
World Championships
Gold medal – first place	1995 Vienna	3 balls/2 ribbons
Gold medal – first place	1996 Budapest	3 balls/2 ribbons
Silver medal – second place	1995 Vienna	Group All-around
Silver medal – second place	1995 Vienna	5 hoops
Silver medal – second place	1996 Budapest	Group All-around
European Championships
Silver medal – second place	1995 Prague	3 balls/2 ribbons
Bronze medal – third place	1995 Prague	Group All-around
Bronze medal – third place	1995 Prague	5 hoops

Nuria Cabanillas Provencio (born 9 August 1980) is a Spanish rhythmic gymnast and Olympic Champion. She won a gold medal with the Spanish group at the 1996 Summer Olympics in Atlanta. The team was formed by Nuria, Estela Giménez, Marta Baldó, Lorena Guréndez, Estíbaliz Martínez and Tania Lamarca. Also she was three times world champion: two in 3 balls/2 ribbons and one in 3 ribbons/2 hoops. Nuria Cabanillas Provencio retired in 1999.

== See also ==
- List of gymnasts
- List of Olympic medalists in gymnastics (women)
- Gymnastics at the Pan American Games
- World Rhythmic Gymnastics Championships
- Gymnastics at the World Games
- Rhythmic Gymnastics European Championships
