= Tania Lamarca =

Spanish rhythmic gymnast

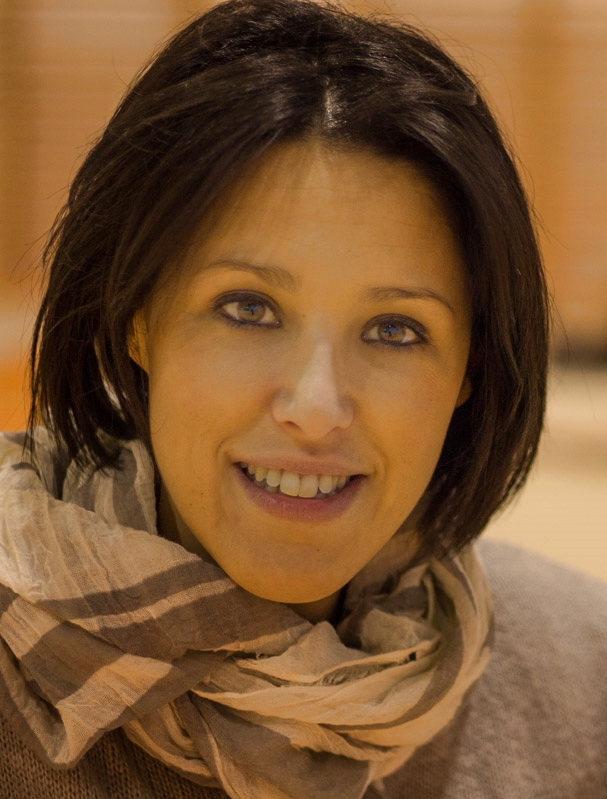
- Lamarca in 2016

Personal information
- Full name: Tania Lamarca Celada
- Born: 30 April 1980 (age 46) Vitoria-Gasteiz, Spain

Gymnastics career
- Discipline: Rhythmic gymnastics
- Country represented: Spain; (1995 – 1997)
Medal record
Olympic Games
Gold medal – first place	1996 Atlanta	Group All-around
World Championships
Gold medal – first place	1995 Vienna	3 balls/2 ribbons
Gold medal – first place	1996 Budapest	3 balls/2 ribbons
Silver medal – second place	1995 Vienna	Group All-around
Silver medal – second place	1995 Vienna	5 hoops
Silver medal – second place	1996 Budapest	Group All-around
European Championships
Silver medal – second place	1995 Prague	3 balls/2 ribbons
Silver medal – second place	1997 Patras	5 balls
Bronze medal – third place	1995 Prague	Group All-around
Bronze medal – third place	1995 Prague	5 hoops
Bronze medal – third place	1997 Patras	3 balls/2 ribbons

Tania Lamarca Celada (born 30 April 1980 in Vitoria-Gasteiz, Spain) is a former Spanish rhythmic gymnast and Olympic medallist. She won a gold medal with the Spanish group at the 1996 Summer Olympics in Atlanta. The team was formed by Tania, Estela Giménez, Marta Baldó, Nuria Cabanillas, Lorena Guréndez and Estíbaliz Martínez. Also she was two times world champion in 3 balls/2 ribbons.

In 1994, she was the Spanish individual junior champion with Club Aurrera. In 1995, she became part of the Spain national gymnastics team in the team competitions. Since then, all the medals she obtained in official competitions were obtained as a member of the Spain's team. Her first important competition was the European Championship in Prague, in which she was proclaimed sub-champion of Europe in 3 balls and 2 ribbons, besides taking another two bronze medals in the general competition and in the final of 5 rings. That same year she was proclaimed world champion in the modality of 3 balls and 2 ribbons in the World Championship in Vienna. In addition to this gold medal, she won two silver medals in the general competition and in the final of 5 hoops.

In 1996, she won his second world title in the final of 3 balls and 2 ribbons at the World Championship in Budapest, where he also won the silver medal in the general competition. That year she achieved the greatest success of her sports career by becoming Olympic champion in the rhythmic gymnastics team modality in the Atlanta Olympic Games, together with her teammates Marta Baldó, Nuria Cabanillas, Estela Giménez, Lorena Guréndez and Estíbaliz Martínez. After this achievement, the group was baptized by the media as the Golden Girls. In 1997, she was runner-up in Europe in 5 balls and bronze in 3 balls and 2 ribbons in the European Championship in Patras.

After her retirement, she obtained the title of National Rhythmic Gymnastics Coach, being a coach at school level in Vitoria, Zaragoza and Escarrilla, as well as teaching sports such as snowboarding for 5 years at the Aramón Formigal station, where she also worked as an administrator. In 2008, she published his autobiography, Tears for a Medal, written with the journalist Cristina Gallo. In 2013, the documentary Las Niñas de Oro (The Golden Girls), directed by Carlos Beltrán, was released on YouTube. It tells the story of the Olympic champion team in Atlanta through interviews with the gymnasts themselves, and in 2016 she attended the 20th Anniversary Gala of the gold medal in Atlanta '96 in Badajoz with the rest of the team. She has received several awards, including the Olympic Order from the Spanish Olympic Committee (1996), the Gold Plaque of the Royal Order of Sports Merit (1996), the Baron de Güell Cup at the National Sports Awards (1997), and the Gold Medal of the Royal Order of Sports Merit (2015).

In 2020, she lives in Escarrilla, teaches annually at the Tania Lamarca Rhythmic Gymnastics Campus, gives numerous lectures on the knowledge and values that her sports experience has brought her, and is a member of the Sport & Play sports coaching team. In 2016, she was a candidate for the presidency of the Alava Gymnastics Federation, and for 2017 she presented her sportswear line.

== Beginnings and first competitions ==
Lamarca trained with Iratxe Aurrekoetxea at the Abetxuko Sports Centre during his time at Club Aurrera.

An uncle of hers, José Luis Lamarca, had been a football player in teams such as Deportivo Alavés, Club Deportivo Vitoria or Club Deportivo Aurrera in the 60s and 70s. Tania started rhythmic gymnastics at the age of 5, in 1985, at the Colegio Canciller Ayala in Vitoria as part of her extracurricular activities. Later she joined the ranks of Club Arabatxo, where she was trained by Agurtzane Ibargutxi in the gymnasium of the Fundación Estadio. In 1991, she participated in her first Spanish Championship, held in Torrevieja.

Shortly afterwards she moved to a school in the Town Hall trained by Iratxe Aurrekoetxea, which soon became Club IVEF. There he trained alternatively for about two years both in the European Civic Centre and in the IVEF (Basque Institute of Physical Education) sports centre, which is now the Faculty of Physical Activity and Sport Sciences at the University of the Basque Country. The club later became a section of Club Deportivo Aurrera de Vitoria, then called Club Aurrera, although in 1996 it became independent and was renamed Club Beti Aurrera, which is its current name. During his time at the Aurrera, he always trained under Aurrekoetxea at the Abetxuko Sports Centre (Vitoria). Other famous national gymnasts would emerge from the Aurrera, such as Estíbaliz Martínez or Almudena Cid. In 1994, Tania was proclaimed Spanish Junior Champion at the Spanish Individual "B" Championship, held in Guadalajara, where she won the gold medal in both the general competition and the finals of each of the four apparatus (hoop, mallet, ribbon and hands-free).

The Moscardó Gymnasium, in the Salamanca district (Madrid), was the training ground for the national rhythmic gymnastics team until 1997.

In September 1994, she went to her first control in Madrid to join the national team. There, her club mate, Estíbaliz Martínez, would be selected. Tania, however, was not chosen due to her height of 1.54m, which was below the 1.60m sought by the national coach, Emilia Boneva. After her coach told her the reasons, Tania thought about retiring from gymnastics. However, encouraged by Iratxe Aurrekoetxea and the club's physical trainer, Javi Orbañanos, she continued training in Vitoria with the aim of convincing the coach of her technical quality in the following championships.

In an interview with ETB in 1995, Aurrekoetxea, asked about Lamarca's characteristics, besides highlighting her technical preparation and physical qualities, referred to her as a "very hard-working" gymnast, pointing out that "everything she has achieved she has achieved because she is always training, and training, and training, every day". In a 2016 interview with On the Tapestry, her later coach Emilia Boneva also noted that "[Tania] was the little 'worker bee', for her, there was no 'I can't' or 'I don't want to'".

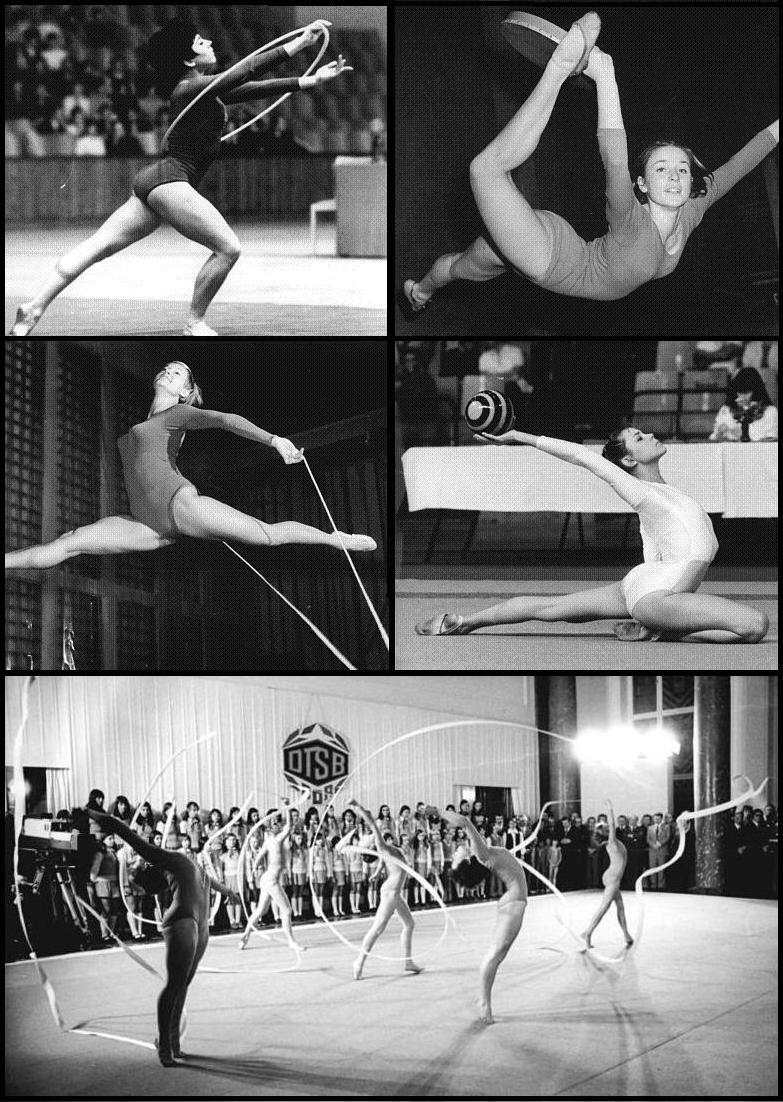
Rhythmic gymnasts composition

== See also ==
- List of gymnasts
- List of Olympic medalists in gymnastics (women)
- Gymnastics at the Pan American Games
- World Rhythmic Gymnastics Championships
- Gymnastics at the World Games
- Rhythmic Gymnastics European Championships
