= Estíbaliz Martínez =

Spanish rhythmic gymnast

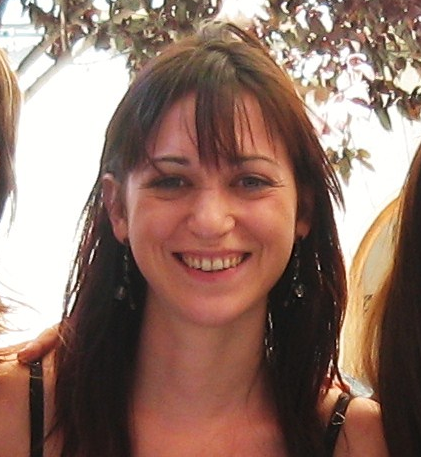

Medal record

Women's rhythmic gymnastics

Representing Spain

Olympic Games
Gold medal – first place	1996 Atlanta	Group All-around

Estíbaliz Martínez Yerro (Note: In this Spanish name, the first or paternal surname is Martínez and the second or maternal family name is Yerro.) (born 9 May 1980 in Vitoria) is a Spanish rhythmic gymnast and Olympic Champion. She competed at the 1996 Summer Olympics in Atlanta, and won a gold medal with the Spanish group. The team was formed by Estíbaliz, Estela Giménez, Marta Baldó, Nuria Cabanillas, Lorena Guréndez and Tania Lamarca. Also she was two times world champion in 3 balls/2 ribbons.

== See also ==
- List of gymnasts
- List of Olympic medalists in gymnastics (women)
- Gymnastics at the Pan American Games
- World Rhythmic Gymnastics Championships
- Gymnastics at the World Games
- Rhythmic Gymnastics European Championships
