= Estela Giménez =

Spanish rhythmic gymnast

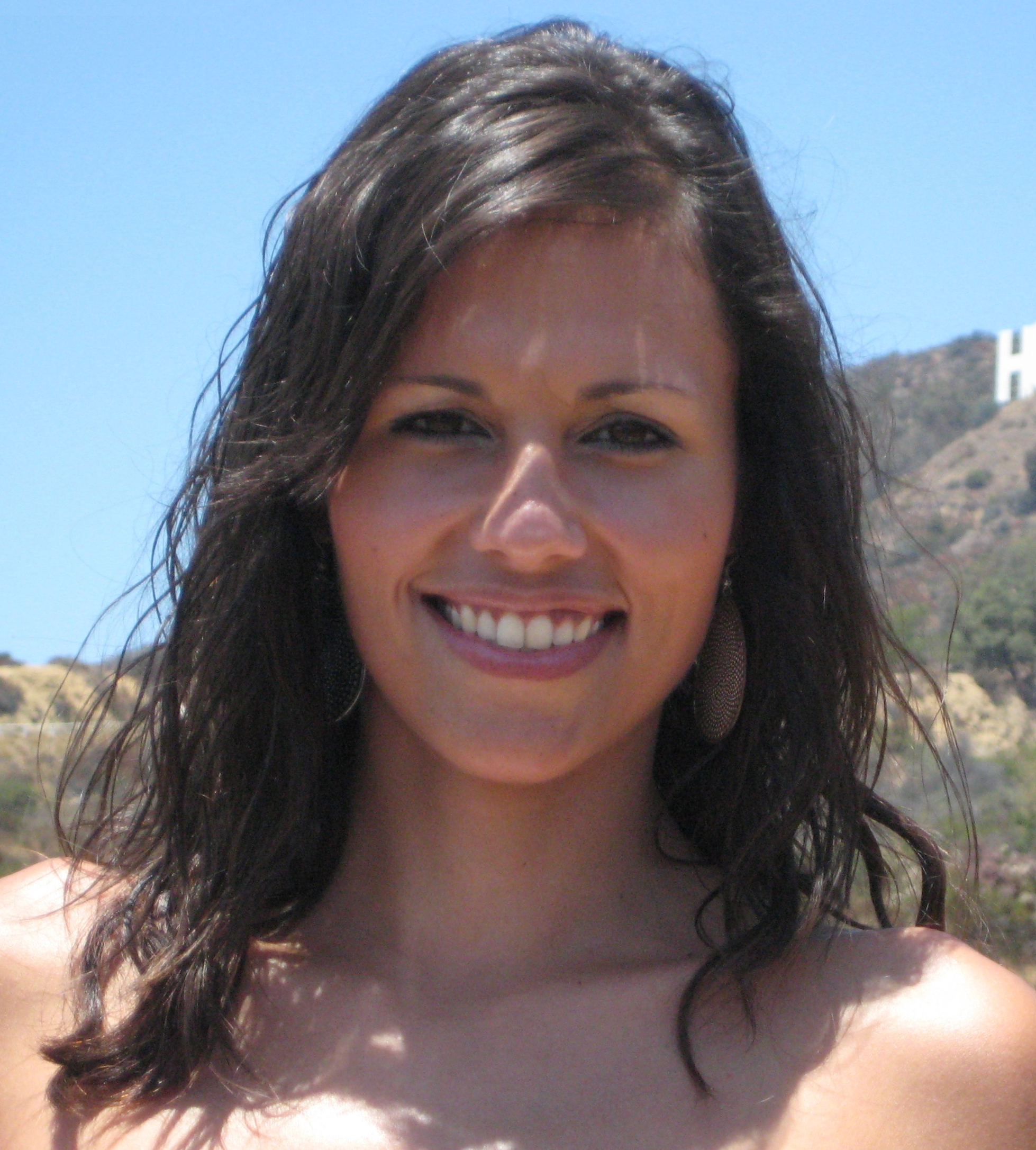

Personal information
- Born: 29 March 1979 (age 47) Madrid

Gymnastics career
- Discipline: Rhythmic gymnastics
- Country represented: Spain (1994 - 1997)
Medal record
Olympic Games
Gold medal – first place	1996 Atlanta	Group All-around
World Championships
Gold medal – first place	1995 Vienna	3 balls/2 ribbons
Gold medal – first place	1996 Budapest	3 balls/2 ribbons
Silver medal – second place	1994 Paris	Group All-around
Silver medal – second place	1995 Vienna	Group All-around
Silver medal – second place	1995 Vienna	5 hoops
Silver medal – second place	1996 Budapest	Group All-around
Bronze medal – third place	1994 Paris	6 ropes
Bronze medal – third place	1994 Paris	4 hoops/2 clubs
European Championships
Silver medal – second place	1995 Prague	3 balls/2 ribbons
Bronze medal – third place	1995 Prague	Group All-around
Bronze medal – third place	1995 Prague	5 hoops

Estela Giménez Cid (Note: In this Spanish name, the first or paternal surname is Giménez and the second or maternal family name is Cid.) (born 29 March 1979 in Madrid, Spain) is a Spanish former rhythmic gymnast who won a gold medal at the 1996 Summer Olympics in the group all-around event. The team was formed by Giménez, Marta Baldó, Nuria Cabanillas, Lorena Guréndez, Estíbaliz Martínez and Tania Lamarca. She won the world championship twice in the three balls/two ribbons discipline.

She was featured on the cover of the Your Shape game for Wii. She was the host of Insert Coin on AXN Spain from 2008 to 2012.

== See also ==
- List of gymnasts
- List of Olympic medalists in gymnastics (women)
- World Rhythmic Gymnastics Championships
- Gymnastics at the World Games
- Rhythmic Gymnastics European Championships
