= Marta Baldó =

Spanish rhythmic gymnast (born 1979)

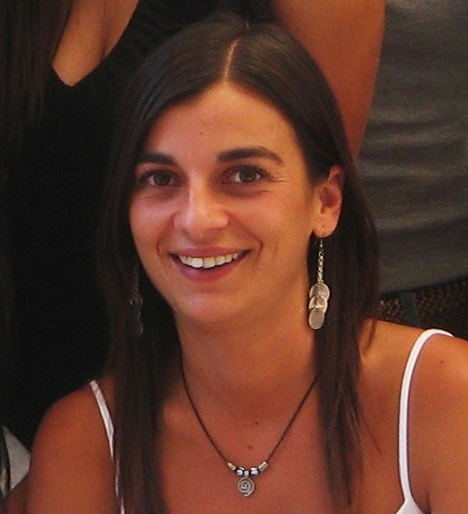
- Full name: Marta Baldó Marín
- Born: 8 April 1979 (age 47) Villajoyosa

Gymnastics career
- Country represented: Spain (1995 - 1997)
Medal record
Olympic Games
Gold medal – first place	1996 Atlanta	Group All-around
European Championships
Silver medal – second place	1995 Prague	3 balls/2 ribbons
Bronze medal – third place	1995 Prague	Group All-around
Bronze medal – third place	1995 Prague	5 hoops

Marta Baldó Marín (born 8 April 1979 in Villajoyosa, Spain) is a Spanish rhythmic gymnast and Olympic Champion. She won a gold medal with the Spanish group at the 1996 Summer Olympics in Atlanta. The team was formed by Marta, Estela Giménez, Nuria Cabanillas, Lorena Guréndez, Estíbaliz Martínez and Tania Lamarca. She has also won bronze, silver and gold metals at the rhythmic gymnastics World Championships, and silver and bronze metals at the European championships.

== See also ==
- List of gymnasts
- List of Olympic medalists in gymnastics (women)
- Gymnastics at the Pan American Games
- World Rhythmic Gymnastics Championships
- Gymnastics at the World Games
- Rhythmic Gymnastics European Championships
