= Sara Bayón =

Spanish gymnast

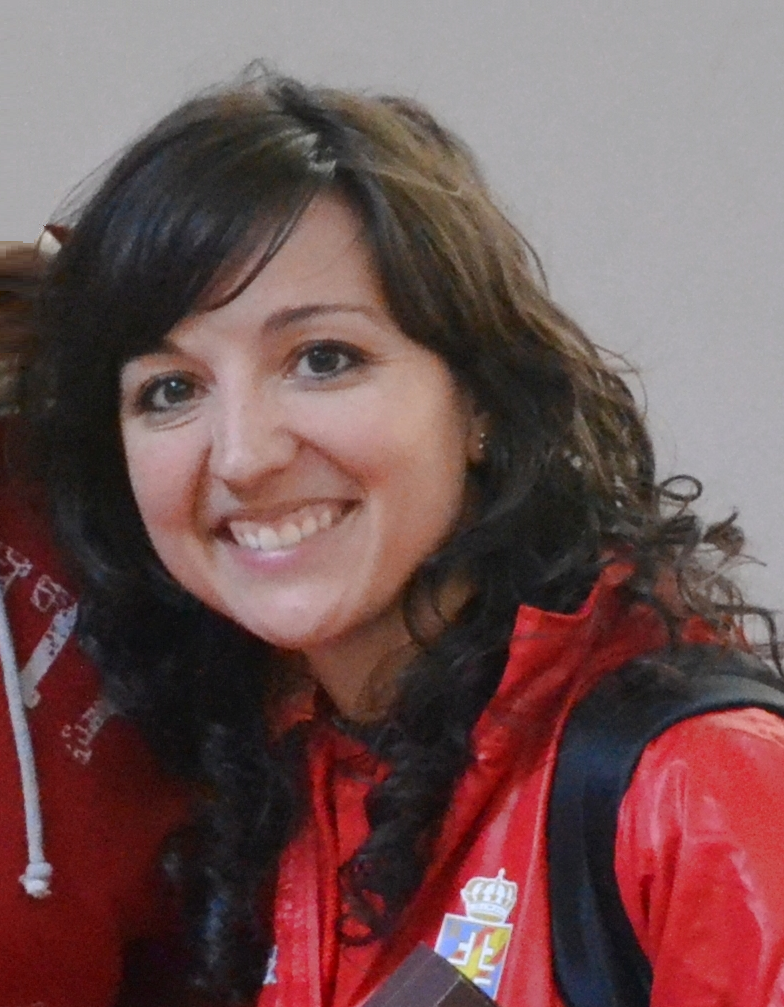

Personal information
- Full name: Sara Bayón Martínez
- Born: 19 May 1981 (age 45) Palencia, Spain

Gymnastics career
- Discipline: Rhythmic gymnastics
- Country represented: Spain; (1997–1999)
- Club: Club Gimnasia Rítmica Palencia
- Head coaches: María Fernández Ostolaza, Nancy Usero
- Retired: yes
Medal record
Rhythmic Gymnastics
Representing Spain
World Championships
Silver medal – second place	Seville 1998	All-Around
Gold medal – first place	Seville 1998	3 Ribbons + 2 Hoops
European Championships
Silver medal – second place	1997 Patras	5 Balls
Bronze medal – third place	1997 Patras	3 Balls + 2 Ribbons
Silver medal – second place	1999 Patras	3 Ribbons + 2 Hoops

Sara Bayón (born 19 May 1981) is a Spanish former rhythmic gymnast, former team coach of the Spanish national rhythmic gymnastics group, and current coach of the French group. She is the only Spanish gymnast who has been world champion as an athlete and as a coach, being world champion in 3 ribbons and 2 hoops in Seville 1998, and as a coach, in 10 clubs in Kyiv 2013 and Izmir 2014.

As coach of the Spanish group, she has also participated in three Olympic Games (Beijing 2008, London 2012 and Rio 2016), always together with Anna Baranova, her greatest achievement as coach being the silver medal at the Rio 2016 Olympic Games. During this period the group was known as the "Equipaso". At the start of her gymnastics' career, she was also individual national runner-up in the pre-junior category (1993) and runner-up in as a junior (1996), and in group mode she was a Spanish junior (1994) and youth champion (1995 and 1996) with the Club Gimnasia Rítmica Palencia.

== Career ==
Bayón started gymnastics at the age of 5 at the Colegio de las Dominicas de Palencia as part of the extracurricular activities. Later she enrolled to the Club Gimnasia Ritmica Palencia. She was the silver medalist in the pre-junior category at the Spanish Championship in Valladolid in 1993, 6th in the junior category at nationals in Guadalajara and junior national group champion in 1994, as well as in the youth category in 1995, runner-up in the youth category as an individual and national youth group champion in 1996. Some of her coaches were Rosario Andrés, Gloria Fernández, Mónica Pérez or the former national gymnast Silvia Yustos. On January 11, 1997, she entered the national rhythmic gymnastics group of Spain.

=== Senior ===
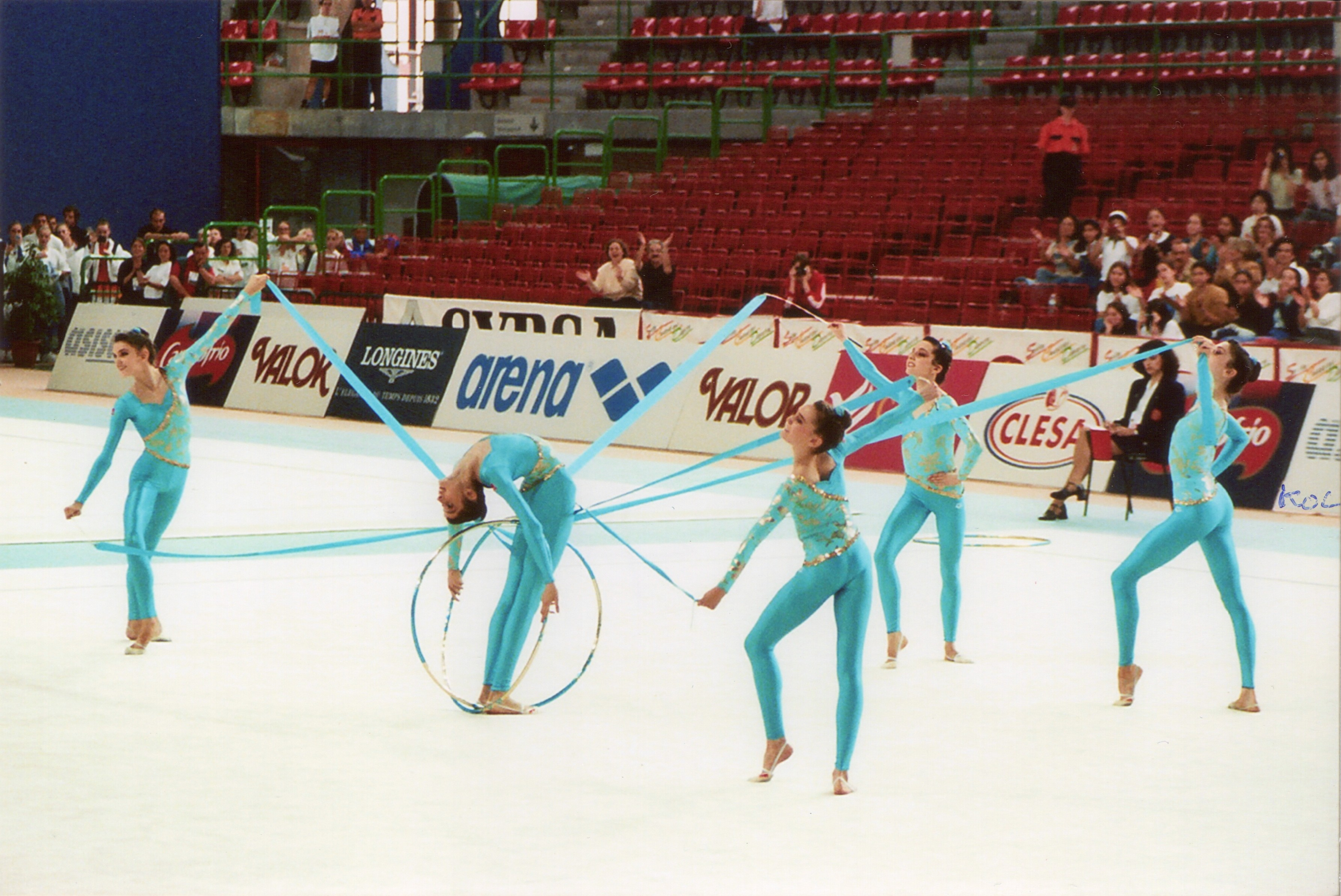

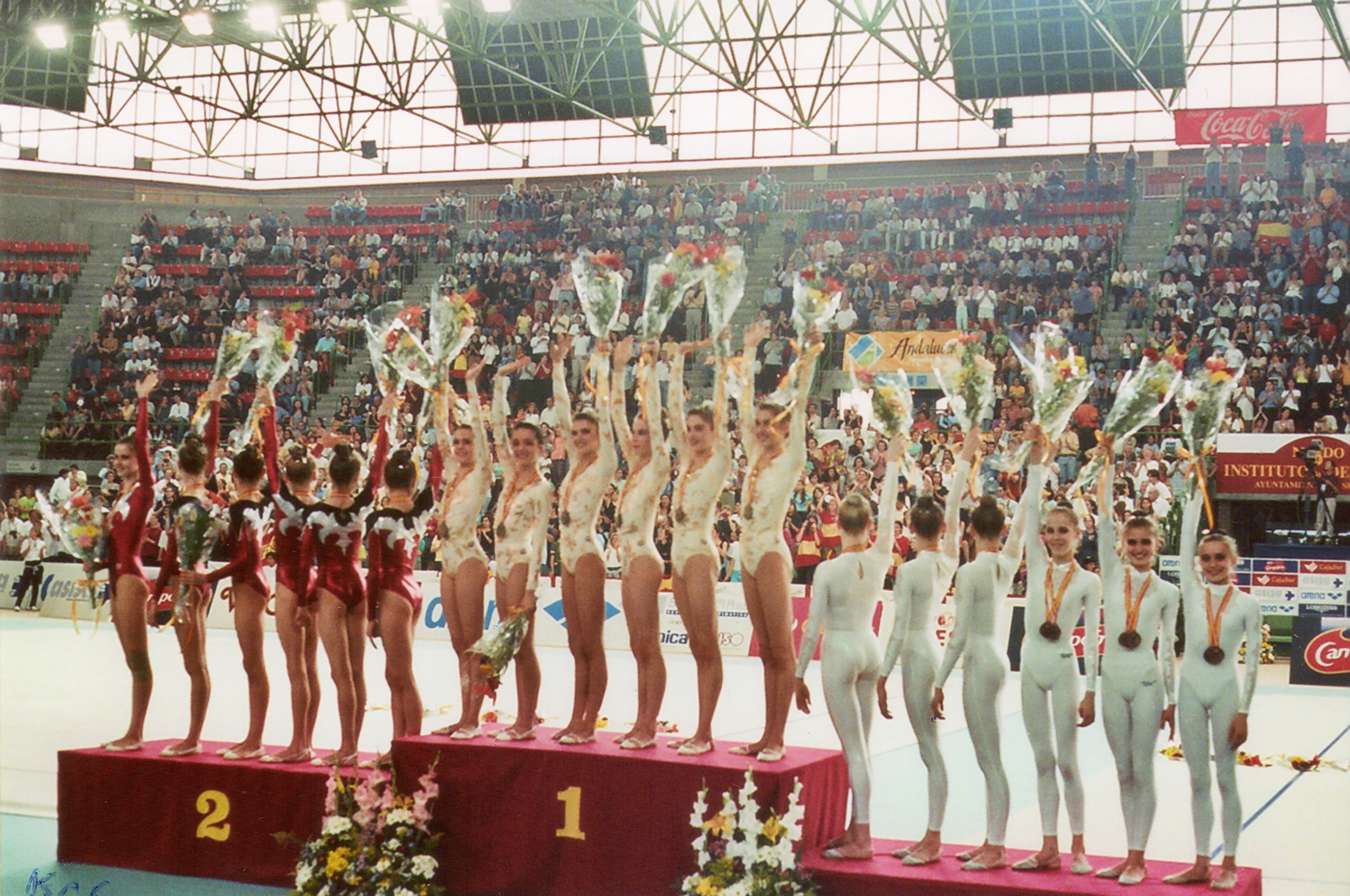
Above: End of the exercise of 3 ribbons and 2 hoops at the World Championships in 1998. Below: The team with the gold on the podium, being crowned world champions.

By 1997, the members of the team had already moved their residence from the Canillejas chalet to a building attached to the INEF and had begun training at the High Performance Center in Madrid. María Fernández was the new national coach since December 1996, after the departure of Emilia Boneva, who had undergone heart surgery in November. At the beginning of the year, in addition to Bayón, Marta Calamonte and Carolina Malchair joined the group. In April, after the withdrawal of Marta Baldó, Estela Giménez and Estíbaliz Martínez, and Marta Calamonte's injury, Esther Domínguez also joined. Bayón that year was a substitute in the 5 balls routine and starter in the one of 3 balls and 2 ribbons. The first used a medley of songs by Édith Piaf, such as "Non, je ne regrette rien" or "Hymne à l'amour", while the one with balls and ribbons used "Las cosas del Quiero", composed by Quintero, Leon and Quiroga.

After some tournaments such as the Ciudad de Ibiza or the Gran Trofeo Campofrío, Bayón participated in her first official major competition, the European Championship held in Patras, where she got 4th place in the All-Around, as well as a silver medal with 5 balls, and another bronze with 3 balls and 2 ribbons. The group was then made up of Bayón, Nuria Cabanillas, Esther Domínguez, Lorena Guréndez, Tania Lamarca, Carolina Malchair and Marta Calamonte as a substitute. Later she would obtain the gold medal at the Epson Cup in Tokyo.

In 1998 the two routine used the Sevillian "Juego de luna y arena" (inspired by a poem by Lorca) and the tango "El vaivén" respectively, two songs by José Luis Barroso. Bayón continued to be a substitute gymnast with 5 balls, and a starter in the 3 ribbons and 2 hoops. In May 1998 she managed to become world champion at the World Championship in Seville with 3 ribbons and 2 hoops, where the group managed to beat Belarus with a score of 19,850. In addition, on the first day the team had obtained the silver medal in the All-Around with a cumulative score of 39,133. They ranked seventh in the 5 balls competition. The national team received the Longines Award for Elegance in this championship, a trophy that is usually awarded by the eponymous watch brand and the FIG during outstanding international gymnastics competitions. The group that year was made up of Bayón, Marta Calamonte, Lorena Guréndez, Carolina Malchair, Beatriz Nogales, Paula Orive and Nuria Cabanillas as a substitute.

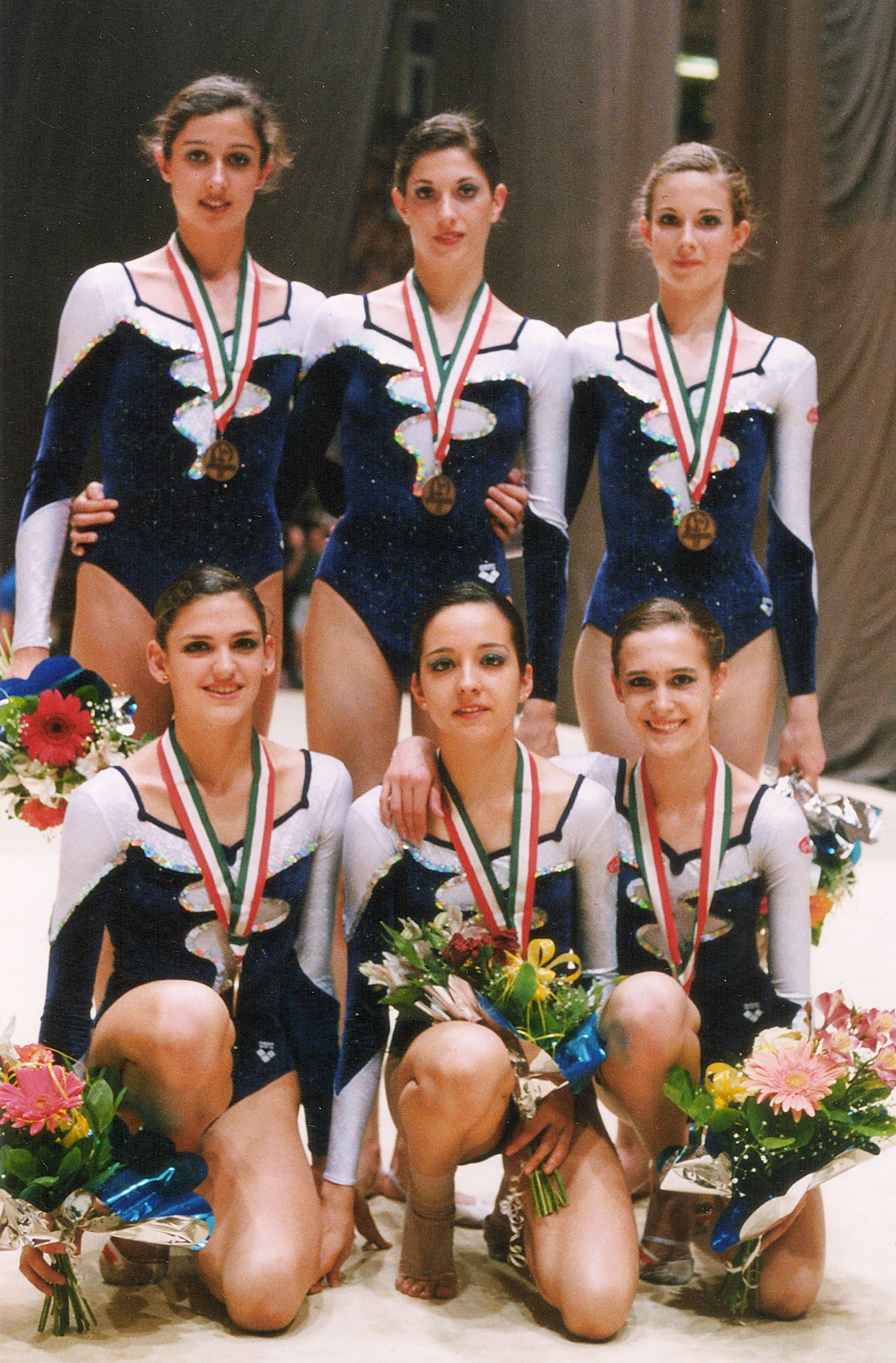
Bayón (below, center) with the bronze after the European Championships in Budapest 1999

By 1999 Nancy Usero was the group's new coach. She worked with Dalia Kutkaite as assistant and coach of the junior group, and with Cristina Álvarez as choreographer the first year. During that year, the two exercises were with 3 ribbons and 2 hoops and with 10 clubs, the first used "Zorongo gitano" and the other "Babelia" by Chano Domínguez, Hozan Yamamoto and Javier Paxariño, as music. Bayón would start in both exercises. The starting group was made up that year by Bayón, Marta Calamonte, Lorena Guréndez, Carolina Malchair, Beatriz Nogales and Paula Orive. At the end of May at the European Championship in Budapest the group was 7th in the All-Around, due to a poor score in the 10 club routine. In the competition of 3 ribbons and 2 hoops he won the bronze medal. In August the group won the silver medal in 3 ribbons and 2 hoops at the DTB-Pokal in Bochum. At the end of September at the World Championship in Osaka the group was 7th in the All-Around, and that gave them qualification for the Olympic Games in Sydney the following year. Subsequently, he ranked 6th in both the 3 ribbon and 2 hoops and the 10 clubs finals.

However, Bayón was unable to compete in the Olympic Games since the coach Nancy Usero decided to remove her and her teammates Paula Orive, Marta Alvés and Ana del Toro. Bayón retired in November 1999.

=== As a trainer ===
==== 2004–2008: Beijing Olympic cycle 2008 ====
After her retirement, Bayón studied INEF, specializing in high performance and doing internships at the CAR in Madrid. In 2005, after graduating, she was chosen as coach of the Spanish group, which she would direct together with the coach Anna Baranova. That same year, at the World Championship in Baku, the Spanish group obtained 7th place in the All-Around and 6th in 3 hoops and 4 clubs. The group was formed that year by Bárbara González Oteiza, Lara González, Marta Linares, Isabel Pagán, Ana María Pelaz and Nuria Velasco.

At the beginning of March 2006, the Spanish group won three silver medals at the Madeira International Tournament. In September 2006, at the World Cup event held in Portimão, the group achieved bronze in 5 ribbons and silver in 3 hoops + 4 clubs, in addition to 5th place in the All-Around. That same month, at the European Championships in Moscow they ended up in 5th place in the All-Around and 5th place in the 5 ribbons final. In November the Spaniards participated in the World Cup Final in Mie, where they got 5th place with 5 ribbons and 8th with 3 hoops + 4 clubs. The team composition was practically the same as the previous year but with Violeta González replacing Marta Linares.

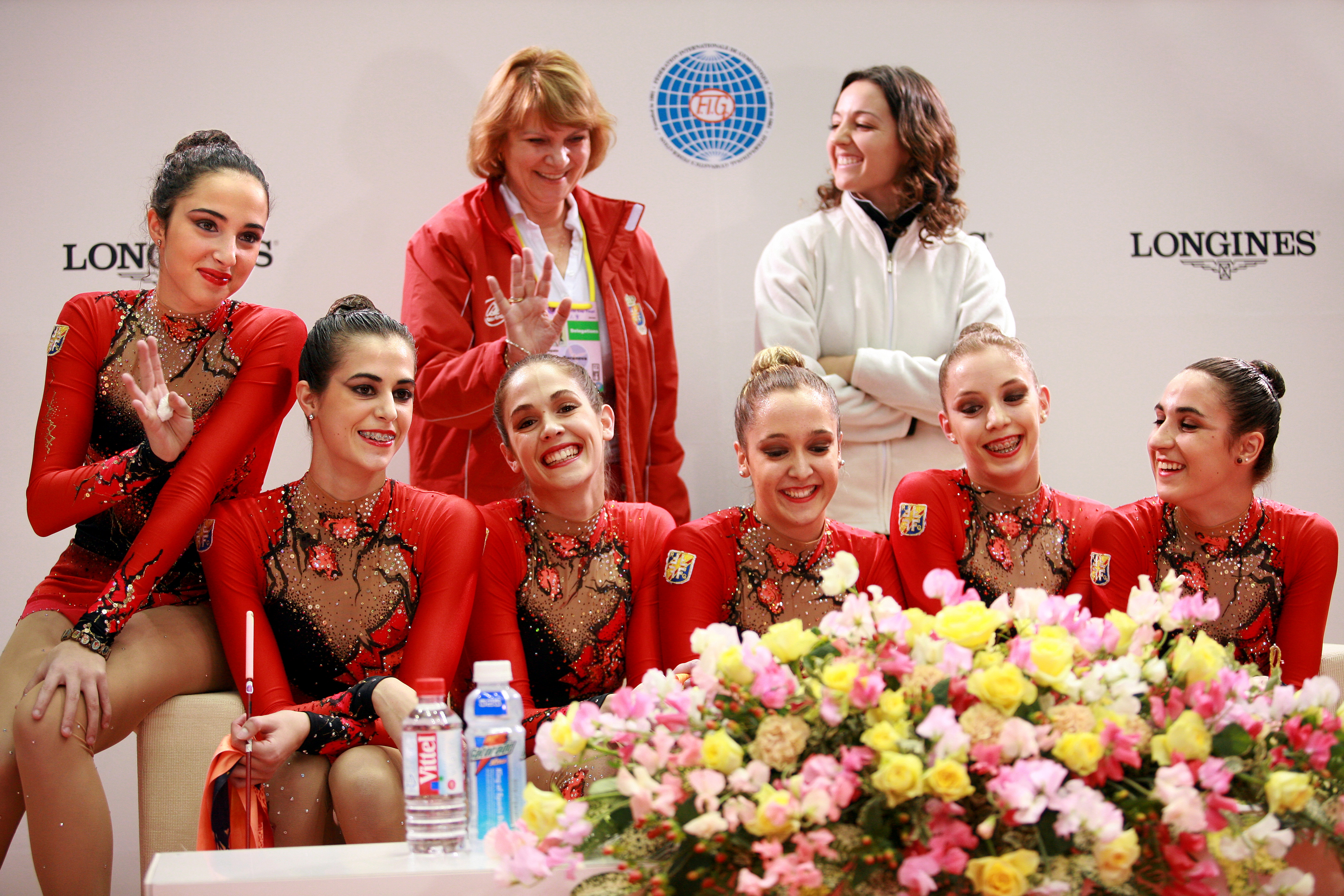
Sara Bayón (standing on the right) with the Spanish team in the World Cup Final in Mie (2006)

In April 2007, at the World Cup held in Portimão, the team was 5th place in the All-Around and 6th in both the 5 ribbons and the 3 hoops + 4 clubs finals. In May the Spanish group won the silver medal both in the All-Around and in the 3 hoops + 4 clubs final of the World Cup held in Nizhny Novgorod, in addition to the 4th place with 5 ribbons. In September of that same year they took part in the Patras World Championship. The team placed 5th in the All-Around, which qualified them for the 2008 Summer Olympics. They also finished 6th with both 5 ribbons and 3 hoops + 4 clubs. In December they competed in the Pre-Olympic in Beijing, obtaining All-Around 8th place. The team was made of Bárbara González Oteiza, Lara González, Isabel Pagán, Ana María Pelaz, Verónica Ruiz and Bet Salom.

For this time, in addition to the holder, in the preparation for the Olympics other gymnasts (then substitutes) such as Sandra Aguilar, Cristina Dassaeva, Sara Garvín, Violeta González and Lidia Redondo were integrated in the team. In June 2008 at the European Championship in Turin, the group finished in 6th place in the All-Around and 4th place in both 5 ribbons and 3 rhoops + 4 clubs. In August of that year they participated in the Olympic Games in Beijing, obtaining the 11th position in the qualifying phase after committing several errors in their second routines, 3 hoops and 4 clubs. This made the team unable to get into the Olympic final. That year, at the World Cup in Benidorm, the Spanish team won two silver medals in the 5 ribbon and the 3 hoops and 4 clubs competition. The group was then composed by the same gymnasts who went to Beijing: Bárbara González Oteiza, Lara González, Isabel Pagán, Ana María Pelaz, Verónica Ruiz and Bet Salom.

In October, after the 2008 Summer Olympics, Bulgaria's Efrossina Angelova became the new national coach, replacing Anna Baranova, and went on to coach the group alongside Bayón.

For 2009 the group was almost completely renewed, of the gymnasts who had been in Beijing 2008 the only one that was still in training was Ana María Pelaz. Some gymnasts such as Bet Salom decided to leave the selection due to Angelova's decision to increase the number of hours of training, which made them incompatible with their studies. In April, the Spanish team won two silver medals (in the general competition and in 3 ribbons and 2 ropes) in the World Cup event held in Portimão, in addition to 6th place in 5 hoops. In In May 2009, Bayón stopped training the rhythmic gymnastics team due to differences with Efrossina Angelova and became ballet and choreography teacher for the women's artistic gymnastics team, in addition to training the Arganda Rhythmic Gymnastics Club in Arganda del Rey.

==== 2011–2012: return to the national team and London 2012 ====
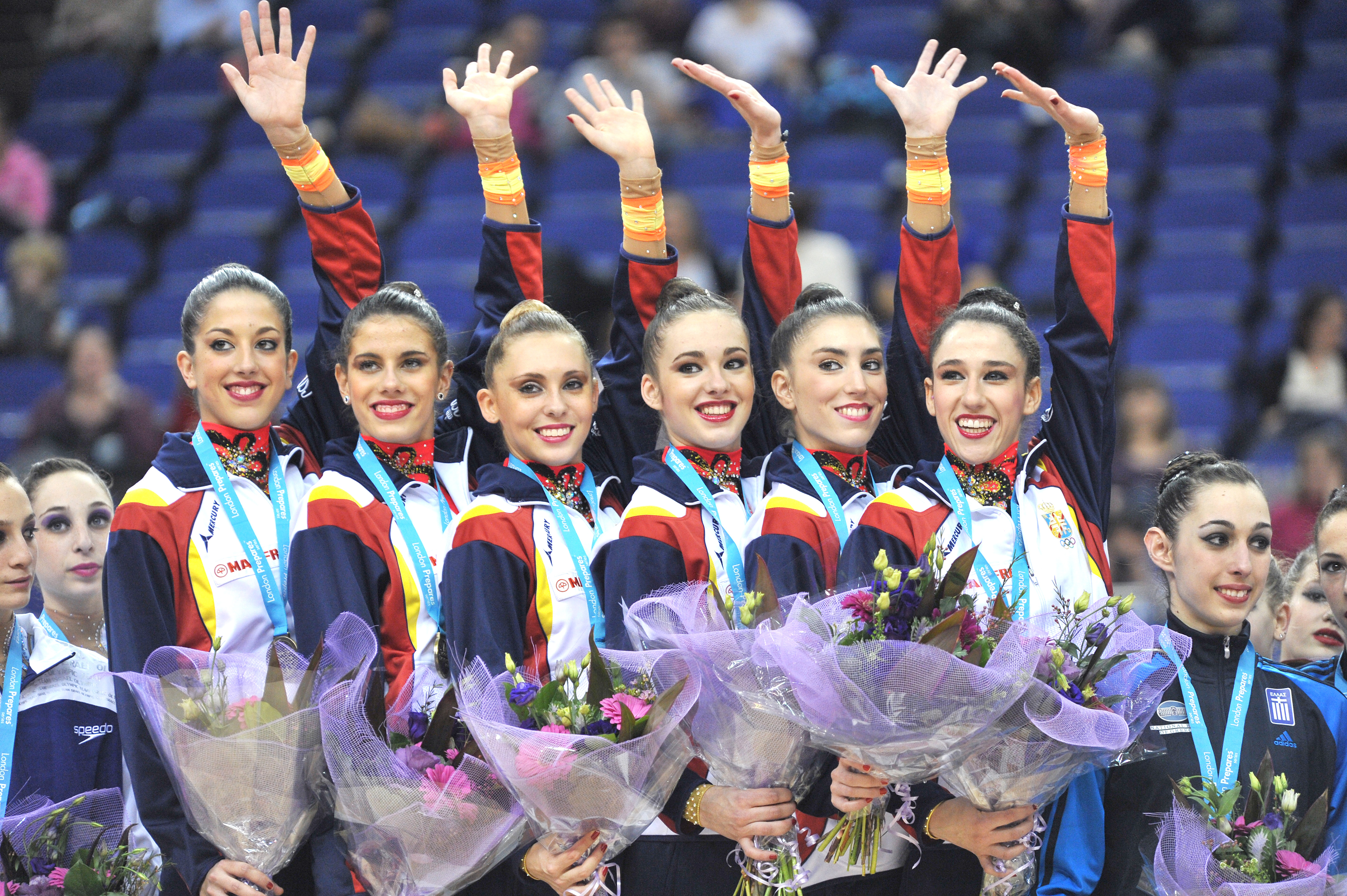
The Spanish team, coached by Anna Baranova and Sara Bayón, on the podium of the Pre-Olympic in London (2012)

In January 2011 dhe returned as coach of the national group, training it again with the coach Anna Baranova. At that time the group was three months behind the others, the time interval between the dismissal of Efrossina Angelova (who sued the Federation for unfair dismissal) and the hiring of Anna Baranova. Some gymnasts returned to their clubs of origin during this period, although several continued to work on body and apparatus technique with Noelia Fernández waiting for a new coach. With the return of Baranova and Bayón, two new routines were made with the aim of qualifying via that year's World Cup circuit for the London 2012 Olympic Games. The new 5 balls composition was on "Red Violin" by Ikuko Kawai (a theme based on the adage of the Concierto de Aranjuez), while the 3 ribbons 2 hoops used Malagueña by Ernesto Lecuona in Stanley Black And His Orchestra and Plácido Domingo's version. During the 2011 season, the group trained by Baranova and Bayón, and formed by Loreto Achaerandio, Sandra Aguilar, Elena López, Lourdes Mohedano, Alejandra Quereda (captain) and Lidia Redondo, qualified for several finals in World Cup stages, in addition to winning the 3 gold medals at both the US Classics Competition in Orlando and the II Meeting in Vitória Brazil. At the World Championships in Montpellier, France, they didn't qualify directly for the Olympics, as they obtained the 12th position and a place for the Pre-Olympic after a ribbon knot in their 3 ribbons + 2 hoops routine. They also achieved 6th place in the 5 balls final. After the World Championship they continued their training with the aim of finally qualifying for the Games in the pre-Olympic test event. In November they participated in the Euskalgym and in December, in the I International Tournament of Zaragoza, they won the silver medal behind the Russian group.

In January 2012 they participated in the Pre-Olympic event, where they won the gold medal and qualified for the Olympic Games. Spain won a major competition for the first time since Seville 1998 (in which the Spanish group won gold in the 3 ribbons + 2 hoops final). In May, the team won All-Around bronze at the Sofia's World Cup and the gold medal in the final of the mixed routines of ribbons and hoops. In July 2012 the team won the bronze medal in the All-Around of the World Cup event held in Minsk.

Subsequently, Bayón traveled with the team to the London 2012 Olympic Games, her second Olympic experience as a coach of the Spanish group, having also coached the team in Beijing. In the qualifying phase, the Spanish team, composed of Loreto Achaerandio, Sandra Aguilar, Elena López, Lourdes Mohedano, Alejandra Quereda (captain) and Lidia Redondo, finished with 54,550 points (27,150 for 5 balls and 27,400 for 3 ribbons + 2 hoops) who placed them 5th in the All-Around and qualified them for the final. In the Olympic final held at the Wembley Arena, the group first performed with 5 balls that gave them a score of 27,400 points, placing them in 5th position and improving by 0.250 from qualification. In the 3 ribbons + 2 hoops routine they scored 27,550 points, an inquiry for the difficulty score (which was 9,200) was issued, although it was rejected. The two routines gave them a total of 54,950 points, which served to finish the competition in 4th position and obtain the Olympic diploma.

=== 2013–2016: Rio 2016 Olympic cycle ===
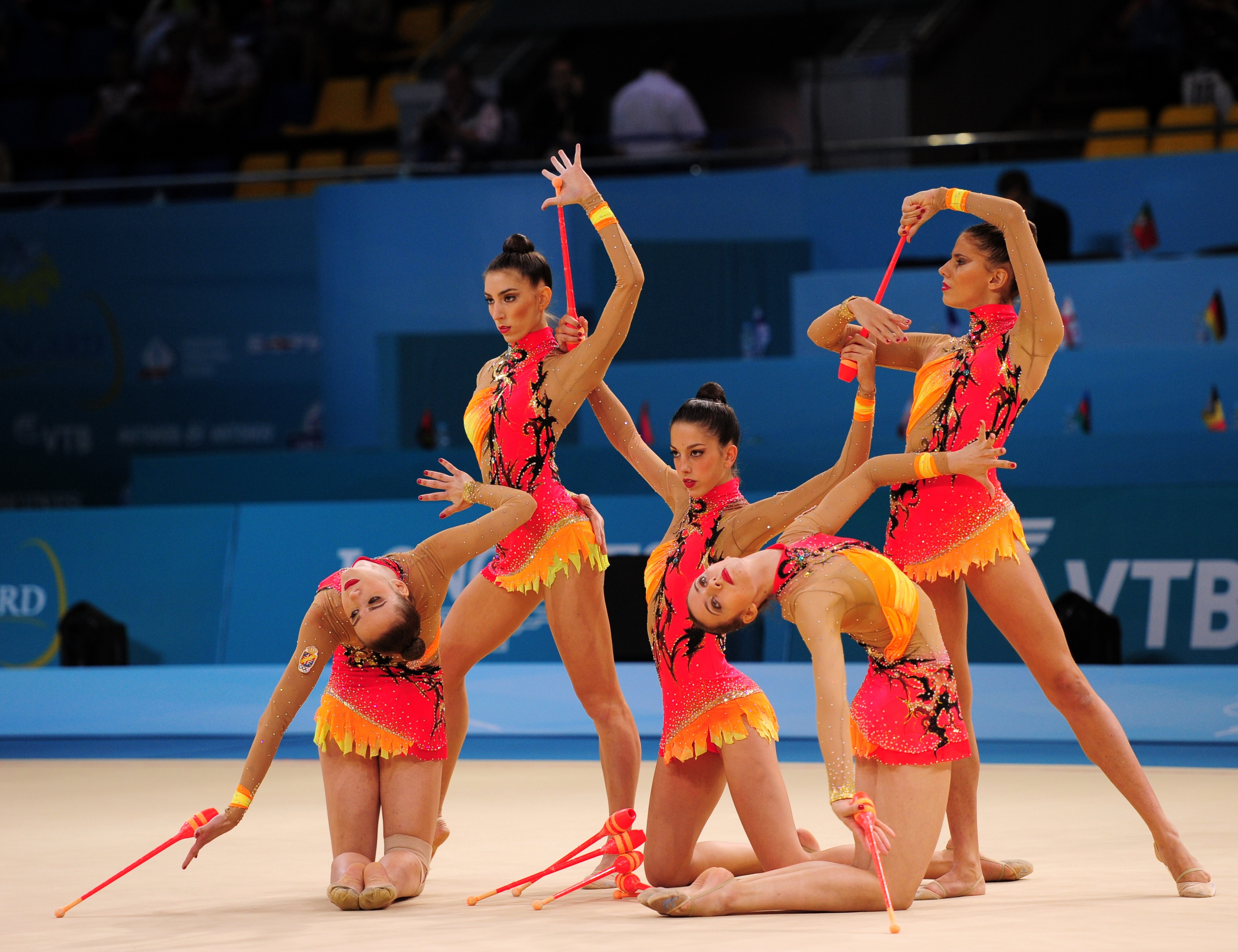
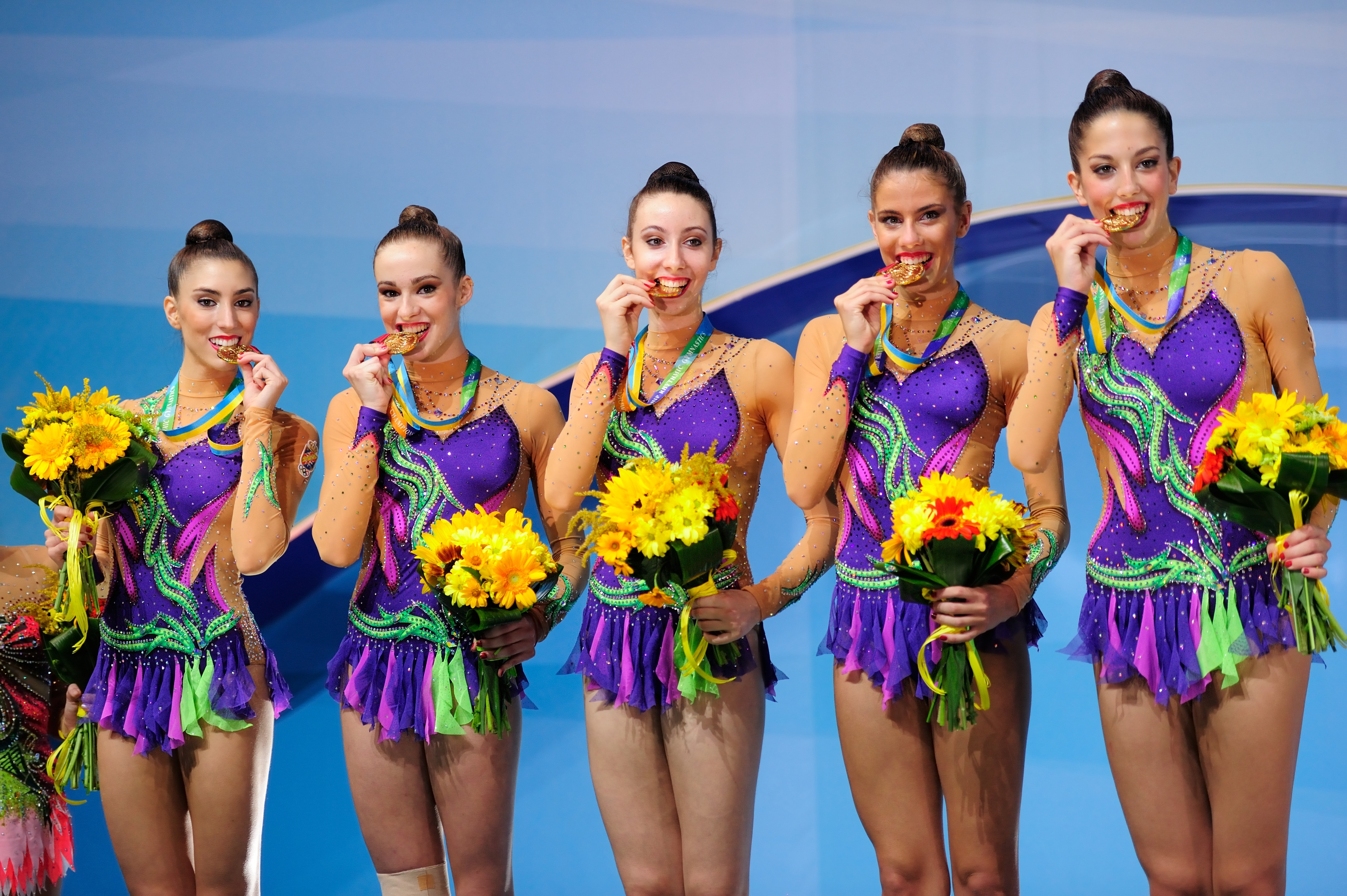

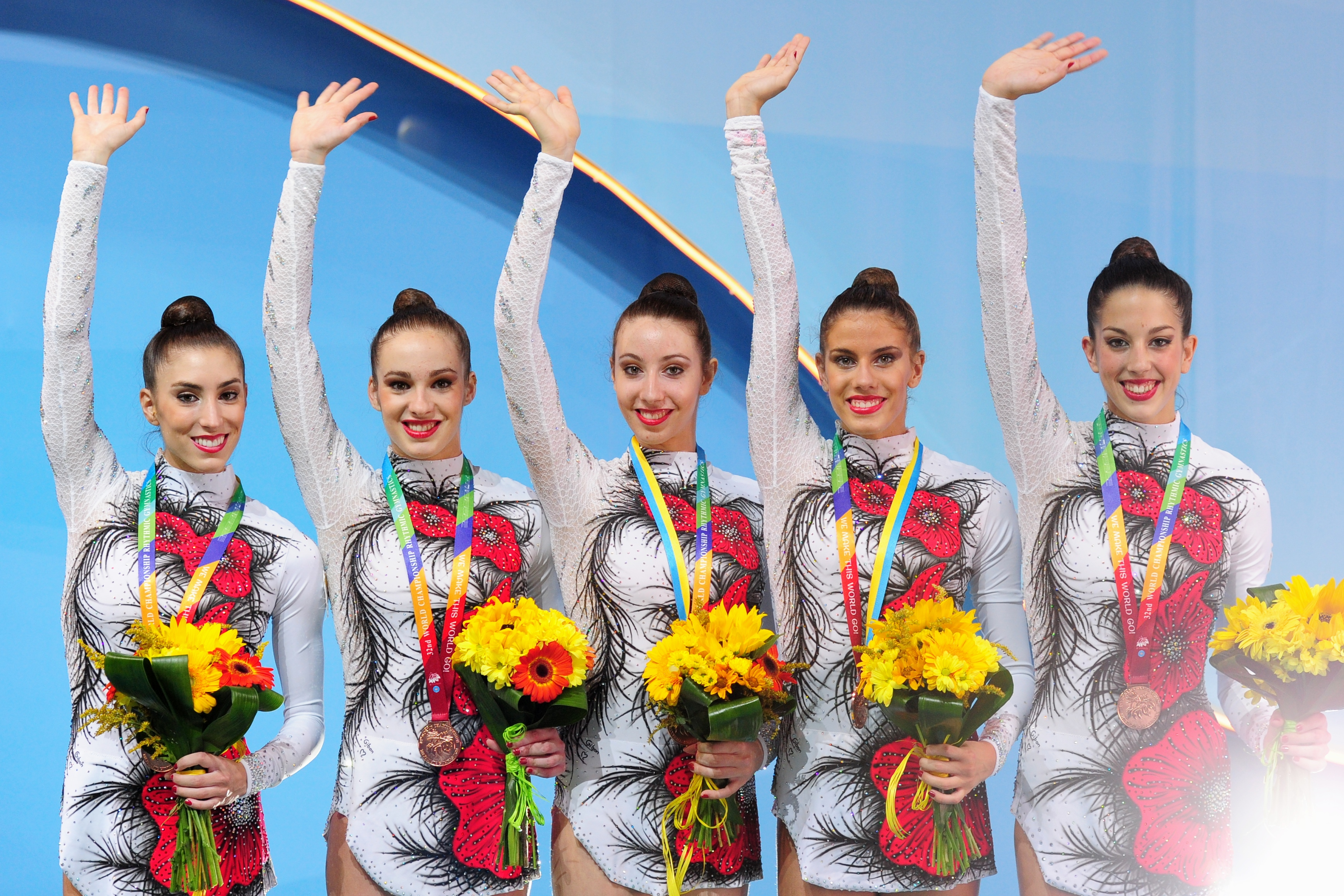
Above: Start of the routine of 10 clubs at the 2013 World Championships. Center: The Spanish team with 10 clubs' gold in Kyiv. Bottom: The team with 3 balls + 2 ribbons' bronze.

==== 2013: first world title as coach in Kiev ====
In 2013 the 10 clubs was on "Blind" by Miguel Poveda, and the 3 balls and 2 ribbons on a mix of "Still", "Big Palooka" and "Jive and Jump" by The Jive Aces. The new members of the group this year were Artemi Gavezou and Marina Fernández (who would retire in August 2013). In April of that year, at the World Cup in Lisbon, they won All-Around gold and bronze with 3 balls and 2 ribbons. Subsequently, they won the silver medal with 10 clubs at the Sofia World Cup and bronze in the All-Around at the Saint Petersburg World Cup.

On 1 September at the World Championship in Kyiv, after being 4th in the All-Around the previous day, the Spanish group won gold with 10 clubs and bronze with 3 balls + 2 ribbons. The clubs' score was 17,350, which gave them the world title ahead of Italy and Ukraine, second and third respectively, while in the mixed final, the score of 17,166 was not enough to oust Belarus, that it was silver, and to Russia, that won gold. The group consisted of Sandra Aguilar, Artemi Gavezou, Elena López, Lourdes Mohedano and Alejandra Quereda. These were the first medals won by Spain in a World Rhythmic Gymnastics Championship since 1998.

After being proclaimed world champions, the gymnasts of the Spanish group made a tour where they participated in several exhibitions, such as those held at the Arnold Classic Europe in Madrid, the Solidarity Gala in favour of the Man Project in Burgos, the Gala of Gymnastics Stars in Mexico, D. F., the Euskalgym in Bilbao, in Lyon, in Conil de la Frontera, in Granada during the Spanish Group Championship, and in Vitoria for the Christmas Gala of the Federation Alavesa of Gymnastics. In addition, they made a calendar whose purpose was to raise money to pay for the next competitions. In 2014, the captain of the group, Alejandra Quereda, asked about the fact that no Spanish television channel broadcast the World Championship in Kiev and about the lack of media at the airport when returning to Spain, replied:

«It shocks you a little the fact that media from other countries support you more than yours [...] After the World Championship we have been invited to make exhibitions in other countries [...] the best was to arrive in Mexico. At the airport we were waiting for the press, televisions, radios... a deployment. And, of course, you think "if we are more famous here than in our country"».

— Alejandra Quereda, 2014 statements to Olympic Planet

==== 2014: European bronze in Baku and second world title in Izmir ====
Several injuries and physical problems of some members of the team, such as Elena Lopez’s knee pain or a bone edema in the left ankle of Lourdes Mohedano, delayed the start of the 2014 season. On March 29, 2014, the group participated in an exhibition in Vera, where they premiered the new 3 balls + 2 balls routine on "Intro" and "Mascara" by Violet, in addition to 10 clubs, which had some modifications compared to the previous year. The following week, the same five group members who had been world champions in Kyiv travelled to Lisbon to compete in the World Cup, their first official competition of the season. In Lisbon they won the gold medal in the All-Around, while they won silver in the two apparatus finals. In the last competition before the European Championship, the Minsk World Cup, the girls won All-Around silver, bronze in the final of 3 balls + 2 ribbons, in addition to a 4th place in the final 10 clubs.

In June at the European Championship in Baku, they got the 5th place in the All-Around and then won bronze in the 10 clubs final. The score of 17,550 placed them behind Russia, silver, and Bulgaria, that won gold. In addition they got the 5th place in the final of 3 balls + 2 ribbons. This medal was the first achieved by Spain in a European Rhythmic Gymnastics Championship since 1999. Two days after the Europeans, on June 17, a reception was held for the national team in the CSD to celebrate this achievement. The president of the Royal Spanish Federation of Gymnastics, Jesus Carballo, described the Spanish group as "one of the best teams we have had" and highlighted the value of the medal to be achieved before "countries with much more history and many more resources to be able to take the podiums". Alejandra Quereda, the team captain, pointed out that «"t is a sample of the great moment of form in which we are".

In August a World Cup was held in Sofia, where the Spanish group was 4th in the All-Around, just 0.5 short of bronze, thus falling behind Italy, Bulgaria and Russia that took gold. The next day, they won the bronze medal in the 10 clubs final and 5th place (tied with Ukraine and Belarus) in the 3 balls 2 ribbons final. For this competition Artemi Gavezou, who was recovering from an injury and could not travel, was replaced by Adelina Fominykh in the clubs routine and by Marina Viejo in the mixed one, making it the debut of both with the starting group. That same month, again with Artemi as holder, they participated in the IV Meeting in Vitória, where they achieved silver in the All-Around and in 3 balls + 2 ribbons, and the gold medal in the 10 clubs final. At the beginning of September at the World Cup event in Kazan, the members of the Spanish team took bronze in the All-Around, the 4th place in the 3 balls and 2 ribbons final, and the 8th place with 10 clubs.

At the World Championships in Izmir, several drops and an out of borders in the 3 balls + 2 ribbons routine, made the Spanish group finish in 11th place in the All-Around, managing to qualify only for the 10 clubs final. The following day, on 28 September, the Spanish team managed to win the gold medal in the 10 clubs final for the second consecutive year. The score was 17,433, which gave the Spanish the world title ahead of Israel and Belarus, second and third respectively. The team was made up of the same members who also won the gold medal in Kyiv the previous year: Sandra Aguilar, Artemi Gavezou, Elena López, Lourdes Mohedano and Alejandra Quereda.

After being proclaimed world champions for the second time, in October the team traveled to the LG Whisen Rhythmic All Stars 2014, held in Seoul, South Korea, where they performed the mixed exercise and participated in an exhibition. On December 20, 2014, a tribute was held in honor of Sara Bayón at the Marta Domínguez Pavilion in Palencia. Participating in the recognition, among others, were both the senior and junior Spanish groups, as well as various rhythmic and artistic gymnastics clubs from Palencia. During it, several audiovisual montages were also shown that recalled some of Sara's achievements, as well as other outstanding gymnasts and trainers from Palencia, as well as congratulations and praise from various personalities such as David DeMaría, José Antonio Camacho or Almudena Cid.

==== 2015: World bronze in Stuttgart and further recognition ====
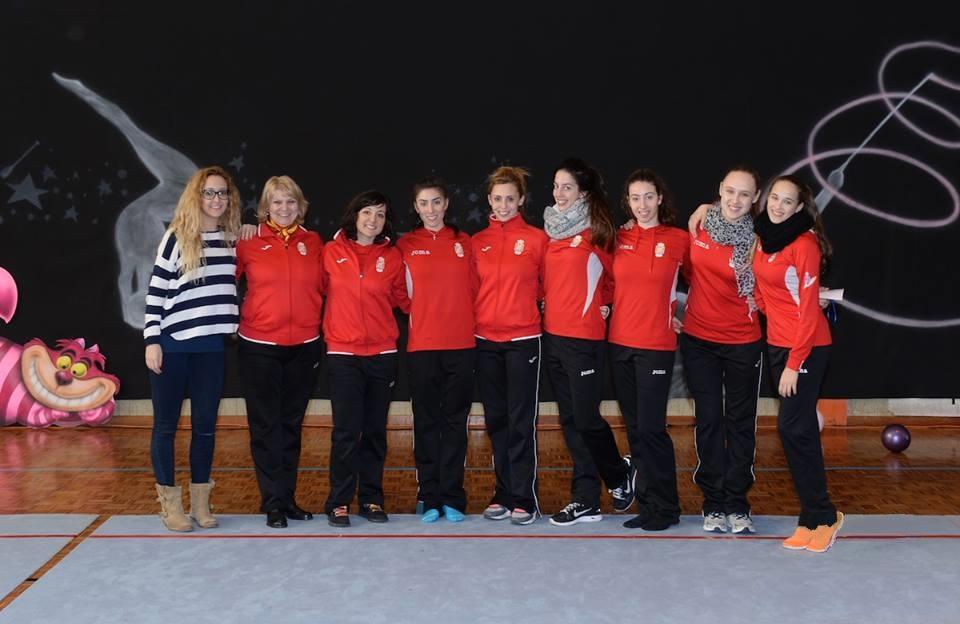
Bayón (third) with part of the Spanish group in a master class in Luarca in 2015

At the beginning of March 2015, Bayón taught with part of the group a master class in Luarca, Asturias. That same month the group had the first competition of the season, the Grand Prix de Thiais, where the team premiered the two new routines, the 5 ribbons on "Europa" by Mónica Naranjo and the 2 hoops + 6 clubs on a remix of District 78 of the song "Ameksa (The Shepard)" by Taalbi Brothers. Claudia Heredia and Lidia Redondo, who had returned to the selection substituted the injured Elena López and Lourdes Mohedano. The group finished in 6th place in the All-Around, while they won the silver medal in the 5 ribbons final and 8th place in the 2 hoops + 6 clubs. That same month, the Spanish team travelled to Lisbon to compete in the World Cup event held in the Portuguese capital. In the same, they achieved the bronze medal in the All-Around, the 7th place in the 5 ribbons final and again the bronze in the 2 hoops + 6 clubs. In April, the team participated at the World Cup in Pesaro, obtaining the bronze medal in the All-Around, 7th place with 5 ribbons and 5th in 2 hoops + 6 clubs. At the beginning of May, the team participated in two exhibitions at the Spanish Championship in School Age, held in Ávila, and at the International Tournament of Corbeil-Essonnes, France. In late May the team travelled to Tashkent to participate in the World Cup held in the Uzbek capital, there they achieved two silver medals in the All-Around and in 2 hoops + 6 clubs, and finished in 6th position with 5 ribbons. In June, the group participated in the European Games in Baku, ending in 4th place in both the All-Around and the 5 ribbons final. That same month, at the World Cup in Kazan, they achieved the 6th position in the All-Around and the 5th place in both the event finals.

On August 29, 2015, Bayón was the herald of the Fairs and Festivals of San Antolín in Palencia. In September 2015, the Stuttgart World Championship also served as a first qualifier for the Olympic Games. On the first day of competition, 12 September, the Spanish team won the bronze medal in the All-Around competition with a total score of 34,900, only surpassed by Russia and Bulgaria, gold and silver respectively. It was the first world All-Around medal for Spain since 1998. This position gave the Spanish group a direct quota for the Olympic Games in Rio de Janeiro. On the last day of competition, the Spanish obtained the 6th place in the 5 ribbons final. During this routine, Artemi Gavezou injured her foot. The team then decided not to participate in the final with 2 hoops + 6 clubs, since in addition to that Lidia Redondo, the reserve gymnast, could not compete because she was not enrolled at that time. The group's rooster was made by Sandra Aguilar, Artemi Gavezou, Elena López, Lourdes Mohedano and Alejandra Quereda, in addition to Lidia Redondo as an alternate. This championship was broadcast in Spain by Teledeporte with the narration of Paloma del Río and Almudena Cid, being the first World Championship to be broadcast on a Spanish television in that Olympic cycle, since the two previous ones were not transmitted by any national channel.

After this bronze medal, the Spanish team had two receptions in the Superior Sports Council and the Spanish Olympic Committee, in addition to giving numerous interviews to different media, participating for example in the radio program Olympic Planet of Radio Marca or in the television program El hormiguero of Antena 3 on September 24. On November 17, Bayón attended along with Anna Baranova, Mónica Hontoria, Dagmara Brown and the Spanish ensemble, the National Sports Awards, where they were awarded the Baron de Güell Cup as the best national team of 2014, prize that the Superior Sports Council had been awarded them on 13 July and that was shared with the women's football team. The prize was picked up by Alejandra Quereda, captain of the team, and by Jesús Carballo Martínez, president of the Federation, from the hands of King Felipe VI of Spain.

On October 19, 2015, it was announced that the Spanish group would star in the traditional Christmas announcement of the brand Freixenet, and that this would be directed by filmmaker Kike Maíllo. and was recorded between 10 and 11 November on a set in Barcelona. The announcement, entitled "Brillar", premiered on November 25 at an event at the Maritime Museum of Barcelona, and can be seen from that day on the website of Freixenet and on YouTube. He was accompanied by the recording of a promotional documentary called Mereciendo un sueño, where gymnasts and coaches tell their day to day on the national team.

==== 2016: European Holon and silver in the Rio Olympics ====
In February 2016, at the Espoo World Cup, the team premiered two new exercises for the season. The 5 ribbons music had a medley of themes with Brazilian airs: "Vidacarnaval" by Carlinhos Brown, "Bahiana/Batucada" by Inner Sense and Richard Sliwa, and "Sambuka" by Artem Uzunov. The 2 hoops + 6 clubs featured flamenco themes "Jewish Cemetery", "Soleá" and "La aurora de Nueva York", played by the Company Rafael Amargo and Montse Cortés. Rafael Amargo also collaborated with the ensemble in the choreography of the exercise. The team obtained bronze in the All-Around, gold with 5 ribbons and silver in the mixed event. At the beginning of March they achieved the three golds in the Schmiden International Tournament. That same month they traveled to the World Cup in Lisbon, where they won bronze in the All-Around, 5th place with 5 ribbons and another bronze in the 3 + 2 final. The following week they moved to France to compete in the Grand Prix of Thiais, which celebrated its 30th edition. There they got All-Around bronze, 4th place in 5 ribbons' final and silver in the 2 hoops + 6 clubs' one. In May, in the World Cup in Tashkent, they hung bronze with 5 ribbons and silver in the mixed final after having obtained 4th place in the All-Around.

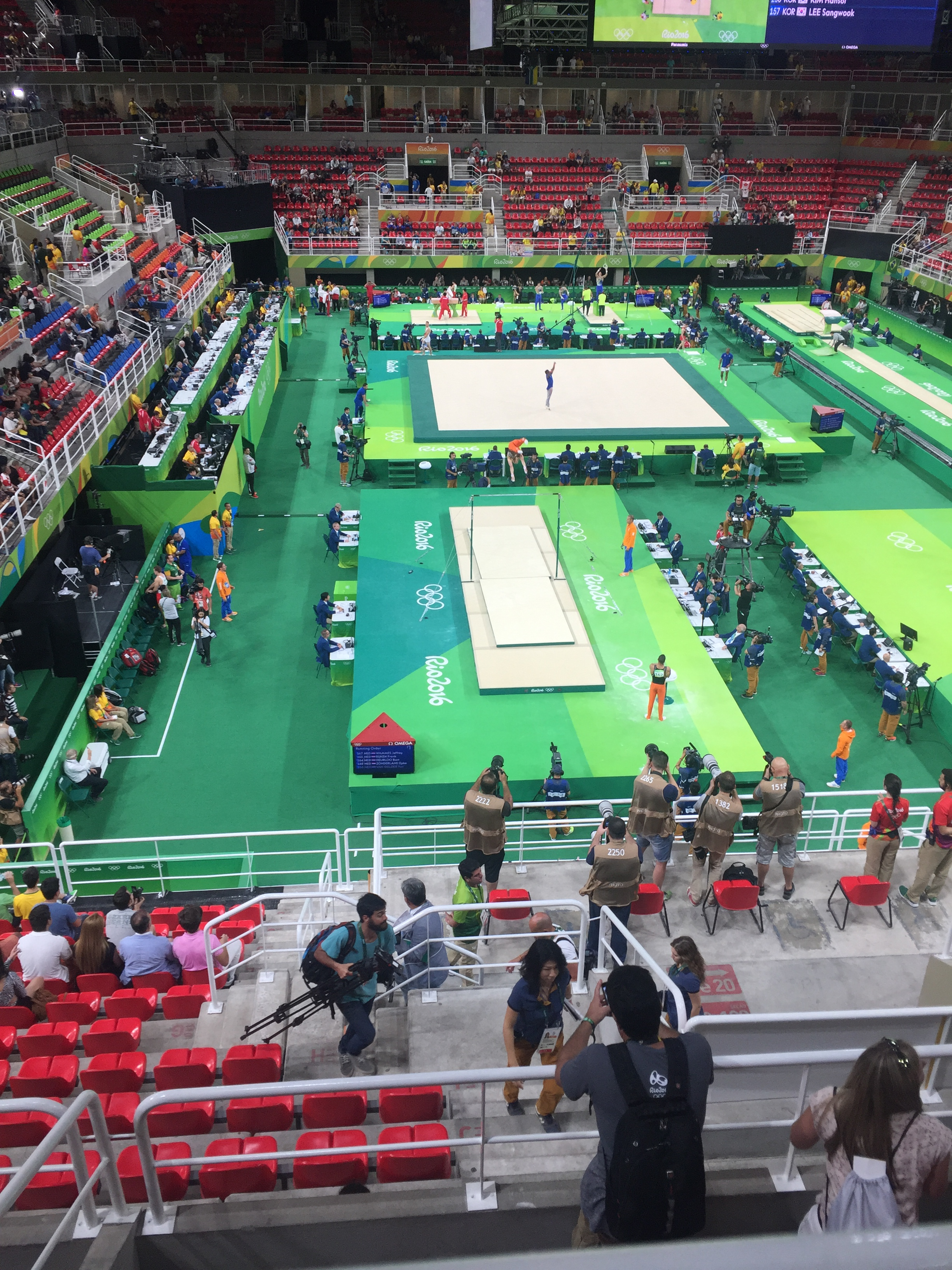
The Rio Olympic Arena hosted the rhythmic and artistic gymnastics competition of the 2016 Olympic Games.

In June, the Guadalajara World Cup was held, the first official international rhythmic gymnastics competition held in Spain since the World Cup Final in Benidorm (2008). The event took place from 3 to 5 June in the Multipurpose Palace of Guadalajara with the attendance of some 8,000 people in the last two days. The group managed to win the gold medal in the All-Around ahead of Belarus and Ukraine, while the last day hung two bronzes in the 5 ribbon and the 3 + 2 finals. That same month they participated in the European Championship in Holon, where they obtained the 6th place in the All-Around with a cumulative score of 35,333.81 In the apparatus finals, they won bronze with 5 ribbons with a score of 18,133, and silver in the mixed final with a score of 18,233.82 In July they competed in the Kazan World Cup, At the end of the same month they performed at the Baku World Cup, the last round before the Games, where they achieved the 5th place in the All-Around and two bronzes in the finals.

In August the group participated in the Olympic Games in Rio, being the third Olympic participation of Bayón as a coach. The national team was made by Sandra Aguilar, Artemi Gavezou, Elena López, Lourdes Mohedano and Alejandra Quereda. The competition took place the last two days of the Games at the Olympic Arena in Rio. On 20 August they ended qualifications in 1st place with a score of 35,749 (17,783 with 5 ribbon and 17,966 for 2 hoops + 6 clubs), thus qualifying for the final the following day. On 21 August, in the Olympic final, the Spanish group was placed first after they performed with 5 ribbons with a note of 17,800, in the second rotation, 2 hoops + 6 clubs, they obtained a score of 17.966, eventually finished second after Russia and ahead of Bulgaria, thus achieving the silver medal with a total score of 35,766. This medal was the first Olympic medal for Spanish rhythmic gymnastics since the one won by the Golden Girls in Atlanta 1996.

On August 29, the City Council of Palencia hosted a tribute to Bayón on the occasion of the Olympic silver in Rio 2016. During the same, Bayón signed in the Book of Honor of the city. After it was announced that Equipaso would star again in the Freixenet Christmas spot, it was presented on November 28 at a gala at the Goya Theatre in Barcelona. It featured the presentation of Almudena Cid and the presence of the team. The announcement, entitled "Shine 2016", was practically the same as the previous year with the exception of the final, which included new images of gymnasts wishing a happy new year with their Olympic silver medal. The campaign was accompanied by a promotional documentary called "La satisfacción es para siempre", with new images and statements from gymnasts about their preparation, and a recreation of the podium of the Rio Games. In 2017, Bayón, asked about the factors that led to the Olympic medal, replied:

Clearly the fourth position in London has served us well for Rio. Seeing you so close to a medal was an extra motivation to face the next Olympic cycle. And on top of that we started with two medals in the 2013 World Cup and that was already like a kick of energy and adrenaline [...] As Anna Baranova said at the time: "In London we kept the medal hanging and at some point it was going to fall

— Sara Bayón, speaking in 2017 to Rincon Olimpico

==== 2017 - 2020: Tokyo 2021 Olympic cycle ====
By 2017, the five holders of the 2016 team stopped competing to rest and focus on academics or other projects. As a result, substitute gymnasts joined the starting team, most of whom had been in the Spanish junior team between 2014 and 2016. On 25 March the new senior Spanish group debuted at the Thiais Grand Prix. In this competition the team was 8th overall and 4th in the final of 3 balls + 2 ropes. In April they competed in the Pesaro World Cup (18th place in the All-Around), the Tashkent World Cup (9th place in the All-Around and 6th place in the 3 balls + 2 ropes final), and the Baku World Cup (7th in the All-Around, 7th in the 5 hoops final and 5th in the 3 balls + 2 ropes final).

On 14 May the new group achieved their first official international medal, obtaining bronze in the 5 hoops final in the World Cup in Portimão. In the All-Around the team was 4th, the same position they achieved in the final of 3 balls + 2 ropes. The group was composed of Mónica Alonso, Victoria Cuadrillero, Clara Esquerdo, Ana Gayán, Lía Rovira and Sara Salarrullana. Since the Guadalajara World Cup the Spanish team was formed by Mónica Alonso, Victoria Cuadrillero, Clara Esquerdo, Ana Gayán, Alba Polo and Lía Rovira. In the All-Around they finished in 6th position and in the final of the mixed exercise of ropes and balls they were 8th. From 11 to 13 August they participated in the last World Cup before the World Championship, held in Kazan Russia. There, the team got the 5th position in the All-Around and the 8th position in both event finals. On 2 September, the team participated in the World Championship in Pesaro. In the mixed routine they scored 16,150, and 14,500 with 5 hoops after two apparatus drops, which placed them in 15th position in the All-Around and didn't make it to any apparatus final.

The results of the team at both the group and individual level were rated as scarce that year by numerous people such as former gymnast Almudena Cid, who said "It was many years ago, more than 40, that we did not enter top 24, not even in the 8 best" and pointed out that "the current structure of rhythmic in Spain is not ideal [...] we have to make a recruitment of small girls and think about taking care of them, and if that gymnast is not yet on the national team involve her where there is a follow-up behind [...] so that when she is [...] he does not have to start from scratch».

In March 2018 the team began the season at the City of Desio Trophy, disputing a bilateral match with Italy in which they won silver. An injury to Clara Esquerdo’s foot in mid-March meant that the team could not participate in the Grand Prix de Thiais. Later they competed at the Sofia World Cup finishing 10th in the All-Around. In mid-April, at the Pesaro World Cup, the team achieved the 6th position in the All-Around, the 8th with 5 hoops and the 7th in the mixed event, while in May, at the Guadalajara World Cup they were 10th in the All-Around and 6th in the 3 balls + 2 ropes final. In early June they participated in the European Championship in Guadalajara, the first European Championship held in Spain since 2002. They were 5th in the All-Around and 6th in both event finals. At the end of August the team competed in Minsk's World Cup, taking 6th overall position, 7th with 5 hoops and 6th in the 3+2. A week later, at the World Cup in Kazan, they took 10th place in the All-Around and 7th place with 5hoops. In mid-September the group competed at the World Championship in Sofia. Scoring 14,450 with 5 hoops after several drops of the apparatus, while in the mixed routine they scored 19,150, that placed them 20th in the All-Around. In the 3 balls + 2 ropes final they occupied 8th place with 19,800. The team was formed in this championship by Monica Alonso, Victoria Quadrillero, Clara Esquerdo, Ana Gayán, Alba Polo and Sara Salarrullana.

At the beginning of March 2019, the team began the season in the International Diputación de Málaga, achieving bronze. After an exhibition in Corbeil-Essonnes, they participated in the Grand Prix of Thiais, obtaining the 10th place in the All-Around and the 6th with 3 hoops and 4 clubs. In April they achieved 10th and 12th place in the All-Around at the Pesaro and Baku's World Cups respectively. In May, at the Guadalajara World Cup, they were 4th in the All-Around, 7th with 5 balls and 4th with 3 hoops + 4 clubs. After several preparatory competitions, in September they competed at the World Championship in Baku, finishing 17th and thus not achieving the Olympic qualification. The team was made by Victoria Quadrillero, Clara Esquerdo, Ana Gayán, Alba Polo, Emma Reyes and Sara Salarrullana.

==== Coaching the French group (2020–present) ====
After the Spanish Federation did not renew her contract, ending in August 2020, on December 3, 2020, Bayón was appointed as the new assistant coach for France's group, accompanied by Anna Baranova.
