= Marina Viejo =

Spanish rhythmic gymnast

- Full name: Marina Viejo Mañanes
- Born: 6 April 1996 (age 30) Madrid, Spain

Gymnastics career
- Discipline: Rhythmic gymnastics
- Country represented: Spain (2011-2015)
- Club: Club Venus de Toledo / C.G.R. Distrito III
- Head coach: Anna Baranova
- Assistant coach: Sara Bayón
- Retired: yes
Medal record
Rhythmic Gymnastics
Representing Spain
Event	1st	2nd	3rd
FIG World Cup	0	0	1
Total	0	0	1

Marina Viejo Mañanes (born 6 April 1996) is a retired Spanish rhythmic gymnast. She represented her country in international competitions.

== Career ==
Marina took up rhythmic gymnastics at age 6, she also tried other sports such as tennis, athletics, swimming and karate. In 2002 she joined the Venus Rhythmic Gymnastics Club in Toledo, and later moved to the District III Rhythmic Gymnastics Club in Alcalá de Henares, although she continued to live in Toledo. In 2010, as an individual, she was the Spanish junior team champion in Zaragoza.

In 2011 she joined the Spanish national team, becoming part of the senior group and training at the High Performance Centre in Madrid, although she was not a starter in competitions until 2014. The team was coached by national coach Anna Baranova together with Sara Bayón. She has since participated in several exhibitions with the reserve group, such as those held in July 2011 and February 2012 in Alicante, in June 2012 in San Cugat del Vallés, in November 2012 at Euskalgym, in March 2013 in La Moraleja and in April in Tres Cantos. On June 23, 2013, Marina performed for the first time with the main group during an exhibition in Valladolid, specifically in the routine with 3 balls and 2 ribbons. After her teammates were proclaimed world champions in September, she participated with them in a tour where she performed in several exhibition choreographies, such as those performed at the Arnold Classic Europe in Madrid and the Charity Gala in favor of Proyecto Hombre in Burgos, and posed in a team calendar whose purpose was to raise money to finance the upcoming competitions. In April 2014, Marina participated in two exhibitions with the reserve team on the International Day of Sport for Development and Peace, organized at the CSD, and with 10 clubs at the Queen's Cup in Guadalajara.

In August 2014 she made her debut as a regular in the group (that at the time was made of Sandra Aguilar, Elena López, Lourdes Mohedano and Alejandra Quereda) at the World Cup in Sofia as Artemi Gavezou got injured and had to be replaced by Marina in the routine with 3 balls & 2 ribbon and by Adelina Fominykh with 10 clubs. The group placed 4th in the All-Around, just 0.50 points away from bronze, behind Italy, Bulgaria and Russia. The following day, they won the bronze in the 10 clubs' final and were 5th (tied with Ukraine and Belarus) in the mixed event. After this first international appearance, in November she was welcomed at Toledo City Hall by Emiliano García-Page. That same month she performed with Claudia Heredia at the Royal Order of Sporting Merit awards ceremony. On December 20, 2014, she participated with the rest of the group in the tribute to her coach, Sara Bayón at the Marta Domínguez Pavilion in Palencia, performing two exhibitions.

In February 2015 she announced her retirement from the sport. On March 7, 2015, Marina received a Special Mention at the XXII Sports Gala 2014 of the province of Toledo. She studied psychology at the Complutense University of Madrid and is a rhythmic gymnastics coach at the Coslada Gymnastics Club, where she trains alongside former gymnast Carolina Malchair.
