= Adelina Fominykh =

Spanish rhythmic gymnast

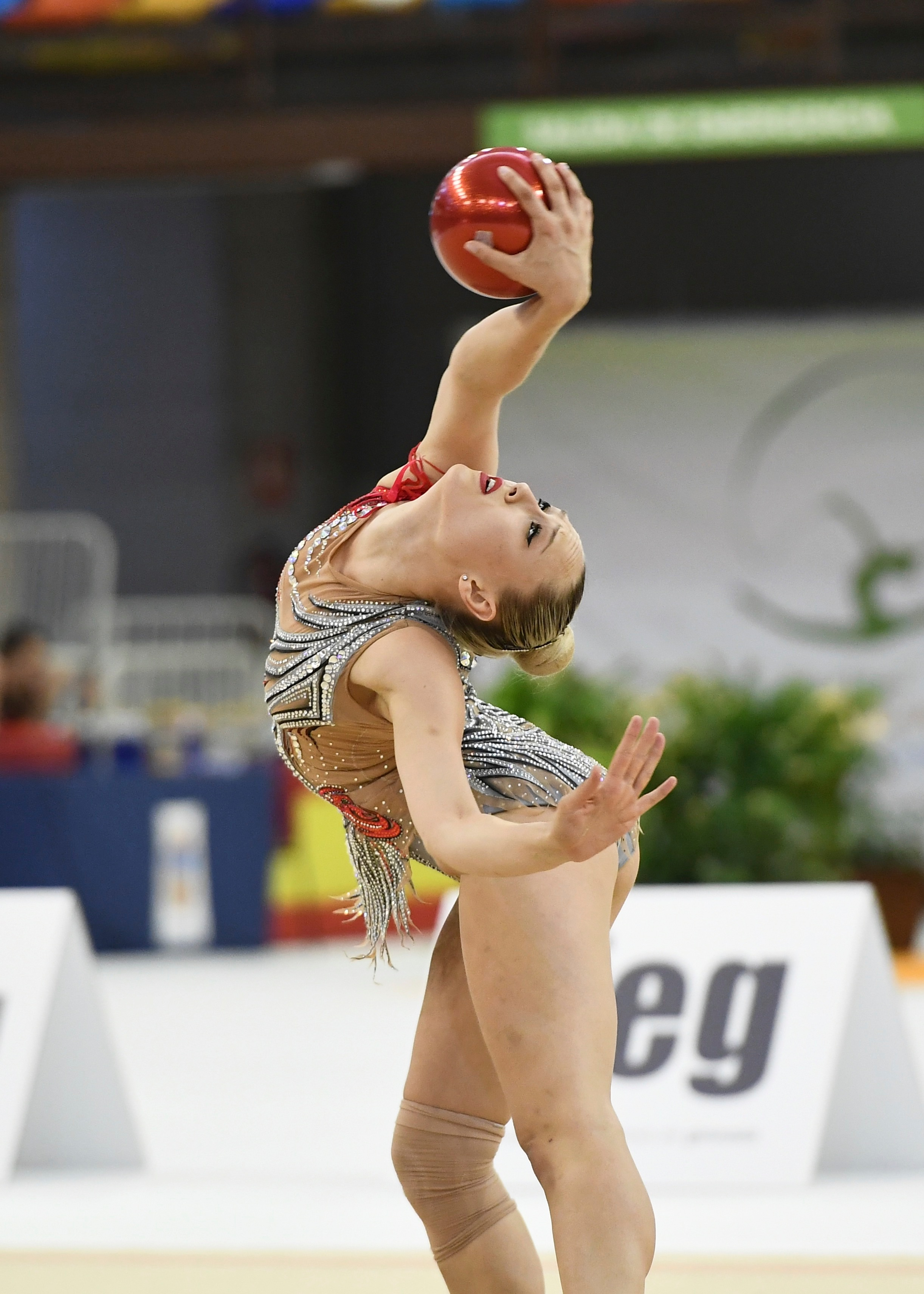

Personal information
- Born: 8 July 1997 (age 29) Izhevsk, Russia

Gymnastics career
- Discipline: Rhythmic gymnastics
- Country represented: Spain; (2012-2015)
- Club: Club Gimnàstic de Tarragona (2004 - 2007) / Club Muntanyenc Sant Cugat (2007 - 2010) / Club Gimnàstic Catalunya de Sabadell (2010) / C.E.R. Mediterrania (2011 - 2012) / A.G.R. Catalunya (2011 - 2012) / Club Rítmica Pozuelo (2015 - 2018) / Club Gimnasia Rítmica Leganés (2018 - present.) / Club Distrito III (2019)
- Head coach: Anna Baranova
- Assistant coach: Sara Bayón
- Retired: yes
Medal record
Rhythmic Gymnastics
Representing Spain
Event	1st	2nd	3rd
FIG World Cup	0	0	1
Total	0	0	1

Adelina Fominykh (born 8 July 1997) is a Spanish rhythmic gymnast of Russian descent. She was a member of the Spanish senior group.

== Biography ==
Fominykh took rhythmic gymnastics at the age of 3 in Izhevsk, her hometown. Her mother had practiced artistic gymnastics. She later came to Spain with her family when she was 5 years old. From the age of 7 to 10 she stayed at the Club Gimnàstic de Tarragona, In 2007 she participated in her first Spanish Championships. That same year she moved to the Club Muntanyenc Sant Cugat, where she stayed for the next three years. Afterwards she stayed for a year at the Club Gimnàstic Catalunya in Sabadell.

In 2011, at the age of 14, she joined the Club Esportiu Rítmica Mediterrania for one season, with this club she participated in the Spanish Championships in A Coruña, where she was 5th in the junior category (3rd with hoop, 4th with clubs, 11th with ball and 19th with ribbon), but she could not access the apparatus finals because her nationality change was still in process. In September 2011 she became part of the A.G.R. Catalunya, also known as the Catalan national team, training at the High Performance Centre (CAR) in Sant Cugat del Vallés, participating in the Spanish Group Championship in Zaragoza, winning gold overall and silver with the apparatus. In 2012 she switched back to the individual category as a junior with C.E.R. Mediterrania, winning bronze in the All-Around, silver with hoop, clubs and ball, at nationals.

At the end of September 2012, together with two other gymnasts from the A.G.R. Catalunya, Natalia García and Júlia Usón, and the coach Iratxe Aurrekoetxea, Fominykh took part in the Aeon Cup in Tokyo, her first international competition. There she placed 9th with hoop, 10th with ball and clubs, 7th with ribbon, 9th overall and 8th the team event. In October of the same year she joined the Spanish senior national team, training at the High Performance Center in Madrid as a member of the reserve group.

The group was coached by the head coach Anna Baranova together with Sara Bayón. Since then she has participated in several exhibitions with the group, such as those held at Euskalgym in November 2012, or with the reserve group in March 2013 in La Moraleja and in April in Tres Cantos. On June 16, 2013, Fominykh gave an exhibition at her former club, the Esportiu Rítmica Mediterrania in Santa Coloma de Cervelló, on the occasion of the end of the school year. After her teammates were proclaimed world champions in September, she participated with them in a tour where she performed in several galas, such as those performed at the Arnold Classic Europe in Madrid and the Charity Gala in favor of Proyecto Hombre in Burgos, and posed for a team calendar whose purpose was to raise money to pay for the upcoming competitions. Fominykh also gave an exhibition at the end of the year at the Christmas festival of the club where her younger sister trained in Lloret de Mar.

In April 2014, Fominykh participated in two exhibitions with the reserve team on the International Day of Sport for Development and Peace, organized at the CSD, and with 10 clubs at the Queen's Cup in Guadalajara. On June 8, she performed an exhibition at her former club, the C.E.R Mediterrania where she also performed with her sister. In July she also participated in an gala at the Vitry Cup tournament.

In August 2014 she made her debut as a regular in the group (that at the time was made of Sandra Aguilar, Elena López, Lourdes Mohedano and Alejandra Quereda) at the World Cup in Sofia as Artemi Gavezou got injured and had to be replaced by Fominykh in the routine with 10 clubs and by Marina Viejo in the mixed routine. During a training session prior to that same competition, a club cut Fominykh's eyebrow, although she ultimately decided to compete with the wound. The group placed 4th in the All-Around, just 0.50 points away from bronze, behind Italy, Bulgaria and Russia. The following day, they won the bronze in the 10 clubs' final and were 5th (tied with Ukraine and Belarus) in the mixed event. After her teammates became world champions for the second time, she traveled with them to the LG Whisen Rhythmic All Stars 2014 in Seoul, where she participated in an exhibition. On December 20, 2014, she participated with the rest of the group in the tribute to her coach, Sara Bayón at the Marta Domínguez Pavilion in Palencia, performing two exhibitions.

In early March 2015, Fominykh gave a master class with part of the team in Luarca, and at the beginning of May she travelled with the rest of the team to Ávila, where the starting group performed at the Spanish School Age Championships. Shortly afterwards she stopped training with the national team, although she continued to live at the Joaquín Blume Residence with the rest of the athletes. She then began training as a gymnast for the Pozuelo Rhythmic Club in Pozuelo de Alarcón.

On May 15, 2016, she won gold in the 1st category in the Individual and Team Regional Championship of the Community of Madrid. That same month she won gold again in the 1st category at the IV Summer Seasons Trophy. After being diagnosed with Achilles tendonitis, doctors advised her not to participate in the Spanish Individual Championship in June. On October 25, 2016, she underwent surgery for Haglund syndrome in her right foot at the Virgen del Mar Hospital in Madrid.

On June 18, 2017, she performed an exhibition at the I International Rhythmic Gymnastics Tournament Club EducoSport held in Colmenar Viejo, and on June 20, she performed another with the Pozuelo Rhythmic Club, being also honored at both events. On June 23, 2017, she underwent another operation on her right foot due to a postoperative infection, this time at the La Moraleja University Hospital in Sanchinarro. From September 8 to 11, Fominykh gave a master class at the III Campus of the Rítmica Lleida Club. Since June 2017 she has the Passenger Cabin Crew (TCP) certificate from the Escuela Superior Aeronáutica de Madrid.

On September 13, 2017, she announced via Instagram her return to gymnastics to compete with Rítmica Pozuelo. On September 16 she held an exhibition in the Plaza de Cibeles as part of the Actúa Madrid festival. On October 22 she competed with 5 hoops with the 1st category group of the Pozuelo Rhythmic Club at MadRit'17, a regional group tournament, on the 28th at the VII Maite Nadal Trophy in Guadalajara, obtaining bronze, and on the 29th at the Regional Group Championship in Torrejón de Ardoz, where they won silver. On November 4 she participated in the IX National Trophy in Utebo, then they competed in the Euskalgym National Group Tournament in Vitoria, finishing 4th, and on the 26th in the Spanish Group Cup in Alicante, finishing 12th. On December 2, in the last competition of the season, the Spanish Rhythmic Group Championship in Valladolid, they finished 14th in the 1st category. That same year, her friend Marina Casals created the Adelina Fominykh Club in Lérida, trained by Casals herself and of which Fominykh is vice president.

For the 2018 season, Fominykh returned to the individual category, this time in the 1st category. Although she initially planned to compete in the senior category because she had lost her 1st category place due to her two-year absence due to injury, the change in the rules allowed her to compete only in the 1st category. On March 24, she participated in the XXII International Rumi and Albena Tournament, held in Varna, where she finished 10th overall and 7th with both hoop and ball. After the IV Spring Seasons Trophy in Arganda del Rey, on April 22 she competed in the Queen's Cup in Guadalajara, finishing 9th in the team category and 11th in the hoop. Later, in May she won silver in the general classification of the Individual Regional Championship in Torrejón de Ardoz. In June she won gold in the general classification of the IV Summer Seasons Trophy in Arganda del Rey, and also won gold with both hoop and ball at the XIII International Tournament of Santa Marinella. On June 23, at the Spanish Championships she was 18th place overall in the 1st category, she competed with a torn meniscus, having suffered a tear of the posterior horn of the right internal meniscus a month earlier.

In September 2018, she began training as a gymnast for the Leganés Rhythmic Gymnastics Club at the Blanca Ares Pavilion in Leganés. Although she was initially scheduled to undergo meniscus surgery in November of that year, she was ultimately able to avoid the procedure. For the 2019 season, she competes in the senior individual category. On February 9, she participated in the IX International Rhythmic Infantado Tournament in Guadalajara, winning gold in hoop and silver in ball. On March 3, in the preliminary control of the Queen's Cup held in Arganda del Rey, she qualified in first place with the ball, which gave her direct passage to compete in the Queen's Cup in Guadalajara in April. She finished third with ribbon and hoop, so she was unable to qualify, as only the gymnasts who obtained first place were eligible. On March 16, she participated in free hands and ribbon in the 1st Phase of the Iberdrola Club League, held in Zaragoza, joining the ranks of Club Distrito III in the 2nd Division and making her debut in this competition. In it, she achieved 7th place in teams, won silver in free hands and 4th place with ribbon. The free hands exercise, which she debuted at this event, was created by Eduardo Martínez, principal dancer of the National Ballet. On March 30, at the IV Spring Seasons Trophy in Leganés, she won gold with both hoop and ribbon. On April 13, she competed in the Individual Queen's Cup, finishing 8th in the team competition with the Madrid Federation and 6th with ball. On May 5, Adelina won gold at the Regional Championship, thus qualifying for the Individual Spanish Championships.

On May 20, 2019, just one month before the Spanish Championships, and during a training session in preparation for the 2nd Phase of the Liga Iberdrola, she suffered an injury to her left knee. The injury consisted of a tear of the internal meniscus, a tear of the anterior cruciate ligament, an injury to the internal collateral ligament and a Baker's cyst. This led her to substantially modify her exercises and to perform several of the planned elements supporting herself with the opposite leg. Finally, on June 20, she competed with an injection in the Spanish Individual Championships in Palma de Mallorca, but after finishing her first exercise, hoop, with severe discomfort and pain in her knee, she had to abandon the competition. She underwent successful surgery for this injury on August 5.

In March 2020 she release a music single titled "Piña & fresa", followed by a remix featuring Boy Flow yand Erick Galán. On December 1 she returned to competition at the Spanish Team Championship in Valencia to compete in the senior category alongside Mercedes Flores, achieving 9th place in it and being 12th with ball and 10th with clubs. In January 2021 she published her debut book "Volar entre cintas de colores". After several individual tournaments, on July 18 she competed on loan to Club Distrito III in the 2nd Phase of the Spanish Team Cup, winning the silver medal in the 1st category. In this championship, she competed alongside her sister Melani Yolanta. On May 8, 2022, Adelina competed in the Regional Championship in Leganés, where she won gold in the senior category and qualified for the Spanish Championships.
