= Paula Orive =

Spanish rhythmic gymnast

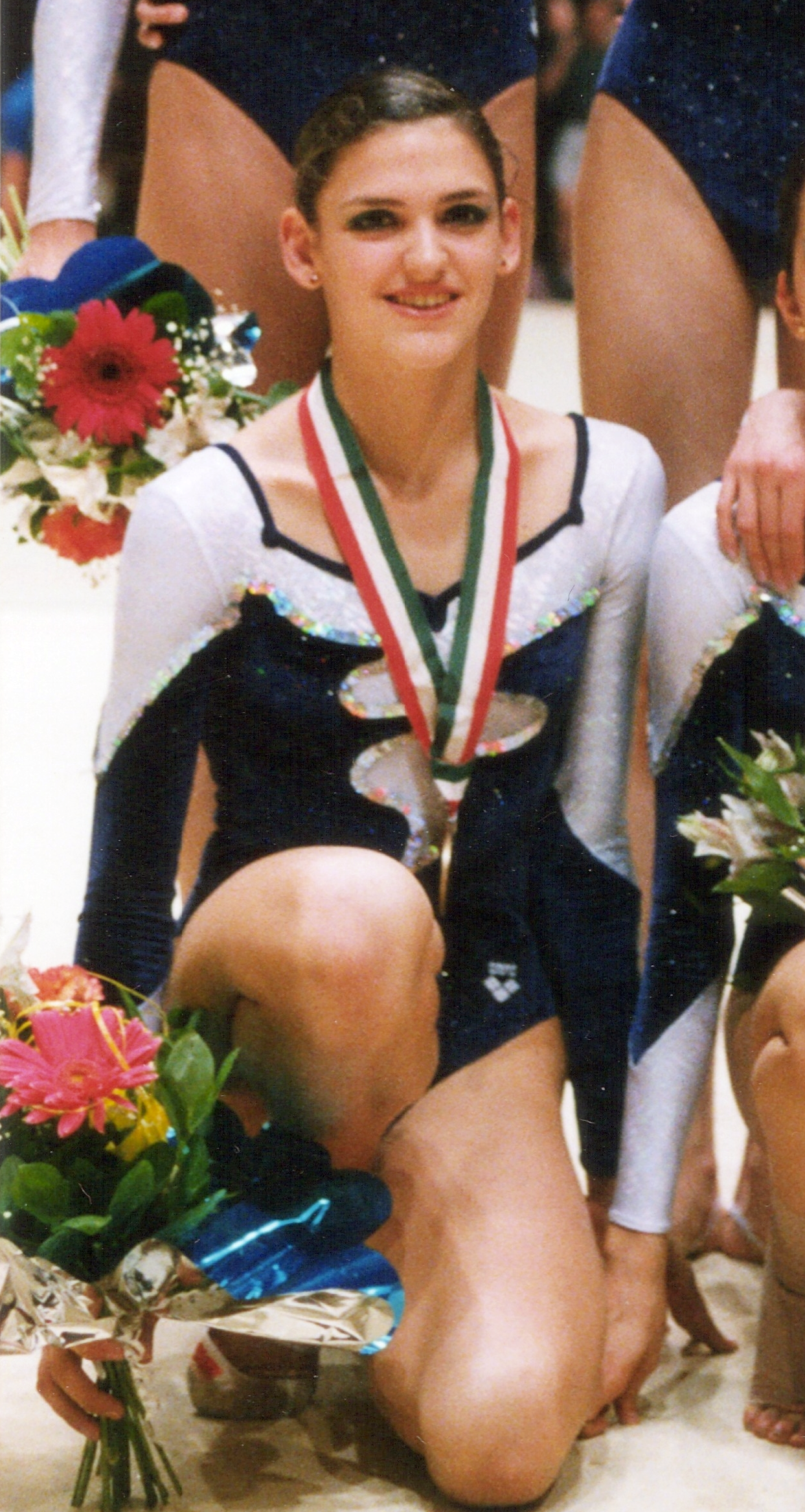

Personal information
- Full name: Paula Orive Ozores
- Born: 29 November 1982 (age 43) Vitoria-Gasteiz, Spain
- Height: 169 cm (5 ft 7 in)

Gymnastics career
- Discipline: Rhythmic gymnastics
- Country represented: Spain (1997-1999)
- Club: Club Arabatxo / Club Oskitxo
- Head coach: Nancy Usero
- Assistant coach: Dalia Kutkaite
- Former coaches: María Fernández Ostolaza, Agurtzane Ibargutxi, Natalia Notchevnaya
- Choreographer: Cristina Álvarez
- Retired: yes
Medal record
Rhythmic Gymnastics
Representing Spain
World Championships
Gold medal – first place	1998 Seville	3 Ribbons + 2 Hoops
Silver medal – second place	1998 Seville	Group All-around
European Championships
Bronze medal – third place	1999 Budapest	3 Ribbons + 2 Hoops

Paula Orive Ozores (born 29 November 1982) is a retired Spanish rhythmic gymnast. As a member of the senior group she is a European and World medalist.

== Biography ==
After practicing swimming at the Fundación Estadio, Paula began rhythmic gymnastics at the age of 7. She first entered the Arabatxo Club with the trainer Agurtzane Ibargutxi, and later moved to the Oskitxo Club in Vitoria until 1992, a club from which other outstanding Spanish gymnasts such as Lorena Guréndez or Beatriz Nogalez have emerged, under the orders of Natalia Notchevnaya. In 1994 she was the Spanish children's champion, and in both 1995 and 1996, she was the Spanish junior team champion with Oskitxo. In 1996 she was Spanish junior individual champion. That same year she began to participate in international tournaments as junior in Fukuoka, Calais and Portimão, achieving some 4th places and several bronze medals. In 1997 she competed in the honor category in the Spanish Individual Championships held in Valladolid, being 4th overall and winning bronze with both rope and clubs. In July 1997 she joined the national senior group called up by María Fernández Ostolaza who replaced Emilia Boneva, who had undergone heart surgery in November 1996.

Paula did not compete as a starter until September at the Epson Cup in Tokyo, where she won gold. By 1997, the group members had already moved their residence from the chalet in Canillejas to a building attached to the INEF and had begun training at the Madrid High Performance Center. In 1998 they competed with 3 ribbons and 2 hoops and with 5 balls, using the Sevillian "Juego de luna y arena" (inspired by a poem by Lorca) and the tango "El vaivén", two songs by José Luis Barroso, for their music cuts. Paula would be a starter that year in both routines. After the group competed in some preparatory tournaments in Kalamata and Budapest, at the World Championships in Seville, Paula, Sara Bayón, Marta Calamonte, Lorena Guréndez, Carolina Malchair, Beatriz Nogalesz and Nuria Cabanillas became world champions with 3 ribbons and 2 hoops where the team managed to beat Belarus with a score of 19.850. Furthermore, on the first day the team had obtained the silver medal in the All-Around with a cumulative score of 39.133. They placed 7th in the 5-ball competition. The group received the Longines Award for Elegance in this championship, a trophy awarded by the watch brand and the FIG during prominent international gymnastics competitions.

By 1999 Nancy Usero was the group's new coach and national head coach. That season Nancy had Dalia Kutkaite as assistant and coach of the junior group, and Cristina Álvarez as choreographer the first year. During that year, they competed with 3 ribbons and 2 hoops and with 10 clubs, the first using "Zorongo gitano" and the second with "Babelia" by Chano Domínguez, Hozan Yamamoto and Javier Paxariño, as music. Paula was one of the starters in both routines along Bayón, Calamonte, Guréndez, Malchair and Nogales. At the end of May, at the European Championships in Budapest, the group was 7th in the All-Around due to a poor score in the 10 clubs exercise. They won bronze in the 3 ribbons and 2 hoops final. In August the group won silver with 3 ribbons and 2 hoops at the DTB-Pokal in Bochum. At the end of September they placed 7th in the All-Around at the World Championships in Osaka, which gave them qualification for the Sydney Olympic Games the following year. Subsequently, they placed 6th in both event finals.

However, Paula could not compete in the Olympic Games since coach Nancy Usero decided to let her go along her and her teammates Marta Alves, Sara Bayón and Ana del Toro, so she retired in November 1999.

After retiring from competition in March 2000 she received a tribute from the Basque Gymnastics Federation. Later she obtained the title of national coach of 3rd level and graduated in physical education and sports. Shortly after, she began directing, along with Diana Rodríguez, the cheerleaders of the Saski Baskonia basketball team from Vitoria, known as Dancing Team Baskonia, also working as a cheerleader on some occasions. She is currently technical director and coach of the Oskitxo Club of Vitoria, after having been assistant to coach Natalia Notchevnaya since 2000. In November 2016, together with María Ereñaga, she promoted a joint technicalization project called Gimnasia Vitoria, which is made up of the clubs they direct, Rítmica Vitoria and Oskitxo, in which Lorena Guréndez, Tania Lamarca and Estíbaliz Martínez are also involved in different areas. In April 2020, one of the jerseys with which she became world champion was auctioned for €975 (equivalent to €1,143 in 2023) in a charity bid for the fight against COVID-19.
