= Claudia Heredia =

Spanish rhythmic gymnast (born 1998)

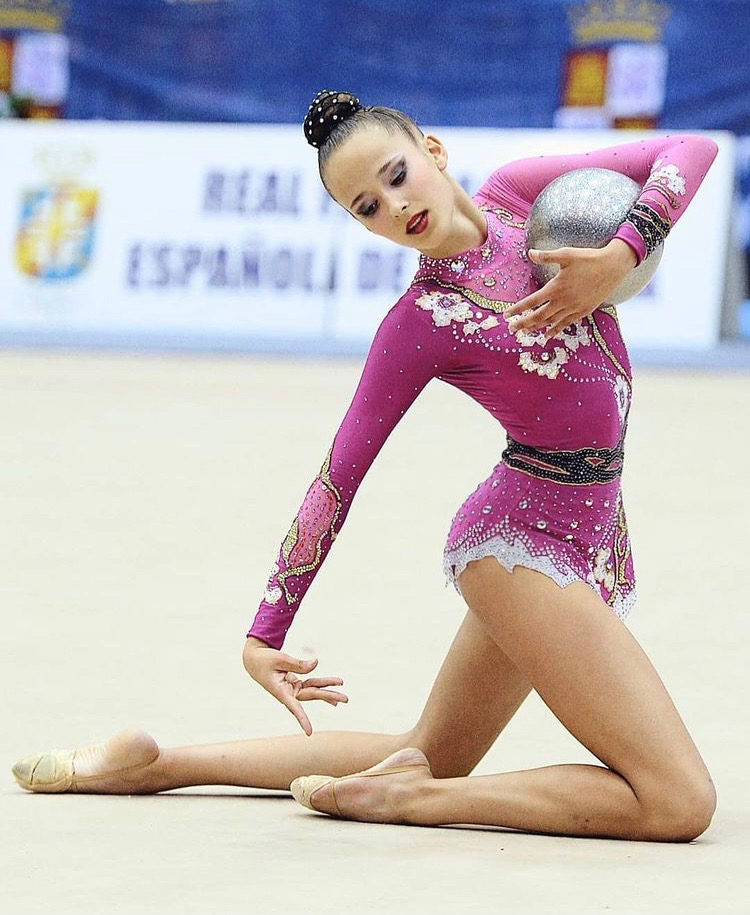

Personal information
- Full name: Claudia Heredia Simón
- Born: 13 March 1998 (age 28) Torrevieja, Spain

Gymnastics career
- Discipline: Rhythmic gymnastics
- Country represented: Spain (2012-2016)
- Club: E.M.G.R. Torrevieja / Club Gimnasia Rítmica Torrevieja
- Head coach: Anna Baranova
- Assistant coach: Sara Bayón
- Former coaches: Mónica Ferrández, Yolanda Andrés
- Retired: yes
Medal record
Rhythmic Gymnastics
Representing Spain
Event	1st	2nd	3rd
FIG World Cup	0	0	3
Total	0	0	3

Claudia Heredia Simón (born 13 March 1998) is a retired Spanish rhythmic gymnast. She represented her country internationally as part of the national senior group.

== Biography ==
Heredia started practicing rhythmic gymnastics at the age of 9 in the Municipal School of Rhythmic Gymnastics of Torrevieja, later moving to the Club Torrevieja, where she trained with coaches like Mari Carmen Moreno. With the club would participate in various Spanish Championships both as an individual and in group. In 2010 she was 6th in the children's category in Valladolid. In 2011 she took 7th place in the same competitions, that year she also achieved the 7th position in the All-Around of the Spanish Group Championship in Zaragoza.

In the summer of 2012 she was called up to be part of the national junior group that would participate in the European Championships the following year, the group was coached by Mónica Ferrández and Yolanda Andrés. In November 2012 she participated with her junior group at an exhibition at the Euskalgym. In April 2013 they premiered their exercise at an exhibition at the Copa de la Reina in Zaragoza. On 31 May Claudia, Paula Gómez, Sara González, Miriam Guerra, Carmen Martínez and Victoria Plaza, participated in the European Championships in Vienna, where they placed 16th in the All-Around after two rotations with 5 hoops. In June she participated in the honor category of the Spanish Championships in Valladolid, where she was 5th overall and with ball, and 4th with hoop. Since July she trained under Ferrández and Andrés together with Polina Berezina.

In September 2013, at the age of 15 she joined the national senior group, training at the High Performance Center (CAR) in Madrid, combining it with her studies at the IES Ortega y Gasset. The group was trained by the head coach Anna Baranova together with Sara Bayón. After her teammates were crowned world champions in Kyiv, she participated with them in a tour where she performed in several exhibition choreographies, such as those performed at the Arnold Classic Europe in Madrid and the Charity Gala in favour of Proyecto Hombre in Burgos, and posed in a team calendar whose aim was to raise money to cover the cost of upcoming competitions.

On March 29, 2014, she made her debut as a member of the senior group in an exhibition in Vera within the framework of the Spanish Championship for People with Intellectual Disabilities, where she performed the 10 clubs exercise. In April, she participated in two exhibitions with the reserve team on the International Day of Sport for Development and Peace, organized at the CSD, and in 10 clubs at the Queen's Cup in Guadalajara. In June, she was honored at the closing ceremony of the course at the Municipal School of Torrevieja, where she started. In September she travelled to Izmir to support her teammates, who became world champions with 10 clubs for the second consecutive time, and in November she performed with Marina Viejo at the Royal Order of Sporting Merit award ceremony. On December 20, 2014, she participated with the rest of the group in the tribute to her coach, Sara Bayón at the Marta Domínguez Pavilion in Palencia, performing two exhibitions.

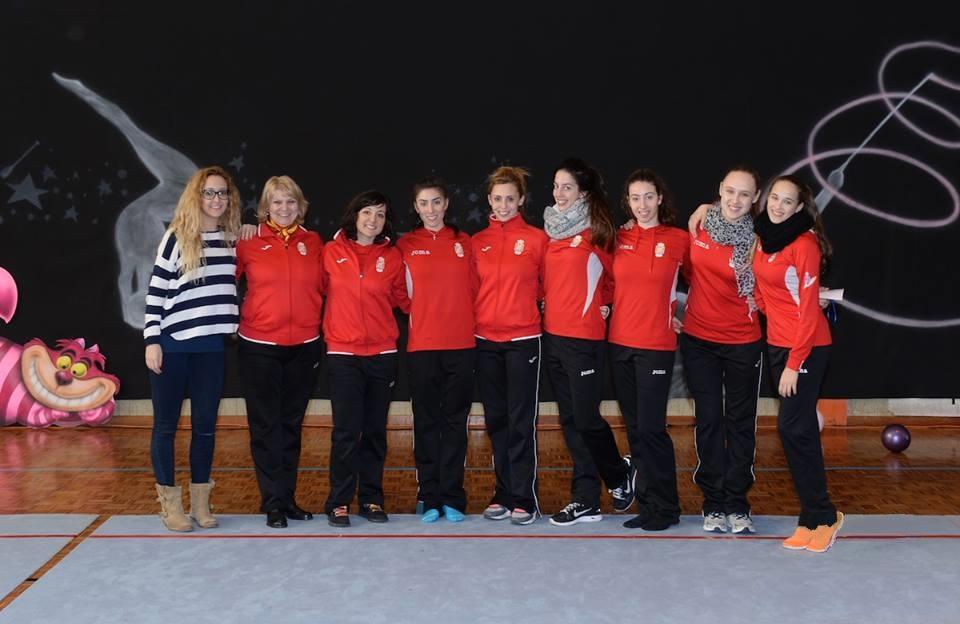
Part of the Spanish rhythmic gymnastics team during a masterclass in Luarca in March 2015. Heredia is standing on the far right.

In the first competitions of the 2015 season she became a starter in both exercises. Thus, Claudia and Lidia Redondo were part of the main group together with Sandra Aguilar, Artemi Gavezou and Alejandra Quereda. At the beginning of March, she gave a master class together with part of the team in Luarca. On March 21 she made her debut with the group in competition at the Grand Prix in Thiais, being 6th overall and 8th with 6 clubs & 2 hoops, winning silver with 5 ribbons. That month, the group participated in the World Cup in Lisbon, taking silver in the All-Around and in the mixed event. In April they competed in the Pesaro World Cup, winning bronze in the All-Around, also being 7th with 5 ribbons and 5th with 2 hoops and 6 clubs, there Heredia competed only in the mixed routine with hoops and clubs. At the beginning of May, the group participated in two exhibitions at the Spanish School Age Championships held in Ávila, with Claudia participating in both exercises, and in the International Tournament of Corbeil-Essonnes where she performed in the mixed routine. In July she again gave a master class, alone this time, organized by the Club Recta Final in Luarca. In September she travelled with the Spanish delegation to Stuttgart, where the group won bronze in the All-Around at the World Championships and qualified for the Rio Olympics. On 17 November Claudia and her teammates attended the Premios Nacionales del Deporte, where they were awarded the Barón de Güell Cup for the best national team of 2014, an award from the Consejo Superior de Deportes that was collected by Alejandra Quereda, the team captain, and Jesús Carballo, president of the Federation, from the hands of King Felipe VI of Spain.

At the beginning of March 2016, Claudia and the group won the 3 gold medals at stake in the Schmiden International Tournament. In June, she participated with the rest of the group in the exhibition gala of the World Cup in Guadalajara. In August, Heredia traveled to the Olympic Games in Rio de Janeiro as a substitute, to accompany the national group (because only five gymnasts were allowed per team) which would win Olympic silver. She retired shortly after.

In March 2018, Claudia and fellow international gymnast Sandra Aguilar made their debut as judges at the Individual Base Qualifying Championships and Group Base Cup in Torrelavega. In 2020 she graduated as a national rhythmic gymnastics coach of 3rd level. She studied architecture at the Catholic University of San Antonio de Murcia and the Polytechnic University of Milan.
