= Alejandra Quereda =

Spanish rhythmic gymnast

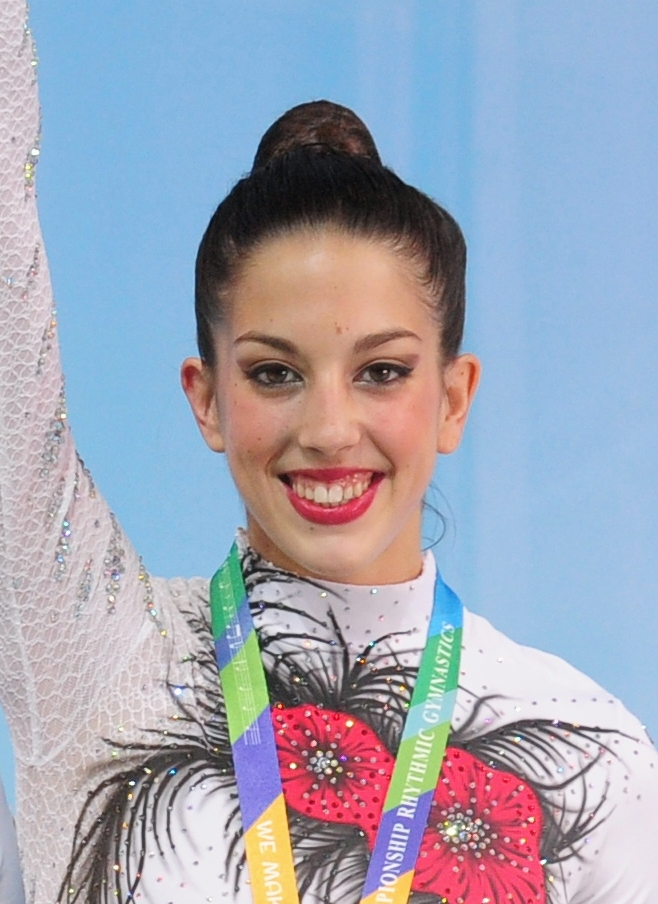
- Quereda at the 2013 World Championships

Personal information
- Full name: Alejandra Quereda Flores
- Born: 24 July 1992 (age 34) Alicante, Spain
- Height: 175 cm (5 ft 9 in)

Gymnastics career
- Discipline: Rhythmic gymnastics
- Country represented: Spain (2010-2016)
- Head coach: Anna Baranova
- Assistant coach: Sara Bayón
Medal record
Group Rhythmic Gymnastics
Representing Spain
Olympic Games
Silver medal – second place	2016 Rio de Janeiro	Group All-around
World Championships
Gold medal – first place	2014 Izmir	10 Clubs
Gold medal – first place	2013 Kyiv	10 Clubs
Bronze medal – third place	2013 Kyiv	3 Balls + 2 Ribbons
Bronze medal – third place	2015 Stuttgart	Group All-around
European Championships
Silver medal – second place	2016 Holon	6 Clubs + 2 Hoops
Bronze medal – third place	2014 Baku	10 clubs
Bronze medal – third place	2016 Holon	5 Ribbons

Alejandra Quereda Flores (born 24 July 1992 in Alicante) is a Spanish former group rhythmic gymnast and current coach. She won a silver medal in the group all-around at the 2016 Summer Olympics, and she is a two-time World champion in 10 clubs. She also competed at the 2012 Summer Olympics and won three medals at the European Championships. Since 2020, she has been the coach of the Spanish national group.

== Gymnastics career ==
Quereda competed at her first World Championships in 2009, where the Spanish group finished sixth in the all-around. She competed then at the 2010 World Championships despite a shoulder injury. There, Spain finished 15th in the group all-around. She was also part of the Spanish group that finished 12th at the 2011 World Championships.

Quereda helped Spain win the all-around competition at the 2012 Olympic Test Event, winning an Olympic berth in the process. She then represented Spain at the 2012 Summer Olympics alongside Loreto Achaerandio, Sandra Aguilar, Elena López, Lourdes Mohedano, and Lidia Redondo. The Spanish group finished fourth, less than half a point behind the bronze medalists. Quereda and most of the group members continued to train with the goal of winning an Olympic medal in 2016.

Quereda helped Spain win the gold medal in the 10 clubs final at the 2013 World Championships. Additionally, the group won a bronze medal in the 3 balls and 2 ribbons final. At the 2014 European Championships, Spain won the bronze medal in the 10 clubs final, behind Bulgaria and Russia. Quereda and the Spanish group only placed 11th in the all-around at the 2014 World Championships after major errors in the 3 balls and 2 ribbons routine. However, they were able to successfully defend their 10 clubs World title.

Quereda represented Spain at the 2015 European Games, where the group finished fourth in the all-around. At the 2015 World Championships, Quereda won a bronze medal in the group all-around competition, which also secured the group's place at the 2016 Summer Olympics. She won two medals with the Spanish group at the 2016 European Championships– a silver in 6 clubs and 2 hoops and a bronze medal in 5 ribbons.

Quereda competed at the 2016 Summer Olympics in Rio de Janeiro, Brazil, alongside Elena López, Artemi Gavezou, Sandra Aguilar, Lourdes Mohedano. She was the captain of the Spanish group that won the silver medal in the group all-around. This was Spain's first Olympic medal in rhythmic gymnastics since the group won the gold medal at the 1996 Summer Olympics. In a 2023 interview, Quereda remarked that this silver medal "felt like gold". Quereda retired from the sport after these Olympic Games.

== Coaching career ==
Quereda began coaching the individual rhythmic gymnasts of the Spanish national team in 2018. She moved to coaching the Spanish national group in 2020. She coached the groups that competed at the 2024 Summer Olympics and won two bronze medals at the 2025 World Championships.

== Detailed Olympic results ==
Year	Competition Description	Location	Music	Apparatus	Rank	Score-Final	Rank	Score-Qualifying
2016	Olympics	Rio de Janeiro		All-around	2nd	35.766	1st	35.749
2016	Olympics	Rio de Janeiro	Vida Carnaval, Bahiana/Batucada, Sambuka by Carlinhos Brown, Inner Sense & Richard Sliwa, Artem Uzunov	5 Ribbons	1st	17.800	1st	17.783
2016	Olympics	Rio de Janeiro	Cementerio Judío, Soleá, La Aurora de Nueva York by Compañía Rafael Amargo, Montse Cortés	6 Clubs / 2 Hoops	5th	17.966	2nd	17.966

Year	Competition Description	Location	Music	Apparatus	Rank	Score-Final	Rank	Score-Qualifying
2012	Olympics	London		All-around	4th	54.950	5th	54.550
2012	Olympics	London	Red Violin Remix (Aranjuez) by Ikuko Kawai	5 Balls	5th	27.400	5th	27.150
2012	Olympics	London	Malagueña by Stanley Black And His Orchestra, Placido Domingo	3 Ribbons / 2 Hoops	3rd	27.550	3rd	27.400
