= Elena López =

Spanish rhythmic gymnast

Elena Lopez
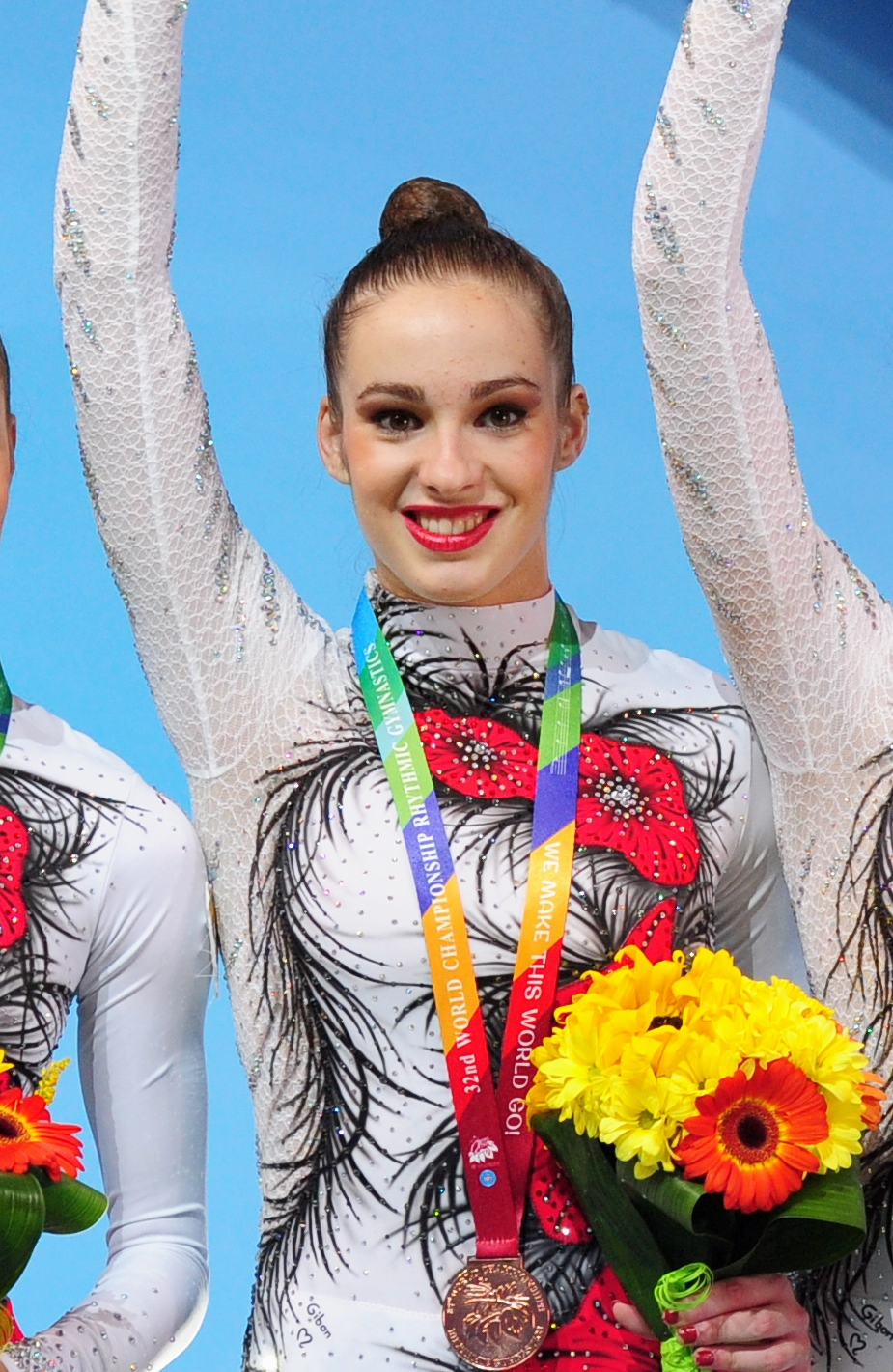
- Lopez in 2014

Personal information
- Full name: Elena López Benaches
- Born: 4 October 1994 (age 31) Valencia, Spain

Gymnastics career
- Discipline: Rhythmic gymnastics
- Country represented: Spain (2011-)
Medal record
Representing Spain
Group Rhythmic Gymnastics
Olympic Games
Silver medal – second place	2016 Rio de Janeiro	Group All-around
World Championships
Gold medal – first place	2014 Izmir	10 Clubs
Gold medal – first place	2013 Kiev	10 Clubs
Bronze medal – third place	2013 Kiev	3 Balls/2 Ribbons
Bronze medal – third place	2015 Stuttgart	Group All-around
European Championships
Silver medal – second place	2016 Holon	6 Clubs/2 Hoops
Bronze medal – third place	2014 Baku	10 clubs
Bronze medal – third place	2016 Holon	5 Ribbons

Elena López Benaches (Note: In this Spanish name, the first or paternal surname is López and the second or maternal family name is Benaches.) (born 4 October 1994 in Valencia) is a Spanish group rhythmic gymnast.

== Career ==
López represents her nation at international competitions. She participated at the 2012 Summer Olympics and ended on 4th place in Group All-Around. She has also competed at world championships, including at the 2015 World Rhythmic Gymnastics Championships where she won the bronze medal in the all-around event.

López competed at the 2016 Summer Olympics in Rio de Janeiro, Brazil, where she was a member of the Spanish group (together with Sandra Aguilar, Artemi Gavezou, Lourdes Mohedano, Alejandra Quereda) that won silver medal in group-all around.

== Detailed Olympic results ==
Year	Competition Description	Location	Music	Apparatus	Rank	Score-Final	Rank	Score-Qualifying
2016	Olympics	Rio de Janeiro		All-around	2nd	35.766	1st	35.749
2016	Olympics	Rio de Janeiro	Vida Carnaval, Bahiana/Batucada, Sambuka by Carlinhos Brown, Inner Sense & Richard Sliwa, Artem Uzunov	5 Ribbons	1st	17.800	1st	17.783
2016	Olympics	Rio de Janeiro	Cementerio Judío, Soleá, La Aurora de Nueva York by Compañía Rafael Amargo, Montse Cortés	6 Clubs / 2 Hoops	5th	17.966	2nd	17.966

Year	Competition Description	Location	Music	Apparatus	Rank	Score-Final	Rank	Score-Qualifying
2012	Olympics	London		All-around	4th	54.950	5th	54.550
2012	Olympics	London	Red Violin Remix (Aranjuez) by Ikuko Kawai	5 Balls	5th	27.400	5th	27.150
2012	Olympics	London	Malagueña by Stanley Black And His Orchestra, Placido Domingo	3 Ribbons / 2 Hoops	3rd	27.550	3rd	27.400
