= 1998 World Rhythmic Gymnastics Championships =

- Location: Seville, Spain
- Start date: 6 May 1998
- End date: 10 May 1998

XXII World Rhythmic Gymnastics Championships were held in Seville, Spain, May 6–10, 1998. This edition had only group events.

== Medal winners ==
Event	Gold	Silver	Bronze
All-around	Belarus	Spain	Russia
5 Balls	Russia	Belarus	Ukraine
3 Ribbons + 2 Hoops	Spain	Belarus	Ukraine

== Groups All-Around ==
Rank	Nation	5	3 + 2	Total
1st place, gold medalist(s)	Belarus	19.766	19.600	39.366
2nd place, silver medalist(s)	Spain	19.333	19.800	39.133
3rd place, bronze medalist(s)	Russia	19.533	19.599	39.132
4	Ukraine	19.600	19.433	39.033
5	Bulgaria	19.566	19.408	38.974
6	Greece	19.433	19.433	38.866
7	Italy	19.466	19.399	38.865
8	Japan	19.216	19.200	38.416
9	China	19.300	19.099	38.399
10	Hungary	19.133	19.166	38.299
11	Romania	18.933	19.066	37.999
12	Portugal	18.933	18.833	37.766
13	Brazil	18.941	18.766	37.707
14	Germany	18.399	19.300	37.699
15	France	18.766	18.833	37.599
16	USA	18.583	18.733	37.316
17	Czech Republic	18.475	18.766	37.241
18	Slovakia	18.391	18.833	37.224
19	Kazakhstan	18.741	18.466	37.207
20	Austria	18.533	18.599	37.132
21	Netherlands	18.408	18.633	37.041
22	Finland	18.208	18.716	36.924
23	Canada	18.166	18.750	36.916
24	Slovenia	18.391	18.499	36.890
25	South Korea	17.866	18.600	36.466
26	Lithuania	18.007	18.133	36.140
27	Australia	17.866	18.241	36.107

== Groups 5 Balls ==
Place	Nation	Result
1	Russia	19.850
2	Belarus	19.816
3	Ukraine	19.716
4	Bulgaria	19.700
5	Italy	19.683
6	Greece	19.666
7	Spain	19.566
8	Germany	19.299

== Groups 3 Ribbons + 2 Hoops ==
Place	Nation	Result
1	Spain	19.850
2	Belarus	19.800
3	Ukraine	19.766
4	Russia	19.666
5	Bulgaria	19.616
6	Greece	19.566
7	China	19.300
8	Italy	19.032

== Medal table ==
Rank	Nation	Gold	Silver	Bronze	Total
1	Belarus	1	2	0	3
2	Spain	1	1	0	2
3	Russia	1	0	1	2
4	Ukraine	0	0	2	2
Totals (4 entries)		3	3	3	9
