= Loreto Achaerandio =

Spanish rhythmic gymnast (born 1991)

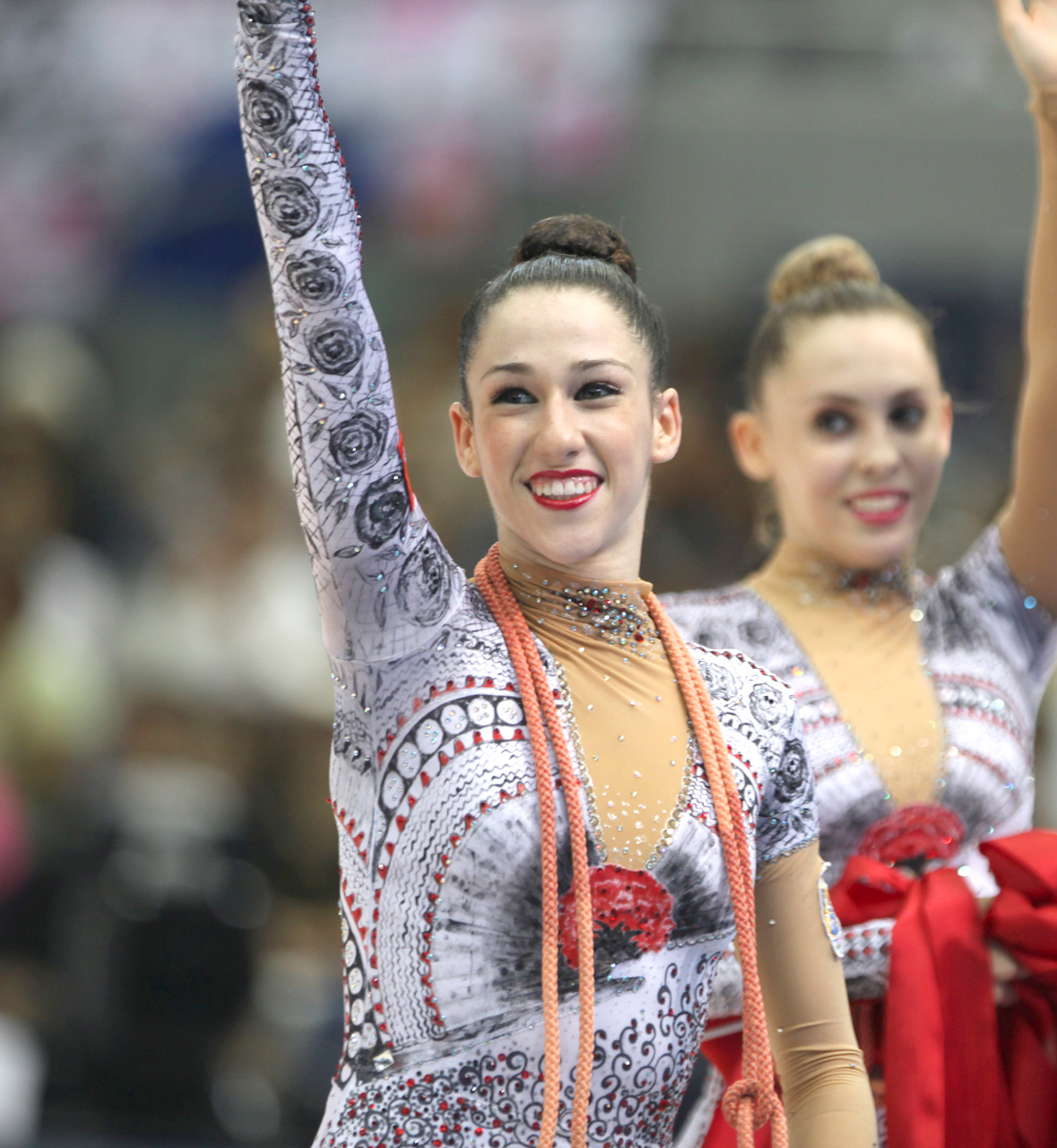

Personal information
- Nationality: Spanish
- Born: 13 September 1991 (age 33); Madrid, Spain

Sport
- Sport: Rhythmic gymnastics

Loreto Achaerandio Sánchez-Marín (born 13 September 1991) is a Spanish rhythmic gymnast, born in Madrid. She competed at the 2012 Summer Olympics in London, and the 2009, 2010 and 2011 Rhythmic Gymnastics World Championships.
