= Marta Calamonte =

Spanish rhythmic gymnast

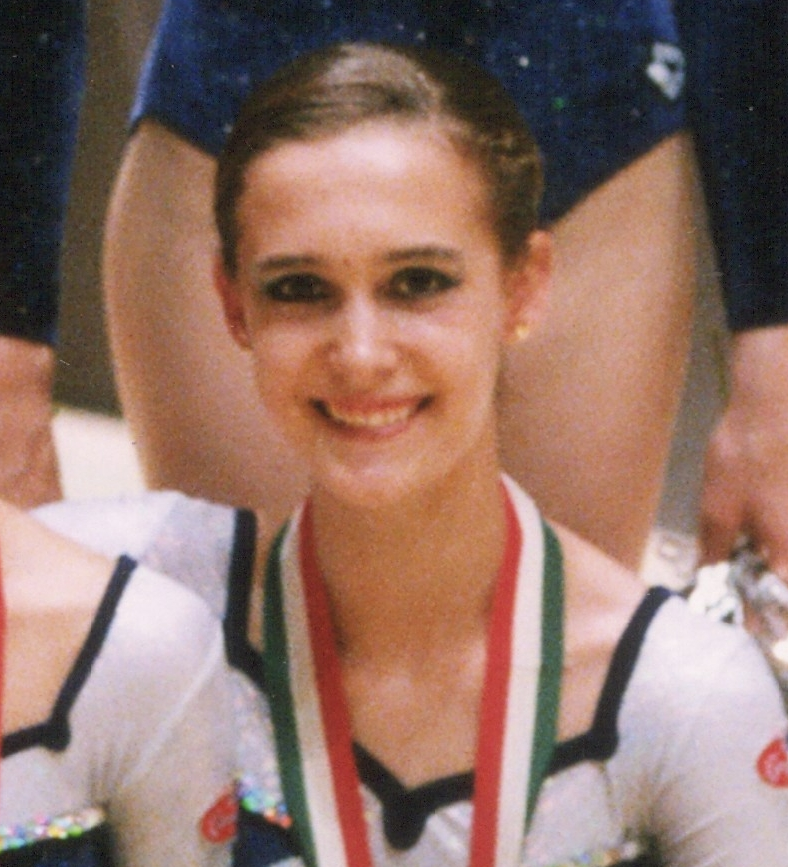

Personal information
- Full name: Marta Calamonte Márquez
- Nationality: Spanish
- Born: 30 July 1982 (age 43); Mérida, Spain

Sport
- Sport: Rhythmic gymnastics

Marta Calamonte Márquez (Note: In this Spanish name, the first or paternal surname is Calamonte and the second or maternal family name is Márquez.) (born 30 July 1982) is a Spanish rhythmic gymnast, born in Mérida. She competed at the 2000 Summer Olympics in Sydney.
