= Lourdes Mohedano =

Spanish rhythmic gymnast

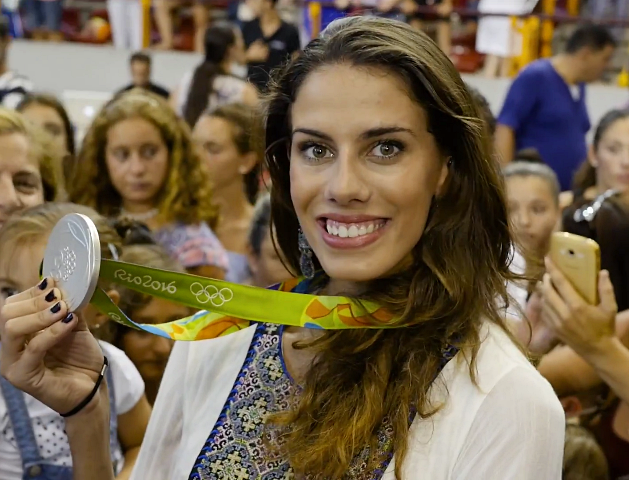
- Mohedano in 2016

Personal information
- Full name: Lourdes Mohedano Sanchez de Mora
- Born: 17 June 1995 (age 31) Córdoba, Spain

Gymnastics career
- Discipline: Rhythmic gymnastics
- Country represented: Spain (2011-2016)
- Retired: yes
Medal record
Group Rhythmic Gymnastics
Representing Spain
Olympic Games
Silver medal – second place	2016 Rio de Janeiro	Group All-around
World Championships
Gold medal – first place	2014 Izmir	10 Clubs
Gold medal – first place	2013 Kyiv	10 Clubs
Bronze medal – third place	2013 Kyiv	3 Balls/2 Ribbons
Bronze medal – third place	2015 Stuttgart	Group All-around
European Championships
Silver medal – second place	2016 Holon	6 Clubs/2 Hoops
Bronze medal – third place	2014 Baku	10 clubs
Bronze medal – third place	2016 Holon	5 Ribbons

Lourdes Mohedano Sanchez de Mora (born 17 June 1995 in Córdoba) is a Spanish group rhythmic gymnast.

== Career ==
Mohedano represents her nation at international competitions. She participated at the 2012 Summer Olympics. She also competed at world championships, including at the 2015 World Rhythmic Gymnastics Championships where she won the bronze medal in the all-around event. In 2016, she got a silver medal in the Rio Olympic Games, as the second best rhythm gymnastics group.

Mohedano competed at the 2016 Summer Olympics in Rio de Janeiro, Brazil where she was member of the Spanish group (together with Elena López, Artemi Gavezou, Sandra Aguilar, Alejandra Quereda) that won silver medal in group-all around.

== Detailed Olympic results ==
Year	Competition Description	Location	Music	Apparatus	Rank	Score-Final	Rank	Score-Qualifying
2016	Olympics	Rio de Janeiro		All-around	2nd	35.766	1st	35.749
2016	Olympics	Rio de Janeiro	Vida Carnaval, Bahiana/Batucada, Sambuka by Carlinhos Brown, Inner Sense & Richard Sliwa, Artem Uzunov	5 Ribbons	1st	17.800	1st	17.783
2016	Olympics	Rio de Janeiro	Cementerio Judío, Soleá, La Aurora de Nueva York by Compañía Rafael Amargo, Montse Cortés	6 Clubs / 2 Hoops	5th	17.966	2nd	17.966

Year	Competition Description	Location	Music	Apparatus	Rank	Score-Final	Rank	Score-Qualifying
2012	Olympics	London		All-around	4th	54.950	5th	54.550
2012	Olympics	London	Red Violin Remix (Aranjuez) by Ikuko Kawai	5 Balls	5th	27.400	5th	27.150
2012	Olympics	London	Malagueña by Stanley Black And His Orchestra, Placido Domingo	3 Ribbons / 2 Hoops	3rd	27.550	3rd	27.400
