= Artemi Gavezou =

Spanish rhythmic gymnast

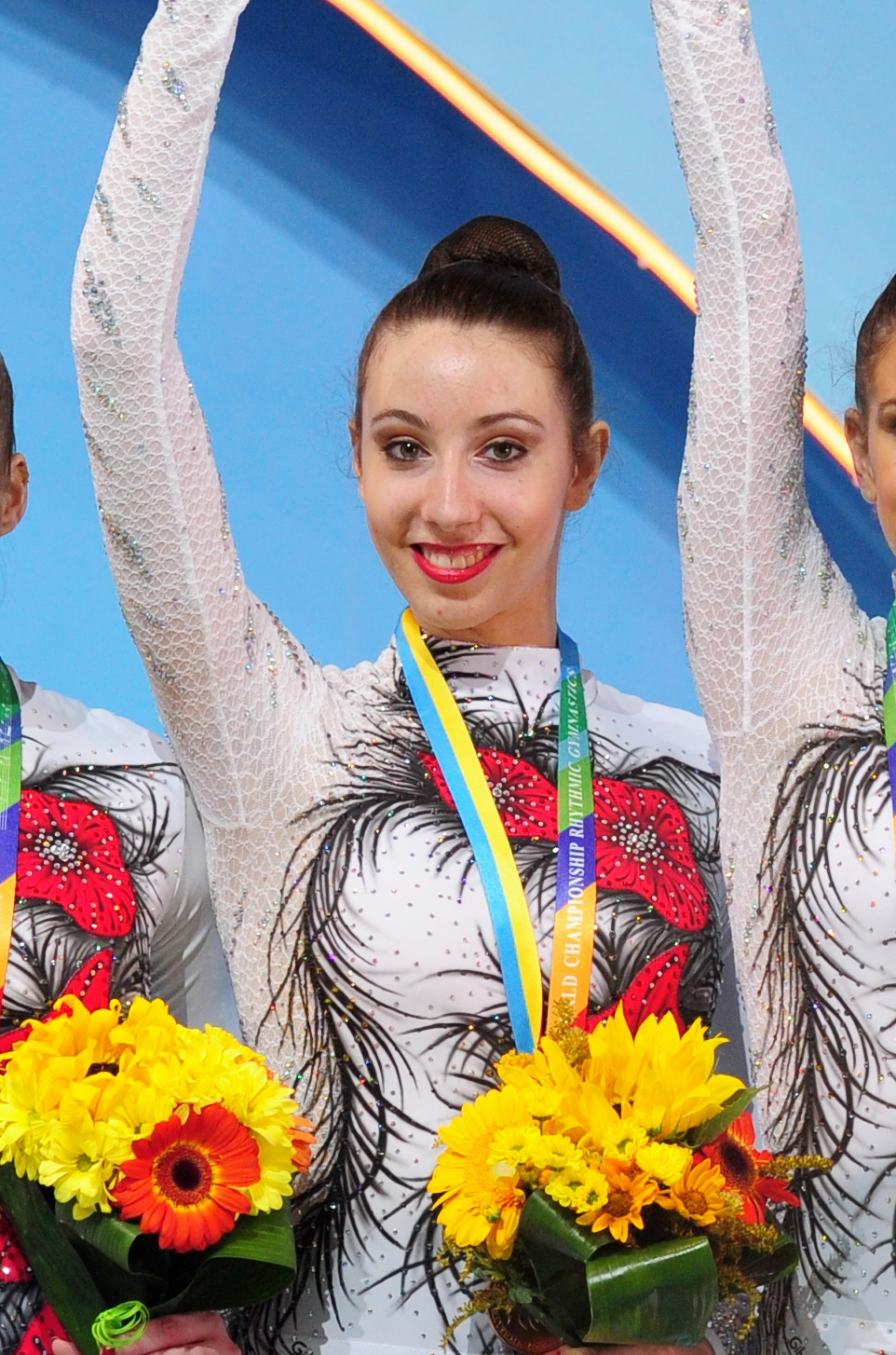

Personal information
- Full name: Artemi Gavezou Castro
- Born: 19 June 1994 (age 32) Thessaloniki, Greece

Gymnastics career
- Discipline: Rhythmic gymnastics
- Country represented: Spain (2013-2016)
- Former countries represented: Greece
- Head coach: Anna Baranova
- Assistant coach: Sara Bayón
- Retired: Yes
Medal record
Representing Spain
Group Rhythmic Gymnastics
Olympic Games
Silver medal – second place	2016 Rio de Janeiro	Group All-around
World Championships
Gold medal – first place	2014 Izmir	10 Clubs
Gold medal – first place	2013 Kiev	10 Clubs
Bronze medal – third place	2013 Kiev	3 Balls/2 Ribbons
Bronze medal – third place	2015 Stuttgart	Group All-around
European Championships
Silver medal – second place	2016 Holon	6 Clubs/2 Hoops
Bronze medal – third place	2014 Baku	10 clubs
Bronze medal – third place	2016 Holon	5 Ribbons

Artemi Gavezou Castro (born 19 June 1994 in Thessaloniki, Greece) is a former group rhythmic gymnast who also represented Spain.

== Career ==
Gavezou was born in Thessaloniki. Until 2013, she lived in Greece, where she trained and competed with the Greek team for almost 13 years. In 2013, she moved to Spain to study, where she has resided permanently.

She competed in world championships, including the 2015 World Rhythmic Gymnastics Championships where she won the bronze medal in the all-around event. She participated in the 2015 European Games in Baku.

Gavezou competed in the 2016 Summer Olympics in Rio de Janeiro, Brazil, where she was a member of the Spanish group (together with Elena López, Sandra Aguilar, Lourdes Mohedano, Alejandra Quereda) that won silver medal in group all–around.

== Detailed Olympic results ==
Year	Competition Description	Location	Music	Apparatus	Rank	Score-Final	Rank	Score-Qualifying
2016	Olympics	Rio de Janeiro		All-around	2nd	35.766	1st	35.749
2016	Olympics	Rio de Janeiro	Vida Carnaval, Bahiana/Batucada, Sambuka by Carlinhos Brown, Inner Sense & Richard Sliwa, Artem Uzunov	5 Ribbons	1st	17.800	1st	17.783
2016	Olympics	Rio de Janeiro	Cementerio Judío, Soleá, La Aurora de Nueva York by Compañía Rafael Amargo, Montse Cortés	6 Clubs / 2 Hoops	5th	17.966	2nd	17.966

== See also ==
- Nationality changes in gymnastics
