= Sandra Aguilar =

Spanish rhythmic gymnast (born 1992)

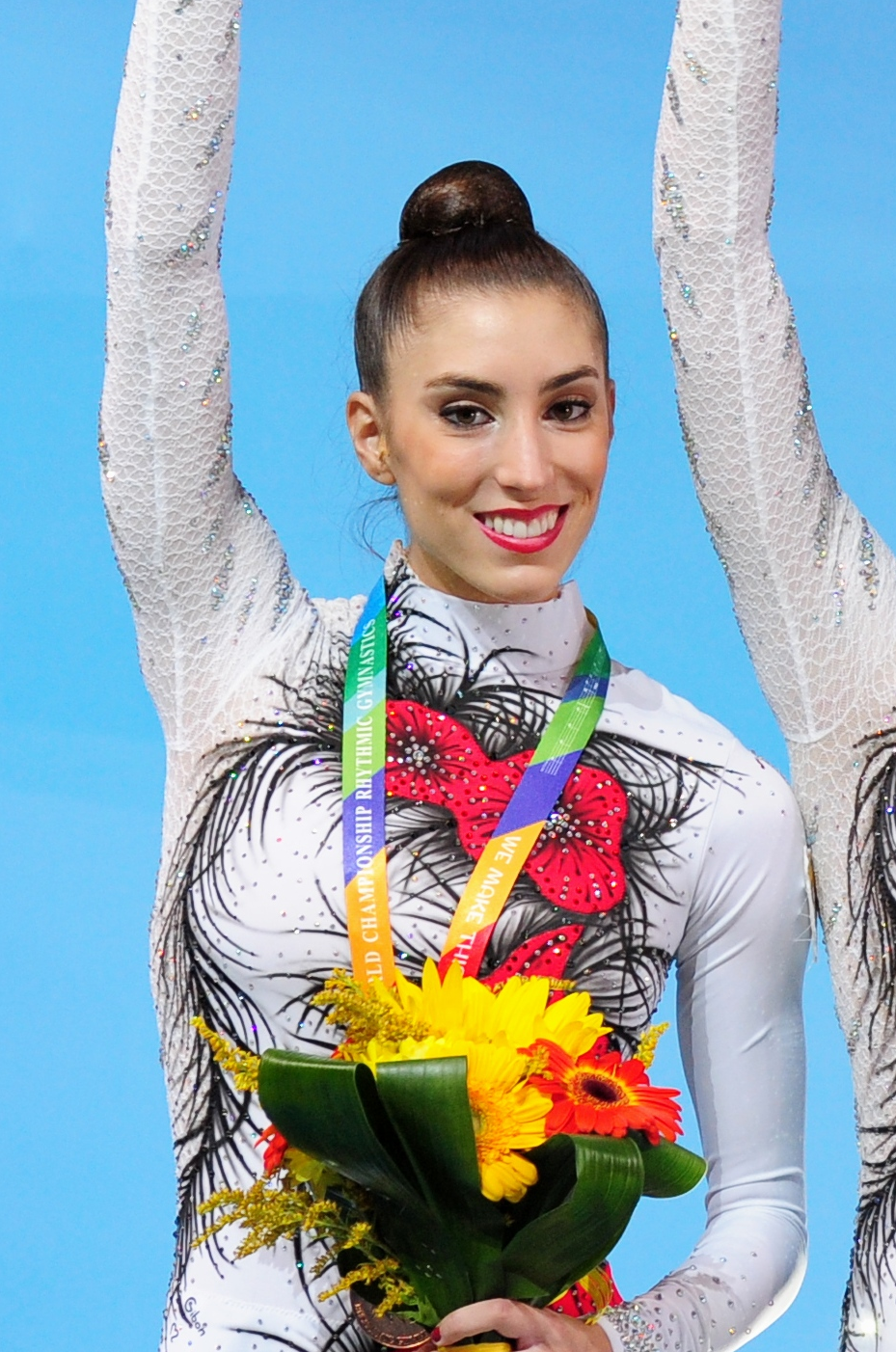

Personal information
- Full name: Sandra Aguilar Navarro
- Born: 9 August 1992 (age 34) Madrid, Spain

Gymnastics career
- Discipline: Rhythmic gymnastics
- Country represented: Spain; (2011-2016)
- Retired: yes
Medal record
Representing Spain
Group Rhythmic Gymnastics
Olympic Games
Silver medal – second place	2016 Rio de Janeiro	Group All-around
World Championships
Gold medal – first place	2014 Izmir	10 Clubs
Gold medal – first place	2013 Kiev	10 Clubs
Bronze medal – third place	2013 Kiev	3 Balls/2 Ribbons
Bronze medal – third place	2015 Stuttgart	Group All-around
European Championships
Silver medal – second place	2016 Holon	6 Clubs/2 Hoops
Bronze medal – third place	2014 Baku	10 clubs
Bronze medal – third place	2016 Holon	5 Ribbons

Sandra Aguilar Navarro (born 9 August 1992 in Madrid) is a Spanish group rhythmic gymnast.

== Career ==
Sandra Aguilar represents her nation at international competitions. She participated at the 2012 Summer Olympics. She competed at world championships, including at the 2013 World Rhythmic Gymnastics Championships winning the gold medal in the 10 clubs event and the bronze medal in the 3 Balls + 2 Ribbons event. and at the 2015 World Rhythmic Gymnastics Championships where she won the bronze medal in the all-around event.

Aguilar competed at the 2016 Summer Olympics in Rio de Janeiro, Brazil where she was member of the Spanish group (together with Elena López, Artemi Gavezou, Lourdes Mohedano, Alejandra Quereda) that won silver medal in group-all around.

== Detailed Olympic results ==
Year	Competition Description	Location	Music	Apparatus	Rank	Score-Final	Rank	Score-Qualifying
2016	Olympics	Rio de Janeiro		All-around	2nd	35.766	1st	35.749
2016	Olympics	Rio de Janeiro	Vida Carnaval, Bahiana/Batucada, Sambuka by Carlinhos Brown, Inner Sense & Richard Sliwa, Artem Uzunov	5 Ribbons	1st	17.800	1st	17.783
2016	Olympics	Rio de Janeiro	Cementerio Judío, Soleá, La Aurora de Nueva York by Compañía Rafael Amargo, Montse Cortés	6 Clubs / 2 Hoops	5th	17.966	2nd	17.966

Year	Competition Description	Location	Music	Apparatus	Rank	Score-Final	Rank	Score-Qualifying
2012	Olympics	London		All-around	4th	54.950	5th	54.550
2012	Olympics	London	Red Violin Remix (Aranjuez) by Ikuko Kawai	5 Balls	5th	27.400	5th	27.150
2012	Olympics	London	Malagueña by Stanley Black And His Orchestra, Placido Domingo	3 Ribbons / 2 Hoops	3rd	27.550	3rd	27.400
