= Carolina Malchair =

Spanish rhythmic gymnast

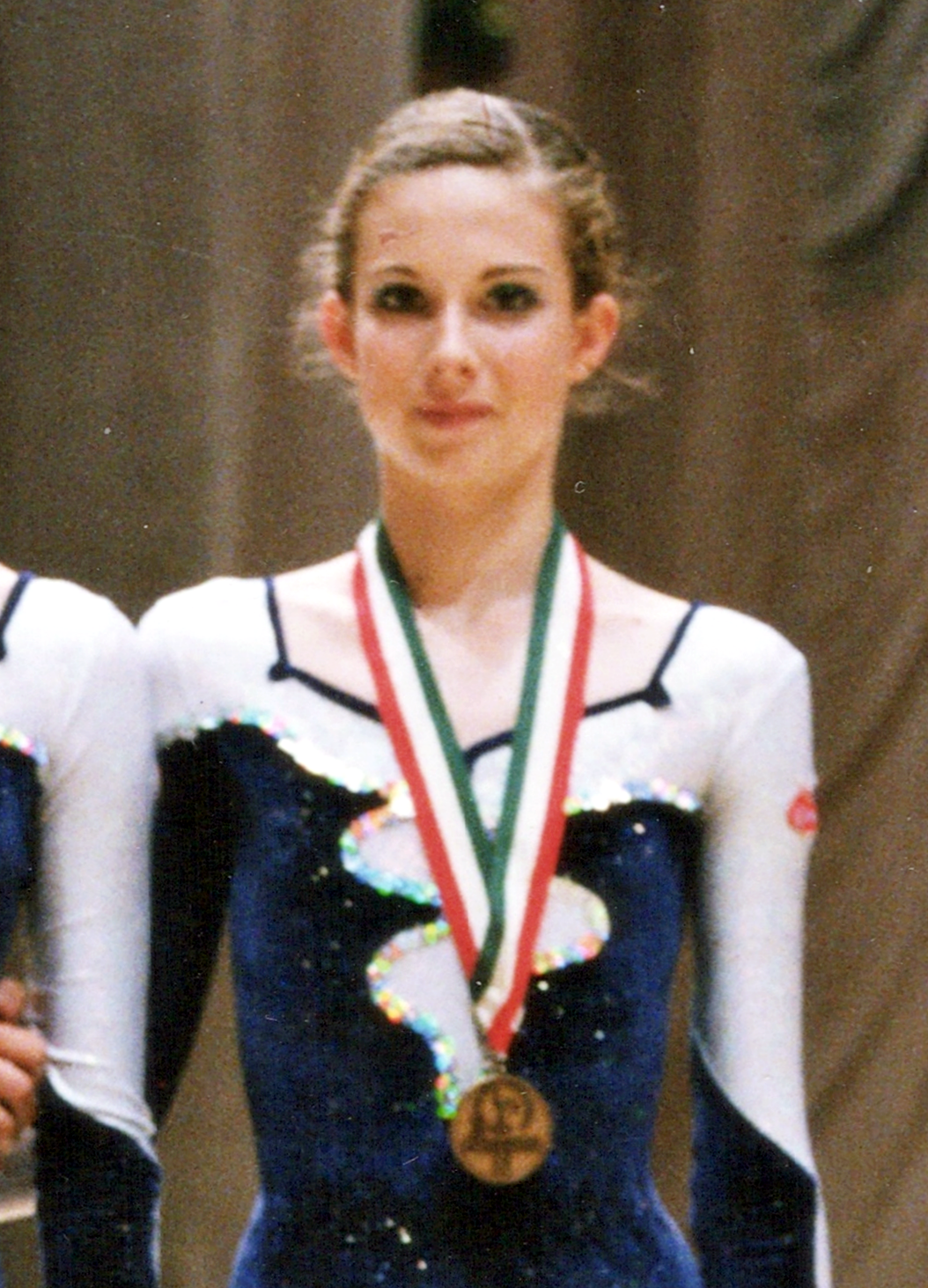

Personal information
- Full name: Carolina Malchair Selecque
- Nationality: Spanish
- Born: 31 May 1982 (age 43); Marbella, Spain

Sport
- Sport: Rhythmic gymnastics

Carolina Malchair Selecque (Note: In this Spanish name, the first or paternal surname is Malchair and the second or maternal family name is Selecque.) (born 31 May 1982) is a Spanish rhythmic gymnast, born in Marbella. She competed at the 2000 Summer Olympics in Sydney.
