= Ikuko Kawai =

Japanese violinist (born 1968)

Ikuko Kawai 川井郁子
- Born: January 19, 1968 (age 58); Takamatsu, Japan
- Genres: Classical crossover, electronic, instrumental
- Occupations: Composer, violinist
- Instrument: Violin
- Years active: 2000–present
- Website: ikukokawai.com

Ikuko Kawai (Japanese: 川井郁子, Hepburn: Kawai Ikuko; born January 19, 1968, Takamatsu) is a classically trained Japanese violinist and composer.

== Early life and education ==
Among Kawai's favorite childhood memories are going to the cinema with her father Kiyoshi; she was captivated by film's soundtracks. She took music lessons in Marugame City and later attended Tokyo University of the Arts for her Bachelor's and graduate degrees. She also attended the Vienna Conservatory of Music.

== Career ==
Kawai has performed both in Japan and internationally, including with the New Japan Philharmonic Orchestra and the Warsaw Philharmonic Orchestra. She performed at Carnegie Hall in New York City in 2008 and at the Paris Opera House in 2015. In March 2019, she performed The Tale of Genji to open the National Cherry Blossom Festival in Washington D.C. Kawai has appeared alongside and collaborated with musicians and artists such as Tsutomu Sekine, Manami Konishi, Miyu Sakihi, Jun Shibuki, Akinori Nakagawa, Masafumi Akikawa, Myung-whun Chung, José Carreras, and Gipsy Kings.

Kawai incorporates Japanese instruments, including the shakuhachi, biwa, shō, taiko drums, hichiriki, and koto, into her music. She has performed on a number of unique and rare instruments, including on the world's first glass violin (2008), on a 1715 Stradivarius owned by the University of Osaka (2021), and on a violin crafted by Francesco Rugeri. In addition to performing, she teaches at Osaka University.

Kawai composed for the films Torokko (2009), Trolley (2010), A Chorus of Angels (2016), and Midnight Bus (2017); her music is also used as the theme song for Awaiting Kirin. In 2016, she won the Japan Academy Prize for Outstanding Music for Junji Sakamoto's film A Chorus of Angels. In 2022, she provided music for the drama Yakumo Tachi at the Izutsu Costume Series along with Seigo Yoshii.

She appeared on TV Tokyo's miniseries 100 Years of Music and in 2016 in the documentary Kanojo no Debut 15th Anniversary Commemoration, Japanese Violin Music Journey Beginning in Paris on Nippon BS Broadcasting. In December 2021, to celebrate the 20th anniversary of Red Violin, her first release, Kawai wrote, directed, produced, and composed the musical The Day Embraced by the Moon / Prologue which brings together Marie Antoinette and Gracia Hosokawa. It was performed at the Umeda Arts Theater in Tokyo. In 2022, she formed the Japanese-Western mixed orchestra Hibiki. Additionally, she hosts the Tokyo FM radio show Ikuko Kawai Unframed.

Kawai's songs are popular performance music among professional ice skaters: Tatiana Volosozhar and Maxim Trankov performed to "Violin Muse" at the 2013 European Figure Skating Championships; Yuzuru Hanyu skated to her song "White Legend" at the 2014 Sochi Olympics; Nam Nguyen performed to "White Legend" at 2021 Skate America; Naoki Rossi skated to her music at the 2023 World Junior Figure Skating Championships; and Shun Sato performed to "Red Violin" at the 2023 International Challenge Cup.

== Personal life ==
Kawai is the single mother of a daughter, Kanon, who appeared with her onstage for the first time in The Day Embraced by the Moon / Prologue as young Gracia Hosokawa. In 2015, Kawai was appointed a Goodwill Ambassador for the All Japan Shrines and Temples Tourism Association. She is also a supporter of the United Nations High Commissioner for Refugees.

== Discography ==
- 2000: The Red Violin
- 2001: Violin Muse
- 2002: Instinct
- 2004: Aurora
- 2005: Wuthering Heights
- 2006: La Japonaese
- 2007: The Violin Muse: The Best of Ikuko Kawai
- 2008: The New World
- 2009: Ikuko Kawai in Zankel Hall at Carnegie Hall 2008～The New World～
- 2009: Nature
- 2009: Appassionato
- 2010: Reborn
- 2014: The Melody～100年の音楽～
- 2015: Violin on Ice: Ikuko Kawai Best
- 2016: Link: The Best of Ikuko Kawai
- 2017: Luna
- 2021: Always～名曲物語～
- 2023: 響 -Hibiki- (in Orchestra Hibiki)
- 2025: IK Best
