= Sara Salarrullana =

Spanish former rhythmic gymnast

- Full name: Sara Salarrullana Martín
- Born: 5 October 2001 (age 24) Madrid, Spain

Gymnastics career
- Discipline: Rhythmic gymnastics
- Country represented: Spain; (2016-2020)
- Club: Club Gimnasia Ritmica Barajas
- Head coach: Anna Baranova
- Assistant coach: Sara Bayón
- Former coach: Ana María Pelaz
- Retired: yes
Medal record
Rhythmic Gymnastics
Representing Spain
Event	1st	2nd	3rd
FIG World Cup	0	0	1
Total	0	0	1

Sara Salarrullana (born 5 October 2001) is a former Spanish rhythmic gymnast who competed with the national group of Spain.

== Career ==
Salarrullana took up rhythmic gymnastics at the Barajas Club in Madrid.

=== Junior ===
She entered the national junior team towards the beginning of 2016, going on to train under Ana María Pelaz at the CAR in Madrid and receiving an external scholarship at the end of the year. On July 23, 2016, Sara made two exhibitions with the junior Spanish ensemble at the 20th Anniversary Gala of the gold medal in Atlanta '96, held in Badajoz. Subsequently, in September the ensemble made exhibitions during the Week European Sports Conference held at the Plaza de Colón and at the Glamor Sport Summit in Madrid, and in October, at the open days of the CAR in Madrid and at the Ciudad de Tarragona International Tournament.

=== Senior ===
In 2017 Sara became a starter gymnast of the senior Spanish group under the orders of Anna Baranova and Sara Bayón. On March 25, she made her debut as a team starter at the Thiais Grand Prix. In this competition the team was 8th overall and 4th in the final of 3 balls and 2 ropes. In April they competed in the World Cup events in Pesaro 18th in the All-Around, Tashkent 9th place in the All-Around and 6th in the balls and ropes final, and Baku 7th in the All-Around, 7th in the 5 hoops final and 5th in the ropes and balls final. On May 14, Sara got her first official international medal, by winning bronze in the 5 hoops final at the Portimão World Cup. In All-Around, the team was 4th, the same position it achieved in the final of 3 balls and 2 ropes. The team in that competition was made up of Sara, Mónica Alonso, Victoria Cuadrillero, Clara Esquerdo, Lía Rovira and Ana Gayán. From the Guadalajara World Cup the Spanish team was made up of Sara, Mónica Alonso, Victoria Cuadrillero]], Clara Esquerdo, Alba Polo and Lia Rovira. In the All-Around they finished in 6th and in the final of the mixed exercise of ropes and balls they finished in 8th. From August 11 to 13 they participated in the last World Cup before the World Championships, held in Kazan, Russia. There, the team got the 5th position in the All-Around and the 8th position in the two apparatus finals. In September, the members of the group disputed the Pesaro World Championship. In the mixed exercises, they scored 16.150, and 14.500 with 5 hoops after two apparatus drops, which meant that they placed 15th overall and that they could not qualify for any apparatus final.

In March 2018 the team began the season in the City of Desio Trophy, playing a bilateral meet with Italy in which they won silver. A foot injury to Clara Esquerdo in mid March meant that the team was unable to participate in the Thiais Grand Prix and Esquerdo was unable to compete in the Sofia World Cup, where the group was 10th in the All-Around. In April, they returned to competition at the World Cup in Pesaro, where the team placed 6th overall, 8th in hoops and 7th in mixed finals, while in May, at the World Cup in Guadalajara, they ranked 10th place overall and 6th in the final of 3 balls and 2 ropes. At the beginning of June, they participated in the European Championship in Guadalajara, the first European Championship held in Spain since 2002. They took 5th place in the All-Around and 6th in both the hoops and mixed finals. At the end of August, he competed in the World Cup in Minsk, where she finished 6th overall, 7th in hoops and 6th in mixed. A week later, at the World Cup event in Kazan, they placed 10th in the All-Around and 7th with 5 hoops. In mid September the group participated the World Championships in Sofia. In the 5 hoops exercise they obtained a score of 14.450 after several apparatus drops, while in the mixed routines they achieved a score of 19.150, which placed them in 20th place overall. In the 3 balls and 2 ropes final they took 8th place with 19,800. The team was formed in this championship by Salarrullana, Mónica Alonso, Victoria Cuadrillero, Clara Esquerdo, Alba Polo and Ana Gayán.

At the beginning of March 2019, the team began the season at the Diputación de Málaga International Tournament in Marbella, achieving bronze. After an exhibition in Corbeil-Essonnes, they participated in the Grand Prix de Thiais, obtaining 10th place overall and 6th in 3 hoops and 4 clubs. In April they achieved 10th and 12th place overall at the World Cup events in Pesaro and Baku respectively. In May, at the World Cup in Guadalajara, they were 4th in the All-Around, 7th with 5 balls and 4th in the mixed routine. After several preparatory competitions, in September they disputed the World Championships in Baku, being able to obtain only 17th place in the All-Around and not achieving the Olympic place. The team was formed in this championship by Sara, Victoria Cuadrillero, Clara Esquerdo, Alba Polo, Emma Reyes and Ana Gayán.

On July 3, 2020, the Royal Spanish Gymnastics Federation announced through its website the gymnast's decision to retire. Salarrullana said goodbye to the team and the fans through their social networks on July 11.
