= Mónica Alonso =

Spanish rhythmic gymnast

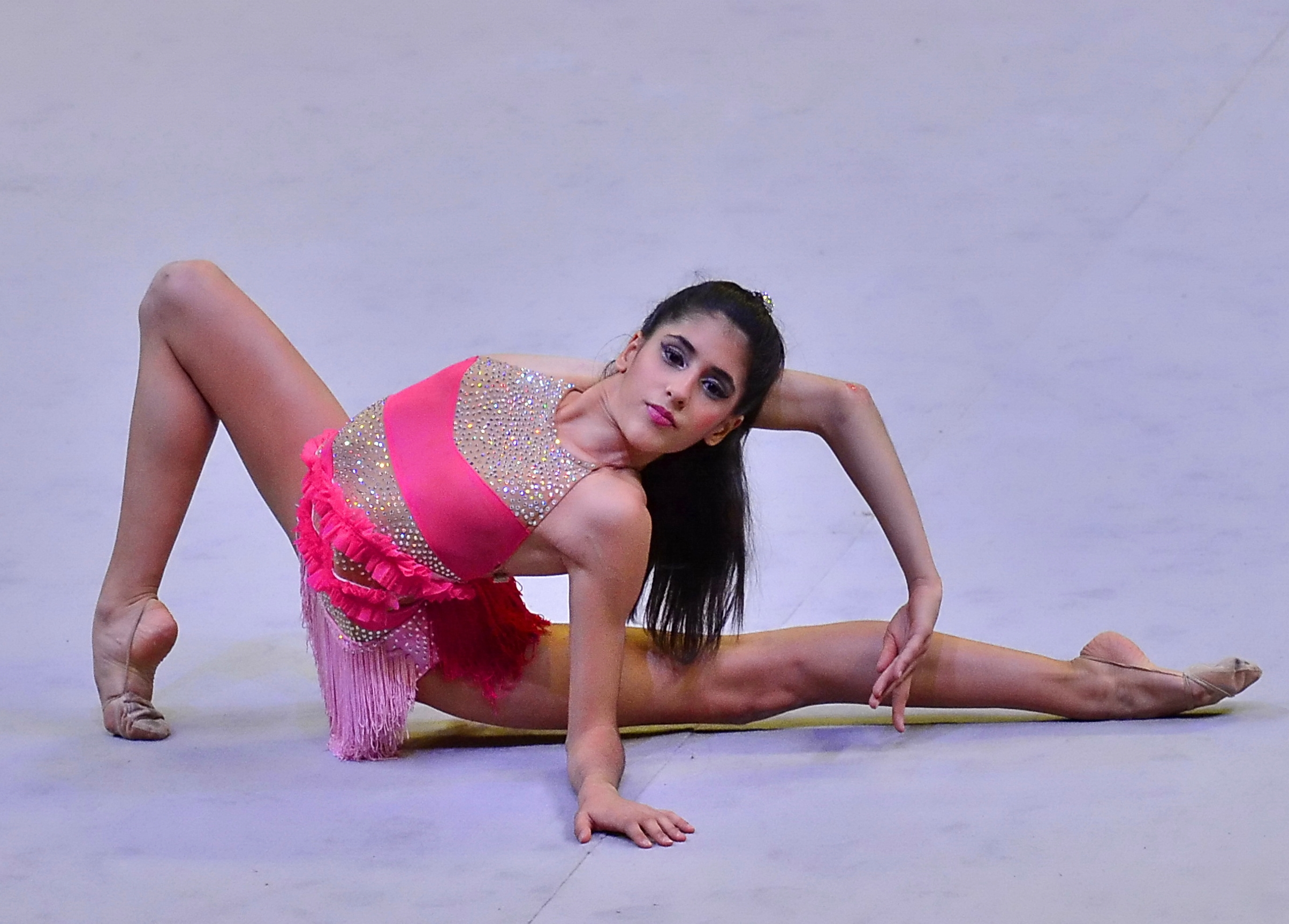

Personal information
- Full name: Mónica Alonso Cendrero
- Nickname: Moni
- Born: 19 May 1998 (age 28) Alcalá de Henares, Spain
- Height: 164 cm (5 ft 5 in)

Gymnastics career
- Discipline: Rhythmic gymnastics
- Country represented: Spain (2015-2019)
- Club: Club Distrito III
- Head coach: Anna Baranova
- Assistant coach: Sara Bayón
- Former coaches: Olga Hinojosa, Ruth Fernández
Medal record
Rhythmic Gymnastics
Representing Spain
Event	1st	2nd	3rd
FIG World Cup	0	0	1
Total	0	0	1

Mónica Alonso (born 19 May 1998) is a Spanish former rhythmic gymnast who was a member of Spain’s national group. In 2012 she was the national junior champion.

== Personal life ==
Alonso was born in the Madrid town of Alcalá de Henares, she has two brothers, her being the middle one. Her cousin Celia Pascual Alonso competes in aerobic gymnastics. At age 9, in 2007, she entered the club C.G.R. District III, where she was trained by Olga Hinojosa. Her first participation in an Individual Spanish Championship was in 2009, where she was runner-up in the pre-junior category. By 2010 she began to be a gymnast in follow-up for the national team.

== Career ==
=== Junior ===
In 2012 she became Spain's national champion in junior category, also winning gold in the four finals. That same year she was selected to participate as a substitute gymnast in the 2012 European Rhythmic Gymnastics Championship in Nizhny Novgorod. In 2013, was the vice national champion and won silver in three finals. He participated in the Euskalgym Gala of 2014.

=== Senior ===
In May 2014 she was selected, along with Polina Berezina, to represent Spain as a senior individual in the Corbeil-Essonnes World Cup, where she competed for the first time as a member of the national team, finishing 45th in the All-Around. That same year she was awarded a scholarship from the Royal Spanish Federation of Gymnastics to be included within the sports program of the CSD. Although Monica had the option of training in the High Performance Center of San Cugat or in the CEARD of León, she chose the latter. As of September 2014, he went on to train at CEARD under the orders of Ruth Fernández, along with other international individual gymnasts of the team, such as Carolina Rodríguez, Sara Llana and Andrea Pozo.

In April 2015, Alonso competed at the Copa de la Reina in Guadalajara, where she won bronze in team, hoop and ball, and silver with clubs. In June of that year, in the Spanish Clubs and Autonomies Championship in Pontevedra, together with her teammates from Club Distrito III Mónica won the bronze in the senior teams competition, thus it was promoted in the first category. In addition, she won silver in the same championship along with the clubs of Torrejón and Alcobendas Chamartín. In the Individual Championship of Spain also in Pontevedra, she was 5th in the All-Around, won silver with final ball and bronze with hoop.

On October 5, 2015 it was confirmed that Alonso was incorporated into the senior Spanish team in the CAR of Madrid under the orders of Anna Baranova and Sara Bayón, training with the successful generation of gymnasts known as the Equipaso. On July 23, 2016, Mónica made two exhibitions with the Spanish junior team at the 20th Anniversary Gala of the Gold Medal in Atlanta '96, held in Badajoz. Subsequently, in September the group held exhibitions during the European Week of Sport held in the Plaza de Colón in Madrid and at the Glamour Sport Summit in Madrid, and in October, in the open days of the CAR of Madrid and in the International Tournament City of Tarragona.

In 2017, she became a full-time gymnast for the senior Spanish group. This year she would usually be a starter in both routines. On 25 March, he made his debut as at the Thiais Grand Prix. In this competition the team was 8th overall and 4th in the 3 balls + 2 ropes final. In April they competed in the Pesaro World Cup (18th place in the All-Around), the Tashkent World Cup (All-Around 9th place and 6th place in the balls and ropes final), and the Baku World Cup (7th in the All-Around, 7th with 5 hoops and 5th with 3 balls + 2 ropes). On 14 May Alonso won her first official international medal, winning bronze with 5 hoops at the World Cup in Portimão. In the All-Around the team was 4th, the same position they achieved in the 3 balls + 2 ropes final. The team consisted of Mónica, Victoria Cuadrillero, Clara Esquerdo, Ana Gayán, Lía Rovira and Sara Salarrullana. Since the Guadalajara World Cup the Spanish team was formed by Mónica, Victoria Cuadrillero, Clara Esquerdo, Ana Gayán, Alba Polo and Lía Rovira. In the All-Around they finished in 6th and in the final of the mixed routine they finished in 8th. From 11 to 13 August they participated in the last World Cup before the World Championship, held in Kazan, Russia. There, the team got the 5th position in the All-Around and the 8th position in the 5 hoops final and the mixed routine. On 2 September, the team participated in World Championship in Pesaro, their first World Championship. In the 3 + 2 routine they scored 16,150, and 14,500 with 5 hoops after two drops of apparatus, which placed them in the 15th position in the All-Around and did not qualify for apparatus finals.

In March 2018, the team began the season at the City of Desio Trophy, disputing a bilateral match with Italy in which they won silver. An injury to Clara Esquerdo’s foot in mid-March meant that the team could not participate in the Grand Prix de Thiais. She then competed in the World Cup in Sofia, ranking 10th overall. In mid-April, at the Pesaro World Cup, the team was 6th All-Around, 8th with 5 hoops and 7th with 3 hoops + 2 ropes, while in May, at the Guadalajara World Cup they were 10th in the All-Around and 6th 3 balls + 2 ropes. In early June Alonso participated in the Guadalajara European Championship, the first European Championship held in Spain since 2002. In the same they finished 5th in the All-Around and 6th in both event finals. In late August she competed in the Minsk World Cup event, where they placed 6th overall, 7th with 5 hoops and 6th in the mixed routine. A week later, in the Kazan World Cup event, they took All-Around 10th place and 7th place with 5 hoops. In mid-September the team participated at the World Championship in Sofia. In the exercise with 5 hoops they scored 14,450 after several drops of apparatus, while in the mixed routine they scored 19,150, which placed them in the 20th in the All-Around. In the 3 + 2 final they finished in 8th place with 19,800. The group in this championship was formed by Alonso, Victoria Cuadrillero, Clara Esquerdo, Ana Gayán, Alba Polo and Sara Salarrullana.

On 27 September 2018, she underwent surgery at the Cemtro Clinic in Madrid. Doctors Manuel Leyes and Tomás Roca performed an arthroscopy on her right foot, intervening a trigonum that irritated the flexor hallucis longus muscle. The recovery time was estimated to be about three months.

=== Retirement ===
On 29 May 2019, the RFEG officially announced her retirement alongside gymnasts Lía Rovira and Tania Kaute.

== Routine music information ==
Year	Apparatus	Music Title
2009	Ball	"Susanita"/"Mi barba tiene tres pelos" by Los Payasos de la Tele and "Vamos a la cama" by Familia Telerín
2011	Ball	"Largo [Harpsichord Concerto No. 5 in F minor BWV 1056]" by The Swingle Singers
2012	Ball	"Largo [Harpsichord Concerto No. 5 in F minor BWV 1056]" by The Swingle Singers
2012	Clubs	"Nel blu dipinto di blu" by Gipsy Kings
2012	Ribbon	"I Will Survive" by Gloria Gaynor
2012	Gala	"Nel blu dipinto di blu" by Gipsy Kings
2013	Ball	"Padam, padam..." by Édith Piaf
2014	Hoop	"La foule" by Édith Piaf
2014	Ball	"Ave María" by Naoko Terai
2014	Ribbon	"Czardas" by Ekaterina Tsvetaeva, "Diamonds Are a Girl's Best Friend" by Marilyn Monroe and Christina Aguilera "Carnaval de París" by Dario G
2014	Gala	"Déjame verte" by Diego Martín and El sueño de Morfeo
2015	Hoop	"La foule" by Édith Piaf
2015	Ball	"Twinkle Lullaby" by The Piano Guys
2016	6 hoops at 20th Anniversary Gold Medal Gala of Atlanta '96	"America" by Leonard Bernstein / "I Got Rhythm" & "Embraceable You" by George Gershwin
2016	Freehand at 20th Anniversary Gold Medal Gala of Atlanta '96	"Canción del toreador" by Georges Bizet
2017	5 hoops (group)	"Torn (Redux)" by Nathan Lanier
2017	3 balls + 2 ropes	"Agua que va a caer" & "Oriza" by Ismael Rivera and Rafael Cortijo / "Aquí el que baila gana" by Fania All-Stars / "Para gozar" by Samba Squad
2018	5 hoops	"Final" & "A ciegas" by Miguel Poveda
2018	3 balls + 2 ropes	"Kairos" by Derek Hough & Lindsey Stirling
