= Ana Gayán =

Spanish former rhythmic gymnast

- Full name: Ana Gayán Bakri
- Born: 22 May 2000 (age 26) Valencia, Spain

Gymnastics career
- Discipline: Rhythmic gymnastics
- Country represented: Spain
- Club: Club Puzol / Club Margaix
- Head coaches: Alejandra Quereda, Ana María Pelaz
- Former coaches: Anna Baranova, Sara Bayón
- Retired: yes
Medal record
Rhythmic Gymnastics
Representing Spain
Event	1st	2nd	3rd
FIG World Cup	0	0	1
Total	0	0	1

Ana Gayán (born 22 May 2000) is a former Spanish rhythmic gymnast who competed with the national group of Spain.

== Personal life ==
Gayán took up the sport at age seven at Club Pucol in Valencia. She then switched to rhythmic gymnastics because she did not like ballet. Her idols are the girls of the Spanish group that won Olympic silver in 2016 and Alina Maksymenko. Gayán's ambition was to compete at the 2020 Olympic Games. She was named the 2017 Outstanding Female Athlete of the Year in El Puig. She's currently studying dentistry.

== Career ==
Gayán started at Club Puzol in Valencia, to later move on to Club Margaix. In 2010 Ana participated in her first National Championship in Benidorm, in the alevin category with ball. Since then, she has participated in a National Base Group Championship, four Spanish Individual Championships and three Spanish Group Championships. In February 2014, she was called for the first time by the Royal Spanish Gymnastics Federation, attending several controls and concentrations held at the CAR in Madrid during the year.

=== Junior ===
In September 2014, Gayán was awarded a scholarship by the Royal Spanish Gymnastics Federation to be part of the national junior group, going on to train under the command of Ana María Pelaz at the CAR in Madrid. During the season, Gayán attended several exhibitions, like the Spanish Ensemble Championship in Zaragoza and the tribute to Sara Bayón in Palencia.

In February 2015, the junior team debuted in competition at the Miss Valentine International Tournament held in Tartu, Estonia, where they achieved 4th position in the All-Around and 7th in the apparatus final with 5 balls. At the end of March, the junior team competed in the International Tournament in Lisbon, Portugal, where they again achieved 4th place in the All-Around in addition to winning the bronze medal in the apparatus final. At the beginning of May, they participated the European Championship in Minsk, where they finished in 9th in the All-Around. The junior team was formed this year by Ana, Victoria Cuadrillero, Clara Esquerdo, Alba Polo, Lía Rovira and Alba Sárrias.

On July 23, 2016, Gayán made two exhibitions with the junior Spanish ensemble at the 20th Anniversary Gala of the gold medal in Atlanta '96, held in Badajoz. Subsequently, in September the ensemble made exhibitions during the Week European Sports Conference held at the Plaza de Colón and at the Glamor Sport Summit in Madrid, and in October, at the open days of the CAR in Madrid and at the Ciudad de Tarragona International Tournament.

=== Senior ===
In 2017 she became a starter gymnast of the senior Spanish group under the orders of Anna Baranova and Sara Bayón. On March 25, she made her debut as a team starter at the Thiais Grand Prix. In this competition the team was 8th overall and 4th in the final of 3 balls and 2 ropes. In April they competed in the World Cup events in Pesaro 18th in the All-Around, Tashkent 9th place in the All-Around and 6th in the balls and ropes final, and Baku 7th in the All-Around, 7th in the 5 hoops final and 5th in the ropes and balls final. On May 14, Cuadrillero got her first official international medal, by winning bronze in the 5 hoops final at the Portimão World Cup. In All-Around, the team was 4th, the same position it achieved in the final of 3 balls and 2 ropes. The team in that competition was made up of Ana, Mónica Alonso, Victoria Cuadrillero, Clara Esquerdo, Lía Rovira and Sara Salarrullana. From the Guadalajara World Cup the Spanish team was made up of Ana, Mónica Alonso, Victoria Cuadrillero, Clara Esquerdo, Alba Polo and Lía Rovira. In the All-Around they finished in 6th and in the final of the mixed exercise of ropes and balls they finished in 8th. From August 11 to 13 they participated in the last World Cup before the World Championships, held in Kazan, Russia. There, the team got the 5th position in the All-Around and the 8th position in the two apparatus finals. In September the members of the group disputed the Pesaro World Championship. In the mixed exercise they scored 16.150, and 14.500 with 5 hoops after two apparatus drops, which meant that they placed 15th overall and that they could not qualify for any apparatus final.

In March 2018 the team began the season in the City of Desio Trophy, playing a bilateral meet with Italy in which they won silver. A foot injury to Clara Esquerdo in mid-March meant that the team was unable to participate in the Thiais Grand Prix and Esquerdo was unable to compete in the Sofia World Cup, where the group was 10th in the All-Around. In April, they returned to competition at the World Cup in Pesaro, where the team placed 6th overall, 8th in hoops and 7th in mixed finals, while in May, at the World Cup in Guadalajara, they ranked 10th place overall and 6th in the final of 3 balls and 2 ropes. At the beginning of June, they participated in the European Championship in Guadalajara, the first European Championship held in Spain since 2002. They took 5th place in the All-Around and 6th in both the hoops and mixed finals. At the end of August, he competed in the World Cup in Minsk, where she finished 6th overall, 7th in hoops and 6th in mixed. A week later, at the World Cup event in Kazan, they placed 10th in the All-Around and 7th with 5 hoops. In mid-September the group participated the World Championships in Sofia. In the 5 hoops exercise they obtained a score of 14.450 after several apparatus drops, while in the mixed routines they achieved a score of 19.150, which placed them in 20th place overall. In the 3 balls and 2 ropes final they took 8th place with 19,800. The team was formed in this championship by Gayán, Mónica Alonso, Victoria Cuadrillero, Clara Esquerdo, Alba Polo and Sara Salarrullana.

At the beginning of March 2019, the team began the season at the Diputación de Málaga International Tournament in Marbella, achieving bronze. After an exhibition in Corbeil-Essonnes, they participated in the Grand Prix de Thiais, obtaining 10th place overall and 6th in 3 hoops and 4 clubs. In April they achieved 10th and 12th place overall at the World Cup events in Pesaro and Baku respectively. In May, at the World Cup in Guadalajara, they were 4th in the All-Around, 7th with 5 balls and 4th in the mixed routine. After several preparatory competitions, in September they disputed the World Championships in Baku, being able to obtain only 17th place in the All-Around and not achieving the Olympic place. The team was formed in this championship by Ana, Victoria Cuadrillero, Clara Esquerdo, Alba Polo, Emma Reyes and Sara Salarrullana.

In September 2020, after the previous team didn't meet the expectations set on them, including not qualifying for the 2020 Olympics before, Alejandra Quereda announced a control to create a new group. Of the members of the national group that has been in force since 2017, only Ana Gayán remained. She missed the 2021 European Championships because of a fracture of the fibula, where Spain finished 9th missing the last ticket for Tokyo that went to Ukraine. In October Ana participated in the World Championships along with Ines Bergua, Valeria Márquez, Mireia Martínez, Uma Mendez and Patricia Pérez, In 2021 Ana participated in the World Championships along Inés Bergua, Valeria Marquéz, Patricia Pérez, Uma Mendez and Mireia Martínez, finishing 12th in the All-Around and 5th in the 3 hoops + 4 clubs' final.

After having suffered from injuries in the start of 2022, on July 8 it was announce that Ana has voluntarily decided to end her sports career.
