= Uma Mendez =

Spanish rhythmic gymnast (born 2004)

- Full name: Uma Mendez Gonzalez
- Born: 7 September 2004 (age 21) Roses, Girona, Spain

Gymnastics career
- Discipline: Rhythmic gymnastics
- Country represented: Spain; (2019-)
- Club: CGR Figueres
- Head coach: Alejandra Quereda
- Assistant coach: Ana María Pelaz

Uma Mendez Gonzalez (born 7 September 2004) is a Spanish rhythmic gymnast, member of the national group.

== Career ==
=== Junior ===
Uma was part of the Spanish junior group that competed at both the 2019 European where she was 7th in teams and in the All-Around, 4th with 5 ribbons and 7th with 5 hoops, and World Championships ending 7th in teams, 5th in the All-Around and with 5 hoops, 4th with 5 ribbons

=== Senior ===
In 2021 Mendez participated in the World Championships along Inés Bergues, Ana Gayán, Valeria Márquez, Patricia Pérez and Mireia Martínez, finishing 12th in the All-Around and 5th in the 3 hoops + 4 clubs' final.

In October 2022 she was confirmed into the national team, taking part in the team presentation for the next season. In January 2023 Uma was selected for the national team's training camp in Gran Canaria along Patricia Pérez, Irene Martínez, Valeria Márquez, Inés Bergua, Mireia Martínez, Andrea Fernández, Nerea Moreno, Salma Solaun, Ana Arnau and individuals Polina Berezina, Lucía González, Alba Bautista and Teresa Golospe.
