= Ángela Corao =

Spanish former rhythmic gymnast

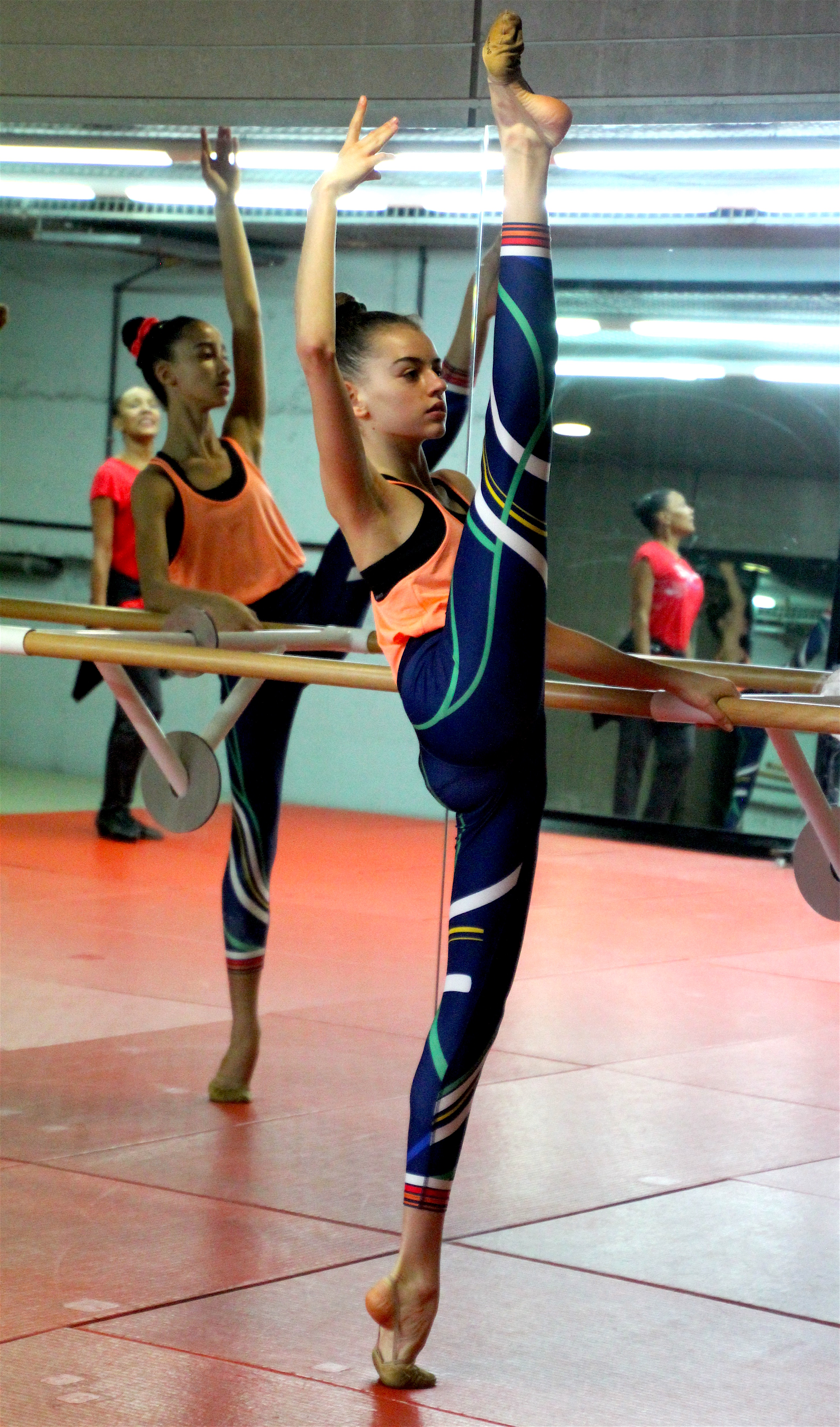

Personal information
- Full name: Ángela Corao Vázquez
- Born: 13 January 2002 (age 24) Oviedo, Spain

Gymnastics career
- Discipline: Rhythmic gymnastics
- Country represented: Spain; (2016-2020)
- Club: Club Rítmica La Corredoria
- Head coach: Anna Baranova
- Assistant coach: Sara Bayón
- Former coach: Ana María Pelaz

Ángela Corao Vázquez (born 13 January 2002) is a Spanish rhythmic gymnast who competed with the national group of Spain.

== Career ==
Ángela started in rhythmic gymnastics at the age of 11 at the La Corredoria Rhythmic Club in Oviedo. At the beginning of 2016 she was selected after several days of recruitment for the national team in the CAR of Madrid.

=== Junior ===
Corao entered the national junior group in October 2016, going on to train under the orders of Ana María Pelaz in the CAR of Madrid. In April 2017 she debuted with the group at the Città di Pesaro International Tournament, obtaining the 19th place. That same month she made an exhibition with the junior team at the Corbeil-Essonnes International Tournament, and in May, the team competed at the Portimão International Tournament, where they were the only participants in their category. At the European Championship, which was held from May 19 to 21 in Budapest, they ranked 20th in qualification. The junior team was made up that year by Ángela, Marta Bosch, Emma Reyes, Tania Kaute, Judith Prades and Marian Navarro.

=== Senior ===
In 2017 Corao began to work in the senior reserve group under the orders of Anna Baranova and Sara Bayón, although, due to her age, it was not until 2019 when she officially began to be part of the senior category.

At the beginning of March 2019, the team began the season at the Diputación de Málaga International Tournament in Marbella, achieving bronze. After an exhibition in Corbeil-Essonnes, they participated in the Grand Prix de Thiais, obtaining 10th place overall and 6th in 3 hoops and 4 clubs. In April they achieved 10th and 12th place overall at the World Cup events in Pesaro and Baku respectively. In May, at the World Cup in Guadalajara, they were 4th in the All-Around, 7th with 5 balls and 4th in the mixed routine.
