= Alba Polo =

Spanish former rhythmic gymnast

- Full name: Alba Polo Álvarez
- Born: 17 May 2001 (age 25) Madrid, Spain

Gymnastics career
- Discipline: Rhythmic gymnastics
- Country represented: Spain (2014-2020)
- Club: Club Vallecas
- Head coach: Anna Baranova
- Assistant coach: Sara Bayón
- Former coach: Ana María Pelaz
- Retired: yes

Alba Polo (born 17 May 2001) is a Spanish former rhythmic gymnast who competed with the national group of Spain.

== Personal life ==
Alba took up gymnastics when she was 7 at the Club Vallecas, her idols are the girls of the Spanish group that won Olympic silver in 2016 and Margarita Mamun, her ambition was to compete at the 2020 Olympic Games. Outside the gym her hobby is going shopping. She speaks Spanish and English.

== Career ==
In 2009 Alba participated in her first group national championships, celebrated in Valladolid, with Club Torrejón performing a free hands routine. From then until 2013 she participated in the national group championships (being 5th the last two years) and competed as an individual at regional level.

=== Junior ===
In 2014 she participated in her first national individual championship, held in Guadalajara, placing among the 25 major junior category with clubs. During that year she was in several control training of the Royal Spanish Federation of Gymnastics until the definitive incorporation on the junior group in September.

=== Junior ===
In September 2014 she was awarded a scholarship by the Royal Spanish Gymnastics Federation to be part of the national junior group, going on to train under the command of Ana María Pelaz at the CAR in Madrid. During the season she attended several exhibitions, like the Spanish Ensemble Championship in Zaragoza and at the tribute to Sara Bayón in Palencia.

In February 2015 the junior team debuted in competition at the Miss Valentine International Tournament held in Tartu, Estonia, where they achieved 4th position in the All-Around and 7th in the apparatus final with 5 balls. At the end of March they competed in the International Tournament in Lisbon, Portugal, where they again achieved 4th place in the All-Around, in addition to winning the bronze medal in the apparatus final. At the beginning of May they participated in the European Championship in Minsk, where they finished in 9th in the All-Around. The junior team was formed this year by Alba, Clara Esquerdo, Ana Gayán, Victoria Cuadrillero, Lía Rovira and Alba Sárrias.

On July 23, 2016, Victoria made two exhibitions with the junior Spanish ensemble at the 20th Anniversary Gala of the Gold Medal in Atlanta '96, held in Badajoz. Subsequently, in September the ensemble made exhibitions during the Week European Sports Conference held at the Plaza de Colón and at the Glamor Sport Summit in Madrid, and in October, at the open days of the CAR in Madrid and at the Ciudad de Tarragona International Tournament.

=== Senior ===
In 2017 she became a starter gymnast of the senior Spanish group under the orders of Anna Baranova and Sara Bayón. On March 25, she made her debut as a team starter at the Thiais Grand Prix. In this competition the team was 8th overall and 4th in the final of 3 balls and 2 ropes. Alba did not participate as a starter in the next four competitions of the season, which were the World Cups in Pesaro, Tashkent, Baku and Portimão. Her position was taken over by Sara Salarrullana. From the Guadalajara World Cup the Spanish team was made up of Alba, Mónica Alonso, Clara Esquerdo, Ana Gayán, Victoria Cuadrillero and Lía Rovira. In the All-Around they finished in 6th and in the final of the mixed exercise of ropes and balls they finished in 8th. From August 11 to 13 they participated in the last World Cup before the World Championships, held in Kazan, Russia. There, the team got the 5th position in the All-Around and the 8th position in the two apparatus finals. In September the members of the group disputed the Pesaro World Championship. In the mixed exercise they scored 16.150, and 14.500 with 5 hoops after two apparatus drops, which meant that they placed 15th overall and that they could not qualify for any apparatus final.

In March 2018 the team began the season in the City of Desio Trophy, playing a bilateral meet with Italy in which they won silver. An injury to Clara Esquerdo's foot in mid March meant that the team was unable to participate in the Thiais Grand Prix and Esquerdo was unable to compete in the Sofia World Cup, where the group was 10th in the All-Around. In April, they returned to competition at the World Cup in Pesaro, where the team placed 6th overall, 8th in hoops and 7th in mixed finals, while in May, at the World Cup in Guadalajara, they ranked 10th place overall and 6th in the final of 3 balls and 2 ropes. At the beginning of June, they participated in the European Championship in Guadalajara, the first European Championship held in Spain since 2002. They took 5th place in the All-Around and 6th in both the hoops and mixed finals. At the end of August, he competed in the World Cup in Minsk, where she finished 6th overall, 7th in hoops and 6th in mixed. A week later, at the World Cup event in Kazan, they placed 10th in the All-Around and 7th with 5 hoops. In mid September the group participated in the World Championships in Sofia. In the 5 hoops exercise they obtained a score of 14.450 after several apparatus drops, while in the mixed routines they achieved a score of 19.150, which placed them in 20th place overall. In the 3 balls and 2 ropes final they took 8th place with 19,800. The team was formed in this championship by Polo, Mónica Alonso, Clara Esquerdo, Ana Gayán, Victoria Cuadrillero and Sara Salarrullana.

At the beginning of March 2019, the team began the season at the Diputación de Málaga International Tournament in Marbella, achieving bronze. After an exhibition in Corbeil-Essonnes, they participated in the Grand Prix de Thiais, obtaining 10th place overall and 6th in 3 hoops and 4 clubs. In April they achieved 10th and 12th place overall at the World Cup events in Pesaro and Baku respectively. In May, at the World Cup in Guadalajara, they were 4th in the All-Around, 7th with 5 balls and 4th in the mixed routine. After several preparatory competitions, in September they disputed the World Championships in Baku, being able to obtain only 17th place in the All-Around and not achieving the Olympic place. The team was formed in this championship by Polo, Clara Esquerdo, Ana Gayán, Victoria Cuadrillero, Emma Reyes and Sara Salarrullana.

On August 11, 2020, the Royal Spanish Gymnastics Federation announced Polo's decision to retire through its website.
