= Lía Rovira =

Former Spanish rhythmic gymnast

- Full name: Lía Rovira Cuartero
- Born: 17 November 2000 (age 26) Peniscola, Spain

Gymnastics career
- Discipline: Rhythmic gymnastics
- Country represented: Spain; (2014-2019)
- Club: Club Mabel
- Head coach: Anna Baranova
- Assistant coach: Sara Bayón
- Former coach: Ana María Pelaz
- Retired: yes
Medal record
Rhythmic Gymnastics
Representing Spain
Event	1st	2nd	3rd
FIG World Cup	0	0	1
Total	0	0	1

Lía Rovira (born 17 November 2000) is a former Spanish rhythmic gymnast who competed with the national group of Spain.

== Personal life ==
Rovira took up gymnastics at the Club Mabel of Benicarló. Her idol is Evgeniya Kanaeva, her ambition was to compete at the 2020 Olympic Games. Outside the gym her hobbies are reading and watching movies.

== Career ==
Lía's first National Championship was in Benidorm in 2012, participating in the pre junior category with clubs and winning silver.

=== Junior ===
As a junior, in 2013, she was proclaimed national group champion in Granada and was 4th in the team competition at individual nationals in Valladolid. That same year she attended for the first time several trainings held at the CEARD in León. In the individual national championships held in Granada in 2014, she achieved the 5th position in the teams category and was classified among the 10 best gymnasts in the junior category.

=== Junior ===
In September 2014 she was awarded a scholarship by the Royal Spanish Gymnastics Federation to be part of the national junior group, going on to train under the command of Ana María Pelaz at the CAR in Madrid. During the season she attended several exhibitions, like the Spanish Ensemble Championship in Zaragoza and at the tribute to Sara Bayón in Palencia.

In February 2015 the junior team debuted in competition at the Miss Valentine International Tournament held in Tartu, Estonia, where they achieved 4th position in the All-Around and 7th in the apparatus final with 5 balls. At the end of March they competed in the International Tournament in Lisbon, Portugal, where they again achieved 4th place in the All-Around, in addition to winning the bronze medal in the apparatus final. At the beginning of May they participated the European Championship in Minsk, where they finished in 9th in the All-Around. The junior team was formed this year by Ana, Victoria Cuadrillero, Clara Esquerdo, Alba Polo, Lía Rovira and Alba Sárrias.

On July 23, 2016, Gayán made two exhibitions with the junior Spanish ensemble at the 20th Anniversary Gala of the gold medal in Atlanta '96, held in Badajoz. Subsequently, in September the ensemble made exhibitions during the Week European Sports Conference held at the Plaza de Colón and at the Glamor Sport Summit in Madrid, and in October, at the open days of the CAR in Madrid and at the Ciudad de Tarragona International Tournament.

=== Senior ===
In 2017 she became a starter gymnast of the senior Spanish group under the orders of Anna Baranova and Sara Bayón. On March 25, she made her debut as a team starter at the Thiais Grand Prix. In this competition the team was 8th overall and 4th in the final of 3 balls and 2 ropes. In April they competed in the World Cup events in Pesaro 18th in the All-Around, Tashkent 9th place in the All-Around and 6th in the balls and ropes final, and Baku 7th in the All-Around, 7th in the 5 hoops final and 5th in the ropes and balls final. On May 14, Lía got her first official international medal, by winning bronze in the 5 hoops final at the Portimão World Cup. In All-Around, the team was 4th, the same position it achieved in the final of 3 balls and 2 ropes. The team in that competition was made up of Lía, Mónica Alonso, Victoria Cuadrillero, Clara Esquerdo, Ana Gayán and Sara Salarrullana. From the Guadalajara World Cup the Spanish team was made up of Rovira, Mónica Alonso, Victoria Cuadrillero, Clara Esquerdo, Alba Polo and Ana Gayán. In the All-Around they finished in 6th and in the final of the mixed exercise of ropes and balls they finished in 8th. From August 11 to 13 they participated in the last World Cup before the World Championships, held in Kazan, Russia. There, the team got the 5th position in the All-Around and the 8th position in the two apparatus finals. In September the members of the group disputed the Pesaro World Championship. In the mixed exercise they scored 16.150, and 14.500 with 5 hoops after two apparatus drops, which meant that they placed 15th overall and that they could not qualify for any apparatus final.

In March 2018 the team began the season in the City of Desio Trophy, playing a bilateral meet with Italy in which they won silver. A foot injury to Clara Esquerdo in mid March meant that the team was unable to participate in the Thiais Grand Prix and Esquerdo was unable to compete in the Sofia World Cup, where the group was 10th in the All-Around. In April, they returned to competition at the World Cup in Pesaro, where the team placed 6th overall, 8th in hoops and 7th in mixed finals, while in May, at the World Cup in Guadalajara, they ranked 10th place overall and 6th in the final of 3 balls and 2 ropes. At the beginning of June, they participated in the European Championship in Guadalajara, the first European Championship held in Spain since 2002. They took 5th place in the All-Around and 6th in both the hoops and mixed finals. At the end of August, he competed in the World Cup in Minsk, where she finished 6th overall, 7th in hoops and 6th in mixed. A week later, at the World Cup event in Kazan, they placed 10th in the All-Around and 7th with 5 hoops. In mid September the group participated the World Championships in Sofia. In the 5 hoops exercise they obtained a score of 14.450 after several apparatus drops, while in the mixed routines they achieved a score of 19.150, which placed them in 20th place overall. In the 3 balls and 2 ropes final they took 8th place with 19,800. The team was formed in this championship by Rovira, Mónica Alonso, Victoria Cuadrillero, Clara Esquerdo, Alba Polo and Sara Salarrullana.

On 29 May 2019, the Royal Spanish Gymnastics Federation officially announced her retirement alongside gymnasts Mónica Alonso and Tania Kaute.
