= Victoria Cuadrillero =

Spanish former rhythmic gymnast

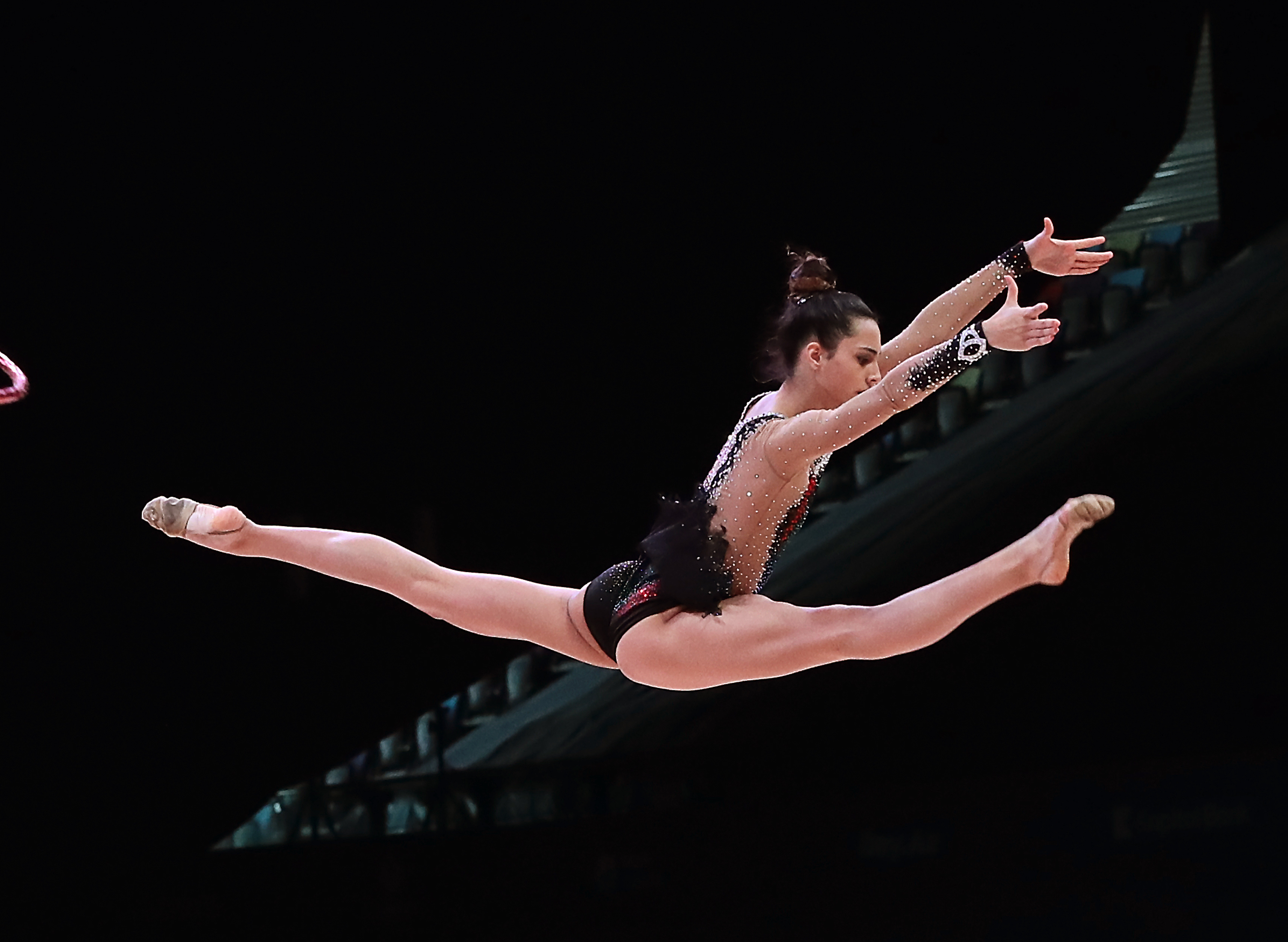

Personal information
- Full name: Victoria Cuadrillero Redondo
- Born: 6 July 2000 (age 26) Guadarrama, Spain

Gymnastics career
- Discipline: Rhythmic gymnastics
- Country represented: Spain; (2014-2019)
- Club: Club Sierra Madrid
- Head coach: Anna Baranova
- Assistant coach: Sara Bayón
- Former coach: Ana María Pelaz
Medal record
Rhythmic Gymnastics
Representing Spain
Event	1st	2nd	3rd
FIG World Cup	0	0	1
Total	0	0	1

Victoria Cuadrillero (born 6 July 2000) is a Spanish former rhythmic gymnast who competed with the national group of Spain.

== Personal life ==
Daughter of Juan Manuel Cuadrillero, Victoria took up gymnastics at age 7. Her idols are the girls of the Spanish group that won Olympic silver in 2016 and Yana Kudryavtseva, her ambition was to compete at the 2020 Olympic Games. Outside the gym her hobbies are studying, music, watching videos. She's currently pursuing a degree in criminology.

== Career ==
Cuadrillero started in the Municipal Sports Center of Guadarrama under the orders of Celia Benayas, training around four and a half hours per week. In 2014, with a national license from the Sierra Club of Madrid, she participated in the Individual Base National Championship held in Guadalajara with the ribbon exercise, forming part of the cadet category. That same year she attended several concentrations of the Royal Spanish Federation of Gymnastics in the facilities of the CAR in Madrid (Consejo Superior de Deportes) with a view to being part of the junior team that would represent Spain in the 2015 European Championship.

=== Junior ===
In September 2014 she was awarded a scholarship by the Royal Spanish Gymnastics Federation to be part of the national junior group, going on to train under the command of Ana María Pelaz at the CAR in Madrid. During the season she attended several exhibitions, like the Spanish Ensemble Championship in Zaragoza and at the tribute to Sara Bayón in Palencia.

In February 2015 the junior team debuted in competition at the Miss Valentine International Tournament held in Tartu, Estonia, where they achieved 4th position in the All-Around and 7th in the apparatus final with 5 balls. At the end of March they competed in the International Tournament in Lisbon, Portugal, where they again achieved 4th place in the All-Around, in addition to winning the bronze medal in the apparatus final. At the beginning of May they participated in the European Championship in Minsk, where they finished in 9th in the All-Around. The junior team was formed this year by Victoria, Clara Esquerdo, Ana Gayán, Alba Polo, Lía Rovira and Alba Sárrias.

On July 23, 2016, Victoria made two exhibitions with the junior Spanish ensemble at the 20th Anniversary Gala of the Gold Medal in Atlanta '96, held in Badajoz. Subsequently, in September the ensemble made exhibitions during the Week European Sports Conference held at the Plaza de Colón and at the Glamor Sport Summit in Madrid, and in October, at the open days of the CAR in Madrid and at the Ciudad de Tarragona International Tournament.

=== Senior ===
In 2017 she became a starter gymnast of the senior Spanish group under the orders of Anna Baranova and Sara Bayón. On March 25, she made her debut as a team starter at the Thiais Grand Prix. In this competition the team was 8th overall and 4th in the final of 3 balls and 2 ropes. In April they competed in the World Cup events in Pesaro 18th in the All-Around, Tashkent 9th place in the All-Around and 6th in the balls and ropes final, and Baku 7th in the All-Around, 7th in the 5 hoops final and 5th in the ropes and balls final. On May 14, Cuadrillero got her first official international medal, by winning bronze in the 5 hoops final at the Portimão World Cup. In All-Around, the team was 4th, the same position it achieved in the final of 3 balls and 2 ropes. The team in that competition was made up of Victoria, Mónica Alonso, Clara Esquerdo, Ana Gayán, Lía Rovira and Sara Salarrullana. From the Guadalajara World Cup the Spanish team was made up of Victoria, Mónica Alonso, Clara Esquerdo, Ana Gayán, Alba Polo and Lia Rovira. In the All-Around they finished in 6th and in the final of the mixed exercise of ropes and balls they finished in 8th. From August 11 to 13 they participated in the last World Cup before the World Championships, held in Kazan, Russia. There, the team got the 5th position in the All-Around and the 8th position in the two apparatus finals. In September the members of the group disputed the Pesaro World Championship. In the mixed exercise they scored 16.150, and 14.500 with 5 hoops after two apparatus drops, which meant that they placed 15th overall and that they could not qualify for any apparatus final.

In March 2018 the team began the season in the City of Desio Trophy, playing a bilateral meet with Italy in which they won silver. An injury to Clara Esquerdo's foot in mid March meant that the team was unable to participate in the Thiais Grand Prix and Esquerdo was unable to compete in the Sofia World Cup, where the group was 10th in the All-Around. In April, they returned to competition at the World Cup in Pesaro, where the team placed 6th overall, 8th in hoops and 7th in mixed finals, while in May, at the World Cup in Guadalajara, they ranked 10th place overall and 6th in the final of 3 balls and 2 ropes. At the beginning of June, they participated in the European Championship in Guadalajara, the first European Championship held in Spain since 2002. They took 5th place in the All-Around and 6th in both the hoops and mixed finals. At the end of August, he competed in the World Cup in Minsk, where she finished 6th overall, 7th in hoops and 6th in mixed. A week later, at the World Cup event in Kazan, they placed 10th in the All-Around and 7th with 5 hoops. In mid September the group participated in the World Championships in Sofia. In the 5 hoops exercise they obtained a score of 14.450 after several apparatus drops, while in the mixed routines they achieved a score of 19.150, which placed them in 20th place overall. In the 3 balls and 2 ropes final they took 8th place with 19,800. The team was formed in this championship by Cuadrillero, Mónica Alonso, Clara Esquerdo, Ana Gayán, Alba Polo and Sara Salarrullana.

At the beginning of March 2019, the team began the season at the Diputación de Málaga International Tournament in Marbella, achieving bronze. After an exhibition in Corbeil-Essonnes, they participated in the Grand Prix de Thiais, obtaining 10th place overall and 6th in 3 hoops and 4 clubs. In April they achieved 10th and 12th place overall at the World Cup events in Pesaro and Baku respectively. In May, at the World Cup in Guadalajara, they were 4th in the All-Around, 7th with 5 balls and 4th in the mixed routine. After several preparatory competitions, in September they disputed the World Championships in Baku, being able to obtain only 17th place in the All-Around and not achieving the Olympic place. The team was formed in this championship by Cuadrillero, Clara Esquerdo, Ana Gayán, Alba Polo, Emma Reyes and Sara Salarrullana.

In August 2020, Cuadrillero was removed from the senior team after a control carried out between August 12 and 13 by the technical team led by the new coach Alejandra Quereda and by the technical director Isabel Pagán, considering that she did not meet the requirements for continue in the national team. On August 15, the gymnast herself announced through her social networks the decision of the technical team, as well as her withdrawal from gymnastics.
