= Anna Baranova =

Belarusian-Spanish rhythmic gymnastics coach

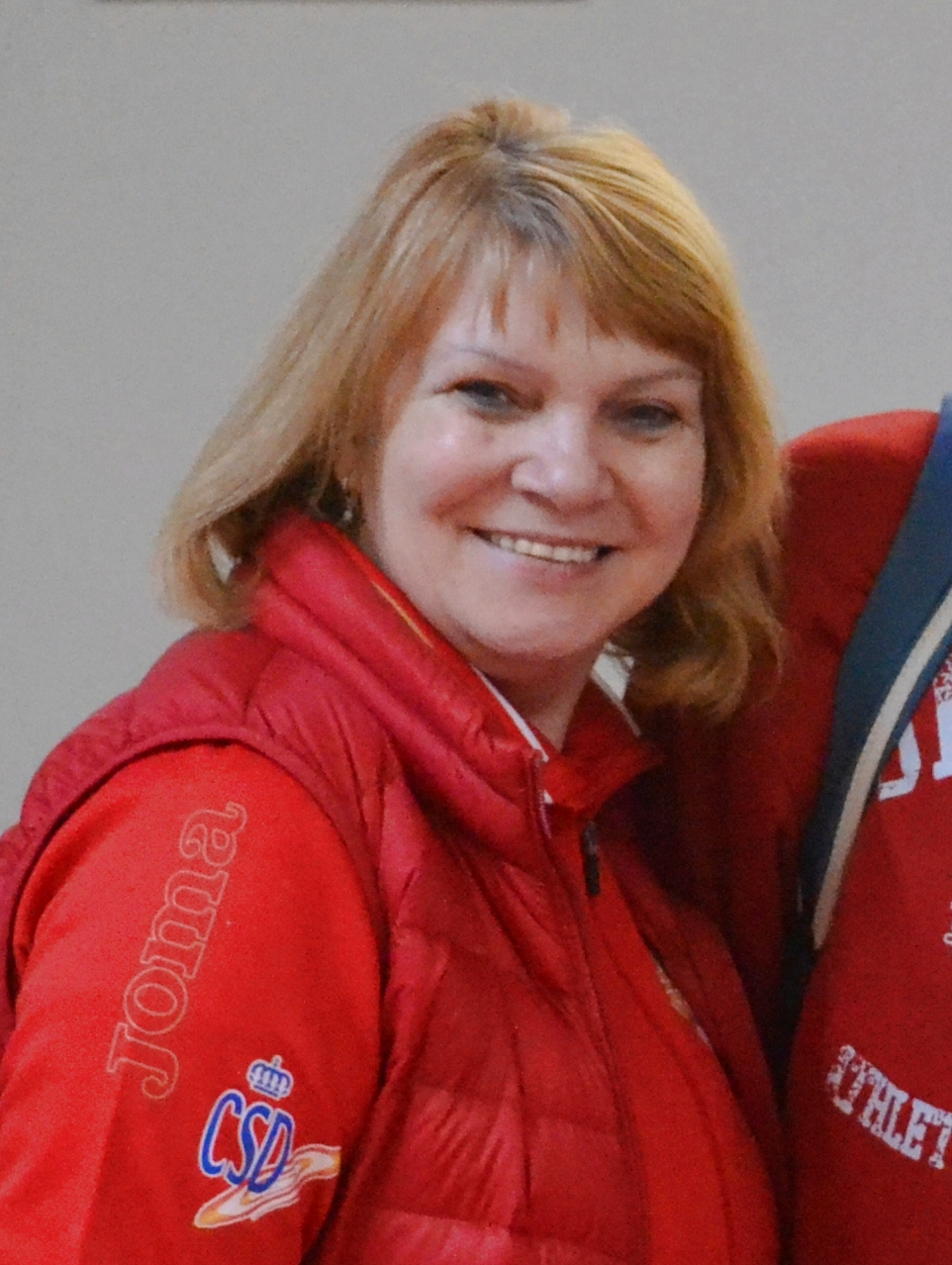
- Born: Belarus
- Citizenship: Belarusian and Spanish
- Occupations: Coach of the Spanish Rhythmic Gymnastics' group 2004–2008 / 2011–2020; Coach of the French Rhythmic Gymnastics' group 2020–present

Anna Baranova is a rhythmic gymnastics coach, former Spanish national coach and current coach of the French national team. She has held the position of coach of the Spanish group in two stages: the first from 2004 to 2008, and the second from 2011 to 2020. In both she had the help as a coach of Sara Bayon. In this period the Spanish team, known as the Equipaso, has won silver at the Olympic Games in Rio 2016, became double world champion in 10 clubs (Kyiv 2013 and Izmir 2014), won world All-Around bronze in 2015 in Stuttgart and finished in 4th place at the 2012 London Olympics.

On June 5, 2015, she was granted Spanish nationality by naturalisation. In 2016 she was awarded with the Bronze Medal of the Royal Order of Sports Merit.

== Biography ==
=== First time as Spanish coach (2004–2008) ===
==== 2004–2008: Beijing Olympic Cycle 2008 ====
After the Spanish federation didn't renew Rosa Menor (coach of the group) nor Tania Nagornaia (coach of the individuals), after the 2004 Summer Olympics, Anna Baranova was chosen by the Royal Spanish Gymnastics Federation to be the head coach of the Spanish rhythmic gymnastics group. He went on to train the Spanish team with Sara Bayón at the Madrid High Performance Centre. In 2005, at the World Championship in Baku, Spain finished in 7th place in the All-Around and in 6th in 3 hoops + 4 clubs' final. The group was formed that year by Bárbara González Oteiza, Lara González, Marta Linares, Isabel Pagán, Ana María Pelaz and Nuria Velasco.

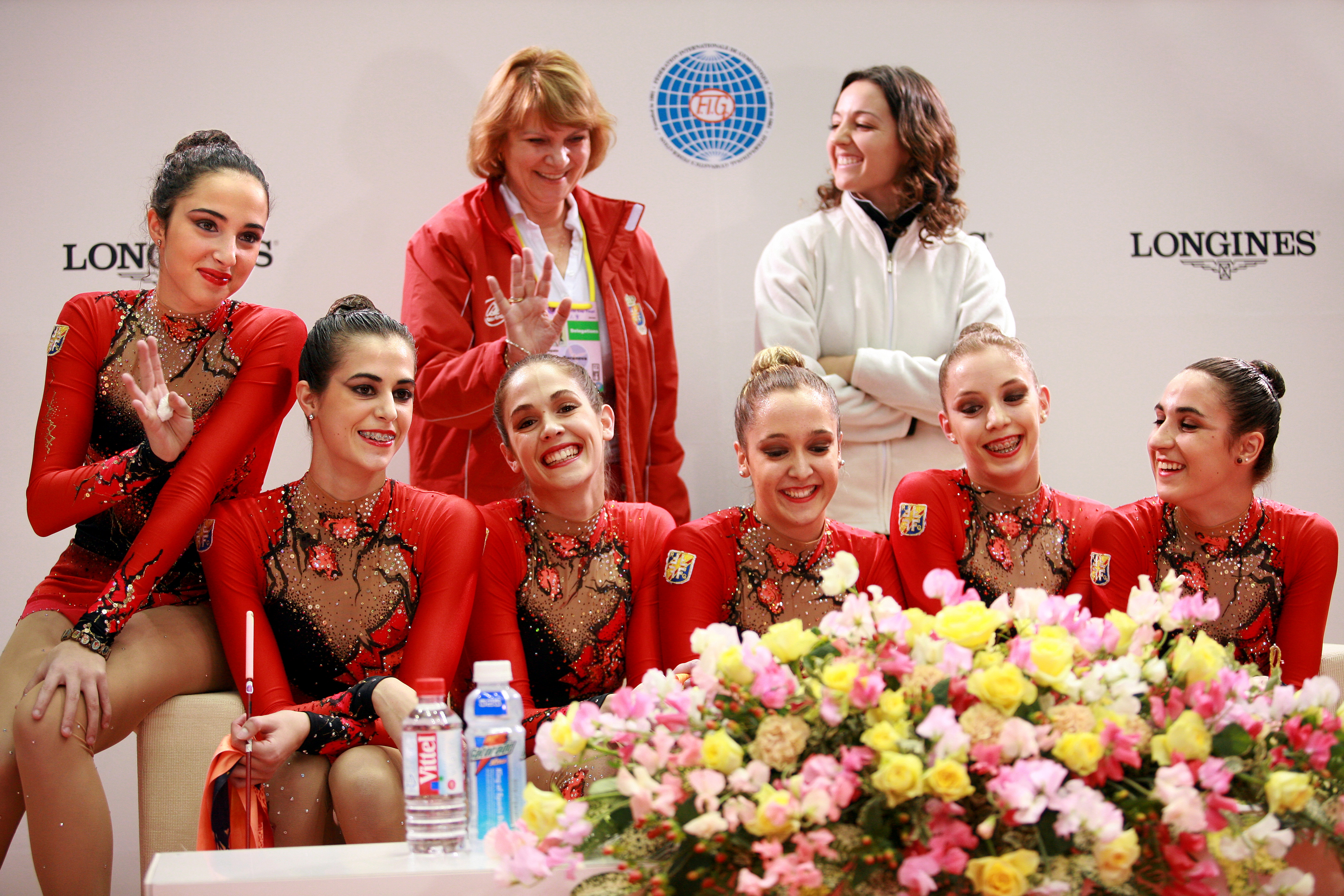
Anna Baranova (standing, waving) with the Spanish team in the World Cup Final in Mie (2006)

At the beginning of March 2006, the Spanish group won 3 silver medals at the Madeira International Tournament. In September 2006, at the World Cup event held in Portimão, the group achieved bronze in 5 ribbons and silver in 3 hoops + 4 clubs, in addition to 5th place in the All-Around. That same month, at the European Championships in Moscow they ended up in 5th place in the All-Around and 5th place in the 5 ribbons final. In November the Spaniards participated in the World Cup Final in Mie, where they got 5th place with 5 ribbons and 8th with 3 hoops + 4 clubs. The team composition was practically the same as the previous year but with Violeta González replacing Marta Linares. In April 2007, at the World Cup held in Portimão, the team was 5th place in the All-Around and 6th in both the 5 ribbons and the 3 hoops + 4 clubs finals. In May the Spanish team won the silver medal both in the All-Around and in the 3 hoops + 4 clubs final of the World Cup held in Nizhny Novgorod, in addition to the 4th place with 5 ribbons. In September of that same year they took part in the Patras World Championship. The team placed 5th in the All-Around, which qualified them for the 2008 Summer Olympics. They also finished 6th with both 5 ribbons and 3 hoops + 4 clubs. In December they competed in the Pre-Olympic in Beijing, obtaining All-Around 8th place. The team was made of Bárbara González Oteiza, Lara González, Isabel Pagán, Ana María Pelaz, Verónica Ruiz and Bet Salom.

For this time, in addition to the holder, in the preparation for the Olympics other gymnasts (then substitutes) such as Sandra Aguilar, Cristina Dassaeva, Sara Garvín, Violeta González and Lidia Redondo were integrated in the team. In June 2008 at the European Championship in Turin, the group finished in 6th place in the All-Around and 4th place in both 5 ribbons and 3 hoops + 4 clubs. In August of that year they participated in the Olympic Games in Beijing, obtaining the 11th position in the qualifying phase after committing several errors in their second routines, 3 hoops and 4 clubs. This made the team unable to get into the Olympic final. That year, at the World Cup in Benidorm, the Spanish team won two silver medals in the 5 ribbon and the 3 hoops and 4 clubs competition. The group was then composed by the same gymnasts who went to Beijing: Bárbara González Oteiza, Lara González, Isabel Pagán, Ana María Pelaz, Verónica Ruiz and Bet Salom.

In October, after the 2008 Summer Olympics, Bulgaria's Efrossina Angelova became the new national coach, replacing Anna Baranova.

=== Second time as Spanish coach (2011–2020) ===
==== 2011–2012: return to the national team and London 2012 ====
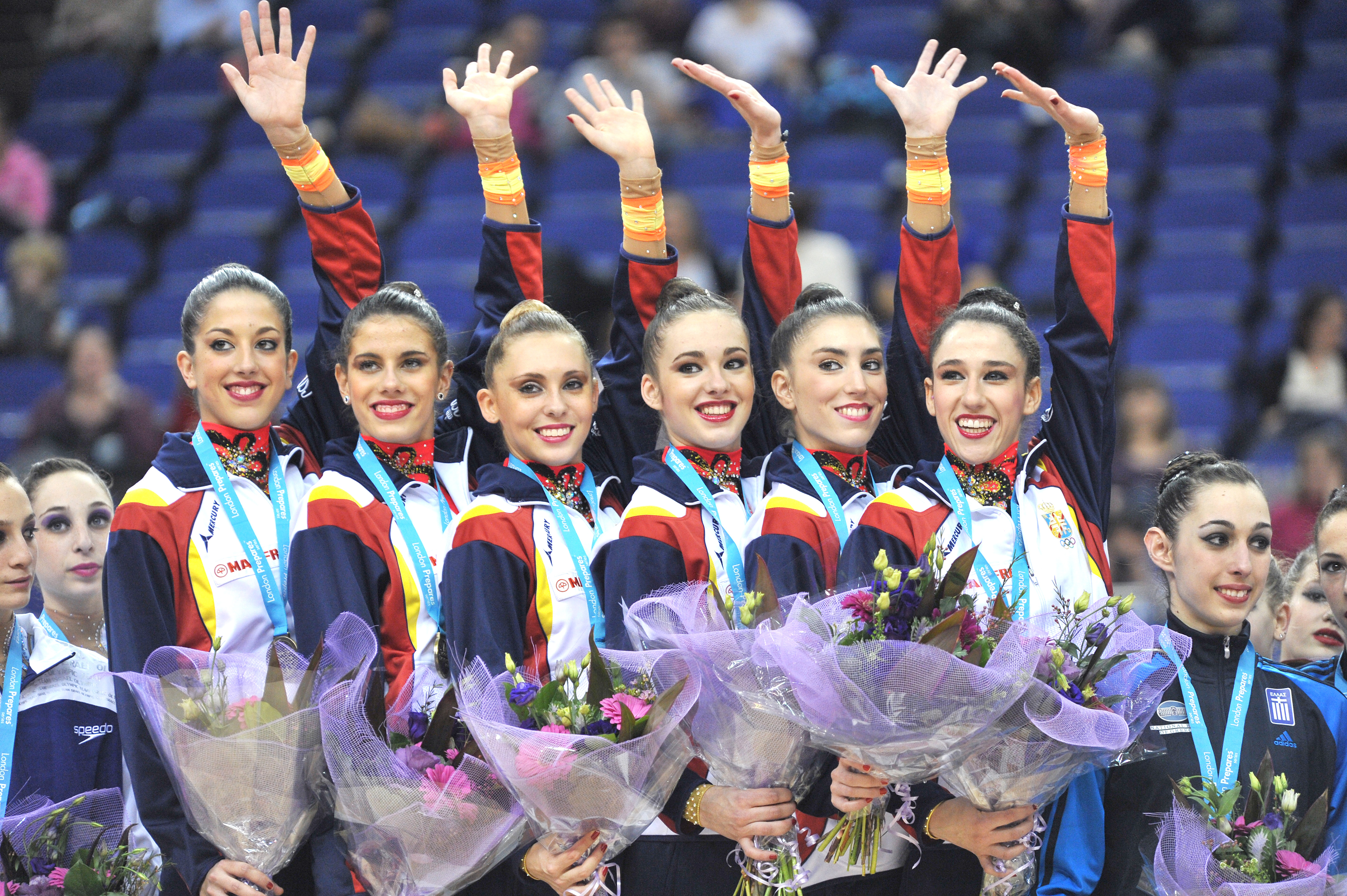
The Spanish team, coached by Anna Baranova and Sara Bayón, on the podium of the Pre-Olympic in London (2012)

In January 2011, after the departure of Angelova, Baranova returned as coach of the Spanish team, again with Sara Bayón as her vice. She was presented as new coach on January 7. At that time the team was three months behind the others in term of preparation, the time interval between the dismissal of Efrossina Angelova (who filed a lawsuit with the Federation for wrongful dismissal) and the hiring of Anna Baranova, Some gymnasts returned to their clubs of origin during this period, although several continued to work on body and apparatus technique with Noelia Fernández waiting for a new coach. With the return of Baranova and Bayón, two new routines were made with the aim of qualifying via that year's World Cup circuit for the London 2012 Olympic Games. The new 5 balls composition was on "Red Violin" by Ikuko Kawai (a theme based on the adage of the Concierto de Aranjuez), while the 3 ribbons 2 hoops used Malagueña by Ernesto Lecuona in Stanley Black And His Orchestra and Plácido Domingo's version. During the 2011 season, the group trained by Baranova and Bayón, and formed by Loreto Achaerandio, Sandra Aguilar, Elena López, Lourdes Mohedano, Alejandra Quereda (captain) and Lidia Redondo, qualified for several finals in World Cup stages, in addition to winning the 3 gold medals at both the US Classics Competition in Orlando and the II Meeting in Vitória Brazil. At the World Championships in Montpellier, France, they didn't qualify directly for the Olympics, as they obtained the 12th position and a place for the Pre-Olympic after a ribbon knot in their 3 ribbons + 2 hoops routine. They also achieved 6th place in the 5 balls final. After the World Championship they continued their training with the aim of finally qualifying for the Games in the pre-Olympic test event. In November they participated in the Euskalgym and in December, in the I International Tournament of Zaragoza, they won the silver medal behind the Russian group.

In January 2012 they participated in the Pre-Olympic event, where they won the gold medal and qualified for the Olympic Games. Spain won a major competition for the first time since Seville 1998 (in which the Spanish group won gold in the 3 ribbons + 2 hoops final). In May, the team won All-Around bronze at the Sofia's World Cup and the gold medal in the final of the mixed routines of ribbons and hoops. In July 2012 the team won the bronze medal in the All-Around of the World Cup event held in Minsk.

Subsequently, Baranova traveled with the team to the London 2012 Olympic Games, her second Olympic experience as the coach of the Spanish group, having also coached the team in Beijing. In the qualifying phase, the Spanish team, composed of Loreto Achaerandio, Sandra Aguilar, Elena López, Lourdes Mohedano, Alejandra Quereda (captain) and Lidia Redondo, finished with 54,550 points (27,150 for 5 balls and 27,400 for 3 ribbons + 2 hoops) who placed them 5th in the All-Around and qualified them for the final. In the Olympic final held at the Wembley Arena, the group first performed with 5 balls that gave them a score of 27,400 points, placing them in 5th position and improving by 0.250 from qualification. In the 3 ribbons + 2 hoops routine they scored 27,550 points, an inquiry for the difficulty score (which was 9,200) was issued, although it was rejected. The two routines gave them a total of 54,950 points, which served to finish the competition in 4th position and obtain the Olympic diploma.

=== 2013–2016: Rio 2016 Olympic cycle ===
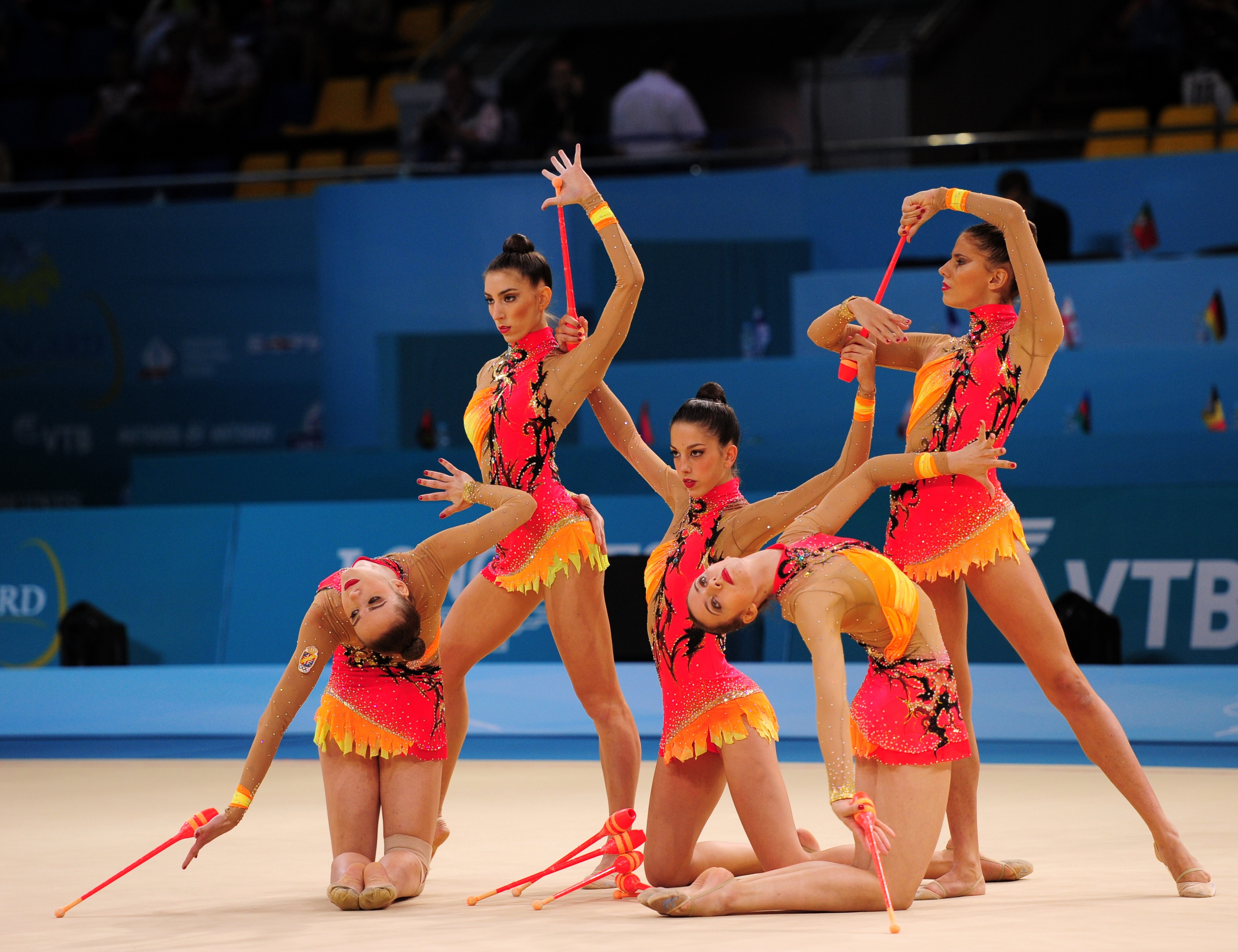
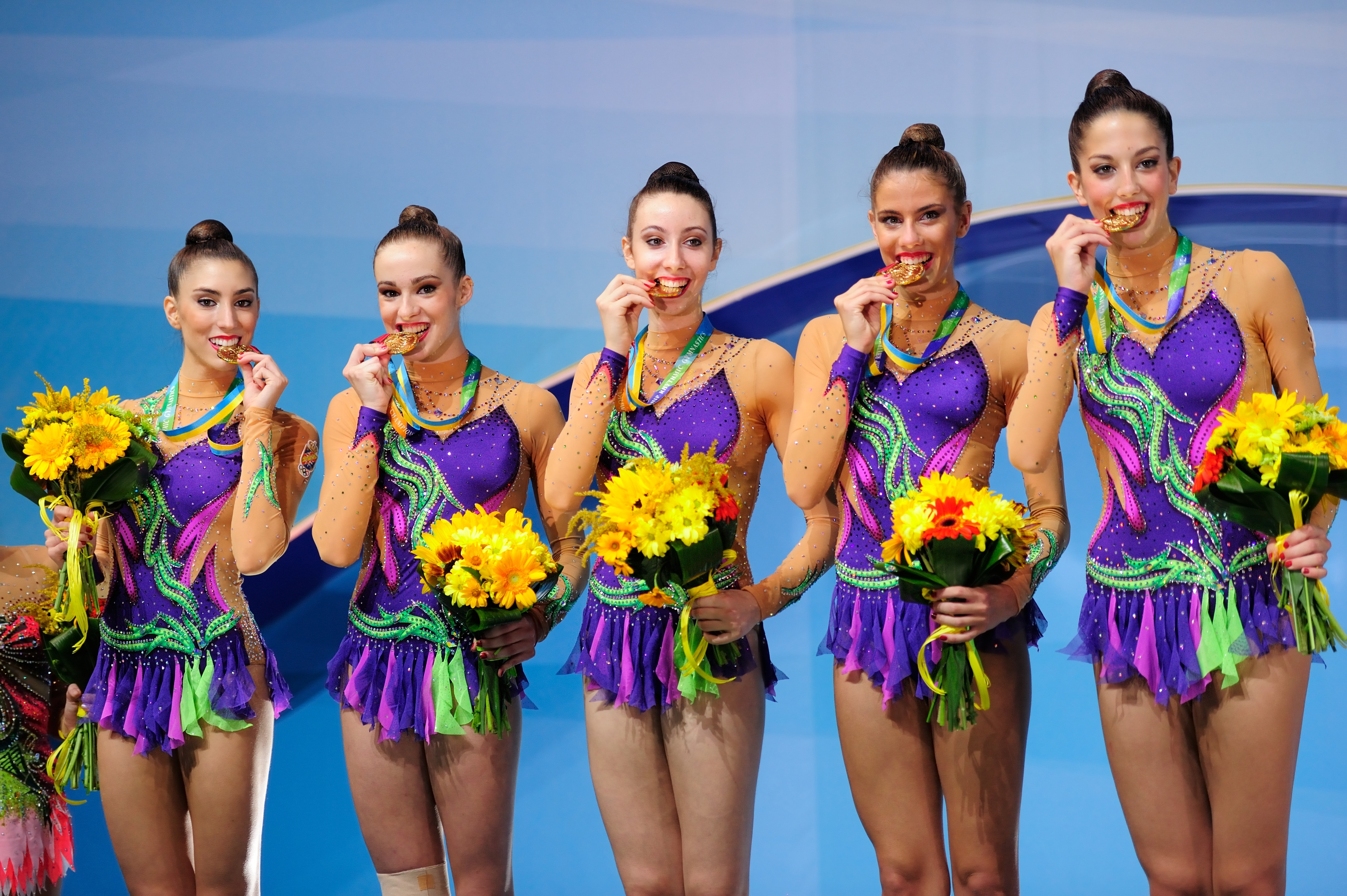

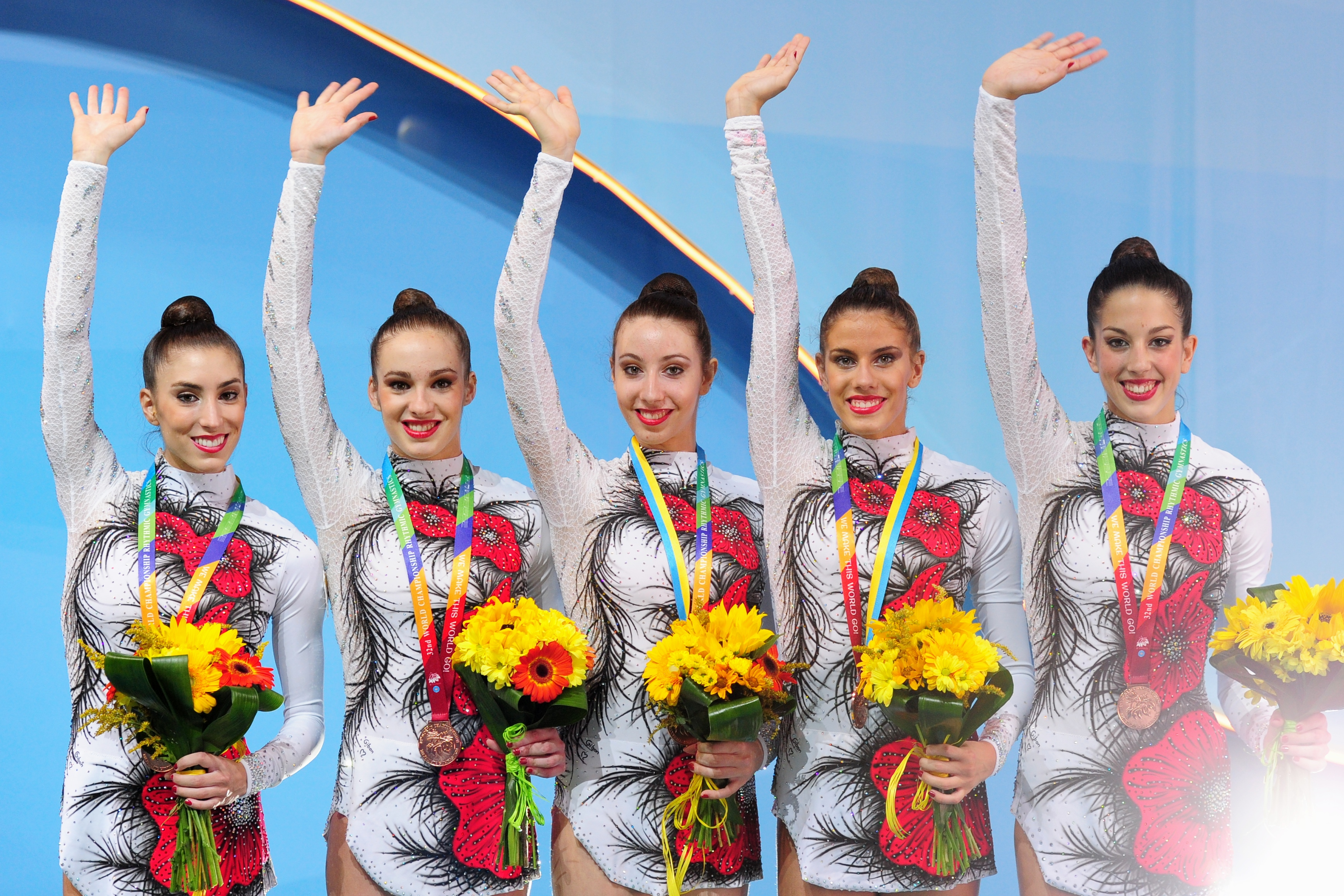
Above: Start of the routine of 10 clubs at the 2013 World Championships. Center: The Spanish team with 10 clubs' gold in Kyiv. Bottom: The team with 3 balls + 2 ribbons' bronze.

==== 2013: first world title as coach in Kiev ====
In 2013 the 10 clubs was on "Blind" by Miguel Poveda, and the 3 balls and 2 ribbons on a mix of "Still", "Big Palooka" and "Jive and Jump" by The Jive Aces. The new members of the team this year were Artemi Gavezou and Marina Fernández (who would retire in August 2013). In April of that year, at the World Cup in Lisbon, they won All-Around gold and bronze with 3 balls and 2 ribbons. Subsequently, they won the silver medal with 10 clubs at the Sofia World Cup and bronze in the All-Around at the Saint Petersburg World Cup.

On 1 September at the World Championship in Kyiv, after being 4th in the All-Around the previous day, the Spanish group won gold with 10 clubs and bronze with 3 balls + 2 ribbons. The clubs' score was 17,350, which gave them the world title ahead of Italy and Ukraine, second and third respectively, while in the mixed final, the score of 17,166 was not enough to oust Belarus, that it was silver, and to Russia, that won gold. The group consisted of Sandra Aguilar, Artemi Gavezou, Elena López, Lourdes Mohedano and Alejandra Quereda. These were the first medals won by Spain in a World Rhythmic Gymnastics Championship since 1998.

After being proclaimed world champions, the gymnasts of the Spanish group made a tour where they participated in several exhibitions, such as those held at the Arnold Classic Europe in Madrid, the Solidarity Gala in favour of the Man Project in Burgos, the Gala of Gymnastics Stars in Mexico, D. F., the Euskalgym in Bilbao, in Lyon, in Conil de la Frontera, in Granada during the Spanish Group Championship, and in Vitoria for the Christmas Gala of the Federation Alavesa of Gymnastics. In addition, they made a calendar whose purpose was to raise money to pay for the next competitions. In 2014, the captain of the group, Alejandra Quereda, asked about the fact that no Spanish television channel broadcast the World Championship in Kiev and about the lack of media at the airport when returning to Spain, replied:

«It shocks you a little the fact that media from other countries support you more than yours [...] After the World Championship we have been invited to make exhibitions in other countries [...] the best was to arrive in Mexico. At the airport we were waiting for the press, televisions, radios... a deployment. And, of course, you think "if we are more famous here than in our country"».

— Alejandra Quereda, 2014 statements to Olympic Planet

==== 2014: European bronze in Baku and second world title in Izmir ====
Several injuries and physical problems of some members of the team, such as Elena Lopez's knee pain or a bone edema in the left ankle of Lourdes Mohedano, delayed the start of the 2014 season. On March 29, 2014, the group participated in an exhibition in Vera, where they premiered the new 3 balls + 2 balls routine on "Intro" and "Mascara" by Violet, in addition to 10 clubs, which had some modifications compared to the previous year. The following week, the same five group members who had been world champions in Kyiv travelled to Lisbon to compete in the World Cup, their first official competition of the season. In Lisbon they won the gold medal in the All-Around, while they won silver in the two apparatus finals. In the last competition before the European Championship, the Minsk World Cup, the girls won All-Around silver, bronze in the final of 3 balls + 2 ribbons, in addition to a 4th place in the final 10 clubs.

In June at the European Championship in Baku, they got the 5th place in the All-Around and then won bronze in the 10 clubs final. The score of 17,550 placed them behind Russia, silver, and Bulgaria, that won gold. In addition they got the 5th place in the final of 3 balls + 2 ribbons. This medal was the first achieved by Spain in a European Rhythmic Gymnastics Championship since 1999. Two days after the Europeans, on June 17, a reception was held for the national team in the CSD to celebrate this achievement. The president of the Royal Spanish Federation of Gymnastics, Jesus Carballo, described the Spanish group as "one of the best teams we have had" and highlighted the value of the medal to be achieved before "countries with much more history and many more resources to be able to take the podiums". Alejandra Quereda, the team captain, pointed out that «"t is a sample of the great moment of form in which we are".

In August a World Cup was held in Sofia, where the Spanish group was 4th in the All-Around, just 0.5 short of bronze, thus falling behind Italy, Bulgaria and Russia that took gold. The next day, they won the bronze medal in the 10 clubs final and 5th place (tied with Ukraine and Belarus) in the 3 balls 2 ribbons final. For this competition Artemi Gavezou, who was recovering from an injury and could not travel, was replaced by Adelina Fominykh in the clubs routine and by Marina Viejo in the mixed one, making it the debut of both with the starting group. That same month, again with Artemi as holder, they participated in the IV Meeting in Vitória, where they achieved silver in the All-Around and in 3 balls + 2 ribbons, and the gold medal in the 10 clubs final. At the beginning of September at the World Cup event in Kazan, the members of the Spanish team took bronze in the All-Around, the 4th place in the 3 balls and 2 ribbons final, and the 8th place with 10 clubs.

At the World Championships in Izmir, several drops and an out of borders in the 3 balls + 2 ribbons routine, made the Spanish group finish in 11th place in the All-Around, managing to qualify only for the 10 clubs final. The following day, on 28 September, the Spanish team managed to win the gold medal in the 10 clubs final for the second consecutive year. The score was 17,433, which gave the Spanish the world title ahead of Israel and Belarus, second and third respectively. The team was made up of the same members who also won the gold medal in Kyiv the previous year: Sandra Aguilar, Artemi Gavezou, Elena López, Lourdes Mohedano and Alejandra Quereda.

After being proclaimed world champions for the second time, in October the team traveled to the LG Whisen Rhythmic All Stars 2014, held in Seoul, South Korea, where they performed the mixed exercise and participated in an exhibition. On 20 December 2014, the Spanish team participated in the tribute, in Palencia, to their coach Sara Bayón, performing two exhibitions. The recognition took place at the Marta Domínguez Pavilion.

==== 2015: World bronze in Stuttgart and further recognition ====
At the beginning of March 2015, Baranova taught with part of the group a master class in Luarca, Asturias. That same month the group had the first competition of the season, the Grand Prix de Thiais, where the team premiered the two new routines, the 5 ribbons on "Europa" by Mónica Naranjo and the 2 hoops + 6 clubs on a remix of District 78 of the song "Ameksa (The Shepard)" by Taalbi Brothers. Claudia Heredia and Lidia Redondo, who had returned to the selection substituted the injured Elena López and Lourdes Mohedano. The team finished in 6th place in the All-Around, while they won the silver medal in the 5 ribbons final and 8th place in the 2 hoops + 6 clubs. That same month, the Spanish team travelled to Lisbon to compete in the World Cup event held in the Portuguese capital. In the same, they achieved the bronze medal in the All-Around, the 7th place in the 5 ribbons final and again the bronze in the 2 hoops + 6 clubs. In April, the team participated at the World Cup in Pesaro, obtaining the bronze medal in the All-Around, 7th place with 5 ribbons and 5th in 2 hoops + 6 clubs. At the beginning of May, the team participated in two exhibitions at the Spanish Championship in School Age, held in Ávila, and at the International Tournament of Corbeil-Essonnes, France. In late May the team travelled to Tashkent to participate in the World Cup held in the Uzbek capital, there they achieved two silver medals in the All-Around and in 2 hoops + 6 clubs, and finished in 6th position with 5 ribbons. In June, the group participated in the European Games in Baku, ending in 4th place in both the All-Around and the 5 ribbons final. That same month, at the World Cup in Kazan, they achieved the 6th position in the All-Around and the 5th place in both the event finals.

On 5 June 2015, Anna Baranova was granted Spanish nationality by naturalisation. In September 2015, the Stuttgart World Championship also served as a first qualifier for the Olympic Games. On the first day of competition, 12 September, the Spanish team won the bronze medal in the All-Around competition with a total score of 34,900, only surpassed by Russia and Bulgaria, gold and silver respectively. It was the first world All-Around medal for Spain since 1998. This position gave the Spanish team a direct quota for the Olympic Games in Rio de Janeiro. On the last day of competition, the Spanish obtained the 6th place in the 5 ribbons final. During this routine, Artemi Gavezou injured her foot. The team then decided not to participate in the final with 2 hoops + 6 clubs, since in addition to that Lidia Redondo, the reserve gymnast, could not compete because she was not enrolled at that time. The team was made by Sandra Aguilar, Artemi Gavezou, Elena López, Lourdes Mohedano and Alejandra Quereda, in addition to Lidia Redondo as an alternate. This championship was broadcast in Spain by Teledeporte with the narration of Paloma del Río and Almudena Cid, being the first World Championship to be broadcast on a Spanish television in that Olympic cycle, since the two previous ones were not transmitted by any national channel.

After this bronze medal, the Spanish team had two receptions in the Superior Sports Council and the Spanish Olympic Committee, in addition to giving numerous interviews to different media, participating for example in the radio program Olympic Planet of Radio Marca or in the television program El hormiguero of Antena 3 on September 24. On November 17, Baranova attended along with Sara Bayón, Mónica Hontoria, Dagmara Brown and the Spanish ensemble, the National Sports Awards, where they were awarded the Baron de Güell Cup as the best national team of 2014, prize that the Superior Sports Council had been awarded them on 13 July and that was shared with the women's football team. The prize was picked up by Alejandra Quereda, captain of the team, and by Jesús Carballo Martínez, president of the Federation, from the hands of King Felipe VI of Spain.

On October 19, 2015, it was announced that the Spanish group would star in the traditional Christmas announcement of the brand Freixenet, and that this would be directed by filmmaker Kike Maíllo. and was recorded between 10 and 11 November on a set in Barcelona. The announcement, entitled "Brillar", premiered on November 25 at an event at the Maritime Museum of Barcelona, and can be seen from that day on the website of Freixenet and on YouTube. He was accompanied by the recording of a promotional documentary called Mereciendo un sueño, where gymnasts and coaches tell their day to day on the national team.

==== 2016: European Holon and silver in the Rio Olympics ====
In February 2016, at the Espoo World Cup, the team premiered two new exercises for the season. The 5 ribbons music had a medley of themes with Brazilian airs: "Vidacarnaval" by Carlinhos Brown, "Bahiana/Batucada" by Inner Sense and Richard Sliwa, and "Sambuka" by Artem Uzunov. The 2 hoops + 6 clubs featured flamenco themes "Jewish Cemetery", "Soleá" and "La aurora de Nueva York", played by the Company Rafael Amargo and Montse Cortés. Rafael Amargo also collaborated with the ensemble in the choreography of the exercise. The team obtained bronze in the All-Around, gold with 5 ribbons and silver in the mixed event. At the beginning of March they achieved the 3 golds in the Schmiden International Tournament. That same month they traveled to the World Cup in Lisbon, where they won bronze in the All-Around, 5th place with 5 ribbons and another bronze in the 3 + 2 final. The following week they moved to France to compete in the Grand Prix of Thiais, which celebrated its 30th edition. There they got All-Around bronze, 4th place in 5 ribbons' final and silver in the 2 hoops + 6 clubs' one. In May, in the World Cup in Tashkent, they hung bronze with 5 ribbons and silver in the mixed final after having obtained 4th place in the All-Around.

In June, the Guadalajara World Cup was held, the first official international rhythmic gymnastics competition held in Spain since the World Cup Final in Benidorm (2008). The event took place from 3 to 5 June in the Multipurpose Palace of Guadalajara with the attendance of some 8,000 people in the last two days. The team managed to win the gold medal in the All-Around ahead of Belarus and Ukraine, while the last day hung two bronzes in the 5 ribbon and the 3 + 2 finals. That same month they participated in the European Championship in Holon, where they obtained the 6th place in the All-Around with a cumulative score of 35,333.81 In the apparatus finals, they won bronze with 5 ribbons with a score of 18,133, and silver in the mixed final with a score of 18,233.82 In July they competed in the Kazan World Cup, At the end of the same month they performed at the Baku World Cup, the last round before the Games, where they achieved the 5th place in the All-Around and two bronzes in the finals.

In August the team participated in the Olympic Games in Rio, being the third Olympic participation of Baranova as a coach. The national team was made by Sandra Aguilar, Artemi Gavezou, Elena López, Lourdes Mohedano and Alejandra Quereda. The competition took place the last two days of the Games at the Olympic Arena in Rio. On 20 August they ended qualifications in 1st place with a score of 35,749 (17,783 with 5 ribbon and 17,966 for 2 hoops + 6 clubs), thus qualifying for the final the following day. On 21 August, in the Olympic final, the Spanish team was placed first after they performed with 5 ribbons with a note of 17,800, in the second rotation, 2 hoops + 6 clubs, they obtained a score of 17.966, eventually finished second after Russia and ahead of Bulgaria, thus achieving the silver medal with a total score of 35,766. This medal was the first Olympic medal for Spanish rhythmic gymnastics since the one won by the Golden Girls in Atlanta 1996.

On 15 November 2016, Baranova received the Bronze Medal of the Royal Order of Sports Merit, awarded by the CSD, which had been awarded to her on 18 October. Also awarded with the Silver Medal to the five components of the Equipaso and with the Bronze Medal to the gymnast Carolina Rodríguez and the judge Ana María Valenti. The ceremony was chaired by Íñigo Méndez de Vigo, Minister of Education, Culture and Sport, and took place in the auditorium of the Museo Nacional Centro de Arte Reina Sofía. After it was announced that Equipaso would star again in the Freixenet Christmas spot, it was presented on November 28 at a gala at the Goya Theatre in Barcelona. It featured the presentation of Almudena Cid and the presence of the team. The announcement, entitled "Shine 2016", was practically the same as the previous year with the exception of the final, which included new images of gymnasts wishing a happy new year with their Olympic silver medal. The campaign was accompanied by a promotional documentary called "La satisfacción es para siempre", with new images and statements from gymnasts about their preparation, and a recreation of the podium of the Rio Games. In 2017, the coach of the ensemble Sara Bayón, asked about the factors that led to the Olympic medal, replied:

Clearly the fourth position in London has served us well for Rio. Seeing you so close to a medal was an extra motivation to face the next Olympic cycle. And on top of that we started with two medals in the 2013 World Cup and that was already like a kick of energy and adrenaline [...] As Anna Baranova said at the time: "In London we kept the medal hanging and at some point it was going to fall

— Sara Bayón, speaking in 2017 to Rincon Olimpico

==== 2017 - 2020: Tokyo 2021 Olympic cycle ====
By 2017, the five holders of the 2016 team stopped competing to rest and focus on academics or other projects. As a result, substitute gymnasts joined the starting team, most of whom had been in the Spanish junior team between 2014 and 2016. On 25 March the new senior Spanish group debuted at the Thiais Grand Prix. In this competition the team was 8th overall and 4th in the final of 3 balls + 2 ropes. In April they competed in the Pesaro World Cup (18th place in the All-Around), the Tashkent World Cup (9th place in the All-Around and 6th place in the 3 balls + 2 ropes final), and the Baku World Cup (7th in the All-Around, 7th in the 5 hoops final and 5th in the 3 balls + 2 ropes final).

On 14 May the new group achieved their first official international medal, obtaining bronze in the 5 hoops final in the World Cup in Portimão. In the All-Around the team was 4th, the same position they achieved in the final of 3 balls + 2 ropes. The group was composed of Mónica Alonso, Victoria Cuadrillero, Clara Esquerdo, Ana Gayán, Lía Rovira and Sara Salarrullana. Since the Guadalajara World Cup the Spanish team was formed by Mónica Alonso, Victoria Cuadrillero, Clara Esquerdo, Ana Gayán, Alba Polo and Lía Rovira. In the All-Around they finished in 6th position and in the final of the mixed exercise of ropes and balls they were 8th. From 11 to 13 August they participated in the last World Cup before the World Championship, held in Kazan Russia. There, the team got the 5th position in the All-Around and the 8th position in both event finals. On 2 September, the team participated in the World Championship in Pesaro. In the mixed routine they scored 16,150, and 14,500 with 5 hoops after two apparatus drops, which placed them in 15th position in the All-Around and did not make it to any apparatus final.

The results of the team at both the group and individual level were rated as scarce that year by numerous people such as former gymnast Almudena Cid, who said "It was many years ago, more than 40, that we did not enter top 24, not even in the 8 best" and pointed out that "the current structure of rhythmic in Spain is not ideal [...] we have to make a recruitment of small girls and think about taking care of them, and if that gymnast is not yet on the national team involve her where there is a follow-up behind [...] so that when she is [...] he does not have to start from scratch».

In March 2018 the team began the season at the City of Desio Trophy, disputing a bilateral match with Italy in which they won silver. An injury to Clara Esquerdo's foot in mid-March meant that the team could not participate in the Grand Prix de Thiais. Later they competed at the Sofia World Cup finishing 10th in the All-Around. In mid-April, at the Pesaro World Cup, the team achieved the 6th position in the All-Around, the 8th with 5 hoops and the 7th in the mixed event, while in May, at the Guadalajara World Cup they were 10th in the All-Around and 6th in the 3 balls + 2 ropes final. In early June they participated in the European Championship in Guadalajara, the first European Championship held in Spain since 2002. They were 5th in the All-Around and 6th in both event finals. At the end of August the team competed in Minsk's World Cup, taking 6th overall position, 7th with 5 hoops and 6th in the 3+2. A week later, at the World Cup in Kazan, they took 10th place in the All-Around and 7th place with 5hoops. In mid-September the group competed at the World Championship in Sofia. Scoring 14,450 with 5 hoops after several drops of the apparatus, while in the mixed routine they scored 19,150, that placed them 20th in the All-Around. In the 3 balls + 2 ropes final they occupied 8th place with 19,800. The team was formed in this championship by Monica Alonso, Victoria Quadrillero, Clara Esquerdo, Ana Gayán, Alba Polo and Sara Salarrullana.

At the beginning of March 2019, the team began the season in the International Diputación de Málaga, achieving bronze. After an exhibition in Corbeil-Essonnes, they participated in the Grand Prix of Thiais, obtaining the 10th place in the All-Around and the 6th with 3 hoops and 4 clubs. In April they achieved 10th and 12th place in the All-Around at the Pesaro and Baku's World Cups respectively. In May, at the Guadalajara World Cup, they were 4th in the All-Around, 7th with 5 balls and 4th with 3 hoops + 4 clubs. After several preparatory competitions, in September they competed at the World Championship in Baku, finishing 17th and thus not achieving the Olympic qualification. The team was made by Victoria Quadrillero, Clara Esquerdo, Ana Gayán, Alba Polo, Emma Reyes and Sara Salarrullana.

==== Coaching the French group (2020 - present) ====
After the Spanish Federation did not renew her contract, ending in August 2020, on December 3, 2020 she was appointed as new coach for France's group, being accompanied by Sara Bayón.
