= Emma Reyes (gymnast) =

Spanish former rhythmic gymnast

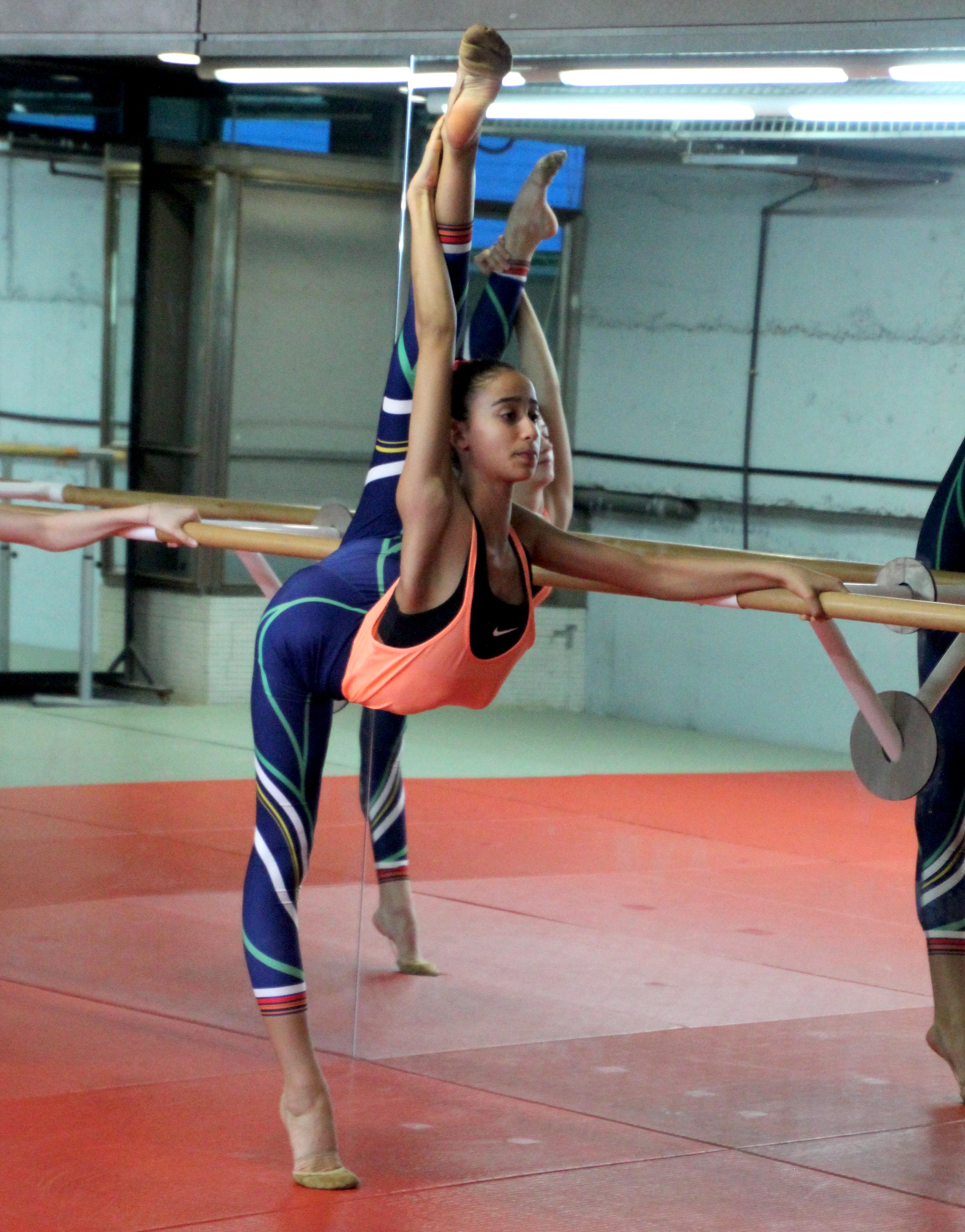

Personal information
- Full name: Emma Reyes Blanco
- Born: 13 September 2002 (age 23) Badalona, Spain

Gymnastics career
- Discipline: Rhythmic gymnastics
- Country represented: Spain (2016-2020)
- Club: Club Gimnàstica Rítmica Lloret
- Head coach: Anna Baranova
- Assistant coach: Sara Bayón
- Former coach: Ana María Pelaz
- Retired: yes

Emma Reyes (born 13 September 2002) is a former Spanish rhythmic gymnast who competed with the national group of Spain.

== Career ==
Emma started in rhythmic gymnastics at the Club Gimnàstica Rítmica Lloret in Lloret de Mar.

=== Junior ===
In February 2016 she was selected for a training trial of the national team in the CAR of Madrid. Reyes entered the national junior group in October 2016, going on to train under the orders of Ana María Pelaz in the CAR of Madrid. In April 2017 she debuted with the group at the Città di Pesaro International Tournament, obtaining the 19th place. That same month she made an exhibition with the junior team at the Corbeil-Essonnes International Tournament, and in May, the team competed at the Portimão International Tournament, where they were the only participants in their category. At the European Championship, which was held from May 19 to 21 in Budapest, they ranked 20th in qualification. The junior team was made up that year by Emma, Marta Bosch, Ángela Corao, Tania Kaute, Judith Prades and Marian Navarro.

=== Senior ===
In 2017 Emma began to work in the senior reserve group under the orders of Anna Baranova and Sara Bayón, although, due to her age, it was not until 2019 when she officially began to be part of the senior category and to be a regular gymnast, although only in the exercise of 3 hoops and 4 clubs.

At the beginning of March 2019, the team began the season at the Diputación de Málaga International Tournament in Marbella, achieving bronze. After an exhibition in Corbeil-Essonnes, they participated in the Grand Prix de Thiais, obtaining 10th place overall and 6th in 3 hoops and 4 clubs. In April they achieved 10th and 12th place overall at the World Cup events in Pesaro and Baku respectively. In May, at the World Cup in Guadalajara, they were 4th in the All-Around, 7th with 5 balls and 4th in the mixed routine. After several preparatory competitions, in September they disputed the World Championships in Baku, being able to obtain only 17th place in the All-Around and not achieving the Olympic place. The team was formed in this championship by Emma, Victoria Cuadrillero, Clara Esquerdo, Alba Polo, Ana Gayán and Sara Salarrullana.

In August 2020, Reyes was removed from the senior team after a control carried out between August 12 and 13 by the technical team led by the new national coach Alejandra Quereda and by the technical director Isabel Pagán, considering that she did not meet the requirements. to continue in the national team. On August 15, the gymnast herself announced through her social networks the decision of the technical team, as well as her interest in continuing to be active as a gymnast. She eventually ended her sporting career in July 2021.
