= Mireia Martínez =

Spanish rhythmic gymnast (born 2005)

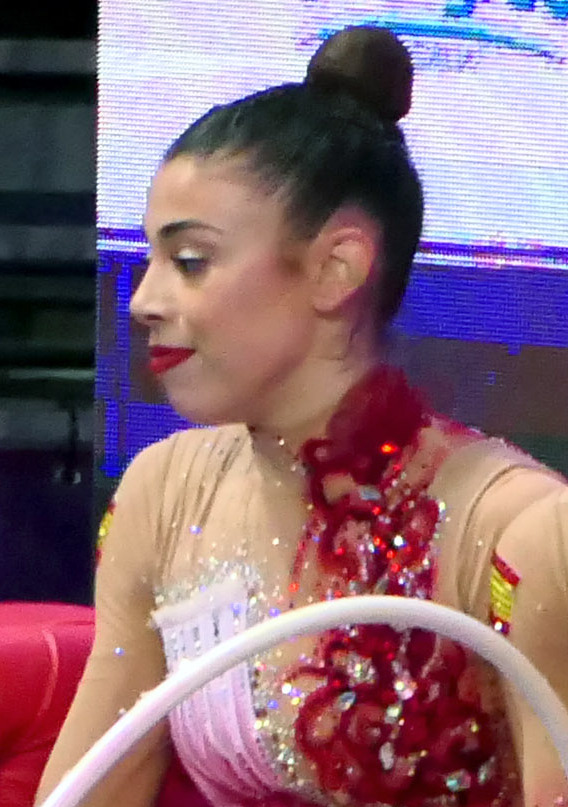
- Martínez in 2024

Personal information
- Born: 21 April 2005 (age 21) La Pobla de Vallbona, Spain

Gymnastics career
- Discipline: Rhythmic gymnastics
- Country represented: Spain (2021-2026)
- Club: CGR Riba Roja
- Head coach: Alejandra Quereda
- Assistant coach: Ana María Pelaz
- Retired: yes
Medal record
Event	1st	2nd	3rd
World Championships	0	1	4
European Championships	1	2	2
FIG World Cup	1	5	3
Total	2	8	9
Rhythmic Gymnastics
Representing Spain
World Championships
Silver medal – second place	2023 Valencia	5 Hoops
Bronze medal – third place	2022 Sofia	Team
Bronze medal – third place	2022 Sofia	Group All Around
Bronze medal – third place	2022 Sofia	5 Hoops
Bronze medal – third place	2023 Valencia	Group All Around
European Championships
Gold medal – first place	2024 Budapest	3 Ribbons + 2 Balls
Silver medal – second place	2022 Tel Aviv	3 Ribbons + 2 Balls
Silver medal – second place	2024 Budapest	5 Hoops
Bronze medal – third place	2023 Baku	3 Ribbons + 2 Balls
Bronze medal – third place	2024 Budapest	Group All-Around

Mireia Martínez (born 21 April 2005) is a retired Spanish rhythmic gymnast. She's the bronze All-Around and 5 hoops medalist at the 2022 World Championships.

== Personal life ==
She took up the sport at age four in La Pobla de Vallbona, she came to this sport by chance when walking at the sports complex in her hometown and she saw some girls practising rhythmic gymnastics. Her dream was to compete at the 2024 Olympic Games in Paris.

== Career ==
She trains twice a day at the High Performance Centre (CAR) in Madrid. In 2021 Martínez participated in the World Championships along Inés Bergua, Ana Gayan, Valeria Márquez, Uma Mendez and Patricia Pérez, finishing 12th in the All-Around and 5th in the 3 hoops + 4 clubs' final.

The group debuted in 2022 at the World Cup in Sofia, they were 5th in the All-Around and 5 hoops and 6th with 3 ribbons + 2 balls. In Baku they were 12th in the All-Around and therefore didn't qualify for event finals. A month later in Pamplona they won bronze in the All-Around and silver with 5 hoops. In Portimão they won 3 silver medals. They won All-Around bronze and 5 hoops and silver with 3 ribbons + 2 balls in Cluj-Napoca. Mireia took part, with Ana Arnau, Inés Bergua, Valeria Márquez, Patricia Pérez and Salma Solaun in the 2022 European Championships in Tel Aviv, winning silver in the 3 ribbons + 2 balls final, and the World Championships in Sofia where the Spanish group won three bronze medals: All-Around (earning them a spot for the 2024 Olympics), 5 hoops, and team.

In 2023 Mireia and the group debuted at the World Cup in Sofia, taking 11th place overall and 8th with 3 ribbons & 2 balls. A week later they competed at the Grand Prix in Thiais. In April the group took part in the World Cup in Baku, being 10th in the All-Around and 8th with 5 hoops. In Portimão they won gold in the All-Around and silver with 5 hoops. At the European Championships in Baku the group finished 6th overall, 4th with 5 hoops and won bronze in the mixed event. After a training camp in Alicante Salma was selected for the World Championships in Valencia, there along Inés Bergua, Salma Solaun, Ana Arnau and Patricia Pérez, she took bronze in the All-Around and silver with 5 hoops.

The first competition of the group in 2024 was the World Cup in Athens, where they took 4th place in the All-Around, 8th with 5 hoops and 7th with 3 ribbons & 2 balls. Weeks later, in Sofia they won silver with 5 balls, in Baku the group won gold in the All-Around and silver with 3 ribbons & 2 balls. In May she won gold in the All-Around and with 5 hoops as well as bronze in the mixed event at the stage in Portimão. At the European Championships in Budapest the Spanish group won bronze in the All-Around, silver with 5 hoops and gold with 3 ribbons & 2 balls. At the last World Cup of the season, in Cluj-Napoca, they won gold in the mixed event final. In early August Mireia, Ana Arnau, Inés Bergua, Salma Solaun and Patricia Pérez competed at the Olympic Games in Paris, where they took 10th place in the qualification event and thus not advancing to the final.
