= Patricia Pérez (gymnast) =

Spanish rhythmic gymnast (born 2004)

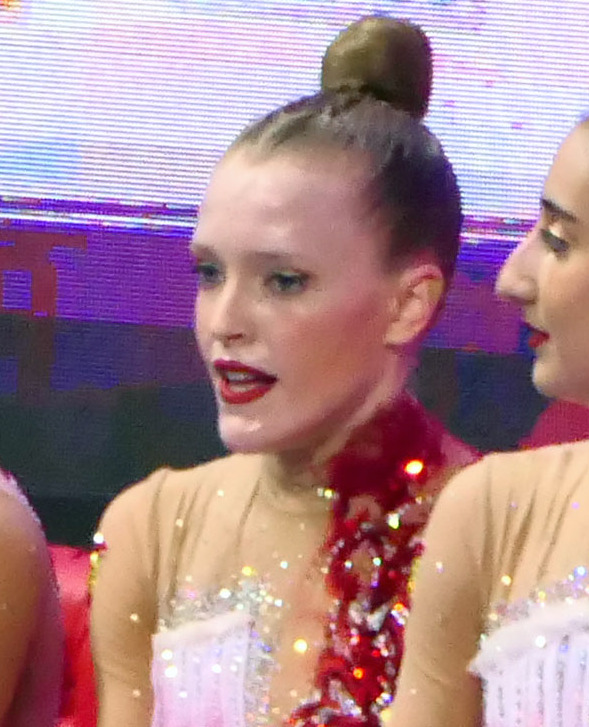
- Pérez in 2024

Personal information
- Born: 8 August 2004 (age 22) Valencia, Spain

Gymnastics career
- Discipline: Rhythmic gymnastics
- Country represented: Spain (2019-2024)
- Club: CEG Almussafes
- Head coach: Alejandra Quereda
- Assistant coach: Ana María Pelaz
- Retired: Yes
Medal record
| Event | 1st | 2nd | 3rd |
|---|---|---|---|
| World Championships | 0 | 1 | 4 |
| European Championships | 1 | 2 | 2 |
| FIG World Cup | 1 | 5 | 3 |
| Total | 2 | 8 | 9 |
Rhythmic Gymnastics
Representing Spain
World Championships
| Silver medal – second place | 2023 Valencia | 5 Hoops |
| Bronze medal – third place | 2022 Sofia | Team |
| Bronze medal – third place | 2022 Sofia | Group All Around |
| Bronze medal – third place | 2022 Sofia | 5 Hoops |
| Bronze medal – third place | 2023 Valencia | Group All Around |
European Championships
| Gold medal – first place | 2024 Budapest | 3 Ribbons + 2 Balls |
| Silver medal – second place | 2022 Tel Aviv | 3 Ribbons + 2 Balls |
| Silver medal – second place | 2024 Budapest | 5 Hoops |
| Bronze medal – third place | 2023 Baku | 3 Ribbons + 2 Balls |
| Bronze medal – third place | 2024 Budapest | Group All-Around |

Patricia Pérez (born 8 August 2004) is a retired Spanish rhythmic gymnast. She was the bronze All-Around and five hoops medalist at the 2022 World Championships.

== Personal life ==
Pérez took up gymnastics at age five. After er parents saw a poster advertising the sport in Sueca and asked her whether she wanted to attend, she said yes.

In October 2020, she underwent surgery on the meniscus in her left knee; her recovery took about six weeks. She trains twice a day at the High Performance Centre (CAR) in Madrid.

== Career ==
=== Junior ===
Pérez was part of the Spanish junior group that competed at both the 2019 European and World Championships, finishing seventh in Baku and fifth in Moscow.

=== Senior ===
In 2021 Pérez participated in the World Championships alongside Inés Bergua, Ana Gayán, Valeria Márquez, Uma Mendez and Mireia Martínez, finishing 12th in the All-Around and fifth in the three hoops and four clubs' final.

The group debuted in 2022 at the World Cup in Sofia, they were fifth in the All-Around and five hoops and sixth with three ribbons and two balls. In Baku they were 12th in the All-Around and therefore did not qualify for event finals. A month later in Pamplona, they won bronze in the All-Around and silver with five hoops. In Portimão they won three silver medals. They won All-Around bronze and five hoops and silver with three ribbons and two balls in Cluj-Napoca. Patricia took part, with Ana Arnau, Inés Bergua, Valeria Márquez, Mireia Martínez and Salma Solaun in the 2022 European Championships in Tel Aviv, winning silver in the three ribbons and two balls final, and the World Championships in Sofia, where the Spanish group won three bronze medals: All-Around (earning them a spot for the 2024 Olympics), five hoops, and team.

In 2023, Pérez and the group debuted at the World Cup in Sofia, taking 11th place overall and eighth with three ribbons and two balls. A week later, they competed at the Grand Prix in Thiais. In April the group took part in the World Cup in Baku, being 10th in the All-Around and eighth with five hoops. In Portimão, they won gold in the All-Around and silver with five hoops. At the European Championships in Baku, the group finished sixth overall, fourth with five hoops and won bronze in the mixed event. After a training camp in Alicante, Salma was selected for the World Championships in Valencia, alongside Inés Bergua, Salma Solaun, Mireia Martínez and Ana Arnau, she took bronze in the All-Around and silver with five hoops.

The first competition of the group in 2024 was the World Cup in Athens, where they took fourth place in the All-Around, eighth with five hoops and seventh with three ribbons and two balls. Weeks later, in Sofia, they won silver with five balls. In Baku, the group won gold in the All-Around and silver with three ribbons and two balls. In May, she won gold in the All-Around and with five hoops as well as bronze in the mixed event at the stage in Portimão. At the European Championships in Budapest the Spanish group won bronze in the All-Around, silver with five hoops and gold with three ribbons and two balls. At the last World Cup of the season, in Cluj-Napoca, they won gold in the mixed event final. In early August, Pérez, Ana Arnau, Inés Bergua, Mireia Martínez and Salma Solaun competed at the Olympic Games in Paris, where they took 10th place in the qualification event and thus did not advance to the final.
