= Valeria Márquez (gymnast) =

Spanish rhythmic gymnast (born 2004)

- Born: 21 April 2004 (age 22) Almería

Gymnastics career
- Discipline: Rhythmic gymnastics
- Country represented: Spain; (2019-)
- Club: El Ejido
- Head coaches: Alejandra Quereda, Ana María Pelaz
Medal record
Event	1st	2nd	3rd
European Championships	0	1	0
World Championships	0	0	3
FIG World Cup	0	5	3
Total	0	6	6
Rhythmic Gymnastics
Representing Spain
World Championships
Bronze medal – third place	2022 Sofia	Team
Bronze medal – third place	2022 Sofia	Group All Around
Bronze medal – third place	2022 Sofia	5 Hoops
European Championships
Silver medal – second place	2022 Tel Aviv	3 Ribbons + 2 Balls

Valeria Márquez (born 21 April 2004) is a Spanish rhythmic gymnast. She won the bronze All-Around and 5 hoops medals at the 2022 World Championships.

== Career ==
=== Junior ===
Márquez was part of the Spanish junior group that competed at both the 2019 European and World Championships, finishing 7th in Baku and 5th in Moscow.

=== Senior ===
In 2021 Valeria participated in the World Championships along Inés Bergua, Ana Gayán, Patricia Pérez, Uma Mendez and Mireia Martínez, finishing 12th in the All-Around and 5th in the 3 hoops + 4 clubs' final.

The group debuted in 2022 at the World Cup in Sofia, they were 5th in the All-Around and 5 hoops and 6th with 3 ribbons + 2 balls. In Baku they were 12th in the All-Around and therefore didn't qualify for event finals. A month later in Pamplona they won bronze in the All-Around and silver with 5 hoops. In Portimão they won 3 silver medals. They won All-Around bronze and 5 hoops and silver with 3 ribbons + 2 balls in Cluj-Napoca. Valeria took part, with Ana Arnau, Inés Bergua, Patricia Pérez, Mireia Martínez and Salma Solaun in the 2022 European Championships in Tel Aviv, winning silver in the 3 ribbons + 2 balls final, and the World Championships in Sofia where the Spanish group won three bronze medals: All-Around (earning them a spot for the 2024 Olympics), 5 hoops, and team.
