= Giuseppina Finzi-Magrini =

Italian soprano

Giuseppina Finzi-Magrini (Turin, 1878 – Desio, 1944) was an Italian soprano.

Finzi-Magrini made her debut in 1896 as Oscar in Un ballo in maschera. She was remembered for her style and moderation. In retirement she turned to teaching. Her students included the Danish baritone Frantz Rabinowitz (1918–1948).

In 1943, when Italy came under Nazi occupation and Jews were being hunted, Finzi-Magrini who was of Jewish origin went into hiding under a false name. In 1944 a young nephew was deported to a concentration camp, causing a heart attack that left her mute and paralyzed. She died six weeks later from wounds received in an American air raid on Desio.

== Recordings ==
- Rigoletto: Deh non parlare (with Titta Ruffo).

== In fiction ==
Finzi-Magrini is referenced often in Andre Maurois' 1920 novel Les silences du colonel Bramble (The Silence of Colonel Bramble). She is the favourite singer of the British officer of the title, who likes to listen to her singing on his gramophone throughout World War I.
