= Ana Arnau =

Spanish rhythmic gymnast (born 2005)

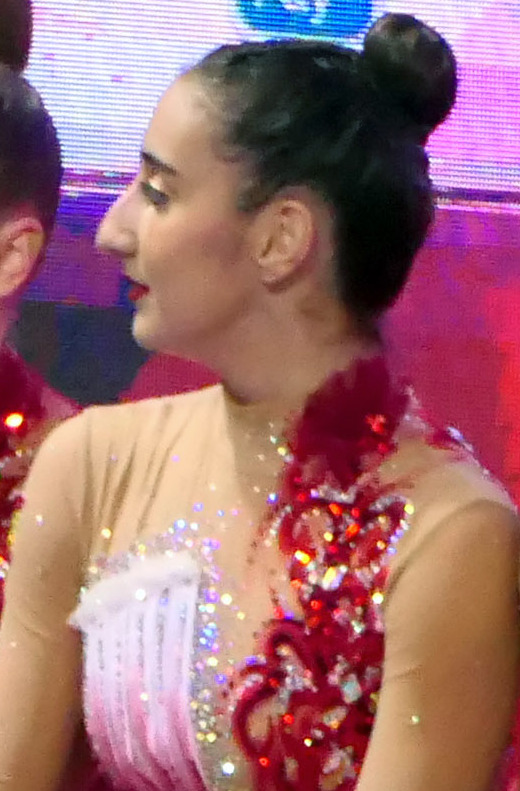
- Arnau in 2024

Personal information
- Full name: Ana Arnau Camarena
- Nickname: Anita
- Born: 20 September 2005 (age 20) Madrid, Spain

Gymnastics career
- Discipline: Rhythmic gymnastics
- Country represented: Spain (2019-2024)
- Club: Club Gimnastico Alcobendas Chamartin
- Head coaches: Alejandra Quereda, Ana María Pelaz
Medal record
Event	1st	2nd	3rd
World Championships	0	1	4
European Championships	1	2	2
FIG World Cup	1	5	3
Total	2	8	9
Rhythmic Gymnastics
Representing Spain
World Championships
Silver medal – second place	2023 Valencia	5 Hoops
Bronze medal – third place	2022 Sofia	Team
Bronze medal – third place	2022 Sofia	Group All Around
Bronze medal – third place	2022 Sofia	5 Hoops
Bronze medal – third place	2023 Valencia	Group All Around
European Championships
Gold medal – first place	2024 Budapest	3 Ribbons + 2 Balls
Silver medal – second place	2022 Tel Aviv	3 Ribbons + 2 Balls
Silver medal – second place	2024 Budapest	5 Hoops
Bronze medal – third place	2023 Baku	3 Ribbons + 2 Balls
Bronze medal – third place	2024 Budapest	Group All-Around

Ana Arnau Camarena (Note: In this Spanish name, the first or paternal surname is Arnau and the second or maternal family name is Camarena.) (born 20 September 2005) is a Spanish rhythmic gymnast. She was the bronze All-Around and five hoops medalist at the 2022 World Championships.

== Career ==
=== Junior ===
Arnau was part of the Spanish junior group that competed at both the 2019 European and World Championships, finishing 7th in Baku and 5th in Moscow.

=== Senior ===
Ana debuted with senior group in 2022 at the World Cup in Sofia, they were 5th in the All-Around and five hoops and 6th with three ribbons + two balls. In Baku they were 12th in the All-Around and therefore didn't qualify for event finals. A month later in Pamplona they won bronze in the All-Around and silver with five hoops. In Portimão they won three silver medals. They won All-Around bronze and five hoops and silver with three ribbons + two balls in Cluj-Napoca. Inéz took part, with Inés Bergua, Valeria Márquez, Patricia Pérez, Mireia Martínez and Salma Solaun in the 2022 European Championships in Tel Aviv, winning silver in the three ribbons + two balls final, and the World Championships in Sofia where the Spanish group won three bronze medals: All-Around (earning them a spot for the 2024 Olympics), five hoops, and team.

In 2023 Ana and the group debuted at the World Cup in Sofia, taking 11th place overall and 8th with three ribbons & two balls. A week later they competed at the Grand Prix in Thiais. In April the group took part in the World Cup in Baku, being 10th in the All-Around and 8th with five hoops. In Portimão they won gold in the All-Around and silver with five hoops. At the European Championships in Baku the group finished 6th overall, 4th with five hoops and won bronze in the mixed event. After a training camp in Alicante Salma was selected for the World Championships in Valencia, there along Inés Bergua, Salma Solaun, Mireia Martínez and Patricia Pérez, she took bronze in the All-Around and silver with five hoops.

The first competition of the group in 2024 was the World Cup in Athens, where they took 4th place in the All-Around, 8th with five hoops and 7th with three ribbons & two balls. Weeks later, in Sofia they won silver with five balls, in Baku the group won gold in the All-Around and silver with three ribbons & two balls. In May she won gold in the All-Around and with five hoops as well as bronze in the mixed event at the stage in Portimão. At the European Championships in Budapest the Spanish group won bronze in the All-Around, silver with five hoops and gold with three ribbons & two balls. At the last World Cup of the season, in Cluj-Napoca, they won gold in the mixed event final. In early August Ana, Salma Solaun, Inés Bergua, Mireia Martínez and Patricia Pérez competed at the Olympic Games in Paris, where they took 10th place in the qualification event and thus not advancing to the final.
