= Desio =

Desio Des (Lombard)
- Comune
- Città di Desio
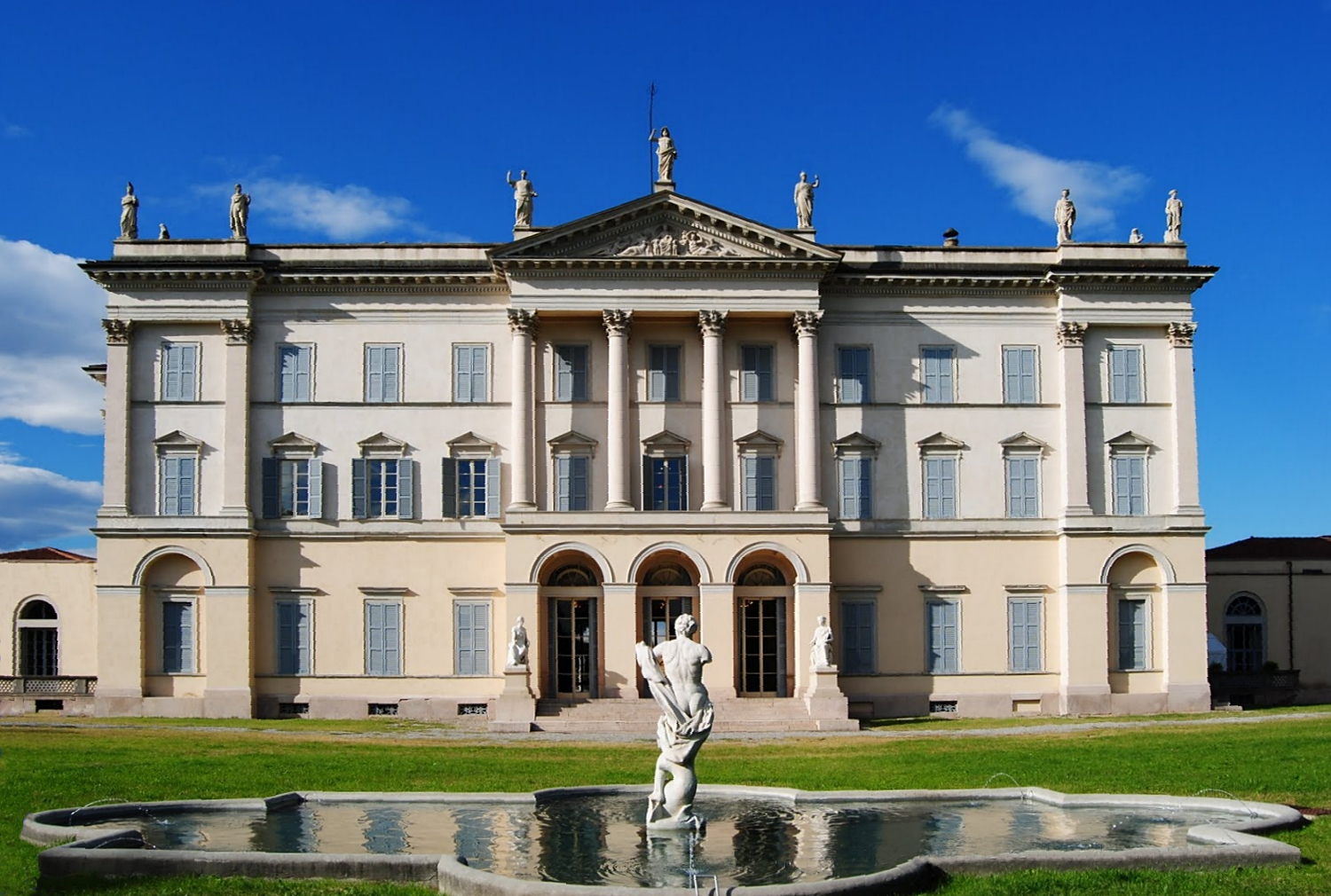
- Villa Tittoni Traversi

- Coat of arms

- Location within Italy Location within Lombardy
- Coordinates: 45°37′N 09°13′E
- Country: Italy
- Region: Lombardy
- Province: Monza and Brianza (MB)
- Frazioni: San Carlo, San Giorgio, San Giuseppe

Government
  - Mayor: Simone Gargiulo (since October 18, 2021) (Civic list)

Area
  - Total: 14 km^{2} (5.4 sq mi)
- Elevation: 196 m (643 ft)

Population (30 November 2017)
  - Total: 41,960
  - Density: 3,000/km^{2} (7,800/sq mi)
- Demonym: Desiani
- Time zone: UTC+1 (CET)
  - Summer (DST): UTC+2 (CEST)
- Postal code: 20832
- Dialing code: 0362
- Patron saint: Madonna del Rosario
- Saint day: First Sunday in October
- Website: Official website

Desio (Brianzoeu: Des) is a comune (municipality) in the province of Monza and Brianza, in the Italian region of Lombardy.

== History ==
In 1277 it was the location of the battle between the Visconti and della Torre families for the rule of Milan. On 24 February 1924, Desio received the honorary title of city with a royal decree.

In 1944 the opera singer Giuseppina Finzi-Magrini was killed in an American air raid on Desio.

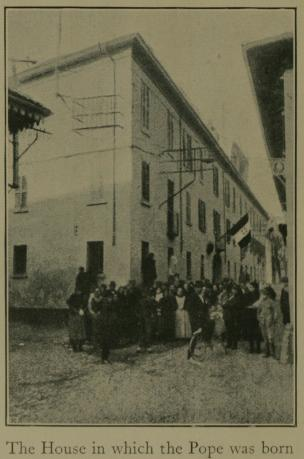
Birthplace of Pope Pius XI on Vicolo del Popolo; it was later renamed Via Achille Ratti in his honour

The town is known for being the birthplace of Achille Ratti, later Pope Pius XI (born 1857, elected Pope 1922, died 1939), information which the road sign on Desio’s border recalls. In the centre, more precisely in Via Pio XI 4, tourists and citizens can visit the Pope’s house every Sunday. On November 20, 1998, it was instituted the International Studies and Documentation Center Pius XI, at the presence of Mgr. Maurizio Galli. On 28 May 2022, Desio’s hospital was named after Pius XI to celebrate the 100th anniversary of the Pope’s election.

Marco Sportiello, A.C. Milan goalkeeper, was also born in Desio.

Gabriele Oriali, former Inter‘s icon and 1982 FIFA World Cup winner with Italy, lives in Desio.

== Main sights ==
- Villa Tittoni Traversi (18th century)
- Torre dei Palagi (19th century)
- Polo di Eccellenza

== Transport ==
Desio is served by Desio railway station.

== Sports ==
Gruppo Sportivo Santi Pietro e Paolo, also referred to as S. Pietro e Paolo Desio, is one of the most famous football teams in Desio. Founded in October 2003, the Group started its activities in March 2004 becoming affiliated with the Centro Universitario Sportivo Italiano (CUSI), the entity for sport promotion acknowledged by the Italian National Olympic Committee and the Episcopal Conference of Italy. Members of the Italian rhythmic gymnastics national team live and train in Desio.

The football team U.S. Aurora Desio 1922, which plays in the Seconda Categoria, is based in Desio. The club is also affiliated with AC Monza
