= Spain at the 2008 Summer Olympics =

- IOC code: ESP
- NOC: Spanish Olympic Committee
- Website: www.coe.es (in Spanish)

in Beijing
- Competitors: 286 (164 men and 122 women) in 25 sports
- Flag bearers: David Cal (opening); Joan Llaneras (closing)
- Medals Ranked 14th: Gold 5 Silver 11 Bronze 3 Total 19

Summer Olympics appearances (overview)
- 1900; 1904–1912; 1920; 1924; 1928; 1932; 1936; 1948; 1952; 1956; 1960; 1964; 1968; 1972; 1976; 1980; 1984; 1988; 1992; 1996; 2000; 2004; 2008; 2012; 2016; 2020; 2024; 2028

Spain competed at the 2008 Summer Olympics in Beijing, People's Republic of China, with a total of 286 athletes, 164 men and 122 women, took part in 154 events in 25 sports.

== Medalists ==
Main article: 2008 Summer Olympics medal table

Medal	Name	Sport	Event
Gold	Samuel Sánchez	Cycling	Men's road race
Gold	Joan Llaneras	Cycling	Men's points race
Gold	Rafael Nadal	Tennis	Men's singles
Gold	Fernando Echavarri; Antón Paz Blanco	Sailing	Tornado class
Gold	Saúl Craviotto; Carlos Pérez	Canoeing	Men's K-2 500 m
Silver	Iker Martínez; Xabier Fernández	Sailing	49er class
Silver	Anabel Medina Garrigues; Virginia Ruano Pascual	Tennis	Women's doubles
Silver	Gervasio Deferr	Gymnastics	Men's floor exercises
Silver	Joan Llaneras; Antonio Tauler	Cycling	Men's Madison
Silver	Andrea Fuentes; Gemma Mengual	Synchronized swimming	Women's duet
Silver	David Cal	Canoeing	Men's C-1 1000 m
Silver	David Cal	Canoeing	Men's C-1 500 m
Silver	Alba María Cabello; Raquel Corral; Andrea Fuentes; Gemma Mengual; Thaïs Henríquez; Laura López; Gisela Morón; Irina Rodríguez; Paola Tirados	Synchronized swimming	Women's team
Silver	Spain men's national field hockey team: David Alegre; Ramón Alegre; Pablo Amat; Eduard Arbos; Francisco Cortes; Sergi Enrique; Alexandre Fabregas; Francisco Fábregas; Juan Fernandez; Santi Freixa; Rodrigo Garza; Roc Oliva; Xavier Ribas; Albert Sala; Víctor Sojo; Eduardo Tubau	Field hockey	Men's tournament
Silver	Spain men's national basketball team: José Calderón; Rudy Fernández; Jorge Garbajosa; Marc Gasol; Pau Gasol; Carlos Jiménez; Raúl López; Álex Mumbrú; Juan Carlos Navarro; Felipe Reyes; Berni Rodríguez; Ricky Rubio	Basketball	Men's tournament
Silver	Lydia Valentin	Weightlifting	Women's 75 kg
Bronze	José Luis Abajo	Fencing	Men's individual épée
Bronze	Leire Olaberría	Cycling	Women's points race
Bronze	Spain men's national handball team: David Barrufet; Jon Belaustegui; David Davis; Alberto Entrerrios; Raul Entrerrios; Ruben Garabaya; Juan Garcia; Jose Javier Hombrados; Demetrio Lozano; Cristian Malmagro; Carlos Prieto; Albert Rocas; Iker Romero; Víctor Tomás	Handball	Men's tournament

Medals by sport
Sport	1st place, gold medalist(s)	2nd place, silver medalist(s)	3rd place, bronze medalist(s)	Total
Basketball	0	1	0	1
Canoeing	1	2	0	3
Cycling	2	1	1	4
Fencing	0	0	1	1
Field hockey	0	1	0	1
Gymnastics	0	1	0	1
Handball	0	0	1	1
Sailing	1	1	0	2
Synchronized swimming	0	2	0	2
Tennis	1	1	0	2
Weightlifting	0	1	0	1
Total	5	11	3	19

== Delegation ==
The following is the list of number of competitors participating in the Games. Note that reserves for fencing, field hockey, football, and handball are not counted as athletes:

Sport	Men	Women	Total
Archery	1	0	1
Athletics	32	22	54
Badminton	1	1	2
Basketball	12	12	24
Boxing	1	—N/a	1
Canoeing	5	5	10
Cycling	14	4	18
Diving	1	1	2
Equestrian	2	1	3
Fencing	4	1	5
Field hockey	16	16	32
Gymnastics	6	9	15
Handball	15	0	15
Judo	2	4	6
Modern pentathlon	1	0	1
Rowing	0	1	1
Sailing	9	7	16
Shooting	5	2	7
Swimming	10	13	23
Synchronized swimming	—N/a	9	9
Table tennis	2	3	5
Taekwondo	2	1	3
Tennis	4	5	9
Triathlon	2	2	4
Volleyball	2	0	2
Water polo	13	0	13
Weightlifting	1	1	2
Wrestling	1	2	3
Total	164	122	286

== Archery ==
Spain sent one archer to the Olympics. Daniel Morillo earned a spot to compete in the men's competition.

Athlete	Event	Ranking round		Round of 64	Round of 32	Round of 16	Quarterfinals	Semifinals	Final / BM	
Athlete	Event	Score	Seed	Opposition Score	Opposition Score	Opposition Score	Opposition Score	Opposition Score	Opposition Score	Rank
Daniel Morillo	Men's individual	657	33	Ivashko (UKR) (32); W 115–107	Serrano (MEX) (1); L 111–112	Did not advance				

== Athletics ==
The list with the athletes classified for the 2008 Summer Olympics were released in July, after the Campeonato de España de Atletismo 2008 can be found on the following ref.

Key

- Note–Ranks given for track events are within the athlete's heat only
- Q = Qualified for the next round
- q = Qualified for the next round as a fastest loser or, in field events, by position without achieving the qualifying target
- NR = National record
- N/A = Round not applicable for the event
- Bye = Athlete not required to compete in round

Men
Track & road events

Athlete	Event	Heat		Quarterfinal		Semifinal		Final	
Athlete	Event	Result	Rank	Result	Rank	Result	Rank	Result	Rank
Ángel David Rodríguez	100 m	10.34	4 q	10.35	8	Did not advance			
Ángel David Rodríguez	200 m	20.87	4 q	20.96	8	Did not advance			
Antonio Manuel Reina	800 m	1:46.30	3 q	—N/a		1:46.40	7	Did not advance	
Manuel Olmedo	800 m	1:45.78	1 Q	—N/a		1:45.91	4	Did not advance	
Miguel Quesada	800 m	1:48.06	4	—N/a		Did not advance			
Arturo Casado	1500 m	3:36.42	2 Q	—N/a		3:41.57	11	Did not advance	
Juan Carlos Higuero	1500 m	3:41.70	3 Q	—N/a		3:37.31	3 Q	3:34.44	4
Reyes Estévez	1500 m	3:39.62	8	—N/a		Did not advance			
Alberto García	5000 m	13:58.20	9	—N/a				Did not advance	
Alemayehu Bezabeh	5000 m	13:37.88	5 q	—N/a				13:30.48	11
Jesús España	5000 m	13:48.88	4 Q	—N/a				13:55.94	14
Ayad Lamdassen	10000 m	—N/a						28:13.73	24
Carles Castillejo	10000 m	—N/a						28:13.68	23
Juan Carlos de la Ossa	10000 m	—N/a						27:54.20	17
Jackson Quiñónez	110 m hurdles	13.41	2 Q	13.47	3 Q	13.40	3 Q	13.69	8
Eliseo Martín	3000 m steeplechase	8:23.19	12	—N/a				Did not advance	
José Luis Blanco	3000 m steeplechase	8:37.37	5	—N/a				Did not advance	
Rubén Palomeque	3000 m steeplechase	8:58.50	12	—N/a				Did not advance	
Julio Rey	Marathon	—N/a						DNF	
José Ríos	Marathon	—N/a						2:32:35	72
José Manuel Martínez	Marathon	—N/a						2:14:00	16
Benjamín Sánchez	20 km walk	—N/a						1:21:38	13
Juan Manuel Molina	20 km walk	—N/a						1:21:25	12
Paquillo Fernández	20 km walk	—N/a						1:20:32	7
Jesús Ángel García	50 km walk	—N/a						3:44:08	4
Mikel Odriozola	50 km walk	—N/a						3:51:30	13
Santiago Pérez	50 km walk	—N/a						3:59:41	26

Field events

Athlete	Event	Qualification		Final	
Athlete	Event	Distance	Position	Distance	Position
Luis Felipe Méliz	Long jump	7.95	10 q	8.07	7
Javier Bermejo	High jump	2.20	29	Did not advance	
Manuel Martínez	Shot put	19.81	19	Did not advance	
Frank Casañas	Discus throw	64.99	4 Q	66.49	5
Mario Pestano	Discus throw	64.42	7 q	63.42	9

Combined events – Decathlon

Athlete	Event	100 m	LJ	SP	HJ	400 m	110H	DT	PV	JT	1500 m	Final	Rank
David Gómez	Result	11.12	6.85	13.58	1.81	49.27	14.61	40.17	NM	62.22	4:30.74	6876	24
David Gómez	Points	834	778	703	636	849	897	668	0	771	740	6876	24

Women
Track & road events

Athlete	Event	Heat		Semifinal		Final	
Athlete	Event	Result	Rank	Result	Rank	Result	Rank
Iris Fuentes-Pila	1500 m	4:14.10	2 Q	—N/a		4:04.86	8
Natalia Rodríguez	1500 m	4:05.30	2 Q	—N/a		4:03.19	6
Dolores Checa	5000 m	15:31.22	13	—N/a		Did not advance	
Isabel Checa	10000 m	—N/a				33:17.88	29
Josephine Onyia	100 m hurdles	12.68	1 Q	12.86	5	Did not advance	
Laia Forcadell	400 m hurdles	58.64	7	Did not advance			
Marta Domínguez	3000 m steeplechase	9:22.11	2 Q	—N/a		DNF	
Rosa Morató	3000 m steeplechase	9:45.33	12	—N/a		Did not advance	
Zulema Fuentes-Pila	3000 m steeplechase	9:29.40	4 Q	—N/a		9:35.16	12
Alessandra Aguilar	Marathon	—N/a				2:39:29	54
María José Pueyo	Marathon	—N/a				2:48:01	64
Yesenia Centeno	Marathon	—N/a				2:36:25	45
Beatriz Pascual	20 km walk	—N/a				1:27:44	6
María Vasco	20 km walk	—N/a				1:27:25	5
María José Poves	20 km walk	—N/a				1:30:51	18

Field events

Athlete	Event	Qualification		Final	
Athlete	Event	Distance	Position	Distance	Position
Concepción Montaner	Long jump	6.53	16	Did not advance	
Carlota Castrejana	Triple jump	14.02	16	Did not advance	
Ruth Beitia	High jump	1.93	=1 q	1.96	=7
Naroa Agirre	Pole vault	4.40	13	Did not advance	
Irache Quintanal	Shot put	NM	—	Did not advance	
Mercedes Chilla	Javelin throw	61.81	8 Q	58.13	9
Berta Castells	Hammer throw	62.44	41	Did not advance	

== Badminton ==
Spain sent two badminton players to Beijing; Pablo Abián - men's singles & Yoana Martínez - women's singles.

Athlete	Event	Round of 64	Round of 32	Round of 16	Quarterfinal	Semifinal	Final / BM	
Athlete	Event	Opposition Score	Opposition Score	Opposition Score	Opposition Score	Opposition Score	Opposition Score	Rank
Pablo Abián	Men's singles	Navickas (LTU); L 21–23, 12–21, 9–21	Did not advance					
Yoana Martínez	Women's singles	Carroll (AUS); W 21–9, 21–16	Yulianti (INA); L 9–21, 14–21	Did not advance				

== Basketball ==
Spain's men's basketball team qualified for the Olympics as the reigning world champion in the 2006 FIBA World Championship. On the other hand, the women's team finished second at the EuroBasket Women 2007, and qualified for the final five Olympic spots at the FIBA World Olympic Qualifying Tournament for Women 2008.

2008 Summer Olympics Spanish basketball team 'slanty-eye' photo incident

Both men and women 2008 Summer Olympics Spanish basketball teams were a part of the 'slanty-eye' gesture photo incident that took place before the Beijing Olympics. The photo was a feature ad as a newspaper spread in Spain, showing all players using their fingers to apparently make their eyes look more Chinese (Epicanthic fold) on a basketball court adorned with a Chinese dragon. The photo was part of a publicity campaign for team sponsor Seur and was used only in Spain.

"It was something like supposed to be funny or something but never offensive in any way", said forward Pau Gasol. "I'm sorry if anybody thought or took it the wrong way and thought that it was offensive."

Guard José Calderón said the team was responding to a request from the photographer. "We felt it was something appropriate, and that it would be interpreted as an affectionate gesture", said Calderón. "Without a doubt, some ... press didn't see it that way."

=== Men's tournament ===
Roster

The following is the Spain roster in the men's basketball tournament of the 2008 Summer Olympics.

Spain men's national basketball team – 2008 Summer Olympics roster
Players
Coaches

Pos.	No.	Name	Age – Date of birth	Height	Club	Ctr.
F/C	4	Pau Gasol	28 – July 6, 1980	7 ft 0 in (2.13 m)	Los Angeles Lakers	(United States)
G/F	5	Rudy Fernandez	23 – April 4, 1985	6 ft 6 in (1.98 m)	Portland Trail Blazers	(United States)
PG	6	Ricky Rubio	17 – October 21, 1990	6 ft 4 in (1.93 m)	Joventut Badalona	(Spain)
G	7	Juan Carlos Navarro	28 – June 13, 1980	6 ft 4 in (1.93 m)	FC Barcelona	(Spain)
PG	8	José Calderón	26 – September 28, 1981	6 ft 3 in (1.91 m)	Toronto Raptors	(Canada)
F/C	9	Felipe Reyes	28 – March 16, 1980	6 ft 9 in (2.06 m)	Real Madrid	(Spain)
SF	10	Carlos Jiménez (C)	32 – February 10, 1976	6 ft 9 in (2.06 m)	CB Málaga	(Spain)
PG	11	Raül López	28 – April 15, 1980	6 ft 0 in (1.83 m)	Real Madrid	(Spain)
SG	12	Berni Rodríguez	28 – June 7, 1980	6 ft 5 in (1.96 m)	CB Málaga	(Spain)
C	13	Marc Gasol	23 – January 29, 1985	7 ft 1 in (2.16 m)	Memphis Grizzlies	(United States)
SF	14	Álex Mumbrú	29 – June 12, 1979	6 ft 7 in (2.01 m)	Real Madrid	(Spain)
PF	15	Jorge Garbajosa	30 – December 19, 1977	6 ft 9 in (2.06 m)	Khimki BC	(Russia)

Head coach

- (Spain) Aíto García Reneses

Assistant coach(es)

- (Spain) Juan Antonio Orenga
- (Spain) Quim Costa

Legend

- (C) Team captain
- Club – describes last
  club before the tournament
- Age – describes age
  on August 9, 2008

Group play

Pos	Team	Pld	W	L	PF	PA	PD	Pts	Qualification
1	United States	5	5	0	515	354	+161	10	Quarterfinals
2	Spain	5	4	1	418	369	+49	9	Quarterfinals
3	Greece	5	3	2	415	375	+40	8	Quarterfinals
4	China (H)	5	2	3	366	400	−34	7	Quarterfinals
5	Germany	5	1	4	330	390	−60	6	
6	Angola	5	0	5	321	477	−156	5	

Source: FIBA archive
Rules for classification: 1) points; 2) head-to-head points; 3) head-to-head goal average; 4) head-to-head number of points scored.
(H) Hosts

10 August 2008
14:30

Report

Spain	81–66	Greece
Scoring by quarter: 20–16, 15–13, 27–17, 19–20
Pts: Fernández 16; Rebs: P. Gasol 7 Asts: Navarro, Rodríguez 2		Pts: Spanoulis 15; Rebs: Tsartsaris 8 Asts: Diamantidis 3

Wukesong Indoor Stadium, Beijing
Attendance: 11,083
Referees: Reynaldo Mercedes (DOM)

12 August 2008
16:45

Report

China	75–85 (OT)	Spain
Scoring by quarter: 18–20, 28–17, 15–10, 11–25, Overtime: 3–13
Pts: Liu 19; Rebs: Yao, Yi 9 Asts: Yao, Sun 3		Pts: P. Gasol 29; Rebs: P. Gasol, Fernández 8 Asts: Fernández 6

Wukesong Indoor Stadium, Beijing
Attendance: 11,083
Referees: José Carrión (PUR)

14 August 2008
09:00

Report

Germany	59–72	Spain
Scoring by quarter: 15–12, 21–27, 12–20, 11–13
Pts: Hamann 15; Rebs: Kaman 10; Asts: Hamann 3		Pts: Calderón 15; Rebs: M. Gasol 8 Asts: P. Gasol, Rubio 3

Wukesong Indoor Stadium, Beijing
Attendance: 11,083
Referees: Fabio Facchini (ITA)

16 August 2008
22:15

Report

Spain	82–119	United States
Scoring by quarter: 22–31, 23–30, 18–25, 19–33
Pts: Reyes 19; Rebs: Reyes 8 Asts: Fernández, Rubio 3		Pts: James 18; Rebs: Bosh 7 Asts: James, Paul 8

Wukesong Indoor Stadium, Beijing
Attendance: 11,083
Referees: Romualdas Brazauskas (LTU)

18 August 2008
16:45

Report

Angola	50–98	Spain
Scoring by quarter: 23–15, 7–25, 11–31, 9–27
Pts: Mingas 10; Rebs: Mingas, Ambrosio 5 Asts: Costa 5		Pts: P. Gasol 31; Rebs: P. Gasol 9 Asts: Rodríguez, Rubio 5

Wukesong Indoor Stadium, Beijing
Attendance: 11,083
Referees: Eddie Rush (USA)

Quarterfinals

20 August 2008
14:30

Report

Spain	72–59	Croatia
Scoring by quarter: 22–11, 15–15, 14–12, 21–21
Scoring by half: 37–26, 35–33
Pts: P. Gasol 20; Rebs: P. Gasol 10; Asts: Calderón, P. Gasol 2		Pts: Banić 15; Rebs: Banić, Planinić 5 Asts: Kus, Nicević 2

Wukesong Indoor Stadium, Beijing
Attendance: 11,083
Referees: Nikolaos Zavlanos (GRE)

Semifinals

22 August 2008
20:00

Report

Spain	91–86	Lithuania
Scoring by quarter: 21–19, 19–23, 22–24, 29–20
Scoring by half: 40–42, 51–44
Pts: P Gasol 19; Rebs: Jiménez 7 Asts: Rubio 4		Pts: Jasaitis, Jasikevičius 19; Rebs: Jasaitis 8 Asts: Jasikevičius 6

Wukesong Indoor Stadium, Beijing
Attendance: 11,083
Referees: Nikolaos Pitsilkas (GRE)

Gold medal match

24 August 2008
14:00

Report

(silver) Spain	107–118	United States (gold)
Scoring by quarter: 31–38, 30–31, 21–22, 25–27
Scoring by half: 61–69, 46–49
Pts: Fernández 22; Rebs: Reyes 7 Asts: Navarro 4		Pts: Wade 27; Rebs: Bosh 7 Asts: Bryant 6

Wukesong Indoor Stadium, Beijing
Attendance: 11,083
Referees: Romualdas Brazauskas (LTU), Pablo Estévez (ARG), Carl Jungebrand (FIN)

=== Women's tournament ===
Roster

The following is the Spain roster in the women's basketball tournament of the 2008 Summer Olympics.

Spain women's national basketball team – 2008 Summer Olympics roster
Players
Coaches

Pos.	No.	Name	Age – Date of birth	Height	Club	Ctr.
PF	4	Laura Nicholls	19 – February 26, 1989	6 ft 2 in (1.88 m)	Celta Vigourban	(Spain)
C	5	Cindy Lima	27 – June 21, 1981	6 ft 4 in (1.93 m)	CB San José	(Spain)
PF	6	Tamara Abalde	19 – February 6, 1989	6 ft 4 in (1.93 m)	Lamar Cardinals	(United States)
SG	7	Isabel Sánchez	20 – September 16, 1987	5 ft 10 in (1.78 m)	Perfumerias Avenida Salamanca	(Spain)
C	8	Lucila Pascua	25 – March 21, 1983	6 ft 5 in (1.96 m)	CB San José	(Spain)
SG	9	Laia Palau	28 – September 10, 1979	5 ft 9 in (1.75 m)	Ros Casares Valencia	(Spain)
PG	10	Elisa Aguilar	31 – October 15, 1976	5 ft 8 in (1.73 m)	Ros Casares Valencia	(Spain)
G	11	Nuria Martínez	24 – February 29, 1984	5 ft 9 in (1.75 m)	Dynamo Moscow	(Russia)
PF	12	Anna Montañana	27 – October 24, 1980	6 ft 1 in (1.85 m)	Perfumerias Avenida Salamanca	(Spain)
SF	13	Amaya Valdemoro (C)	31 – August 18, 1976	6 ft 0 in (1.83 m)	CSKA Samara	(Russia)
SF	14	María Revuelto	26 – January 27, 1982	6 ft 0 in (1.83 m)	CB San José	(Spain)
SG	15	Alba Torrens	18 – August 30, 1989	6 ft 3 in (1.91 m)	Celta Vigourban	(Spain)

Head coach

- (Spain) Evaristo Pérez

Assistant coach(es)

- (Spain) Víctor Lapeña
- (Spain) Susana García

Legend

- (C) Team captain
- Club – describes last
  club before the tournament
- Age – describes age
  on August 9, 2008

Group play

Pos	Team	Pld	W	L	PF	PA	PD	Pts	Qualification
1	United States	5	5	0	491	276	+215	10	Quarterfinals
2	China (H)	5	4	1	358	346	+12	9	Quarterfinals
3	Spain	5	3	2	357	324	+33	8	Quarterfinals
4	Czech Republic	5	2	3	346	356	−10	7	Quarterfinals
5	New Zealand	5	1	4	320	423	−103	6	
6	Mali	5	0	5	255	402	−147	5	

Source: FIBA archive
Rules for classification: 1) points; 2) head-to-head points; 3) head-to-head points difference; 4) head-to-head number of points scored.
(H) Hosts

9 August 2008
14:30

Report

China	67–64	Spain
Scoring by quarter: 18–15, 19–9, 15–20, 15–20
Pts: Bian 15; Rebs: Bian 12; Asts: Miao 3		Pts: Torrens 18; Rebs: Montañana 7 Asts: Palau 4

Wukesong Indoor Stadium, Beijing
Attendance: 11,083
Referees: Jose Carrion (PUR)

11 August 2008
09:00

Report

New Zealand	62–85	Spain
Scoring by quarter: 7–18, 20–22, 20–20, 15–25
Pts: Harmon 22; Rebs: Wallbutton 6 Asts: Harmon 3		Pts: Sanchez 19; Rebs: Montañana 7 Asts: Aguilar, Sánchez, Torrens 2

Wukesong Indoor Stadium, Beijing
Attendance: 11,083
Referees: Abreu Muhimua (MOZ)

13 August 2008
11:15

Report

Spain	74–55	Czech Republic
Scoring by quarter: 15–21, 13–6, 30–11, 16–17
Pts: Montañana 20; Rebs: Pascua 8 Asts: Palau 5		Pts: Viteckova 12; Rebs: Machová 8 Asts: Machová 5

Wukesong Indoor Stadium, Beijing
Attendance: 11,083
Referees: Carl Jungebrand (FIN)

15 August 2008
20:00

Report

United States	93–55	Spain
Scoring by quarter: 22–17, 17–17, 23–10, 31–11
Pts: Thompson 17; Rebs: Leslie 11; Asts: Lawson, Leslie, Parker 2		Pts: Valdemoro 17; Rebs: Nicholls 5 Asts: Martínez 2

Wukesong Indoor Stadium, Beijing
Attendance: 11,083
Referees: Fabio Facchini (ITA)

17 August 2008
09:00

Report

Mali	47–79	Spain
Scoring by quarter: 5–19, 16–17, 12–22, 13–21
Pts: Sissoko 17; Rebs: Diawara 15; Asts: Diawara, Kanouté 2		Pts: Valdemoro 21; Rebs: Montañana 9 Asts: Montañana, Aguilar, Lima, Martínez 4

Wukesong Indoor Stadium, Beijing
Attendance: 11,083
Referees: Elena Chernova (RUS)

Quarterfinals

19 August 2008
22:15

Report

Russia	84–65	Spain
Scoring by quarter: 10–21, 22–19, 24–15, 28–10
Pts: Shchegoleva 19; Rebs: Stepanova 10; Asts: Rakhmatulina 4		Pts: Valdemoro 16; Rebs: Pascua 6 Asts: Valdemoro, Palau, Torrens 1

Wukesong Indoor Stadium, Beijing
Attendance: 11,083
Referees: Ilija Belosevic (SRB)

== Boxing ==
Spain qualified one boxer for the Olympic boxing tournament. Kelvin de la Nieve earned a qualifying spot at the second European qualifying tournament.

Athlete	Event	Round of 32	Round of 16	Quarterfinals	Semifinals	Final	
Athlete	Event	Opposition Result	Opposition Result	Opposition Result	Opposition Result	Opposition Result	Rank
Kelvin de la Nieve	Light flyweight	Yanez (USA); L 9–12	Did not advance				

== Canoeing ==
=== Slalom ===
Spain sent three people, two men and one woman, to compete in the slalom events at the 2008 Summer Olympics.

Athlete	Event	Preliminary						Semifinal		Final			
Athlete	Event	Run 1	Rank	Run 2	Rank	Total	Rank	Time	Rank	Time	Rank	Total	Rank
Guillermo Díez-Canedo	Men's K-1	84.95	4	88.07	13	173.02	12 Q	90.06	14	Did not advance			
Ander Elosegi	Men's C-1	87.00	4	85.47	4	176.45	7 Q	91.16	5 Q	89.93	4	180.59	4
Maialen Chourraut	Women's K-1	147.95	17	105.44	12	253.39	16	Did not advance					

=== Sprint ===
Men

Athlete	Event	Heats		Semifinals		Final	
Athlete	Event	Time	Rank	Time	Rank	Time	Rank
David Cal	C-1 500 m	1.47:995	1 QF	Bye		1:48.397	2nd place, silver medalist(s)
David Cal	C-1 1000 m	3.58:756	1 QF	Bye		3:52.751	2nd place, silver medalist(s)
Saúl Craviotto; Carlos Pérez Rial	K-2 500 m	1:28.983	2 QF	Bye		1:28.736	1st place, gold medalist(s)

Women

Athlete	Event	Heats		Semifinals		Final	
Athlete	Event	Time	Rank	Time	Rank	Time	Rank
Maria Teresa Portela	K-1 500 m	1:51.654	2 QS	1:54.981	6	Did not advance	
Beatriz Manchón; Sonia Molanes	K-2 500 m	1:46.646	5 QS	1:45.313	4	Did not advance	
Beatriz Manchón; Sonia Molanes; Maria Teresa Portela; Jana Smidakova	K-4 500 m	1:37.914	4 QS	1:37.172	1 Q	1:35.366	5

Qualification Legend: QS = Qualify to semi-final; QF = Qualify directly to final

== Cycling ==
=== Road ===
Men

Athlete	Event	Time	Rank
Alberto Contador	Road race	Did not finish	
Alberto Contador	Time trial	1:03:29	4
Óscar Freire	Road race	Did not finish	
Samuel Sánchez	Road race	6:23:49	1st place, gold medalist(s)
Samuel Sánchez	Time trial	1:04:37	6
Carlos Sastre	Road race	6:31:06	49
Alejandro Valverde	Road race	6:24:19	13

Women

Athlete	Event	Time	Rank
Anna Sanchis	Road race	3:32:52	19
Marta Vilajosana	Road race	3:43:25	25

=== Track ===
Pursuit

Athlete	Event	Qualification		Semifinals		Final	
Athlete	Event	Time	Rank	Opponent Results	Rank	Opponent Results	Rank
Sergi Escobar	Men's individual pursuit	4:26.102	10	Did not advance			
Antonio Tauler	Men's individual pursuit	4:22.462	6 Q	Markov (RUS); 4:24.974	6	Did not advance	
Sergi Escobar; Asier Maeztu; Antonio Miguel Parra; David Muntaner	Men's team pursuit	4:06.509	7 Q	New Zealand; LAP	—	Did not advance	

Omnium

Athlete	Event	Points	Laps	Rank
Joan Llaneras	Men's points race	60	2	1st place, gold medalist(s)
Leire Olaberría	Women's points race	13	0	3rd place, bronze medalist(s)
Joan Llaneras; Antonio Tauler	Men's madison	7	0	2nd place, silver medalist(s)

=== Mountain biking ===
Athlete	Event	Time	Rank
Carlos Coloma Nicolás	Men's cross-country	2:09:05	28
José Antonio Hermida	Men's cross-country	2:01:01	10
Iñaki Lejarreta	Men's cross-country	2:00:21	8
Margarita Fullana	Women's cross-country	Did not finish	

== Diving ==
Spain sent one man and one woman to compete at the 2008 Summer Olympics.

Men

Athlete	Events	Preliminaries		Semifinals		Final	
Athlete	Events	Points	Rank	Points	Rank	Points	Rank
Javier Illana	3 m springboard	423.90	20	Did not advance			

Women

Athlete	Events	Preliminaries		Semifinals		Final	
Athlete	Events	Points	Rank	Points	Rank	Points	Rank
Jenifer Benítez	3 m springboard	194.05	30	Did not advance			

== Equestrian ==
Spain sent two men and one woman to compete in equestrian events at the 2008 Summer Olympics, however Beatriz Ferrer-Salat, and therefore dressage team, were unable to compete because Beatriz's horse, Fabergé, suffered an injury shortly before the start of the games.

=== Dressage ===
Athlete	Horse	Event	Grand Prix		Grand Prix Special		Grand Prix Freestyle		Overall	
Athlete	Horse	Event	Score	Rank	Score	Rank	Score	Rank	Score	Rank
Jordi Domingo	Prestige	Individual	64.042	28	Did not advance					
Beatriz Ferrer-Salat	Fabergé	Individual	DNS		Did not advance					
Juan Manuel Muñoz	Fuego XII	Individual	66.083	22 Q	68.160	16	Did not advance			
Jordi Domingo; Beatriz Ferrer-Salat; Juan Manuel Muñoz	See above	Team	—N/a						DNS	

== Fencing ==
Men

Athlete	Event	Round of 64	Round of 32	Round of 16	Quarterfinal	Semifinal	Final / BM	
Athlete	Event	Opposition Score	Opposition Score	Opposition Score	Opposition Score	Opposition Score	Opposition Score	Rank
José Luis Abajo	Individual épée	Bye	Kim W-J (KOR); W 15–14	Jeannet (FRA); W 15–9	Confalonieri (ITA); W 14–13	Tagliariol (ITA); L 12–15	Boczkó (HUN); W 8–7	3rd place, bronze medalist(s)
Javier Menéndez	Individual foil	—N/a	Schlosser (AUT); L 9–15	Did not advance				
Jaime Martí	Individual sabre	Bye	Kovalev (RUS); W 15–12	Zhong M (CHN); L 14–15	Did not advance			
Jorge Pina	Individual sabre	Bye	Occhiuzzi (ITA); W 15–9	Montano (ITA); W 15–14	Lopez (FRA); L 10–15	Did not advance		

Women

Athlete	Event	Round of 64	Round of 32	Round of 16	Quarterfinal	Semifinal	Final / BM	
Athlete	Event	Opposition Score	Opposition Score	Opposition Score	Opposition Score	Opposition Score	Opposition Score	Rank
Araceli Navarro	Individual sabre	Larios (MEX); W 15–4	Ward (USA); L 7–12	Did not advance				

== Field hockey ==
=== Men's tournament ===
Roster

The following is the Spanish roster in the men's field hockey tournament of the 2008 Summer Olympics.

Head Coach: Maurits Hendriks

1. Francisco Cortes (GK)
2. Santi Freixa
5. Francisco Fábregas (c)
6. Víctor Sojo
8. Alexandre Fabregas
9. Pablo Amat
10. Eduardo Tubau
11. Roc Oliva
12. Juan Fernandez
13. Ramón Alegre
16. Xavier Ribas
17. Albert Sala
18. Rodrigo Garza
20. Sergi Enrique
21. Eduard Arbos
23. David Alegre

Reserve:

3. Franc Dinares
22. Xavier Castillano (GK)

Group play

Pos	Team	Pld	W	D	L	GF	GA	GD	Pts	Qualification
1	Spain	5	4	0	1	9	5	+4	12	Semi-finals
2	Germany	5	3	2	0	12	6	+6	11	Semi-finals
3	South Korea	5	2	1	2	13	11	+2	7	Fifth place game
4	New Zealand	5	2	1	2	10	9	+1	7	Seventh place game
5	Belgium	5	1	1	3	9	13	−4	4	Ninth place game
6	China (H)	5	0	1	4	7	16	−9	1	Eleventh place game

(H) Hosts

11 August 2008
20:30

Spain	4–2	Belgium
Amat 8'; Freixa 20'; Ribas 41'; Sojo 49'	Report	Truyens 26'; Dekeyser 63'

Umpires:
Murray Grime (AUS)
Roel van Eert (NED)

13 August 2008
20:30

New Zealand	0–1	Spain
	Report	Freixa 70'

Umpires:
John Wright (RSA)
Christian Blasch (GER)

15 August 2008
08:30

Spain	2–1	China
Ribas 17'; Amat 67'	Report	Na Yubo 6'

Umpires:
David Gentles (AUS)
Kim Hong-lae (KOR)

17 August 2008
21:00

Germany	1–0	Spain
Fürste 34'	Report

Umpires:
John Wright (RSA)
David Gentles (AUS)

19 August 2008
18:30

South Korea	1–2	Spain
Yoon Sung-hoon 69'	Report	Freixa 12', 53'

Umpires:
Henrik Ehlers (DEN)
John Wright (USA)

Semifinals

21 August 2008
20:30

Spain	3−2	Australia
Tubau 39', 44'; Freixa 68'	Report	Abbott 1'; Ockenden 37'

Umpires:
Henrik Ehlers (DEN)
Christian Blasch (GER)

Gold medal match

23 August 2008
20:30

(gold) Germany	1–0	Spain (silver)
C. Zeller 16'	Report

Umpires:
Henrik Ehlers (DEN)
David Gentles (AUS)

=== Women's tournament ===
Roster

The following is the Spanish roster in the women's field hockey tournament of the 2008 Summer Olympics.

Head Coach: Pablo Usoz

1. María Jesús Rosa (GK)
2. Julia Menéndez
3. Rocío Ybarra
7. Bárbara Malda
9. Silvia Muñoz (c)
10. Silvia Bonastre
11. María Romagosa
12. Marta Ejarque
13. Raquel Huertas
14. Pilar Sánchez
17. Núria Camón
19. María Lopéz (GK)
20. Montse Cruz
21. Esther Termens
22. Gloria Comerma
23. Georgina Olivia

Reserve:

5. Paula Dabanch
8. Panadero Yurena

Group play

Team	Pld	W	D	L	GF	GA	GD	Pts	Qualification
Netherlands	5	5	0	0	14	3	+11	15	Advanced to semifinals
China	5	3	1	1	14	4	+10	10	Advanced to semifinals
Australia	5	3	1	1	17	9	+8	10	
Spain	5	2	0	3	4	12	−8	6	
South Korea	5	1	0	4	13	18	−5	3	
South Africa	5	0	0	5	2	18	−16	0	

10 August 2008
10:30

China	3–0	Spain
Fu Baorong 17'; Li Hongxia 31'; Gao Lihua 37'	Report

Umpires:
Ute Conen (GER)
Marelize de Clerk (RSA)

12 August 2008
10:30

Australia	6–1	Spain
Lambert 27', 60'; Hudson 47'; Eastham 54'; Halliday 66'; Rivers 70'	Report	Muñoz 6'

Umpires:
Chieko Soma (JPN)
Miao Lin (CHN)

14 August 2008
18:00

Spain	2–1	South Korea
Camón 8'; Sanchez 22'	Report	Kim Jong-eun 37'

Umpires:
Anne McRae (GBR)
Sarah Garnett (NZL)

16 August 2008
21:00

Spain	1–0	South Africa
Romagosa 31'	Report

Umpires:
Lee Keum-ju (KOR)
Gina Spitaleri (ITA)

18 August 2008
18:30

Netherlands	2–0	Spain
Paumen 22'; Hoog 69'	Report

Umpires:
Soledad Iparraguirre (ARG)
Minka Woolley (AUS)

7th–8th place

20 August 2008
11:00

Spain	3–2 (a.e.t.)	United States
Termens 8'; Huertas 68'; Ybarra 84'	Report	Sensenig 30'; Loy 59'

Umpires:
Minka Woolley (AUS)
Ute Conen (GER)

== Gymnastics ==
=== Artistic ===
Men
Team

Athlete	Event	Qualification								Final							
Athlete	Event	Apparatus						Total	Rank	Apparatus						Total	Rank
Athlete	Event	F	PH	R	V	PB	HB	Total	Rank	F	PH	R	V	PB	HB	Total	Rank
Isaac Botella Pérez	Team	14.975	13.600	14.900	16.050 Q	—N/a				Did not advance							
Manuel Carballo	Team	14.650	14.475	14.900	—N/a	15.275	13.025	—N/a		Did not advance							
Gervasio Deferr	Team	15.825 Q	—N/a		15.075	14.600	13.725	—N/a		Did not advance							
Rafael Martínez	Team	15.750	15.550	14.800	14.325	15.100	15.275	90.800	10 Q	Did not advance							
Sergio Muñoz	Team	14.575	12.700	15.150	16.100	13.675	13.300	85.500	40	Did not advance							
Iván San Miguel	Team	—N/a	13.775	15.200	16.050	14.375	14.525	—N/a		Did not advance							
Total	Team	61.000	56.650	60.150	63.950	59.350	56.825	357.925	11	Did not advance							

Individual finals

Athlete	Event	Apparatus						Total	Rank
Athlete	Event	F	PH	R	V	PB	HB	Total	Rank
Isaac Botella Pérez	Vault	—N/a			16.075	—N/a		16.075	8
Gervasio Deferr	Floor	15.775	—N/a					15.775	2nd place, silver medalist(s)
Rafael Martínez	All-around	15.450	15.000	14.375	15.575	15.525	15.575	91.500	10

Women

Athlete	Event	Qualification						Final					
Athlete	Event	Apparatus				Total	Rank	Apparatus				Total	Rank
Athlete	Event	F	V	UB	BB	Total	Rank	F	V	UB	BB	Total	Rank
Laura Campos	All-around	13.775	14.200	13.075	13.975	55.025	49	Did not advance					
Lenika de Simone	All-around	13.850	14.100	13.550	14.100	55.600	47	Did not advance					

=== Rhythmic ===
Athlete	Event	Qualification						Final					
Athlete	Event	Rope	Hoop	Clubs	Ribbon	Total	Rank	Rope	Hoop	Clubs	Ribbon	Total	Rank
Almudena Cid Tostado	Individual	16.675	16.800	16.600	16.750	66.825	10 Q	17.000	17.000	17.150	16.950	68.100	8

Athlete	Event	Qualification				Final			
Athlete	Event	5 ropes	3 hoops & 2 clubs	Total	Rank	5 ropes	3 hoops & 2 clubs	Total	Rank
Bárbara González; Lara González; Isabel Pagán; Ana Pelaz; Verónica Ruiz; Elisabet Salom	Team	15.725	14.375	30.100	11	Did not advance			

== Handball ==
=== Men's tournament ===
Roster

The following is the Spain roster in the men's handball tournament of the 2008 Summer Olympics.

Head coach: Juan Carlos Pastor

No.	Pos.	Name	Date of birth (age)	Height	App.	Goals	Club
1	GK	Jose Javier Hombrados	7 April 1972 (aged 36)	1.97 m	175	1	(Spain) BM Ciudad Real
2	LB	Alberto Entrerrios	7 November 1976 (aged 31)	1.92 m	164	505	(Spain) BM Ciudad Real
4	RW	Albert Rocas	16 June 1982 (aged 26)	1.88 m	68	275	(Spain) FC Barcelona Handbol
5	CB	Raul Entrerrios	12 February 1981 (aged 27)	1.85 m	83	180	(Spain) BM Valladolid
6	P	Ruben Garabaya	15 September 1978 (aged 29)	2.01 m	98	212	(Spain) FC Barcelona Handbol
7	P	Carlos Prieto	2 February 1980 (aged 28)	2.04 m	66	73	(Spain) BM Valladolid
8	RB	Jon Belaustegui	19 March 1979 (aged 29)	1.95 m	83	185	(Spain) CB Ciudad de Logroño
11	LB	Demetrio Lozano	26 September 1975 (aged 32)	1.96 m	210	449	(Spain) FC Barcelona Handbol
15	LW	David Davis	25 October 1976 (aged 31)	1.85 m	78	115	(Spain) BM Ciudad Real
16	GK	David Barrufet	4 June 1970 (aged 38)	1.97 m	259	1	(Spain) FC Barcelona Handbol
17	LW	Juanín García	28 August 1977 (aged 30)	1.76 m	128	508	(Spain) FC Barcelona Handbol
18	LB	Iker Romero	15 June 1980 (aged 28)	1.96 m	127	480	(Spain) FC Barcelona Handbol
21	RB	Cristian Malmagro	11 March 1983 (aged 25)	1.97 m	13	33	(Spain) SDC San Antonio
27	RW	Víctor Tomás	15 February 1985 (aged 23)	1.76 m	23	70	(Spain) FC Barcelona Handbol

Group play

Team	Pld	W	D	L	GF	GA	GD	Pts	Qualification
France	5	4	1	0	148	115	+33	9	Qualified for the quarterfinals
Poland	5	3	1	1	147	128	+19	7	Qualified for the quarterfinals
Croatia	5	3	0	2	140	115	+25	6	Qualified for the quarterfinals
Spain	5	3	0	2	152	145	+7	6	Qualified for the quarterfinals
Brazil	5	1	0	4	129	153	−24	2	
China	5	0	0	5	104	164	−60	0	

10 August 2008; 09:00	Croatia	31 – 29	Spain	Olympic Sports Centre Gymnasium; Referees: Lemme, Ulrich (GER)
10 August 2008; 09:00	Lacković, Džomba 5	(16–11)	García 5	Olympic Sports Centre Gymnasium; Referees: Lemme, Ulrich (GER)
10 August 2008; 09:00	4× (yellow card) 4× (suspension)	Report	3× (yellow card) 3× (suspension)	Olympic Sports Centre Gymnasium; Referees: Lemme, Ulrich (GER)

12 August 2008; 15:45	Spain	30 – 29	Poland	Olympic Sports Centre Gymnasium; Referees: Chernega, Poladenko (RUS)
12 August 2008; 15:45	Rocas 7	(16–17)	Jurasik, Lijewski 4	Olympic Sports Centre Gymnasium; Referees: Chernega, Poladenko (RUS)
12 August 2008; 15:45	3× (yellow card) 1× (suspension)	Report	4× (yellow card) 5× (suspension)	Olympic Sports Centre Gymnasium; Referees: Chernega, Poladenko (RUS)

14 August 2008; 15:45	China	22 – 36	Spain	Olympic Sports Centre Gymnasium; Referees: Elmoamli, Shaban Ali (EGY)
14 August 2008; 15:45	Cui 5	(12–16)	Tomás 7	Olympic Sports Centre Gymnasium; Referees: Elmoamli, Shaban Ali (EGY)
14 August 2008; 15:45	3× (yellow card) 2× (suspension)	Report	3× (yellow card) 1× (suspension)	Olympic Sports Centre Gymnasium; Referees: Elmoamli, Shaban Ali (EGY)

16 August 2008; 14:00	France	28 – 21	Spain	Olympic Sports Centre Gymnasium; Referees: Lemme, Ullrich (GER)
16 August 2008; 14:00	Gille 6	(16–10)	García 7	Olympic Sports Centre Gymnasium; Referees: Lemme, Ullrich (GER)
16 August 2008; 14:00	3× (yellow card) 3× (suspension)	Report	3× (yellow card) 3× (suspension)	Olympic Sports Centre Gymnasium; Referees: Lemme, Ullrich (GER)

18 August 2008; 10:45	Spain	36 – 35	Brazil	Olympic Sports Centre Gymnasium; Referees: Baum, Goralczyk (POL)
18 August 2008; 10:45	Romero 8	(20–17)	Pacheco Filho 12	Olympic Sports Centre Gymnasium; Referees: Baum, Goralczyk (POL)
18 August 2008; 10:45	3× (yellow card) 4× (suspension) 1× (red card)	Report	3× (yellow card) 3× (suspension) 1× (red card)	Olympic Sports Centre Gymnasium; Referees: Baum, Goralczyk (POL)

Quarterfinal

20 August 2008; 20:15	South Korea	24 – 29	Spain	Olympic Sports Centre Gymnasium; Referees: Gjeding, Hansen (DEN)
20 August 2008; 20:15	Jeong Yi-kyeong 7	(13–14)	Rocas 8	Olympic Sports Centre Gymnasium; Referees: Gjeding, Hansen (DEN)
20 August 2008; 20:15	3× (yellow card) 3× (suspension)	Report	2× (yellow card) 5× (suspension)	Olympic Sports Centre Gymnasium; Referees: Gjeding, Hansen (DEN)

Semifinal

22 August 2008; 20:15	Iceland	36 – 30	Spain	Beijing National Indoor Stadium; Referees: Krstic, Ljubic (SLO)
22 August 2008; 20:15	Sigurðsson, Geirsson 7	(17–15)	Rocas 7	Beijing National Indoor Stadium; Referees: Krstic, Ljubic (SLO)
22 August 2008; 20:15	4× (yellow card) 9× (suspension)	Report	3× (yellow card) 5× (suspension) 1× (red card)	Beijing National Indoor Stadium; Referees: Krstic, Ljubic (SLO)

Bronze medal game

24 August 2008; 13:30	Croatia	29 – 35	Spain	Beijing National Indoor Stadium; Referees: Din, Dinu (ROU)
24 August 2008; 13:30	Duvnjak 7	(14–12)	García, Prieto 7	Beijing National Indoor Stadium; Referees: Din, Dinu (ROU)
24 August 2008; 13:30	3× (yellow card) 4× (suspension)	Report	3× (yellow card) 5× (suspension)	Beijing National Indoor Stadium; Referees: Din, Dinu (ROU)

Final rank

Bronze

== Judo ==
Men

Athlete	Event	Preliminary	Round of 32	Round of 16	Quarterfinals	Semifinals	Repechage 1	Repechage 2	Repechage 3	Final / BM	
Athlete	Event	Opposition Result	Opposition Result	Opposition Result	Opposition Result	Opposition Result	Opposition Result	Opposition Result	Opposition Result	Opposition Result	Rank
Óscar Peñas	−66 kg	Bye	Sharipov (UZB); L 0000–1010	Did not advance							
David Alarza	−90 kg	Bye	Chiclana (PUR); W 1101–0100	Benikhlef (ALG); L 0001–1020	Did not advance		El Assri (MAR); L 0000–0000 YUS	Did not advance			

Women

Athlete	Event	Round of 32	Round of 16	Quarterfinals	Semifinals	Repechage 1	Repechage 2	Repechage 3	Final / BM	
Athlete	Event	Opposition Result	Opposition Result	Opposition Result	Opposition Result	Opposition Result	Opposition Result	Opposition Result	Opposition Result	Rank
Ana Carrascosa	−52 kg	Bundmaa (MGL); W 0100–0000	Xian Dm (CHN); L 0000–1000	Did not advance		Bye	Monteiro (POR); W 0101–0001	Kim K-O (KOR); L 0001–1010	Did not advance	
Isabel Fernández	−57 kg	Bye	Gotay (USA); W 0010–0000	Gravenstijn (NED); L 0000–0001	Did not advance	Bye	Quadros (BRA); L 0000–0001	Did not advance		
Leire Iglesias	−70 kg	Aguiar (BRA); W 0020–0011	Émane (FRA); W 0001–0000	Böhm (GER); L 0000–1000	Did not advance	Bye	Smal (UKR); W 0011–0000	Alvear (COL); W 0001–0000	Bosch (NED); L 0000–1001	5
Esther San Miguel	−78 kg	Moskalyuk (RUS); W 0002–0000	Silva (BRA); W 0011–0010	Morico (ITA); W 0220–0011	Yang Xl (CHN); W 1031–0000	Bye			Possamaï (FRA); W 0010–0100	5

== Modern pentathlon ==
Spain will send one man to compete at the modern pentathlon: Jaime López

Athlete	Event	Shooting (10 m air pistol)			Fencing (épée one touch)			Swimming (200 m freestyle)			Riding (show jumping)			Running (3000 m)			Total points	Final rank
Athlete	Event	Points	Rank	MP Points	Results	Rank	MP points	Time	Rank	MP points	Penalties	Rank	MP points	Time	Rank	MP Points	Total points	Final rank
Jaime López	Men's	183	13	1132	17–18	=19	808	2:07.02	20	1276	DNF	=35	0	10:05.80	35	980	4196	36

== Rowing ==
Spain send one rower to the 2008 Summer Olympics – Nuria Domínguez. She competed in the women's singles event. This was her third Olympic appearance as she rowed in the 1996 Summer Olympics and the 2004 Summer Olympics.

Women

Athlete	Event	Heats		Quarterfinals		Semifinals		Final	
Athlete	Event	Time	Rank	Time	Rank	Time	Rank	Time	Rank
Nuria Domínguez	Single sculls	7:58.03	3 QF	7:49.60	4 SC/D	8:03.61	2 FC	7:36.12	14

Qualification Legend: FA=Final A (medal); FB=Final B (non-medal); FC=Final C (non-medal); FD=Final D (non-medal); FE=Final E (non-medal); FF=Final F (non-medal); SA/B=Semifinals A/B; SC/D=Semifinals C/D; SE/F=Semifinals E/F; QF=Quarterfinals; R=Repechage

== Sailing ==
Spain qualified in 10 Olympic sailing classes and will be sending 16 athletes to the races in Qingdao, China.

Men

Athlete	Event	Race											Net points	Final rank
Athlete	Event	1	2	3	4	5	6	7	8	9	10	M*	Net points	Final rank
Iván Pastor	RS:X	8	13	~~18~~	18	16	9	4	4	6	15	16	109	9
Javier Hernández	Laser	17	25	11	13	28	~~BFD~~	19	13	5	CAN	EL	121	14
Onán Barreiros; Aarón Sarmiento	470	8	2	6	9	13	13	13	4	11	~~18~~	8	87	5

Women

Athlete	Event	Race											Net points	Final rank
Athlete	Event	1	2	3	4	5	6	7	8	9	10	M*	Net points	Final rank
Marina Alabau	RS:X	3	5	5	2	5	~~11~~	8	5	4	9	8	65	4
Susana Romero	Laser Radial	18	7	20	14	20	~~21~~	19	13	16	CAN	EL	127	24
Laia Tutzó; Natalia Vía Dufresne	470	4	5	2	6	13	10	13	~~17~~	2	17	20	92	10
Mónica Azón; Sandra Azón; Graciela Pisonero	Yngling	11	9	~~14~~	6	14	4	14	9	CAN	CAN	EL	67	14

Open

Athlete	Event	Race																Net points	Final rank
Athlete	Event	1	2	3	4	5	6	7	8	9	10	11	12	13	14	15	M*	Net points	Final rank
Rafael Trujillo	Finn	12	4	3	14	20	20	~~OCS~~	1	CAN	CAN	—N/a					6	80	9
Xabier Fernández; Iker Martínez	49er	1	10	17	2	~~OCS~~	5	7	10	3	4	1	2	CAN	CAN	CAN	2	64	2nd place, silver medalist(s)
Fernando Echavarri; Antón Paz	Tornado	1	6	1	4	7	~~13~~	1	7	1	8	—N/a					4	44	1st place, gold medalist(s)

M = Medal race; EL = Eliminated – did not advance into the medal race; CAN = Race cancelled;

== Shooting ==
Men

Athlete	Event	Qualification		Final	
Athlete	Event	Points	Rank	Points	Rank
Juan José Aramburu	Skeet	118 S/O 3	8	Did not advance	
Alberto Fernández	Trap	106	33	Did not advance	
Luis Martínez	10 m air rifle	589	32	Did not advance	
Luis Martínez	50 m rifle prone	582	50	Did not advance	
Mario Núñez	Skeet	115	21	Did not advance	
Jesús Serrano	Trap	116	10	Did not advance	

Women

Athlete	Event	Qualification		Final	
Athlete	Event	Points	Rank	Points	Rank
Maria Pilar Fernandez	10 m air pistol	379	25	Did not advance	
Maria Pilar Fernandez	25 m pistol	582	9	Did not advance	
Sonia Franquet	10 m air pistol	382	14	Did not advance	

== Swimming ==
Men

Athlete	Event	Heat		Semifinal		Final	
Athlete	Event	Time	Rank	Time	Rank	Time	Rank
Melquiades Álvarez	100 m breaststroke	1:01.89	37	Did not advance			
Melquiades Álvarez	200 m breaststroke	2:12.59	27	Did not advance			
Brenton Cabello	200 m individual medley	2:03.08	33	Did not advance			
Sergio García	200 m breaststroke	2:14.30	34	Did not advance			
Francisco Hervás Jodar	10 km open water	—N/a				1:52:16.5	13
Borja Iradier	100 m breaststroke	1:01.83	35	Did not advance			
Rafael Muñoz	100 m butterfly	52.53	30	Did not advance			
Javier Noriega	50 m freestyle	22.33	22	Did not advance			
Javier Núñez	200 m butterfly	2:00.24	32	Did not advance			
Javier Núñez	400 m individual medley	4:22.69	24	—N/a		Did not advance	
Marcos Rivera	1500 m freestyle	15:18.98	26	—N/a		Did not advance	
Aschwin Wildeboer	100 m backstroke	53.67	4 Q	53.51	4 Q	53.51	7
Aschwin Wildeboer	200 m backstroke	DNS		Did not advance			

Women

Athlete	Event	Heat		Semifinal		Final	
Athlete	Event	Time	Rank	Time	Rank	Time	Rank
Mireia Belmonte García	200 m breaststroke	2:29.46	24	Did not advance			
Mireia Belmonte García	200 m butterfly	DNS		Did not advance			
Mireia Belmonte García	200 m individual medley	2:12.75	14 Q	2:13.45	14	Did not advance	
Mireia Belmonte García	400 m individual medley	4:37.91	14	—N/a		Did not advance	
Escarlata Bernard	200 m backstroke	2:12.86	24	Did not advance			
Melania Costa	200 m freestyle	1:59.50	18	Did not advance			
María Fuster	100 m freestyle	DNS		Did not advance			
Lydia Morant	200 m backstroke	2:13.87	25	Did not advance			
María Peláez	200 m individual medley	2:15.97	27	Did not advance			
Mercedes Peris	100 m backstroke	1:02.30	28	Did not advance			
Yurema Requena	10 km open water	—N/a				1:59:46.9	13
Erika Villaécija	400 m freestyle	4:14.25	23	—N/a		Did not advance	
Erika Villaécija	800 m freestyle	8:32.27	16	—N/a		Did not advance	
Nina Zhivanevskaya	100 m backstroke	1:00.54	13 Q	1:00.50	11	Did not advance	
Melania Costa; Noemi Féliz García; María Fuster; Arantxa Ramos; Erika Villaécija	4 × 200 m freestyle relay	8:00.90	14	—N/a		Did not advance	
Mireia Belmonte García; María Fuster; Ángela San Juan; Nina Zhivanevskaya	4 × 100 m medley relay	4:06.40	15	—N/a		Did not advance	

== Synchronized swimming ==
Athlete	Event	Technical routine		Free routine (preliminary)			Free routine (final)		
Athlete	Event	Points	Rank	Points	Total (technical + free)	Rank	Points	Total (technical + free)	Rank
Andrea Fuentes; Gemma Mengual	Duet	48.834	2	49.084	97.918	2 Q	49.500	98.334	2nd place, silver medalist(s)
Alba María Cabello; Raquel Corral; Andrea Fuentes; Gemma Mengual; Thaïs Henríquez; Laura López; Gisela Morón; Irina Rodríguez; Paola Tirados	Team	48.917	2	—N/a			49.334	98.251	2nd place, silver medalist(s)

== Table tennis ==
Singles

Athlete	Event	Preliminary round	Round 1	Round 2	Round 3	Round 4	Quarterfinals	Semifinals	Final / BM	
Athlete	Event	Opposition Result	Opposition Result	Opposition Result	Opposition Result	Opposition Result	Opposition Result	Opposition Result	Opposition Result	Rank
Alfredo Carneros	Men's singles	Massaad (EGY); W 4–2	Kamal (IND); L 2–4	Did not advance						
He Zhi Wen	Men's singles	Bye		Jang S-M (PRK); L 2–4	Did not advance					
Shen Yanfei	Women's singles	Bye		Paović (CRO); W 4–2	Tie Y N (HKG); L 1–4	Did not advance				
Zhu Fang	Women's singles	Bye	Pesotska (UKR); W 4–1	Li J (NED); L 1–4	Did not advance					

Team

Athlete	Event	Group round		Semifinals	Bronze playoff 1	Bronze playoff 2	Bronze medal	Final	
Athlete	Event	Opposition Result	Rank	Opposition Result	Opposition Result	Opposition Result	Opposition Result	Opposition Result	Rank
Galia Dvorak; Shen Yanfei; Zhu Fang	Women's team	Group D South Korea; L 0 – 3 Japan; L 2 – 3 Australia; W 3 – 0	3	Did not advance					

== Taekwondo ==
Athlete	Event	Round of 16	Quarterfinals	Semifinals	Repechage	Bronze Medal	Final	
Athlete	Event	Opposition Result	Opposition Result	Opposition Result	Opposition Result	Opposition Result	Opposition Result	Rank
Juan Antonio Ramos	Men's −58 kg	Martinez (BIZ); W 2–1	Wenceslau (BRA); W 3–2	Mercedes (DOM); L 2–3	Bye	Nikpai (AFG); L 1–4	Did not advance	5
Jon García Aguado	Men's +80 kg	Irgashev (UZB); L 10–11	Did not advance					
Rosana Simon Alamo	Women's +67 kg	Kedzierska (SWE); L 4–5	Did not advance					

== Tennis ==
Men

Athlete	Event	Round of 64	Round of 32	Round of 16	Quarterfinals	Semifinals	Final / BM	
Athlete	Event	Opposition Score	Opposition Score	Opposition Score	Opposition Score	Opposition Score	Opposition Score	Rank
Nicolás Almagro	Singles	Monfils (FRA); L 4–6, 6–3, 4–6	Did not advance					
David Ferrer	Singles	Tipsarević (SRB); L 6–7^{(8–10)}, 2–6	Did not advance					
Rafael Nadal	Singles	Starace (ITA); W 6–2, 3–6, 6–2	Hewitt (AUS); W 6–1, 6–2	Andreev (RUS); W 6–4, 6–2	Melzer (AUT); W 6–0, 6–4	Djokovic (SRB); W 6–4, 1–6, 6–4	González (CHI); W 6–3, 7–6^{(7–2)}, 6–3	1st place, gold medalist(s)
Tommy Robredo	Singles	Seppi (ITA); L 4–6, 6–4, 6–8	Did not advance					
Nicolás Almagro; David Ferrer	Doubles	—N/a	Anderson / Coetzee (RSA); W 3–6, 6–3, 6–4	Aspelin / Johansson (SWE); L 6–7^{(6–8)}, 4–6	Did not advance			
Rafael Nadal; Tommy Robredo	Doubles	—N/a	Björkman / Söderling (SWE); W 6–3, 6–3	Guccione / Hewitt (AUS); L 2–6, 6–7^{(5–7)}	Did not advance			

Women

Athlete	Event	Round of 64	Round of 32	Round of 16	Quarterfinals	Semifinals	Final / BM	
Athlete	Event	Opposition Score	Opposition Score	Opposition Score	Opposition Score	Opposition Score	Opposition Score	Rank
Nuria Llagostera Vives	Singles	Zakopalová (CZE); W 2–6, 6–3, 7–5	Zheng J (CHN); L 7–6^{(9–7)}, 1–6, 4–6	Did not advance				
Anabel Medina Garrigues	Singles	Bammer (AUT); L 2–6, 6–4, 4–6	Did not advance					
Carla Suárez Navarro	Singles	Peng S (CHN); L 5–7, 6–7^{(2–7)}	Did not advance					
María José Martínez Sánchez	Singles	Molik (AUS); W 6–1, 6–1	Safina (RUS); L 6–7^{(3–7)}, 1–6	Did not advance				
Nuria Llagostera Vives; María José Martínez Sánchez	Doubles	—N/a	Vesnina / Zvonareva (RUS); L 6–2, 1–6, 3–6	Did not advance				
Anabel Medina Garrigues; Virginia Ruano Pascual	Doubles	—N/a	Koryttseva / Perebiynis (UKR); W 6–3, 6–4	Stosur / Stubbs (AUS); W 4–6, 6–4, 6–4	Davenport / Huber (USA); W 5–7, 7–6^{(8–6)}, 8–6	Yan Z / Jie Z (CHN); W 6–4, 7–6^{(7–5)}	S Williams / V Williams (USA); L 2–6, 0–6	2nd place, silver medalist(s)

== Triathlon ==
Athlete	Event	Swim (1.5 km)	Trans 1	Bike (40 km)	Trans 2	Run (10 km)	Total Time	Rank
Javier Gómez Noya	Men's	18:08	0:27	59:06	0:29	31:03	1:49:13.92	4
Iván Raña	Men's	18:22	0:26	58:52	0:28	31:14	1:49:22.03	5
Ana Burgos	Women's	20:57	0:31	1:05:28	0:36	35:11	2:02:43.85	20
Ainhoa Murúa	Women's	19:59	0:29	1:07:06	0:36	36:38	2:04:48.07	38

== Volleyball ==
=== Beach ===
Athlete	Event	Preliminary round	Standing	Round of 16	Quarterfinals	Semifinals	Final / BM	
Athlete	Event	Opposition Score	Standing	Opposition Score	Opposition Score	Opposition Score	Opposition Score	Rank
Pablo Herrera; Raúl Mesa	Men's	Pool A Wu – Xu (CHN); L 0 – 2 (13–21, 15–21); Gosch – Horst (AUT); W 2 – 0 (21–14, 21–12); Kais – Vesik (EST); W 2 – 0 (21–18, 23–21)	2 Q	Gibb – Rosenthal (USA); L 0 – 2 (24–26, 17–21)	Did not advance			

== Water polo ==
Only the men's team qualified to play on these Olympic Games. The team finished in fifth place.

=== Men's tournament ===
Roster

The following is the Spanish roster in the men's water polo tournament of the 2008 Summer Olympics.

№	Name	Pos.	Height	Weight	Date of birth	Club
1	Iñaki Aguilar	GK	1.89 m (6 ft 2 in)	81 kg (179 lb)	9 September 1983	(Spain) CN Barcelona
2	Mario José García	CB	1.89 m (6 ft 2 in)	87 kg (192 lb)	15 July 1983	(Spain) CN Alcorcon
3	David Martín	D	1.77 m (5 ft 10 in)	80 kg (180 lb)	2 January 1977	(Spain) CN Atlètic-Barceloneta
4	Ricardo Perrone	D	1.78 m (5 ft 10 in)	76 kg (168 lb)	21 December 1976	(Spain) CN Barcelona
5	Guillermo Molina	D	1.95 m (6 ft 5 in)	112 kg (247 lb)	16 March 1984	(Italy) Brescia
6	Marc Minguell	CB	1.86 m (6 ft 1 in)	90 kg (200 lb)	14 January 1985	(Spain) CN Atlètic-Barceloneta
7	Iván Gallego	CB	1.86 m (6 ft 1 in)	100 kg (220 lb)	13 April 1984	(Spain) CN Terrassa
8	Svilen Piralkov	D	1.89 m (6 ft 2 in)	90 kg (200 lb)	8 April 1975	(Spain) CN Terrassa
9	Xavier Vallès	CF	1.92 m (6 ft 4 in)	102 kg (225 lb)	4 September 1979	(Spain) CN Atlètic-Barceloneta
10	Felipe Perrone	D	1.83 m (6 ft 0 in)	95 kg (209 lb)	27 February 1986	(Italy) Savona
11	Iván Pérez	CF	1.96 m (6 ft 5 in)	110 kg (240 lb)	29 June 1971	(Spain) CN Atlètic-Barceloneta
12	Xavier García	D	1.98 m (6 ft 6 in)	92 kg (203 lb)	5 January 1984	(Spain) CN Atlètic-Barceloneta
13	Ángel Andreo	GK	1.91 m (6 ft 3 in)	84 kg (185 lb)	3 December 1972	(Spain) Waterpolo Zaragoza

Head coach: Rafael Aguilar

Group play

Team	Pld	W	D	L	GF	GA	GD	Pts	Qualification
Hungary	5	4	1	0	60	36	+24	9	Qualified for the semifinals
Spain	5	4	0	1	52	34	+18	8	Qualified for the quarterfinals
Montenegro	5	2	2	1	43	33	+10	6	Qualified for the quarterfinals
Australia	5	2	1	2	45	40	+5	5	Will play for places 7–10
Greece	5	1	0	4	39	56	−17	2	Will play for places 7–12
Canada	5	0	0	5	21	61	−40	0	Will play for places 7–12

All times are China Standard Time (UTC+8).

10 August 2008; 9:30	Report	Spain	16–6	Canada	Ying Tung Natatorium, Beijing; Referees: Ciric (SRB), Ni (CHN)
10 August 2008; 9:30	Report	Score by quarters: 5–2, 4–2, 3–1, 4–1			Ying Tung Natatorium, Beijing; Referees: Ciric (SRB), Ni (CHN)
10 August 2008; 9:30	Report	Molina 3, X. García 3, Piralkov 2, Vallès 2, F. Perrone 2	Goals	Feltham 2	Ying Tung Natatorium, Beijing; Referees: Ciric (SRB), Ni (CHN)

12 August 2008; 10:50	Report	Spain	9–8	Australia	Ying Tung Natatorium, Beijing; Referees: Margeta (SLO), Caputi (ITA)
12 August 2008; 10:50	Report	Score by quarters: 4–0, 2–4, 2–2, 1–2			Ying Tung Natatorium, Beijing; Referees: Margeta (SLO), Caputi (ITA)
12 August 2008; 10:50	Report	X. García 3	Goals	Whalan 2, Woods 2	Ying Tung Natatorium, Beijing; Referees: Margeta (SLO), Caputi (ITA)

14 August 2008; 12:10	Report	Hungary	8–5	Spain	Ying Tung Natatorium, Beijing; Referees: Ciric (SRB), Chaney (USA)
14 August 2008; 12:10	Report	Score by quarters: 2–3, 4–2, 0–0, 2–0			Ying Tung Natatorium, Beijing; Referees: Ciric (SRB), Chaney (USA)
14 August 2008; 12:10	Report	Dé. Varga 2, Benedek 2, Kis 2	Goals	Molina 2	Ying Tung Natatorium, Beijing; Referees: Ciric (SRB), Chaney (USA)

16 August 2008; 14:00	Report	Spain	12–6	Montenegro	Ying Tung Natatorium, Beijing; Referees: Chaney (USA), Tulga (TUR)
16 August 2008; 14:00	Report	Score by quarters: 3–0, 4–1, 3–4, 2–1			Ying Tung Natatorium, Beijing; Referees: Chaney (USA), Tulga (TUR)
16 August 2008; 14:00	Report	Molina 3, F. Perrone 2, X. García 2	Goals	N. Janović 2, Ivović 2	Ying Tung Natatorium, Beijing; Referees: Chaney (USA), Tulga (TUR)

18 August 2008; 15:20	Report	Spain	10–6	Greece	Ying Tung Natatorium, Beijing; Referees: Rak (CRO), Simion (ROU)
18 August 2008; 15:20	Report	Score by quarters: 2–0, 3–0, 3–5, 2–1			Ying Tung Natatorium, Beijing; Referees: Rak (CRO), Simion (ROU)
18 August 2008; 15:20	Report	F. Perrone 7	Goals	Theodoropoulos 2	Ying Tung Natatorium, Beijing; Referees: Rak (CRO), Simion (ROU)

Quarterfinal

20 August 2008; 17:20	Report	Spain	5–9	Serbia	Ying Tung Natatorium, Beijinb; Referees: Turcotte (CAN), Klopper (NED)
20 August 2008; 17:20	Report	Score by quarters: 1–0, 1–5, 1–2, 2–2			Ying Tung Natatorium, Beijinb; Referees: Turcotte (CAN), Klopper (NED)
20 August 2008; 17:20	Report	Molina 2	Goals	Pijetlović 4, Ćirić 2, Vujasinović 2	Ying Tung Natatorium, Beijinb; Referees: Turcotte (CAN), Klopper (NED)

Classification round (5th–6th place)

24 August 2008; 13:00	Report	Croatia	9–11	Spain	Ying Tung Natatorium, Beijing; Referees: Chaney (USA), Kiszelly (HUN)
24 August 2008; 13:00	Report	Score by quarters: 2–0, 3–5, 1–3, 3–3			Ying Tung Natatorium, Beijing; Referees: Chaney (USA), Kiszelly (HUN)
24 August 2008; 13:00	Report	Bušlje 2, Đogaš 2	Goals	X. García 4, Minguell 3, F. Perrone 2	Ying Tung Natatorium, Beijing; Referees: Chaney (USA), Kiszelly (HUN)

== Weightlifting ==
Athlete	Event	Snatch		Clean & Jerk		Total	Rank
Athlete	Event	Result	Rank	Result	Rank	Total	Rank
José Juan Navarro	Men's −94 kg	173	=10	210	=10	383	10
Lydia Valentin	Women's −75 kg	115	5	135	6	250	2nd place, silver medalist(s)

== Wrestling ==
Key:

- VT - Victory by Fall.
- PP - Decision by Points - the loser with technical points.
- PO - Decision by Points - the loser without technical points.

Men's freestyle

Athlete	Event	Qualification	Round of 16	Quarterfinal	Semifinal	Repechage 1	Repechage 2	Final / BM	
Athlete	Event	Opposition Result	Opposition Result	Opposition Result	Opposition Result	Opposition Result	Opposition Result	Opposition Result	Rank
Francisco Sánchez	−55 kg	Bye	Kim H-S (KOR); L 1–3 ^{PP}	Did not advance					13

Women's freestyle

Athlete	Event	Qualification	Round of 16	Quarterfinal	Semifinal	Repechage 1	Repechage 2	Final / BM	
Athlete	Event	Opposition Result	Opposition Result	Opposition Result	Opposition Result	Opposition Result	Opposition Result	Opposition Result	Rank
María Teresa Méndez	−63 kg	Bye	Legrand (FRA); L 0–3 ^{PO}	Did not advance					13
Maider Unda	−72 kg	—N/a	Vashchuk (UKR); W 3–1 ^{PP}	Zlateva (BUL); L 1–3 ^{PP}	Did not advance	Bye	Akuffo (CAN); W 3–1 ^{PP}	Wieszczek (POL); L 1–3 ^{PP}	5

== See also ==
- Spain at the 2008 Summer Paralympics
