= Ana María Pelaz =

Spanish rhythmic gymnast (born 1987)

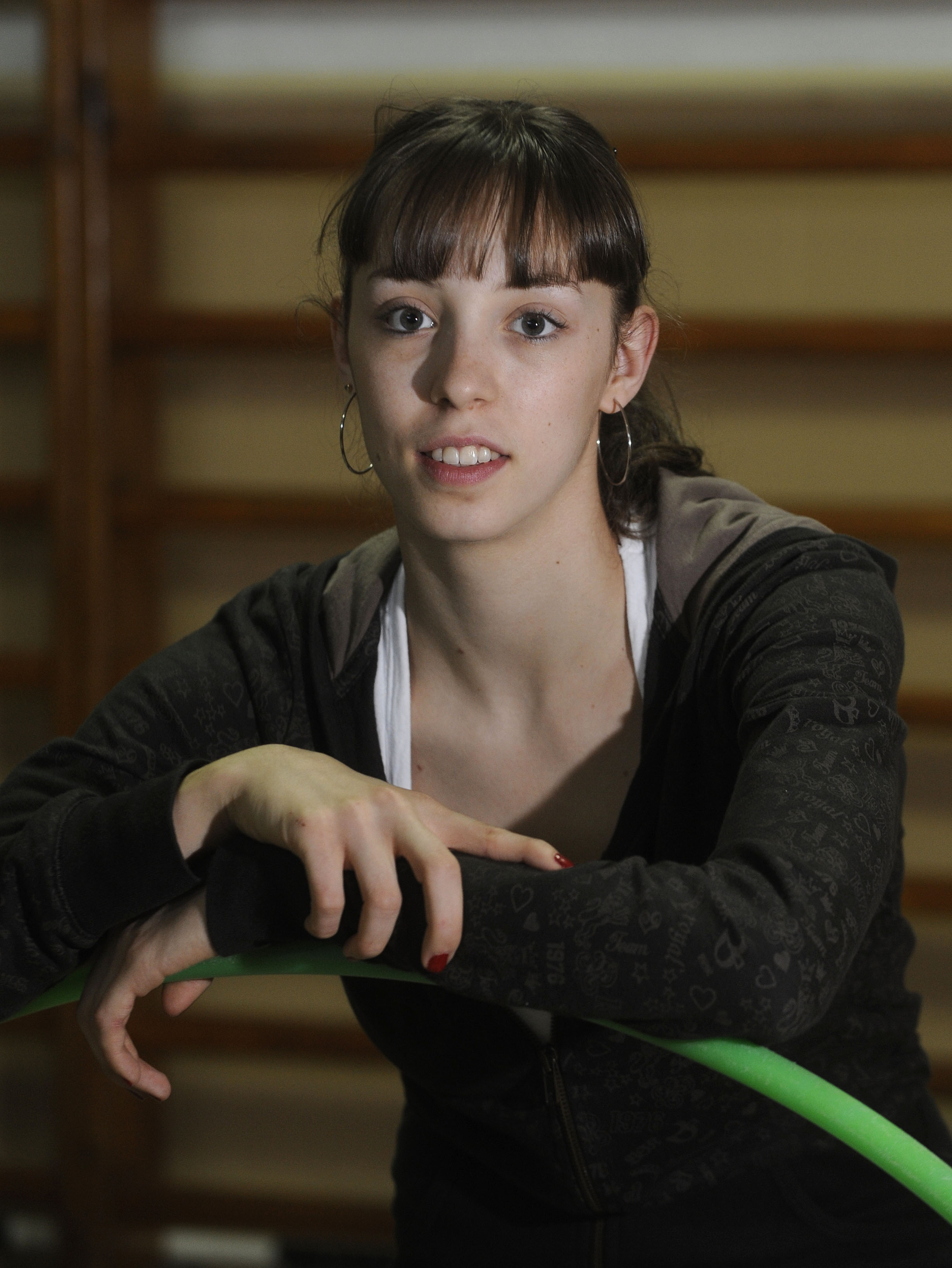

Personal information
- Full name: Ana María Pelaz Mota
- Born: 28 September 1987 (age 38) Laguna de Duero, Spain

Gymnastics career
- Discipline: Rhythmic gymnastics
- Country represented: Spain (2002-2009)
- Club: Club Gimnasia Rítmica Pincias
- Former coach: Silvia Yustos
- Retired: yes
Medal record
Rhythmic Gymnastics
Representing Spain
Event	1st	2nd	3rd
FIG World Cup	0	7	2
Total	0	7	2

Ana María Pelaz Mota (born 24 September 1987), also known as Ana Pelaz, is a former Spanish rhythmic gymnast who competed with the group at the Olympics in Beijing 2008. She won medals in various international competitions. From 2014 to 2020 she was the coach of the national junior group, and since September 2020 she is the coach of the senior group together with Alejandra Quereda at the CAR in Madrid.

== Personal life ==
On 26 July 2019, she married David González.

== Career ==
Pelaz started in rhythmic gymnastics at the age of 6, joining the Pincias Rhythmic Gymnastics Club of Valladolid, a club founded by former national gymnast Silvia Yustos, who was also her coach. She left the club in 2002 after being requested by the national team.

In 2002 she was invited to be part of the national rhythmic gymnastics team of Spain in the group modality. Since then, she has trained an average of 8 hours a day at the Madrid High Performance Center under the orders first of Rosa Menor and Noelia Fernández, since 2004 of Anna Baranova and Sara Bayón and since October 2008 of Efrossina Angelova. At first she was part of the substitute gymnasts and she did not attend competitions, until in 2005 she entered the starting group. Pelaz would not be called up to the 2004 Athens Olympics, although both she and Lara González, who was also left out of the Games, traveled to Athens and cheered on their teammates from the stands.

By 2005 with the new national coach, Anna Baranova, the team took 7th place in the all-around and 6th in 3 hoops and 4 clubs at the World Championships in Baku, The group was formed that year by Ana María, Bárbara González, Lara González, Marta Linares, Isabel Pagán and Nuria Velasco.

At the beginning of March 2006, the Spanish team obtained 3 silver medals at the Madeira International Tournament. In September, at the World Cup event held in Portimão, the team achieved bronze in 5 ribbons and silver in 3 hoops and 4 clubs, in addition to the 5th place in the All-Around. That same month, at the European Championships in Moscow, she placed 5th in the All-Around and 5th place in the 5-ribbon final. In November, the Spanish team participated in the World Cup Final in Mie, where they obtained 5th place in 5 ribbons and 8th in 3 hoops and 4 clubs. The group was practically the same as the previous year but with Violeta González replacing Marta Linares.

In April 2007, in the World Cup held in Portimão, the group achieved 5th place in the general competition and 6th in both the 5 ropes final and the 3 hoops and 4 clubs final. In May, she obtained the silver medal both in the All-Around and in the final of 3 hoops and 4 clubs of the World Cup event held in Nizhni Novgorod, in addition to 4th place in 5 ropes. In September of that same year, the World Championship in Patras the group obtained 5th place in the All-Around, which gave them qualification for the 2008 Beijing Olympic Games. They also achieved 6th place in both 5 ropes and 3 hoops and 4 clubs. In December they competed in the Beijing Pre-Olympic, obtaining 8th place in the All-Around. The starting group would be made up that year by Ana María, Bárbara González, Lara González, Isabel Pagán, Verónica Ruiz and Bet Salom.

For this time, in addition to the starters, in the preparatory concentration of the Games there were other gymnasts then substitutes such as Sandra Aguilar, Cristina Dassaeva, Sara Garvín, Violeta González or Lidia Redondo. In January 2008, Ana María received the Junco Gold to the best athlete from Laguna de Duero. In June 2008 the Turin European Championship took place, where the group achieved 6th place in the All-Around and 4th place both in 5 ropes and in 3 hoops and 4 clubs. In August of that year she participated in the 2008 Beijing Olympic Games, it would be her first and only Olympics. The team could only get the 11th position in the qualifying phase, after making several mistakes in the second exercise, the one with 3 hoops and 4 clubs, this meant that the team could not get into the Olympic final. In October of that same year, they would achieve two silver medals in the World Cup Final held in Benidorm, both in the 5 ropes competition and in the 3 hoops and 4 clubs. The group was made up of the same gymnasts who went to Beijing: Ana María, Bárbara González, Lara González, Isabel Pagán, Verónica Ruiz and Bet Salom. That same month of October, the new coach, the Bulgarian Efrossina Angelova, took charge of the team together with Sara Bayón (who after leaving the team in May 2009 would be replaced by Noelia Fernández).

For 2009, Ana María became the captain of an almost completely renewed ensemble, being the only one of the gymnasts who had been in Beijing 2008 to remain in it. Some gymnasts such as Bet Salom decided to leave the selection due to Angelova's decision to increase the number of hours of training, which made them incompatible with their studies. In April 2009, the group led by Pelaz won two silver medals (in the All-Around and in 3 ribbons and 2 ropes) in the World Cup held in Portimão, Portugal, as well as 6th place in 5 hoops. In September, at the Mie World Championships, the team placed 6th in both the All-Around and 5 hoops final, and 7th in 3 ribbon and 2 ropes. The starting team that year was formed by Ana María, Loreto Achaerandio, Sandra Aguilar, Alejandra Quereda and Lidia Redondo, in addition to Nuria Artigues and Sara Garvín as substitutes at the beginning and end of the season respectively.

=== Retirement ===
At the age of 22, in October 2009, she retired from rhythmic gymnastics of her own free will after carrying an ankle injury all year.

In 2014 he began training, together with Anna Baranova and Sara Bayón, the national junior team, whose members joined the permanent concentration of the CAR in Madrid on 1 September 2014. Directed by Pelaz, the junior team achieved in 2015 the 4th position in the All-Around and 7th in the 5 ball final at the Miss Valentine International Tournament in Tartu, 4th in the All-Around and bronze in the 5 ball final at the Lisbon International Tournament, and All-Around 9th position in the European Championship in Minsk. On 23 July 2016, Pelaz was invited to the 20th Anniversary Gala of the gold medal in Atlanta '96, held in Badajoz, where the junior Spanish team trained by her made two exhibitions.

Since September 2020, she has been the coach of the senior Spanish team together with the coach Alejandra Quereda at the CAR in Madrid.
