= Violeta González =

Spanish rhythmic gymnast and actress

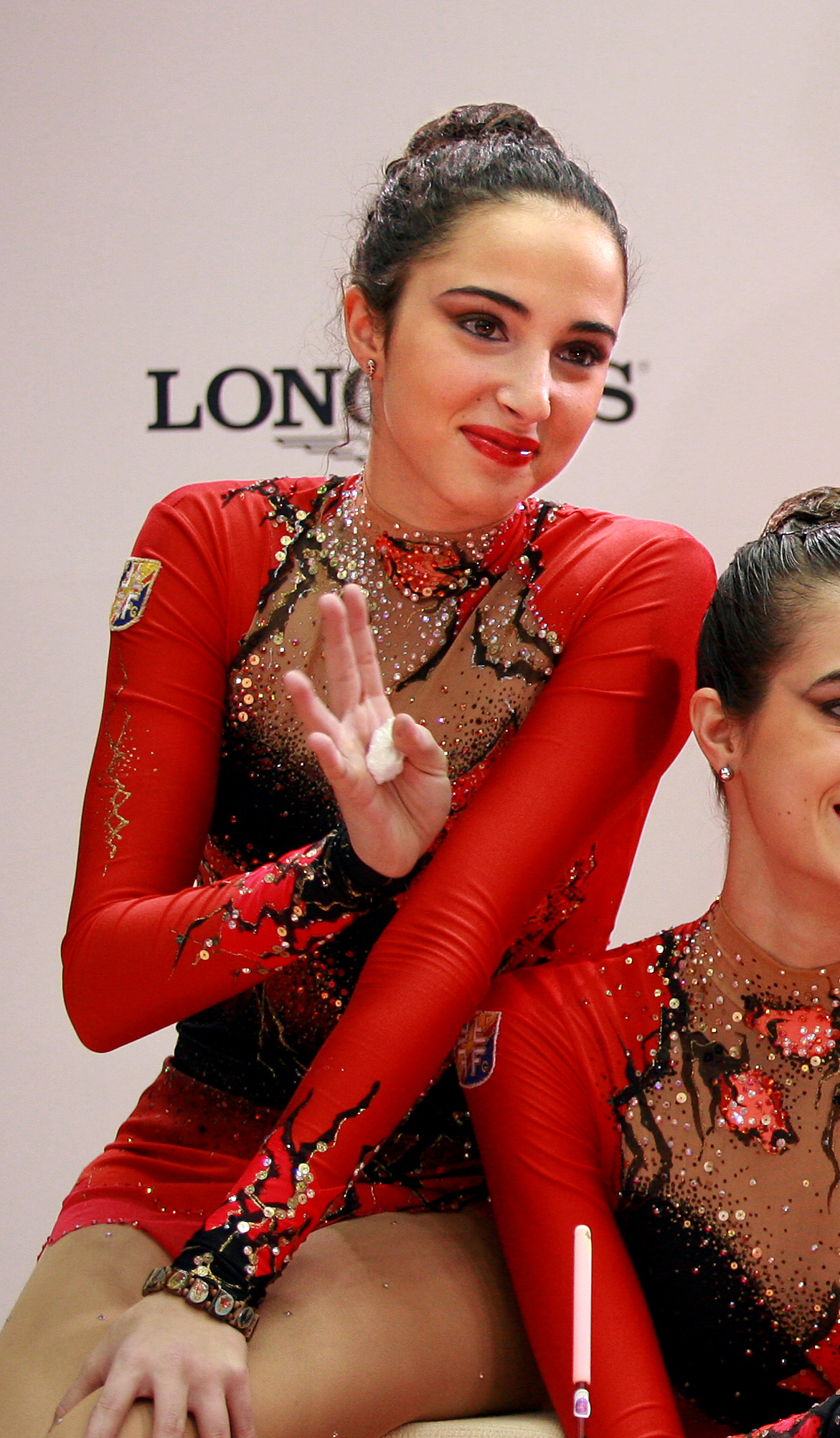
- González in 2006

Personal information
- Full name: Violeta González Ríos
- Born: 4 May 1989 (age 37) Málaga, Spain

Gymnastics career
- Discipline: Rhythmic gymnastics
- Country represented: Spain; (2002–2008)
- Club: Club Guadalmedina / Club Gimnasia Rítmica Marbella
- Head coach: Anna Baranova
- Assistant coach: Sara Bayón
Medal record
Rhythmic Gymnastics
Representing Spain
Event	1st	2nd	3rd
FIG World Cup	0	1	1
Total	0	1	1

Violeta González Ríos (born 4 May 1989) is a Spanish retired rhythmic gymnast and actress. She represented her country in international competitions.

== Biography ==
Violeta took up rhythmic gymnastics at Club Guadalmedina in Málaga. With this club she won bronze for both teams and hands-free in the children category at the Spanish Championships held in Zaragoza in May 1999. Later she moved to the Marbella Rhythmic Gymnastics Club of the homonymous city, where she was trained by María Eugenia Díaz Mateos, becoming also part of the Andalusian team. With the Club Marbella she won the gold medal in children's category in the Spanish Groups Championships in 2000, and the 2nd and 3rd place in Andalusian Championships.

In 2002, she was called up along Verónica Ruiz to compete at Cerceu D'Or tournament in Bulgaria. That same year she was asked to join the national junior group and in 2003 she participated as a member of the same in the European Championships of Riesa, where the Spanish group was 7th with the exercise of 5 hoops. The group was composed of Violeta, Laura García Repo, Cristina Dassaeva, Esther Rodríguez Rojo, Verónica Ruiz and Paula de Juan Corral as an alternate. In 2004, as a junior individual, she took silver with ball and bronze with hoop at the Gymnasiade.

At the end of 2004 she joined the national senior group coached by Anna Baranova and Sara Bayón, training 8 hours a day at the CAR in Madrid. In 2005 she was selected by the Plan Andalucia Olimpica. In 2006 she received the ADO scholarship and became one of the titular gymnast in the exercise of 3 hoops and 4 clubs, while in the 5 ribbons Bárbara González Oteiza was in her place instead.

In early March 2006, the Spanish group won 3 silver medals at the Madeira International Tournament. In September, at the World Cup event held in Portimão, the team won bronze with 5 ribbons and silver with 3 hoops and 4 clubs, in addition to the 5th place in the All-Around. That same month, at the European Championships in Moscow the group took 5th place overall and with 5 ribbons. In November they participated in the World Cup Final in Mie, where they finished in 5th place with 5 ribbons and 8th with 3 hoops & 4 clubs. This year the group was made up of Violeta, Bárbara González Oteiza, Lara González, Isabel Pagán, Ana María Pelaz and Nuria Velasco.

In 2007, she received the ADO scholarship and from that year until 2008 she became a substitute gymnast for the group, remaining in the preparatory trainings for the 2008 Olympics along with other reserves such as Sandra Aguilar, Cristina Dassaeva, Sara Garvín or Lidia Redondo.

Violeta retired in June 2008. After her retirement she studied drama at the Cristina Rota School of Interpretation in Madrid, performing for two years in the play La katarsis del tomatazo in the Sala Mirador in Madrid. She also studied at the School of Communication, Image and Sound (CEV). As a member of the production company 7 and Action, from 2010 to 2011 he was part of the production team of the television program Tonterías las justas by the TV channel Cuatro, making the reservations of the public and participating in the organization, in addition to appearing recurrently as a substitute. Violeta has since worked several times as an actress, having participated for example in two television spots with Miki Nadal for the advertising campaign «Size does matter» by LG in 2014, or in plays such as El filantropófago in 2016 at the Teatro Cervantes in Malaga and at Microteatro Málaga, among other audiovisual productions.
