= Cristina Dassaeva =

Spanish rhythmic gymnast and cheerleader

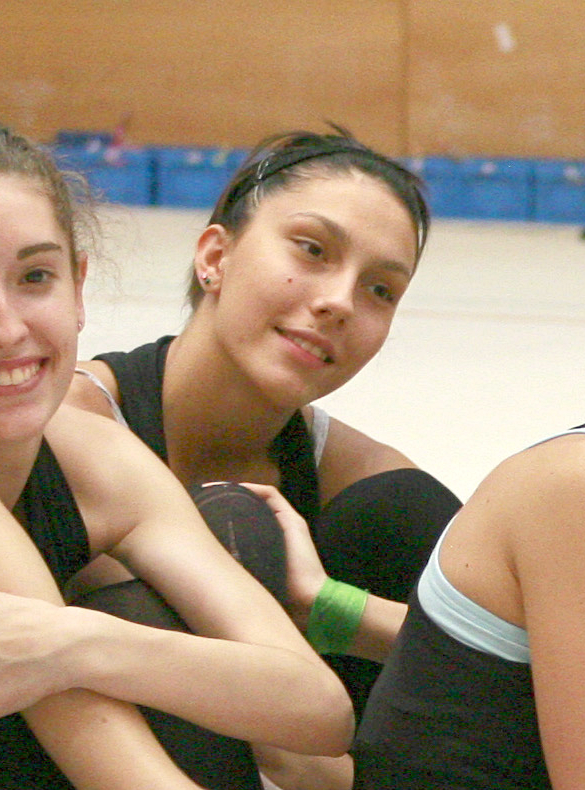
- Full name: Cristina Dassaeva Gaas
- Born: 2 April 1990 (age 36) Seville, Spain

Gymnastics career
- Discipline: Aerobic gymnastics
- Country represented: Spain (2002-2008)
- Club: Club Deportivo Zaragozano de Gimnasia / Gym Zaragoza
- Retired: yes

Cristina Dassaeva Gaas (born 2 April 1990) is a Spanish retired rhythmic gymnast of Russian descent. She was a member of the national group.

== Personal life ==
Cristina is the daughter of Soviet football player Rinat Dasayev, her mother was a rhythmic gymnast. Her younger sister Elmira competed in rhythmic and aerobic gymnastics.

== Career ==
Born in Sevilla while her father played for Sevilla FC, she began practising rhythmic gymnastics at the Club Deportivo Zaragozano de Gimnasia with her sister Elmira. Along with other gymnasts such as Ada Liberio, Ana Bolea or her sister, she made the club become one of the leading teams in rhythmic gymnastics at the regional level for several decades.

In both 2000 and 2001 she was the Aragon individual children individual champion. In the Individual Spanish Championships she won the bronze medal in the children category in 2000. In the 2001 group championships she won silver in the children's category, and in 2002, in Murcia, she was proclaimed junior champion of Spain in groups with the Sports Club Zaragozano both in the All-Around and with 3 hoops and 2 balls.

In 2002 she was called up to join the national junior group and in 2003 she participated as a member of the same in the European Championships of Riesa, where the Spanish group was 7th with the exercise of 5 hoops. The group was composed of Cristina, Laura García Repo, Violeta González, Esther Rodríguez Rojo, Verónica Ruiz and Paula de Juan Corral as an alternate. From 8 October 2005 to 2008 she was a substitute for the national senior group at the CAR in Madrid, which was preparing for the 2008 Summer Olympics under coaches Anna Baranova and Sara Bayón. With the same she participated in several exhibitions, also competing in the 2008 Andalusian Cup, held under the Marbella Grand Prix and where the group won gold with 5 ropes. In 2008, in addition to Cristina, the group was composed by Bárbara González Oteiza, Lara González, Isabel Pagán, Ana María Pelaz, Verónica Ruiz and Bet Salom, and the alternates Sandra Aguilar, Sara Garvín, Violeta González and Lidia Redondo.

Dassaeva retired as a gymnast at the end of 2008. She then had been a coach in Zaragoza. From December 2014 to October 2016 she was a member of the group Gym Zaragoza aesthetic gymnastics team, with which she participated in several tournaments and championships achieving several medals. On 3 October 2016, she announced through Instagram her definitive retirement from gymnastics.

Dassaeva is part of the official cheerleaders team of Basket Zaragoza, having also been cheerleader in the "Gira Ruta Ñ" of 2015 of the Spanish basketball team and in the 2016 U-17 World Championship in Zaragoza. She also works as a model for various brands.
