= Blanca Castroviejo =

Spanish rhythmic gymnast

- Full name: Blanca Castroviejo Fisher
- Born: 11 February 1985 (age 41) Seville, Spain

Gymnastics career
- Discipline: Rhythmic gymnastics
- Country represented: Spain (2000-2003)
- Club: Club Gimnasia Ritmica Marbella
- Head coach: Rosa Menor
- Assistant coach: Noelia Fernández
- Retired: yes

Blanca Castroviejo Fisher (born 11 February 1985) is a retired Spanish rhythmic gymnast. She was a member of the national senior group from 2001 to 2003.

== Biography ==
Blanca took up rhythmic gymnastics when he was 7 years old, as an extracurricular activity at her school, Claret de Seville. At the age of 10, the coach of the Marbella Rhythmic Gymnastics Club selected her to be part of the Plan for Technique and Detection of New Talents and she joined the gymnasts of the Specialized Center for Sports Technique of Rhythmic Gymnastics (CETD) of Marbella. Being part of the club, she won various medal at Spanish championships in various categories.

In 2000, at the age of 15, she was called up to be part of the Spanish national team as part of the group. Since then she trained an average of 8 hours a day at the Madrid High Performance Center under the orders first of Nancy Usero, from March 2001 of Nina Vitrichenko, and since October 2001 of Rosa Menor. In 2001, at the S.M. Trophy Margarita in Bulgaria, the group won 3 silver medals, in the All-Around and in the apparatus finals. Later, she would compete as a substitute gymnast in the 10 clubs exercise and as a starter in the 3 ropes and 2 balls one at the European Championships in Geneva, where the group was 7th in the All-Around and with 10 clubs, 8th with 3 ropes and 2 balls. That year the group was made up of Blanca, Sonia Abejón, Belén Aguado, Bárbara González Oteiza, Marta Linares and Aida Otero. That same year she entered the Olympic Andalusia Plan for the 2004 Athens Olympic Games.

The following year, in 2002, he was a starter in both exercises, 5 ribbons one and the 3 ropes and 2 balls, at the World Championships in New Orleans, where the Blanca, along Sonia Abejón, Belén Aguado, Bárbara González Oteiza, Marta Linares and Isabel Pagán, finished 9th in the All-Around and 7th in the 5 ribbons' final.

In February 2003, the group won the 3 golds at the Madeira International Tournament. During the Sant Petersburg Pearls Trophy they won 3 bronzes. Later, in the Torrevieja International Triangular she won silver in the All-Around. Her last competition as a member of the national team was the 2003 European Rhythmic Gymnastics Championships, held in April in the German city of Riesa, competing along Sonia Abejón, Bárbara González Oteiza, Lara González, Isabel Pagán and Nuria Velasco, she finished 6th in the All-Around, 7th with 3 hoops & 2 balls and 8th with 5 ribbons. In May of that year she left the team voluntarily due to a serious foot injury and differences with the coaching staff. The national team coordinator, Ludmila Dimitrova, convinced her to join as an individual gymnast, remaining in the individual team for three weeks, however, at the end of June 2003 she officially announced her retirement from competition, returning to Seville.

Later she studied administration and finance.
