= Sonia Abejón =

Spanish gymnast

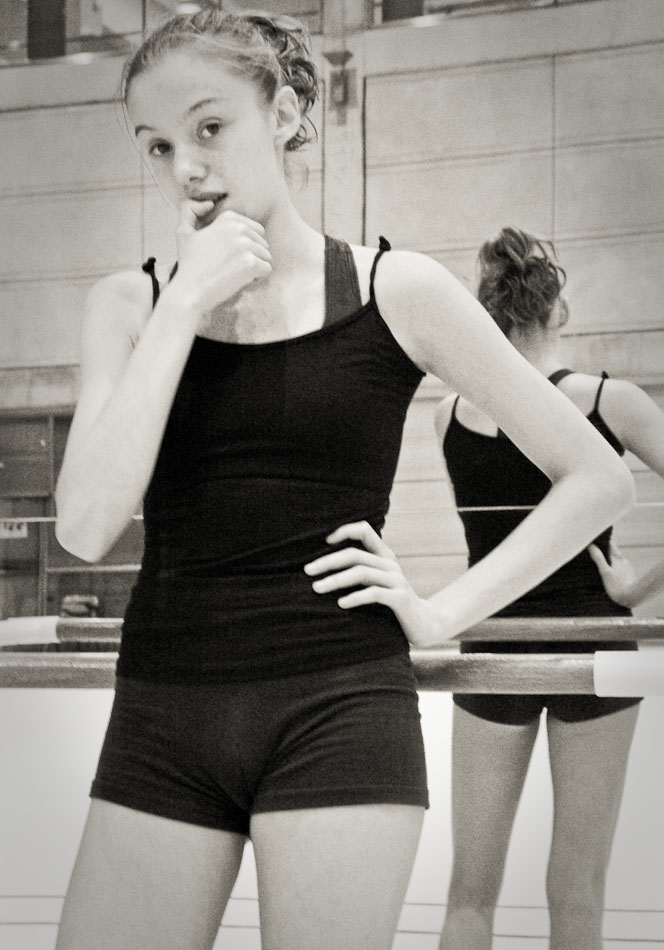

Personal information
- Full name: Sonia Abejón Esteban
- Nationality: Spanish
- Born: 1 August 1985 (age 40) Madrid, Spain
- Height: 1.69 m (5 ft 7 in)
- Weight: 48 kg (106 lb)

Sport
- Sport: Gymnastics

Sonia Abejón Esteban (born 1 August 1985) is a Spanish gymnast. She competed in the 2004 Summer Olympics. She currently trains the San Fernando de Henares Rhythmic Gymnastics Club in the city of the same name.

== Career ==
=== Junior ===
She started in Rhythmic Gymnastics at the age of 5 at the Torrejón School of Rhythmic Gymnastics in Torrejón de Ardoz (Madrid). At the age of 13 she went to the C.G.R.D. San Fernando of San Fernando de Henares. She won a silver medal in rope and bronze in freehand and clubs in the 1997 Spanish Championship of Clubs and Autonomous Communities in Barcelona, and bronze in ribbon in the junior category in the 1999 Spanish Championship of Clubs and Autonomous Communities in Zaragoza.

=== Senior ===
In January 2001 she was selected to be part of the Spanish national rhythmic gymnastics group. Since then, she trained an average of 8 hours a day at the High Performance Center in Madrid under the orders first of Nina Vitrichenko then, since October 2001 of Rosa Menor and Noelia Fernández, and since 2004 of Anna Baranova and Sara Bayón. In the Trophy S.M. Margarita in Bulgaria, the group obtained 3 silver medals, both in the general competition and in the finals of 10 clubs and 3 ropes and 2 balls. Later, Abejón participated in her first official competition, the European Championship in Geneva. The ensemble obtained 7th place in the All-Around and in 10 clubs, and 8th in 3 ribbons and 2 balls. The group was made up that year by Abejón, Belén Aguado, Blanca Castroviejo, Bárbara González Oteiza, Marta Linares and Aida Otero. In July 2002, she competed at the World Championship in New Orleans, where the team finished 9th in the All-Around and 7th in the 5 ribbon final. The group for the competitions was made up that year by Abejón, Aguado, Castroviejo, Bárbara González Oteiza, Linares and Isabel Pagán.

By February 2003, the team won three gold medals played in the Madeira International Tournament. In the Saint Petersburg's Pearls Trophy they achieved 3 bronzes. Later, in the Torrevieja Triangular Tournament, they obtained All-Around silver. In April 2003, the Spanish team competed in the Riesa European Championship, where they placed 6th in the All-Around, 7th in 3 hoops and 2 balls, and 8th in 5 ribbons. In September, they performed the World Championship in Budapest, once again achieving All-Around's 6th place, and thus obtaining the pass to the 2004 Athens Olympic Games. There they also ended 7th place in 3 hoops and 2 balls, and 6th in 5 ribbons. The group was made up at the beginning of the year by Abejón, Castroviejo, González Oteiza, Lara González, Pagán and Nuria Velasco, although Castroviejo retired in May, and Linares returned to the role.

In February 2004, at the Madeira International Tournament, the group won 3 silver medals. In the Pre-Olympic Games in Athens, held in March, they placed 6th in the All-Around. In April 2004, the group participated the Volga Magical International Tournament in Nizhni Novgorod, a Rhythmic Gymnastics World Cup event, where they placed 4th in the general competition, 5th in 3 hoops and 2 balls, and 4th in 5 ribbons. In May, at the World Cup event in Duisburg, they placed 4th in both the All-Around and apparatus finals, as well as the All-Around at the Varna event in July. In August, the Olympic Games in Athens took place, Abejón's only Olympic participation. The Spanish team obtained the pass to the final after achieving 8th place in qualification. Finally, on August 28, they ended in 7th in the final, for which she got the Olympic diploma. The group for the Games was made up of Abejón, González Oteiza, Linares, Pagán, Carolina Rodríguez and Nuria Velasco. Although they were part, as substitutes, of the national team that year, Lara González and Ana María Pelaz were also part of the national team, they were left out of the call for the Games, so their role was limited to encouraging their teammates from the stands of the Athenian pavilion.

=== Retirement ===
After the Olympic Games in Athens, Abejón retired from gymnastics. From 2006 to 2010 she returned to competition as a member of the District III Club of Alcalá de Henares. In the 2006 Spanish Group Championship in Vecindario, she achieved bronze in the youth category, thus obtaining the club to the first category. The following year, at the 2007 Spanish Group Championship in Granada, she achieved 8th place in the first category, and at the 2008 Spanish Group Championship in Zaragoza she also won bronze in the first category. In 2009 she participated in the Spanish Group Championship held in Valladolid and in 2010 in Logroño.

After leaving the national team, she has worked, among other professions, as a security guard, stewardess, administrative and rhythmic gymnastics coach, having the Level III of National Coaches. She also practiced Aesthetic Gymnastics for a time together with other former national gymnasts such as Nuria Artigues, Rebeca García, Sara Garvín, Bárbara González Oteiza, Lara González, Marta Linares, Isabel Pagán and Bet Salom.

Currently and since 2009, she coaches and is the technical director of the San Fernando de Henares Rhythmic Gymnastics Club in the city of the same name, a club established in 1994 and in which she trained as a gymnast in the years prior to joining the national team. Her former teammate Marta Linares also coaches at this club. The M4 Sports Center in Torrejón de Ardoz has been named after her since March 23, 2015.
