= Carlos Prieto =

Carlos Prieto may refer to:

- Carlos Prieto (cellist) (born 1937), Mexican cellist and writer
- Carlos Prieto (handballer) (born 1980), Spanish Olympic handball player
- Carlos Miguel Prieto, Mexican conductor and violinist
