= Marta Linares (gymnast) =

Spanish rhythmic gymnast

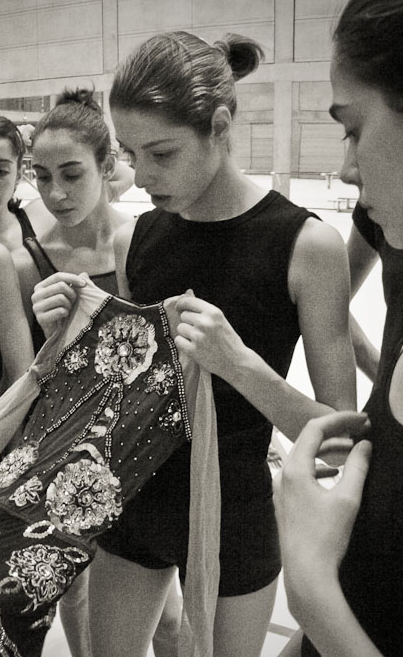

Personal information
- Full name: Marta Linares García
- Born: 31 January 1986 (age 40) Castellón de la Plana, Spain
- Height: 5 ft 7.5 in (171 cm)

Gymnastics career
- Discipline: Rhythmic gymnastics
- Country represented: Spain (2001 — 2006)
- Club: Club Deportivo Lledó

Marta Linares García (born 31 January 1986 in Castellón de la Plana) is a Spanish group rhythmic gymnast representing her nation at international competitions. She is the current coach of the Spanish Individual National Team in Madrid.

She participated at the 2004 Summer Olympics, in the group all-around event, together with Sonia Abejón, Bárbara González, Isabel Pagán, Carolina Rodríguez and Nuria Velasco finishing 7th in the final after finishing 8th in the qualification. She competed at world championships, including at the 2005 World Rhythmic Gymnastics Championships.
