= Jiří Jedlička =

Czech swimmer

Personal information
- Full name: Jiří Jedlička
- National team: Czech Republic
- Born: 5 February 1987 (age 39) Pardubice, Czechoslovakia
- Height: 1.87 m (6 ft 2 in)
- Weight: 81 kg (179 lb)

Sport
- Sport: Swimming
- Strokes: Breaststroke
- Club: SC Plavecky Areal Pardubice
- Coach: Jaroslav Strnad

Jiří Jedlička (born 5 February 1987) is a Czech former swimmer, who specialized in breaststroke events. He represented his nation Czech Republic at the 2008 Summer Olympics, and has owned multiple Czech championship titles and national records in both the 100 and 200 m breaststroke. Jedlicka was also a member of Plavecky Areal Swimming Club in Pardubice, under the tutelage of his personal coach Jaroslav Strnad.

Jedlicka competed for the Czech Republic in a breaststroke double at the 2008 Summer Olympics in Beijing. He posted a sterling 1:01.46 to hack 0.04 seconds off the Czech record, set by Daniel Malek (1:01.50) in 2000, and sneak under the FINA A-cut (1:01.57) by about a tenth of a second for the seventh seed headed into the 100 m breaststroke final at the European Championships three months earlier in Eindhoven, Netherlands. In his first event, 100 m breaststroke, Jedlicka held off the hard-charging Spaniards Melquíades Álvarez and Borja Iradier to hit the wall in heat six with a fifth-place time and twenty-ninth overall in 1:01.56. Three days later, in the 200 m breaststroke, Jedlicka swam well through the 150-metre lap in heat three, but faded the closing stretch that allowed his Spanish rival Álvarez to pass him by 3.2 seconds, touching the fourth spot and thirty-ninth overall in 2:15.79.
