= Swimming at the 2008 Summer Olympics – Men's 100 metre breaststroke =

Men's 100 metre breaststroke at the Games of the XXIX Olympiad
- Venue: Beijing National Aquatics Center
- Date: August 9, 2008 (heats); August 10, 2008 (semifinals); August 11, 2008 (final)
- Competitors: 65 from 54 nations
- Winning time: 58.91 WR

Medalists
1st place, gold medalist(s)		Kosuke Kitajima	Japan
2nd place, silver medalist(s)		Alexander Dale Oen	Norway
3rd place, bronze medalist(s)		Hugues Duboscq	France

The men's 100 metre breaststroke event at the 2008 Summer Olympics took place on 9–11 August at the Beijing National Aquatics Center in Beijing, China.

Japan's Kosuke Kitajima set a new world record of 58.91 to defend his Olympic title in the event. Alexander Dale Oen powered home with a silver in 59.20, earning a first Olympic medal for Norway in swimming. Coming from seventh place in the final turn, France's Hugues Duboscq managed to repeat a bronze from Athens four years earlier, in a time of 59.37. U.S. swimmer and defending silver medalist Brendan Hansen pulled off a fourth-place effort in 59.57, two-tenths of a second (0.20) behind Duboscq.

Australia's Brenton Rickard finished fifth with a time of 59.74, and was followed in sixth spot by Russia's Roman Sloudnov, bronze medalist in Sydney (2000), in a national record of 59.87. Ukraine's Igor Borysik (1:00.20) and American Mark Gangloff (1:00.24) rounded out the finale.

Earlier, Dale Oen set a new Olympic record of 59.41 in the prelims, and eventually lowered it to 59.16 in the semifinals by the next morning's session.

== Controversy ==
Iran's Mohammad Alirezaei was due to race against Israel's Tom Be'eri in the fourth heat of the 100 metre breaststroke, but pulled out, apparently under the orders from officials of the Iranian delegation. Efraim Zinger, Olympic Committee of Israel General Secretary, criticized the withdrawal saying "Politics takes precedence over sport with the Iranians and the Olympic spirit is as far from them as east is far from west". Giselle Davies, director of communications for the IOC, said that Alirezaei withdrew because of sickness and submitted his case in writing to his Federation. At the 2004 Games in Athens, Iran's Arash Miresmaeili, a two-time world judo champion, refused to compete against Israel's Ehud Vaks in the opening round of the 66 kg competition, later admitting that he made his decision to show solidarity for the Palestinian cause.

== Records ==
Prior to this competition, the existing world and Olympic records were as follows.

World record	Brendan Hansen (USA)	59.13	Irvine, United States	1 August 2006	
Olympic record	Brendan Hansen (USA)	1:00.01	Athens, Greece	14 August 2004	-

The following new world and Olympic records were set during this competition.

Date	Event	Name	Nationality	Time	Record
August 9	Heat 7	Alexander Dale Oen	Norway	59.41	OR
August 10	Semifinal 2	Alexander Dale Oen	Norway	59.16	OR
August 11	Final	Kosuke Kitajima	Japan	58.91	WR

== Results ==
=== Heats ===
Rank	Heat	Lane	Name	Nationality	Time	Notes
1	7	4	Alexander Dale Oen	Norway	59.41	Q, OR
2	8	4	Kosuke Kitajima	Japan	59.52	Q
3	9	5	Hugues Duboscq	France	59.67	Q
4	7	5	Brenton Rickard	Australia	59.89	Q, OC
5	7	7	Cameron van der Burgh	South Africa	59.96	Q, AF
6	9	7	Giedrius Titenis	Lithuania	1:00.11	Q
7	9	3	Roman Sloudnov	Russia	1:00.20	Q
8	8	2	Igor Borysik	Ukraine	1:00.31	Q
9	6	3	Damir Dugonjič	Slovenia	1:00.35	Q
10	7	3	Christian Sprenger	Australia	1:00.36	Q
11	9	4	Brendan Hansen	United States	1:00.65	Q
12	7	6	Oleg Lisogor	Ukraine	1:00.65	Q
13	9	2	Yuta Suenaga	Japan	1:00.67	Q
14	8	7	Mihail Alexandrov	Bulgaria	1:00.69	Q
15	8	5	Chris Cook	Great Britain	1:00.70	Q
16	8	3	Mark Gangloff	United States	1:00.71	Q
17	6	5	Vladislav Polyakov	Kazakhstan	1:00.80	
18	4	4	Hunor Mate	Austria	1:00.93	NR
19	8	8	Richárd Bodor	Hungary	1:00.97	
20	5	5	Mike Brown	Canada	1:00.98	
20	8	6	Glenn Snyders	New Zealand	1:00.98	
22	7	1	Felipe França Silva	Brazil	1:01.04	
23	7	2	Henrique Barbosa	Brazil	1:01.11	
24	6	7	Matjaž Markič	Slovenia	1:01.31	
24	7	8	Dániel Gyurta	Hungary	1:01.31	
26	9	8	Thijs van Valkengoed	Netherlands	1:01.32	
27	9	1	Kristopher Gilchrist	Great Britain	1:01.34	
28	6	1	Mathieu Bois	Canada	1:01.45	
29	6	6	Jiří Jedlička	Czech Republic	1:01.56	
30	5	2	Andrew Bree	Ireland	1:01.76	
31	5	1	Valentin Preda	Romania	1:01.77	
31	5	3	Jonas Andersson	Sweden	1:01.77	
33	3	1	Daniel Velez	Puerto Rico	1:01.80	NR
34	8	1	Dmitry Komornikov	Russia	1:01.82	
35	5	4	Yevgeniy Ryzhkov	Kazakhstan	1:01.83	
35	6	4	Borja Iradier	Spain	1:01.83	
37	6	2	Melquíades Álvarez	Spain	1:01.89	
38	3	2	Sandeep Sejwal	India	1:02.19	
39	4	5	Demir Atasoy	Turkey	1:02.25	
40	4	2	Čaba Silađi	Serbia	1:02.31	
41	3	3	Genaro Prono	Paraguay	1:02.32	
42	4	7	Tom Be'eri	Israel	1:02.42	NR
42	5	6	Vanja Rogulj	Croatia	1:02.42	
44	5	7	Sofiane Daid	Algeria	1:02.45	
45	4	6	Martti Aljand	Estonia	1:02.46	NR
46	4	8	Xue Ruipeng	China	1:02.48	
47	4	3	Jakob Jóhann Sveinsson	Iceland	1:02.50	
48	3	6	Malick Fall	Senegal	1:02.51	
49	5	8	Viktar Vabishchevich	Belarus	1:03.29	
50	9	6	Romanos Alyfantis	Greece	1:03.39	
51	3	5	Alwin de Prins	Luxembourg	1:03.64	
52	3	4	Sergio Andres Ferreyra	Argentina	1:03.65	
53	2	3	Édgar Crespo	Panama	1:03.72	
54	2	4	Sergiu Postica	Moldova	1:03.83	
55	3	8	Andrei Cross	Barbados	1:04.57	
56	3	7	Ivan Demyanenko	Uzbekistan	1:05.14	
57	2	6	Wael Koubrousli	Lebanon	1:06.22	
58	2	5	Nguyen Huu Viet	Vietnam	1:06.36	
59	2	2	Erik Rajohnson	Madagascar	1:08.42	
60	2	7	Boldbaataryn Bütekh-Uils	Mongolia	1:10.80	
61	1	4	Osama Mohammed Ye Alarag	Qatar	1:10.83	
62	1	5	Mohammed Al-Habsi	Oman	1:12.28	
63	1	3	Petero Okotai	Cook Islands	1:20.20	
	6	8	Alessandro Terrin	Italy	DSQ	
	4	1	Mohammad Alirezaei	Iran	DNS	

=== Semifinals ===
==== Semifinal 1 ====
Rank	Lane	Name	Nationality	Time	Notes
1	4	Kosuke Kitajima	Japan	59.55	Q
2	5	Brenton Rickard	Australia	59.65	Q, OC
3	8	Mark Gangloff	United States	1:00.44	Q
4	6	Igor Borysik	Ukraine	1:00.55	Q
5	7	Oleg Lisogor	Ukraine	1:00.56	
6	1	Mihail Alexandrov	Bulgaria	1:00.61	NR
7	3	Giedrius Titenis	Lithuania	1:00.66	
8	2	Christian Sprenger	Australia	1:00.76	

==== Semifinal 2 ====
Rank	Lane	Name	Nationality	Time	Notes
1	4	Alexander Dale Oen	Norway	59.16	Q, OR
2	5	Hugues Duboscq	France	59.83	Q
3	7	Brendan Hansen	United States	59.94	Q
4	6	Roman Sloudnov	Russia	1:00.10	Q
5	3	Cameron van der Burgh	South Africa	1:00.57	
6	1	Yuta Suenaga	Japan	1:00.67	
7	8	Chris Cook	Great Britain	1:00.81	
8	2	Damir Dugonjič	Slovenia	1:00.92	

=== Final ===
Rank	Lane	Name	Nationality	Time	Notes
1st place, gold medalist(s)	5	Kosuke Kitajima	Japan	58.91	WR
2nd place, silver medalist(s)	4	Alexander Dale Oen	Norway	59.20	
3rd place, bronze medalist(s)	6	Hugues Duboscq	France	59.37	
4	2	Brendan Hansen	United States	59.57	
5	3	Brenton Rickard	Australia	59.74	
6	7	Roman Sloudnov	Russia	59.87	NR
7	8	Igor Borysik	Ukraine	1:00.20	
8	1	Mark Gangloff	United States	1:00.24	
