= Yuta Suenaga =

Japanese swimmer (born 1985)

Personal information
- Full name: Yuta Suenaga
- National team: Japan
- Born: 7 April 1985 (age 41) Kanagawa Prefecture, Japan
- Height: 1.78 m (5 ft 10 in)
- Weight: 72 kg (159 lb)

Sport
- Sport: Swimming
- Strokes: Breaststroke
- Club: Team Arena
- Coach: Toshiaki Kurosawa

Yuta Suenaga (末永雄太, Suenaga Yūta; born April 7, 1985) is a Japanese swimmer, who specialized in breaststroke events. He attained a top eight finish in the 100 m breaststroke at the 2007 Summer Universiade in Bangkok, Thailand, and had been selected to represent Japan at the 2008 Summer Olympics. Suenaga is an economics graduate at Hosei University in Tokyo.

Suenaga competed in a breaststroke double at the 2008 Summer Olympics in Beijing. Leading up to the Games, he cleared FINA A-standard entry times of 1:00.72 (100 m breaststroke) and 2:10.17 (200 m breaststroke) at the Olympic Trials in Tokyo. In the 100 m breaststroke, Suenaga posted a thirteenth fastest time of 1:00.67 on the first day of preliminaries to secure his spot for the semifinals. Followed by the next morning's session, Suenaga failed to qualify for the final, as he finished his semifinal run by matching his time and placement from the heats. Four days later, 200 m breaststroke, Suenaga missed the semifinals by 0.11 of a second, as he shared his seventeenth-place tie with Norway's Alexander Dale Oen in 2:11.30.
