= Jaime López (pentathlete) =

Spanish modern pentathlete (born 1986)

Personal information
- Full name: Jaime López Sánchez
- Nationality: Spain
- Born: 13 February 1986 (age 40) Telde, Las Palmas, Spain
- Height: 1.86 m (6 ft 1 in)
- Weight: 80 kg (176 lb)

Sport
- Sport: Modern pentathlon

Jaime López Sánchez (born 13 February 1986 in Telde, Las Palmas) is a Spanish modern pentathlete. Lopez competed for the men's event, at the 2008 Summer Olympics in Beijing. During the competition, Lopez made a strong start in the early segments, until he fell off by his horse Gege and did not finish the run in the riding segment. After a disastrous fall from his horse and a broken leg, he abruptly finished in last place, with a score of 4,196 points.
