= Carlos Prieto (handballer) =

Spanish handball player (born 1980)

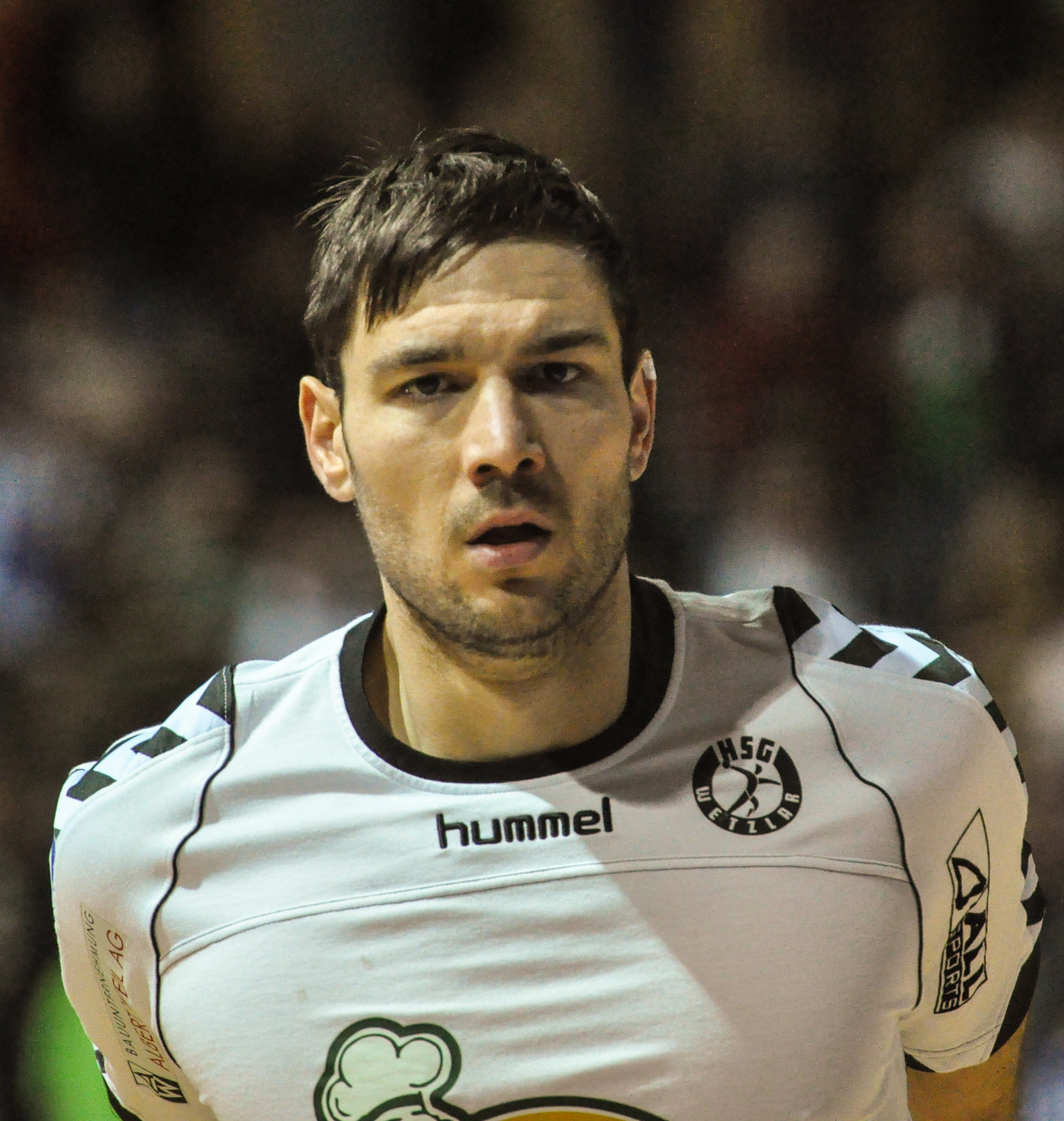

Personal information
- Full name: Carlos Prieto Martos
- Nationality: Spanish
- Born: 2 January 1980 (age 46) Mérida, Spain
- Height: 203 cm (80 in)

Sport
- Sport: Handball
- Position: Pivot
- Number: 4

Senior clubs
- Years: Team
- 1997–1999: FC Barcelona
- 1999-2002: CBM Gáldar
- 2002-2007: BM Ciudad Real
- 2007-2009: BM Valladolid
- 2009-2010: Rhein-Neckar Löwen
- 2010-2012: RK Celje
- 2012: Bergischer HC
- 2012: AG København
- 2012-2013: Kadetten Schaffhausen
- 2013-2016: HSG Wetzlar
- 2017-2018: HSG Lollar/Ruttershausen
- 2019: TV Hüttenberg
- 2019: New York City THC
- 2019-2021: TSV 1846 Lohr
- 2022: ESG Gensungen/Felsberg
National team
Years	Team	Apps	(Gls)
1993–2004	Spain	87	(140)
Medal record
Representing Spain
Summer Olympics
Bronze medal – third place	2008 Beijing	Team

Carlos Prieto (born 2 February 1980 in Mérida, Spain) is a Spanish handball player. From 2013 to 2016 Prieto played for the German Bundesliga club HSG Wetzlar.

He participated at the 2008 summer Olympics in Beijing as a member of the Spain men's national handball team. The team won a bronze medal, defeating Croatia. Prieto scored 7 goals, being one of the top scorers of the Spanish team.

He was included in the European Handball Federation Hall of Fame in 2023.
