= Borja Iradier =

Spanish swimmer

Personal information
- Full name: Borja Iradier Aguirrezabalaga
- Nationality: Spain
- Born: 23 March 1980 (age 46) San Sebastián, Guipúzcoa, Spain
- Height: 1.92 m (6 ft 4 in)
- Weight: 84 kg (185 lb)

Sport
- Sport: Swimming
- Strokes: breaststroke

Borja Iradier Aguirrezabalaga (March 23, 1980 in San Sebastián, Guipúzcoa, Spain) is a Spanish breaststroke swimmer.

At the 2007 Spanish National Championships, Iradier led Day three of the championship.
