= Lidia Redondo =

Spanish rhythmic gymnast

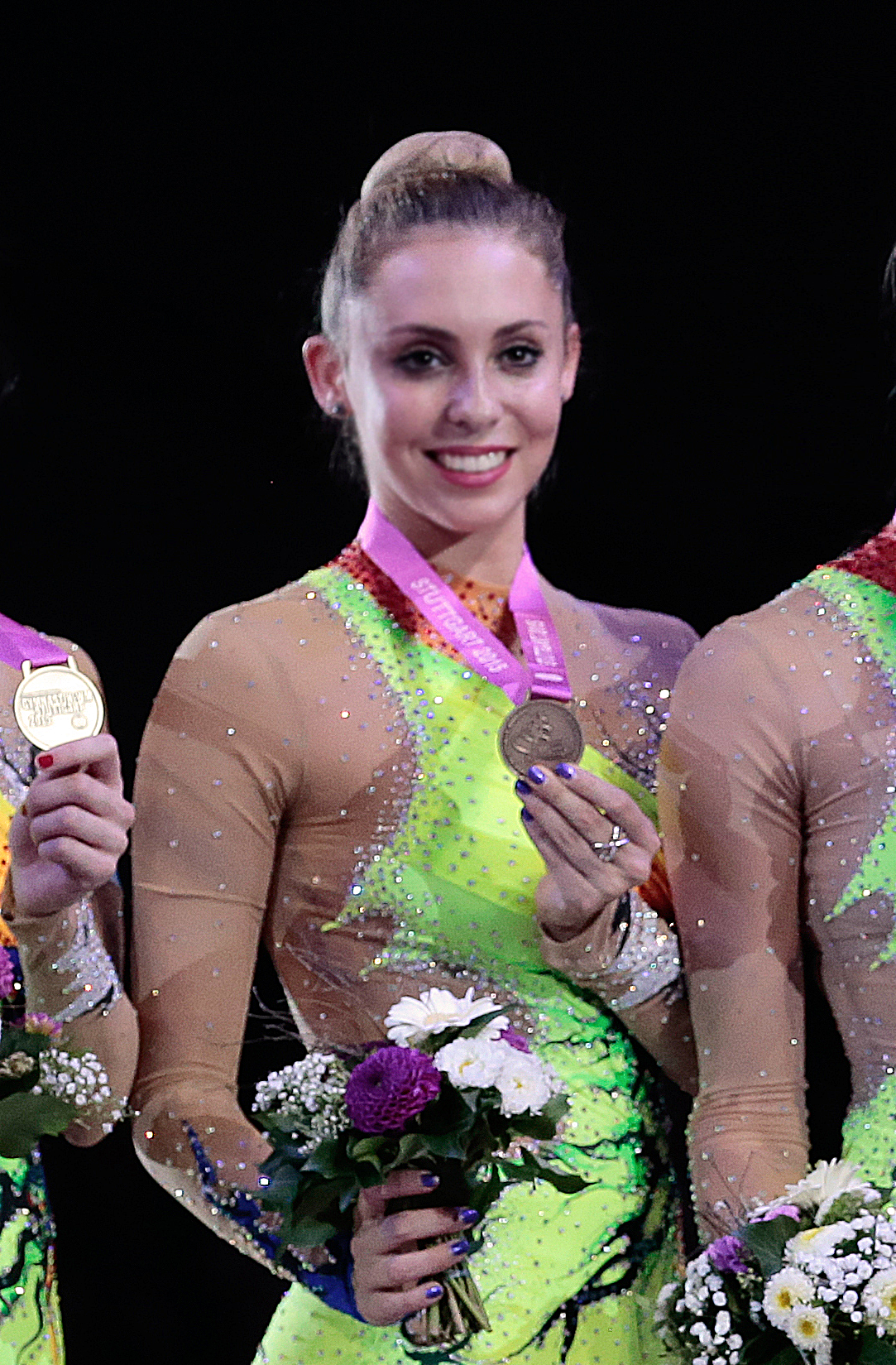

Personal information
- Full name: Lidia Redondo Ruiz de Arévalo
- Born: 7 March 1992 (age 34)

Gymnastics career
- Discipline: Rhythmic gymnastics
- Country represented: Spain (2009-)

Lidia Redondo Ruiz de Arévalo (Note: In this Spanish name, the first or paternal surname is Redondo and the second or maternal family name is Ruiz de Arévalo.) (born 7 March 1992) is a Spanish group rhythmic gymnast. She represents her nation at international competitions.

She participated at the 2012 Summer Olympics in London. She also competed at world championships, including at the 2009, 2010, 2011 and 2015 World Rhythmic Gymnastics Championships. She also competed at the 2015 European Games in Baku.

== Detailed Olympic results ==
Year	Competition Description	Location	Music	Apparatus	Rank	Score-Final	Rank	Score-Qualifying
2012	Olympics	London		All-around	4th	54.950	5th	54.550
2012	Olympics	London	Red Violin Remix (Aranjuez) by Ikuko Kawai	5 Balls	5th	27.400	5th	27.150
2012	Olympics	London	Malagueña by Stanley Black And His Orchestra, Placido Domingo	3 Ribbons / 2 Hoops	3rd	27.550	3rd	27.400
