= Bárbara González =

Spanish rhythmic gymnast

Barbara González
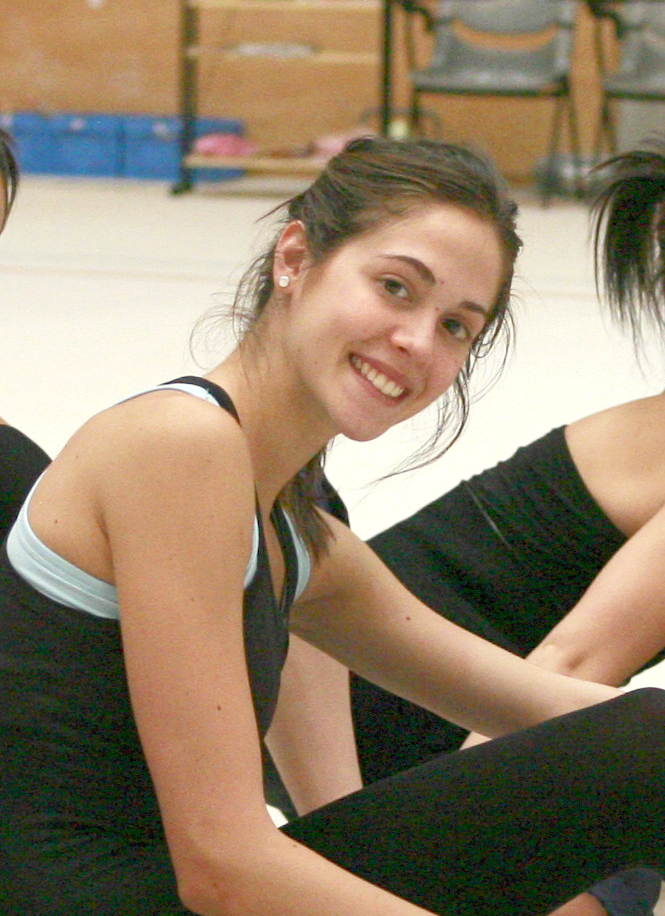
- González in 2007

Personal information
- Full name: Barbara González Oteiza
- Born: 15 January 1985 (age 41) Pamplona, Spain

Gymnastics career
- Discipline: Rhythmic gymnastics
- Country represented: Spain (2004–2008)

Barbara González Oteiza (born 15 January 1985) is a Spanish model and former group rhythmic gymnast. She represented her nation at international competitions.

== Biography ==
Originally from Pamplona, she participated at the 2004 Summer Olympics and the 2008 Summer Olympics in Beijing. She also competed at world championships, including at the 2005 and 2007 World Rhythmic Gymnastics Championships. Barbara is the sister of rhythmic gymnast Lara González.
