= Verónica Ruíz =

Spanish rhythmic gymnast

Veronica Ruiz
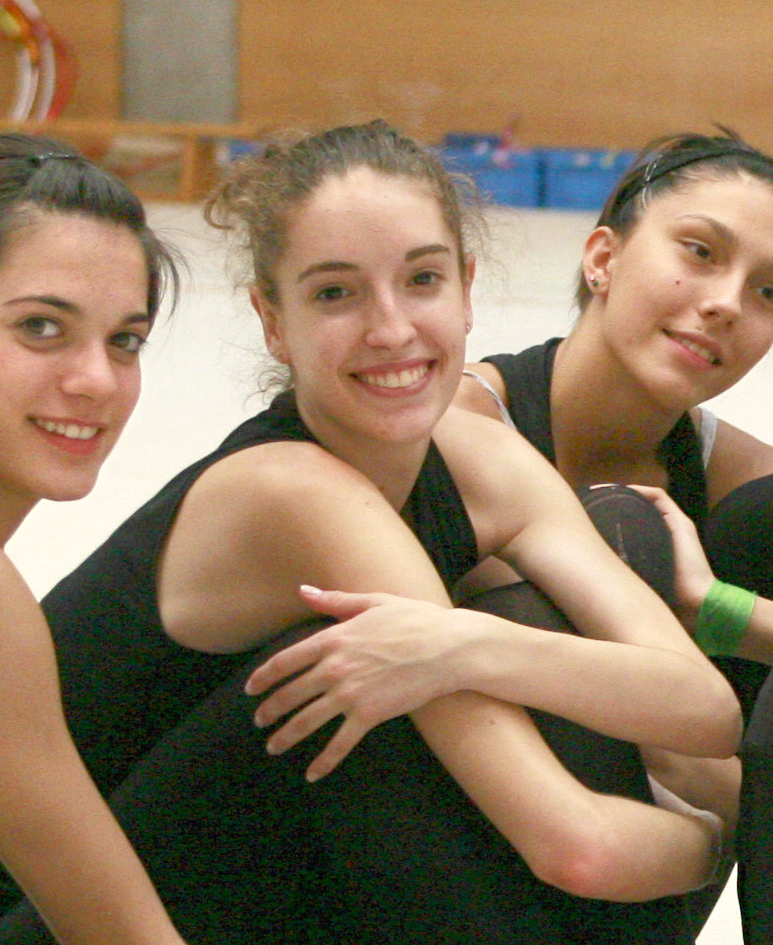

Personal information
- Full name: Veronica Ruiz
- Born: 23 January 1989 (age 37) Huelva, Spain

Gymnastics career
- Discipline: Rhythmic gymnastics
- Country represented: Spain; (2007-2008 (?))

Veronica Ruiz (born 23 January 1989) was a Spanish group rhythmic gymnast. She represents her nation at international competitions.

She participated at the 2008 Summer Olympics in Beijing. She also competed at world championships, including at the 2007 World Rhythmic Gymnastics Championships.
