= Elisabeth Salom =

Spanish rhythmic gymnast

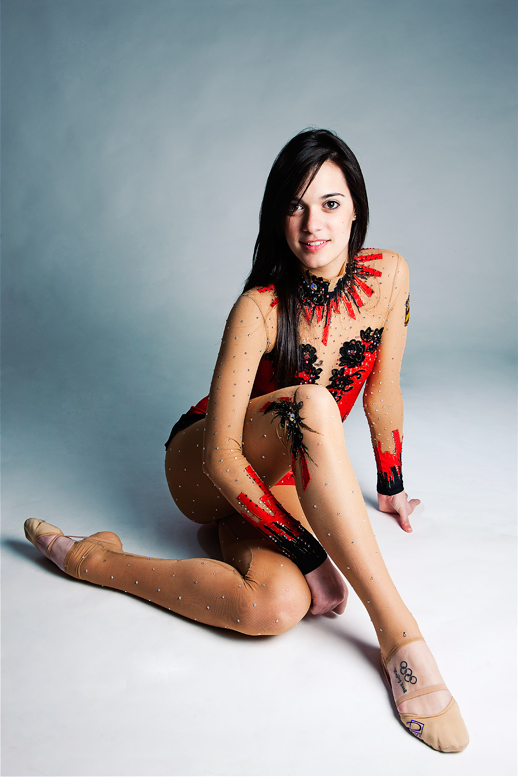
- Salom in 2009

Personal information
- Full name: Elisabeth Salom Pons
- Born: 20 January 1989 (age 37)

Gymnastics career
- Discipline: Rhythmic gymnastics
- Country represented: Spain (2007)

Elisabeth Salom Pons (Note: In this Spanish name, the first or paternal surname is Salom and the second or maternal family name is Pons.) (born 20 January 1989) is a Spanish group rhythmic gymnast. She represents her nation at international competitions.

She participated at the 2008 Summer Olympics in Beijing. She also competed at world championships, including at the 2007 World Rhythmic Gymnastics Championships.
