= Nuria Velasco =

Spanish rhythmic gymnast

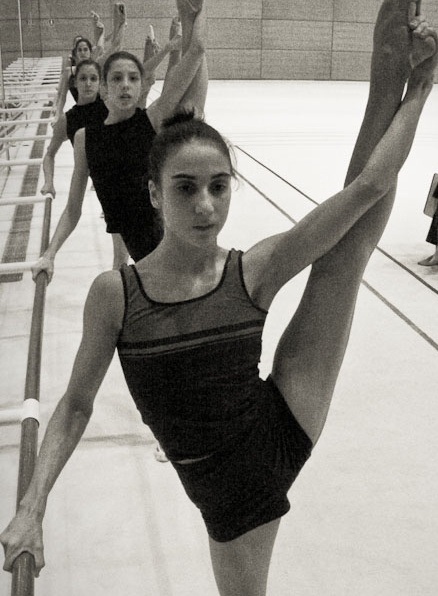

Personal information
- Born: 2 March 1985 (age 41) Lleida, Spain

Gymnastics career
- Discipline: Rhythmic gymnastics
- Country represented: Spain (2004-2005 (?))

Nuria Velasco (born 2 March 1985) is a Spanish group rhythmic gymnast. She represents her nation at international competitions.

Velasco participated at the 2004 Summer Olympics in Athens. She also competed at world championships, including at the 2005 World Rhythmic Gymnastics Championships in Baku, Azerbaijan.
