= Lara González (rhythmic gymnast) =

Spanish rhythmic gymnast

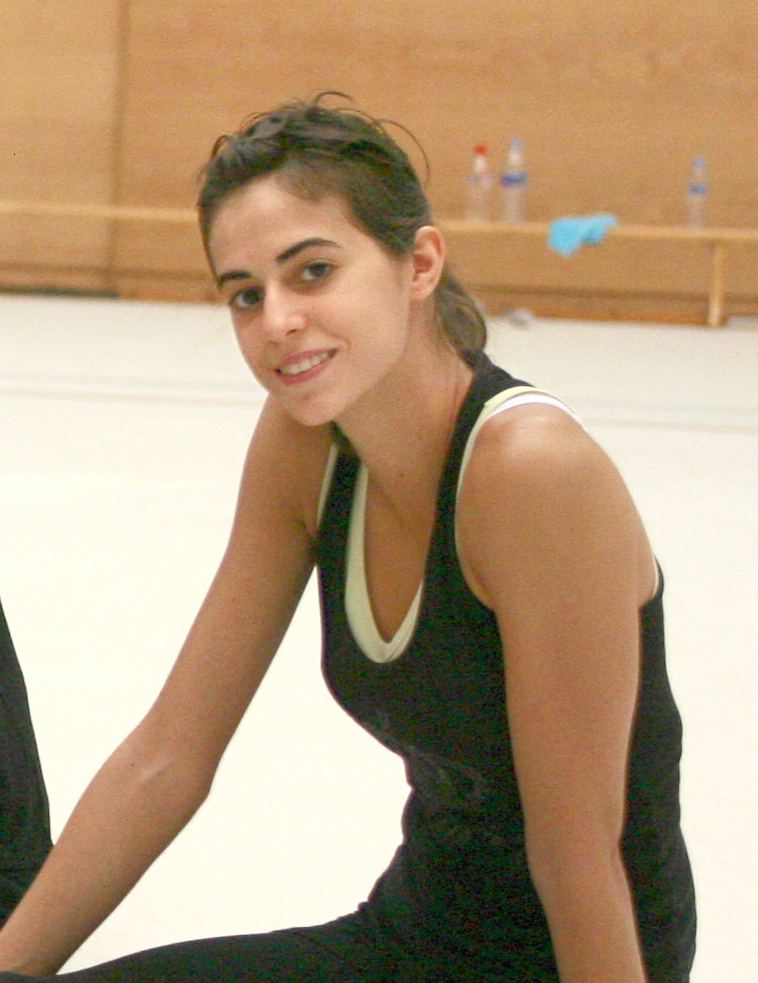
- González in 2007

Personal information
- Full name: Lara González Oteiza
- Born: 14 April 1986 (age 40) Pamplona, Spain
- Height: 180 cm (5 ft 11 in)

Gymnastics career
- Discipline: Rhythmic gymnastics
- Country represented: Spain (2005–2008)

Lara González Oteiza (Note: In this Spanish name, the first or paternal surname is González and the second or maternal family name is Oteiza.) (born 14 April 1986) is a Spanish former group rhythmic gymnast. She represented Spain at international competitions.

== Biography ==
Originally from Pamplona, she participated at the 2008 Summer Olympics in Beijing. She also competed at world championships, including at the 2005 and 2007 World Rhythmic Gymnastics Championships. Lara is the sister of rhythmic gymnast Barbara González.
