= Isabel Pagán =

Spanish rhythmic gymnast

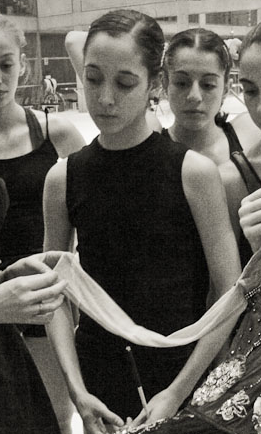

Personal information
- Born: 24 July 1986 (age 40) Orihuela, Alicante, Spain

Gymnastics career
- Discipline: Rhythmic gymnastics
- Country represented: Spain (2004-2008 (?))

Isabel Pagán (born 24 July 1986) is a Spanish group rhythmic gymnast. She represents her nation at international competitions.

She participated at the 2004 Summer Olympics in Athens and 2008 Summer Olympics in Beijing. She also competed at world championships, including at the 2005 and 2007 World Rhythmic Gymnastics Championships.
