= Tapirira mexicana =

Scientific classification
- Kingdom: Plantae
- Clade: Tracheophytes
- Clade: Angiosperms
- Clade: Eudicots
- Clade: Rosids
- Order: Sapindales
- Family: Anacardiaceae
- Genus: Tapirira
- Species: T. mexicana

Binomial name
- Tapirira mexicana Marchand

Species of tree

Tapirira mexicana is a species of rainforest tree in the family Anacardiaceae of Central America and Mexico (in the states of Chiapas, Oaxaca, Puebla, and Veracruz). The tree requires intense sunlight for its saplings to establish.
