= Hôtel de Ville, Thiais =

Town hall in Thiais, France

Hôtel de Ville
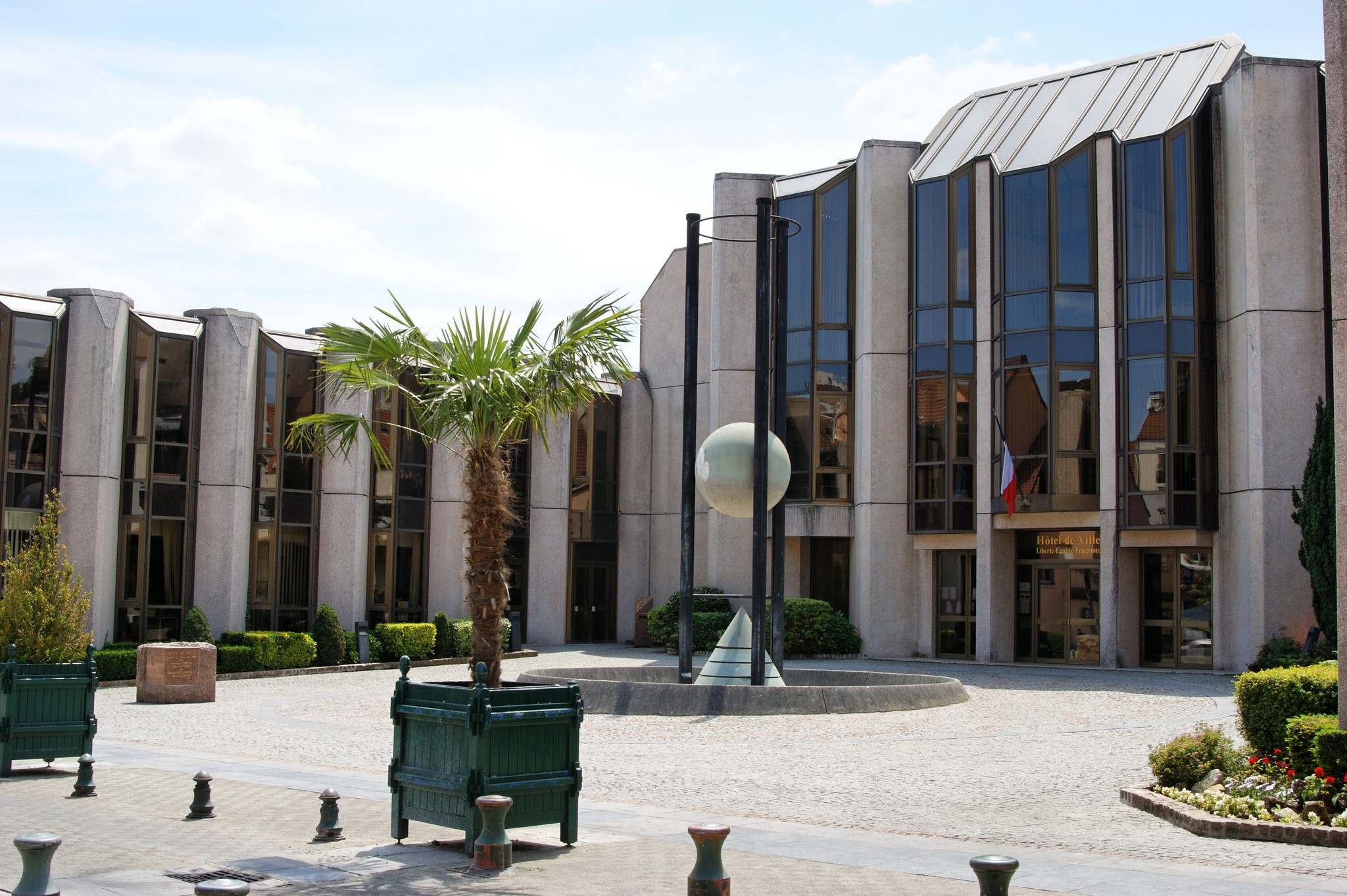
- The main frontage of the Hôtel de Ville in June 2009
- Interactive map of the Hôtel de Ville area

General information
- Type: City hall
- Architectural style: Modern style
- Location: Thiais, France
- Coordinates: 48.7641°N 2.3912°E
- Completed: 1984

Design and construction
- Architect: Bernard Gustin

The Hôtel de Ville (French pronunciation: [otɛl də vil], City Hall) is a municipal building in Thiais, Val-de-Marne in the southern suburbs of Paris, standing on Rue Maurepas.

== History ==
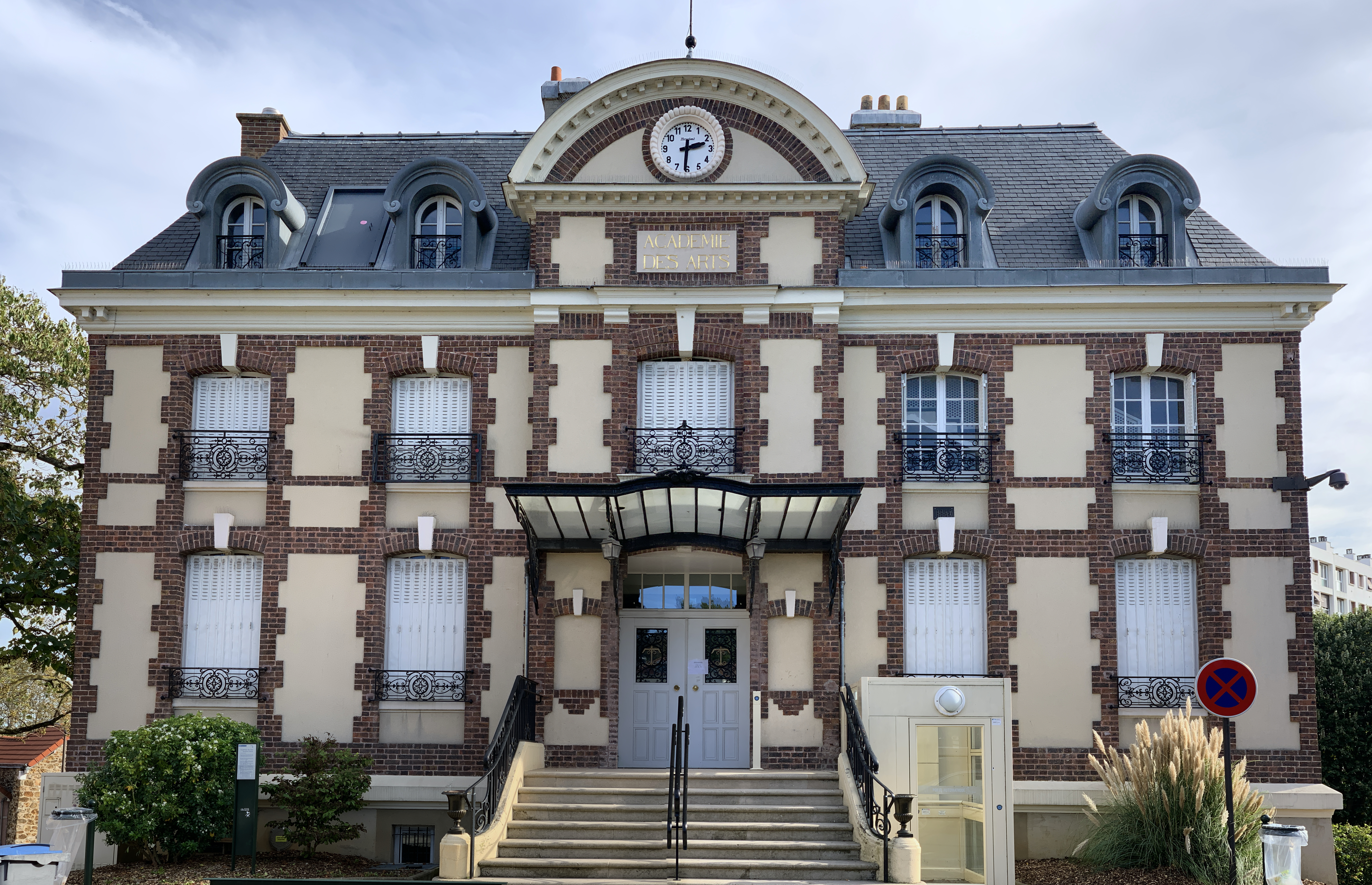
The second town hall

Following the French Revolution, the town council initially met in the house of the mayor at the time. This changed in the late 1830s, when the council led by the mayor, Pierre Marie Taillefer, decided to commission the first town hall on Rue de la Limage (now Rue Chèvre d'Autreville). This building was designed by Sieur Molin and completed in 1840.

However, in the 1880s, the council decided to commission a more substantial town hall. The site they selected for the second town hall was on what is now Place du Général Leclerc. The building was designed by Albert Thomas in the neoclassical style, built in red brick with cement render panelling and was officially opened by the mayor, Nestor Léon Marchand, on 10 August 1884.

The design involved a symmetrical main frontage of five bays facing onto Place du Général Leclerc. The central bay featured a flight of steps leading up to a double doorway with a glass canopy. There was a French door with voussoirs, a keystone and a red brick surround on the first floor, and a rectangular panel surmounted by a modillioned segmental pediment with a clock in the tympanum at roof level. There was an octagonal belfry behind the pediment. The other bays were fenestrated by segmental headed windows with voussoirs, keystones and red brick surrounds on the first two floors, and by dormer windows at attic level. The red brick detailing was also used at the corners of the building to form quoins. Internally, the main reception rooms were decorated with murals painted by Pierre Vauthier in 1904 and by Jules Wielhorski in 1913.

A sculpture depicting a winged woman with a crocodile was created by Jacques Froment-Meurice and unveiled in front of the building in 1900. After the building was no longer required for municipal purposes, it became the Académie des Arts (Academy of Arts).

In the early 1980s, following significant population growth, the council decided to commission a modern town hall. The site they selected was on the south side of Rue Maurepas. The new building was designed by Bernard Gustin in the modern style, built in concrete and glass and was officially opened by the future president of France, Jacques Chirac, on 7 December 1984.

The design involved a symmetrical main frontage of 13 bays facing onto Rue Maurepas, with the last four bays on each side projected forward as wings. The central section of five bays incorporated glass doorways on the ground floor and tall oriel windows spanning the first and second floors above. The central three bays and the outer bays of the central section were flanked by full-height triangular concrete piers. The wings were only two stories high but were also fenestrated by full-height oriel windows separated by triangular piers. Internally, the principal room was the Salle du Conseil (council chamber).
