= Commonly misspelled words in French =

Misspellings in French are a subset of errors in French orthography.

Many errors are caused by homonyms; for example, French contains hundreds of words ending with IPA [εn] written as -ène, -en, -enne or -aine.

Many French words end with silent consonants, lettres muettes, creating, in effect, homonyms. The following verb endings are all pronounced the same: tu parles, il parle and ils parlent; there can also be confusion around the similar sounding je parlais and je parlai. Homonyms also occur with diacritics – for instance, il eut dit compared with il eût dit.

Further problems are caused by examples of confusion with English, such as connection (incorrect) and connexion (correct).

Misspellings of French words outside the French language occur often and account for part of the etymology of some modern loanwords in English, such as English "caddie".

== See also ==
- fr:Faute d'orthographe
- fr:Wikipédia:Liste de fautes d'orthographe courantes
