= Lycée Guillaume Apollinaire =

Lycée Guillaume Apollinaire may refer to:

- Lycée Guillaume Apollinaire (Thiais)
- Lycée Guillaume Apollinaire (Nice)
