= French letters =

French letters may refer to:

- French Alphabet
- Condom, a British English euphemism
