= Tapirira obtusa =

Conservation status
- Least Concern (IUCN 3.1)

Scientific classification
- Kingdom: Plantae
- Clade: Tracheophytes
- Clade: Angiosperms
- Clade: Eudicots
- Clade: Rosids
- Order: Sapindales
- Family: Anacardiaceae
- Genus: Tapirira
- Species: T. obtusa

Binomial name
- Tapirira obtusa (Benth.) J.D.Mitchell

Synonyms
- Mauria obtusa Benth.; Tapirira marchandii Engl.; Tapirira pao-pombo var. major Marchand; Tapirira peckoltiana Engl.

Species of flowering plant

Tapirira obtusa is a species of plant in the family Anacardiaceae. It is native to South America and can be found in Bolivia, Brazil, Colombia, Ecuador, French Guiana, Guyana, Suriname, and Venezuela.
