= Orly =

- Commune
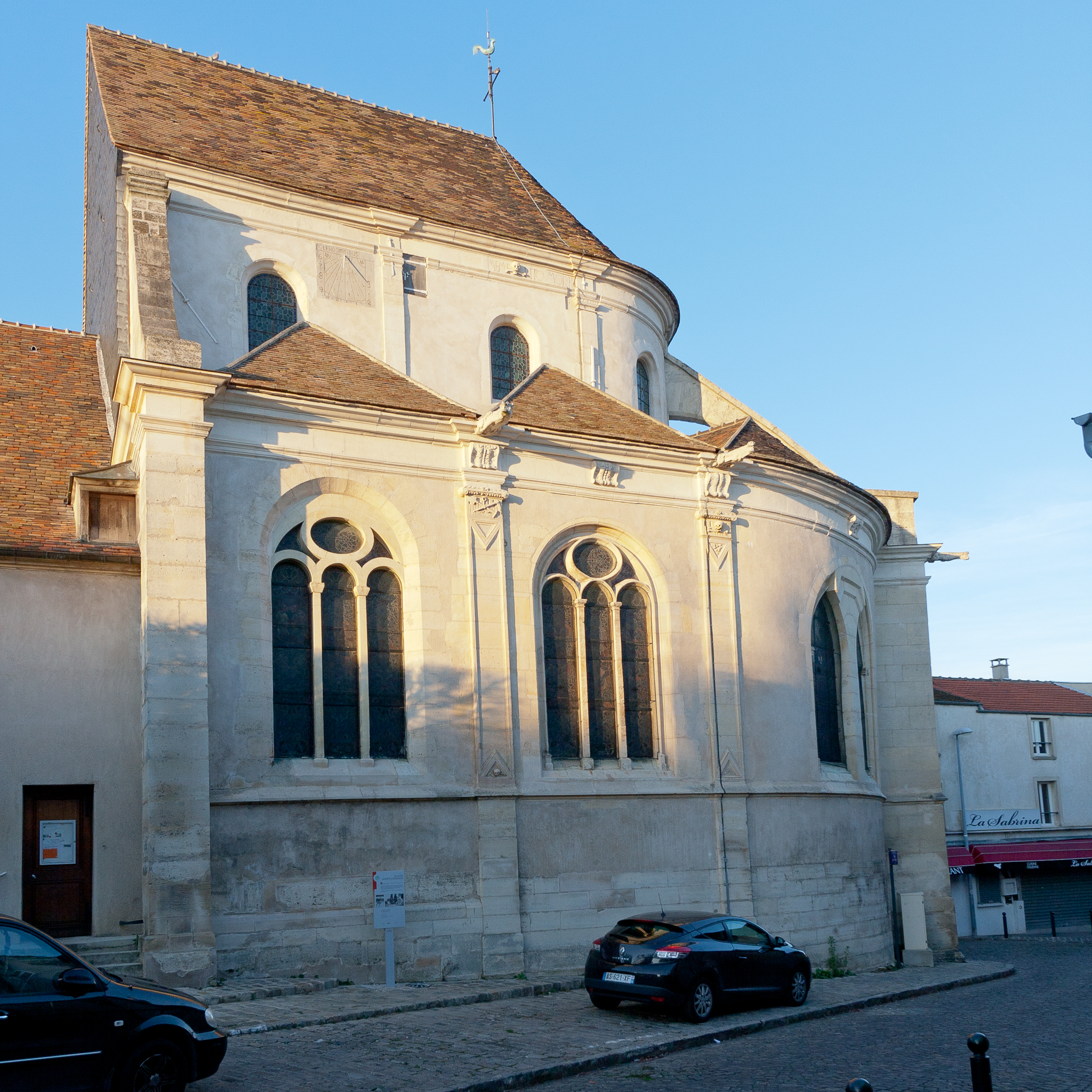
- The church of Saint-Germain-de-Paris, in Orly

- Coat of arms

- Location (in red) within Paris inner suburbs
- Location of Orly
- Location within France Location within Île-de-France (region)
- Coordinates: 48°44′42″N 2°23′58″E
- Country: France
- Region: Île-de-France
- Department: Val-de-Marne
- Arrondissement: L'Haÿ-les-Roses
- Canton: Orly
- Intercommunality: Grand Paris

Government
  - Mayor (2026–32): Imène Souid
- Area^{1}: 6.69 km^{2} (2.58 sq mi)
- Elevation: 59 m (194 ft)
- Population (2023): 24,658
  - Density: 3,690/km^{2} (9,550/sq mi)
- Demonym(s): Orlysien, Orlysienne
- Time zone: UTC+01:00 (CET)
  - Summer (DST): UTC+02:00 (CEST)
- INSEE/Postal code: 94054 /94310
- Website: mairie-orly.fr
- ^{1} French Land Register data, which excludes lakes, ponds, glaciers > 1 km^{2} (0.386 sq mi or 247 acres) and river estuaries.

Orly (French pronunciation: [ɔʁli]) is a commune in Val-de-Marne, Île-de-France, France. It is in the southern suburbs of Paris, 12.7 km (7.9 mi) from the centre of Paris, on the departmental border with Essonne.

The name of Orly came from Latin Aureliacum, "the villa of Aurelius". Orly Airport partially lies on the territory of the commune of Orly, which gave its name to the airport.

== History ==
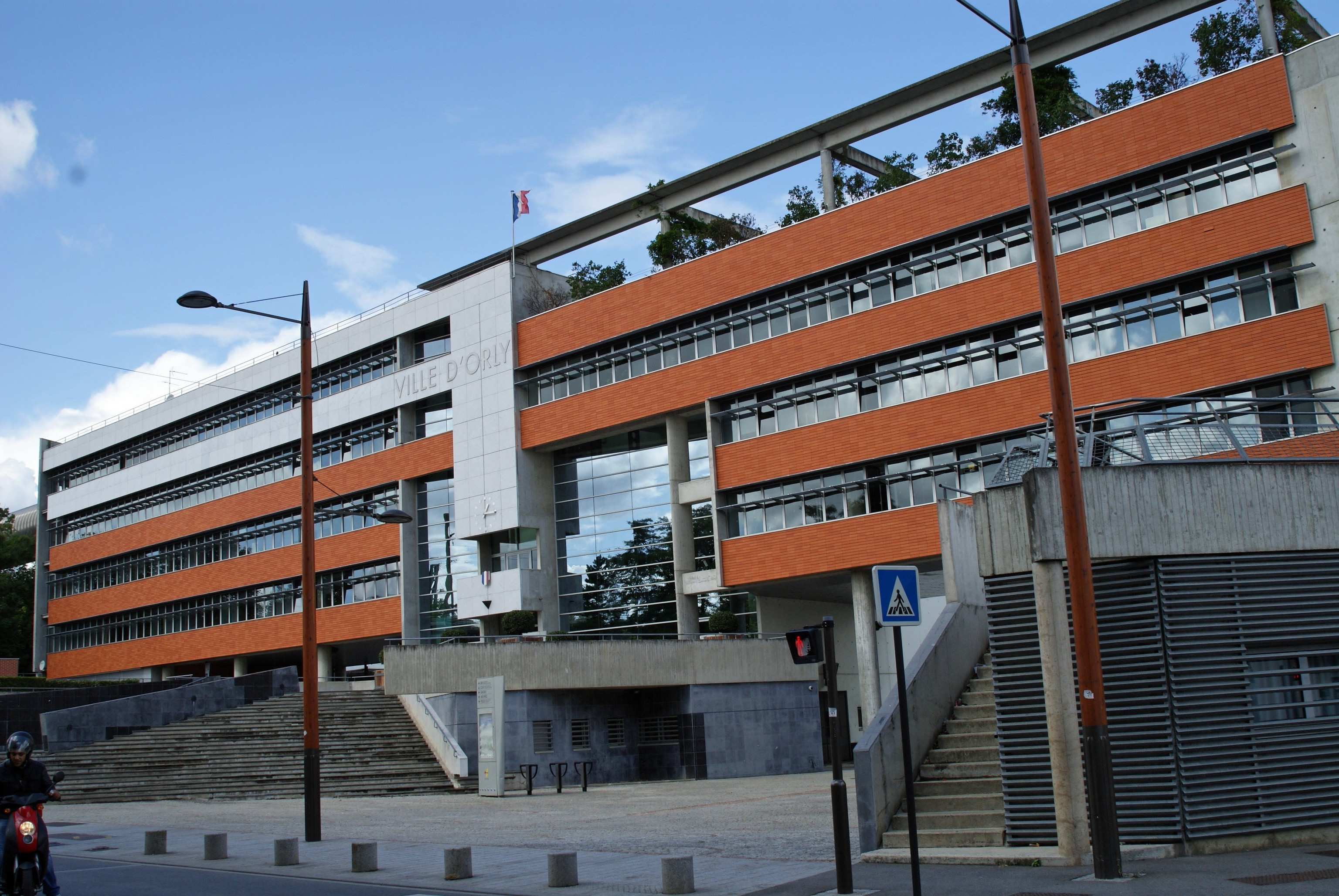
The Hôtel de Ville

The Hôtel de Ville was completed in 1997.

== Public housing ==
Orly experienced significant growth in the late 1950s. There was an urgent need to house poor families living in overcrowded and unsanitary conditions. Orly responded to Abbé Pierre's call in 1954. It was also intended to house the immigrant workers arriving en masse in the Paris region.

== Population ==
Historical population

Year	Pop.	±% p.a.
1793	441	—
1821	511	+0.53%
1846	542	+0.24%
1872	704	+1.01%
1886	818	+1.08%
1901	856	+0.30%
1911	893	+0.42%
1921	1,381	+4.46%
1926	3,691	+21.73%
1931	5,414	+7.96%
1936	6,132	+2.52%
1946	6,017	−0.19%

Year	Pop.	±% p.a.
1954	7,624	+3.00%
1962	17,637	+11.05%
1968	30,197	+9.38%
1975	26,104	−2.06%
1982	23,766	−1.33%
1990	21,646	−1.16%
1999	20,470	−0.62%
2007	21,117	+0.39%
2012	21,628	+0.48%
2017	23,801	+1.93%
2023	24,658	+0.59%

Source: EHESS and INSEE (1968–2023)

== Transport ==
Orly is served by two stations on Paris RER line C: Les Saules and Orly-Ville.

== Education ==
Schools in Orly:

- Preschools (écoles maternelles): Cité Jardins, Jean Moulin, Joliot-Curie, Marcel Cachin, Noyer-Grenot, Paul Éluard, Romain Rolland
- Elementary schools (écoles élémentaires): Cité Jardins, Centre, Jean Moulin, Joliot-Curie, Marcel Cachin A and B, Paul Éluard A and B, Romain Rolland A and B
- Junior high schools: Collège Dorval and Collège Desnos
- One senior high school/sixth-form college: Lycée des métiers Armand Guillaumin

Lycée Guillaume Apollinaire, a senior high/sixth-form in Thiais; and Lycée Georges Brassens, a senior high/sixth-form in Villeneuve-le-Roi, are nearby.

== Personalities ==
- Kery James, rapper
- Dry, rapper
- Jean Fernand, an impressionist painter
- Auguste Marie, psychiatrist

== See also ==
- Communes of the Val-de-Marne department
