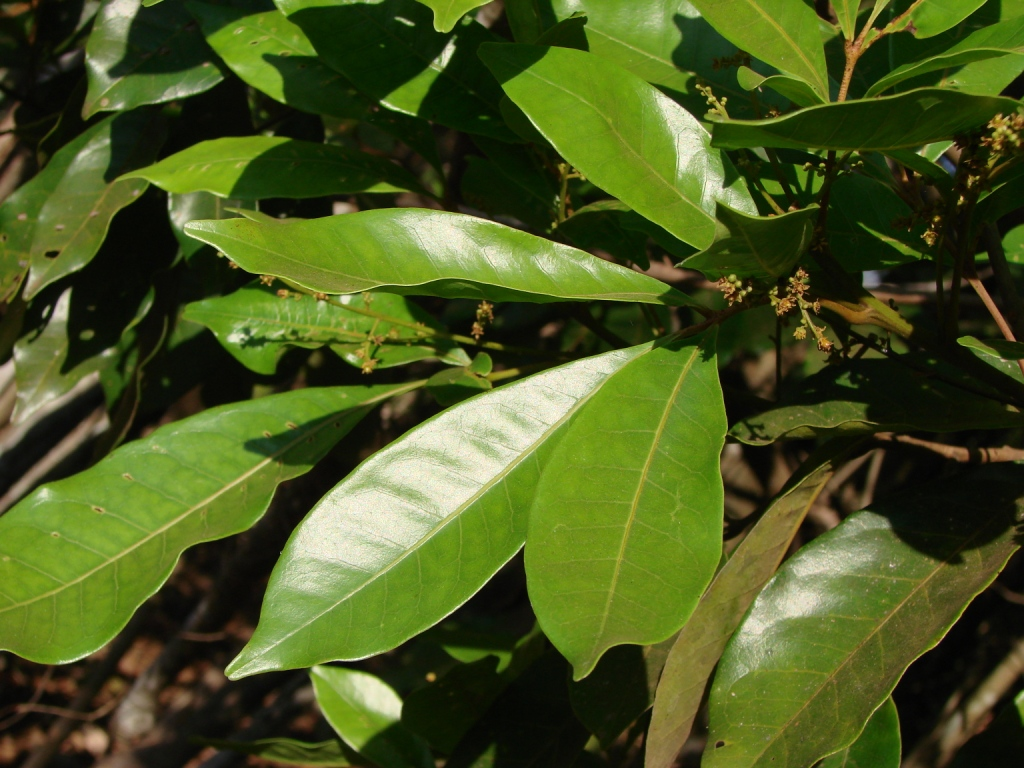
- Tapirira guianensis

Scientific classification
- Kingdom: Plantae
- Clade: Tracheophytes
- Clade: Angiosperms
- Clade: Eudicots
- Clade: Rosids
- Order: Sapindales
- Family: Anacardiaceae
- Subfamily: Spondiadoideae
- Genus: Tapirira; Aubl. (1775)

Species
- See text

Synonyms
- Joncquetia Schreb. (1789); Marupa Miers (1873); Odina Netto (1866), nom. illeg.; Salabertia Neck. (1790), opus utique oppr.

= Tapirira =

Genus of flowering plants

Tapirira is a genus of flowering plants in the family Anacardiaceae. It includes nine species native to the tropical Americas, ranging from southern Mexico through Central America and northern South America to Bolivia, Paraguay, and southern Brazil.

== Species ==
As of January 2024, Plants of the World Online accepts nine species.

- Tapirira bethanniana J.D.Mitch.
- Tapirira chimalapana T.Wendt & J.D.Mitch.
- Tapirira guianensis Aubl.
- Tapirira lepidota Aguilar & Hammel
- Tapirira mexicana Marchand
- Tapirira obtusa (Benth.) J.D.Mitch.
- Tapirira pilosa Sprague
- Tapirira retusa Ducke
- Tapirira rubrinervis Barfod

Selected synonyms include:

- Tapirira marchandii Engl. — synonym of Tapirira obtusa
