= Hôtel de Ville, Orly =

Town hall in Orly, France

Hôtel de Ville
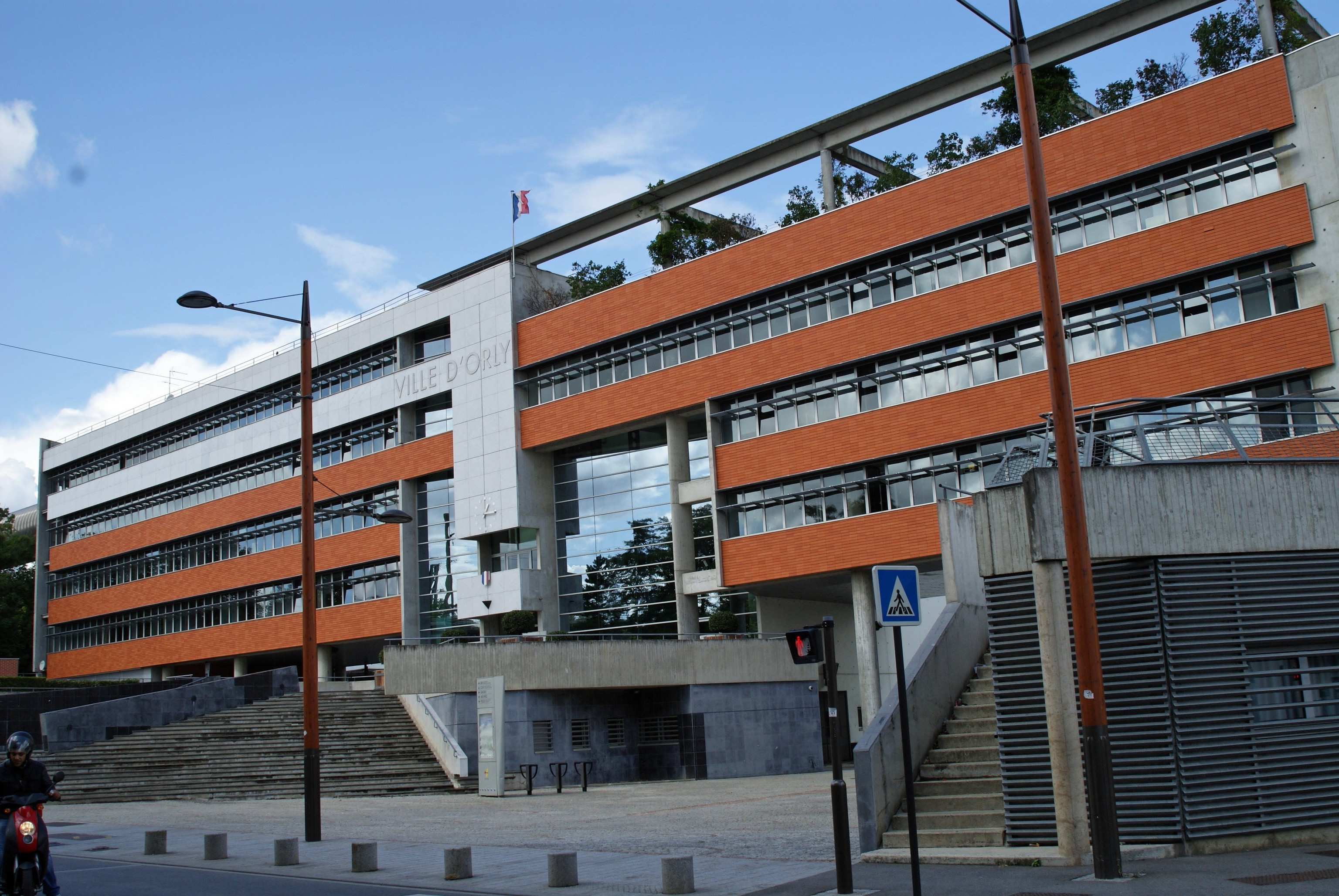
- The main frontage of the Hôtel de Ville in September 2009
- Interactive map of the Hôtel de Ville area

General information
- Type: City hall
- Architectural style: Modern style
- Location: Orly, France
- Coordinates: 48.7431°N 2.4006°E
- Completed: 1997

Design and construction
- Architect: Atelier Deroche

The Hôtel de Ville (French pronunciation: [otɛl də vil], City Hall) is a municipal building in Orly, Val-de-Marne, in the southern suburbs of Paris, standing on Place François Mitterrand.

== History ==
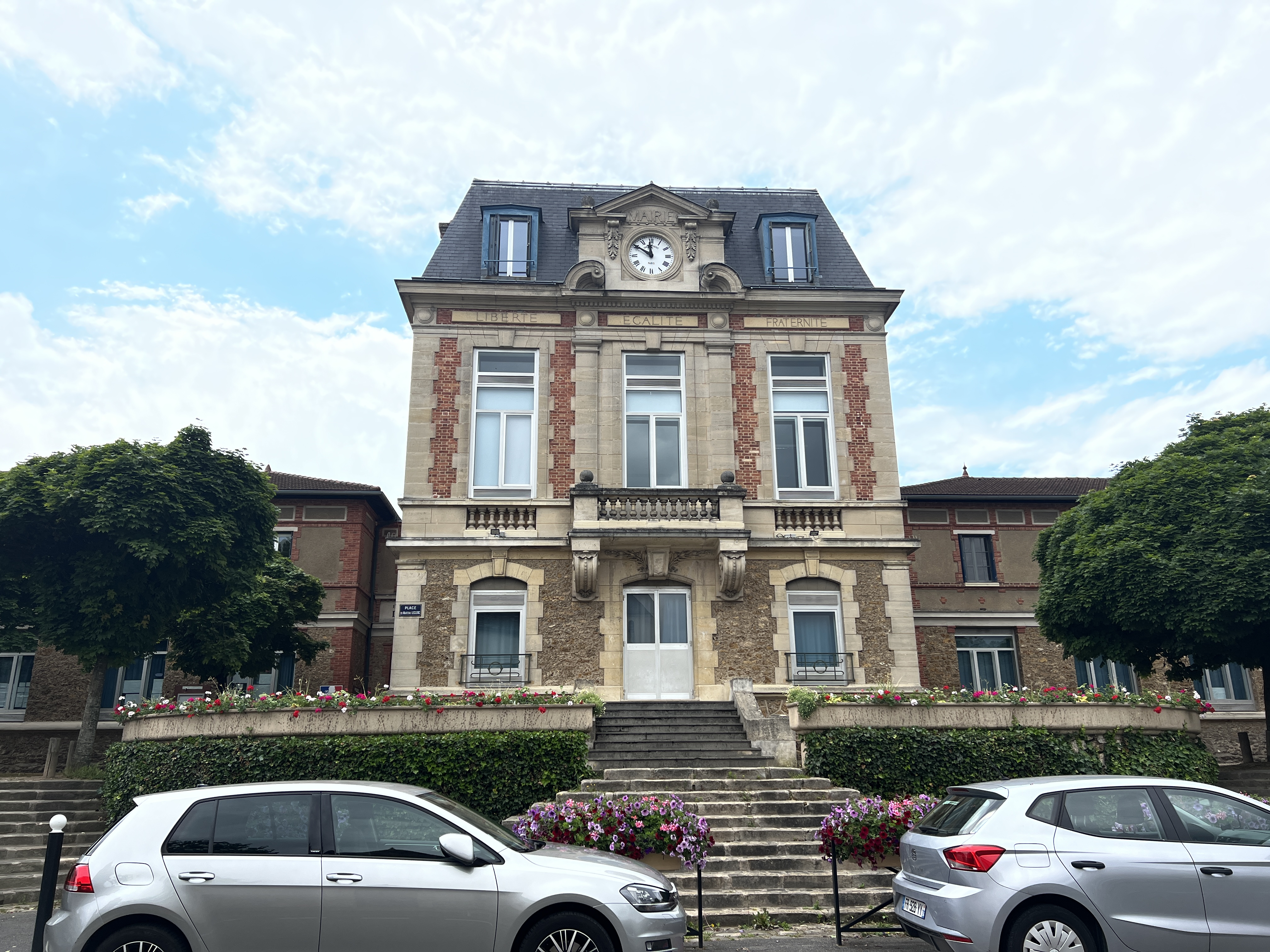
The first town hall

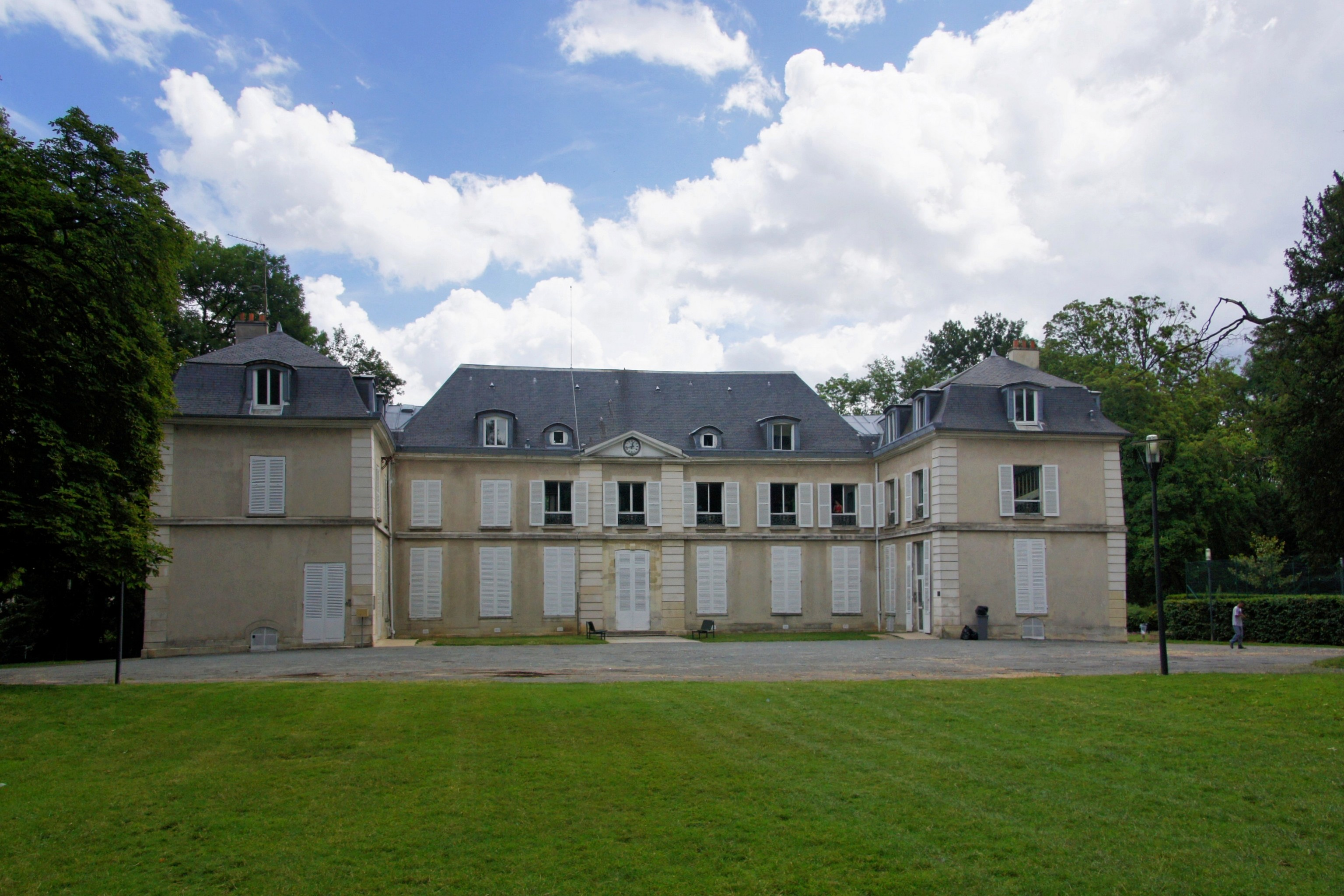
Château Guérin

Following the French Revolution, the town council initially met in the house of the mayor at the time before renting a room in the town from 1810. This arrangement continued until March 1835, when the council led by the mayor, Furcy Leroy de La Brière, decided to establish a dedicated town hall. The site they selected, on the west side of the town square (now Place du Général Leclerc), faced the Church of Saint-Germain. The council acquired it from a master wheelwright, Sieur Genty, for FFr 5,000. The new building was designed by Sieur Mollins in the neoclassical style, built in millstone and red brick with stone finishings at a cost of FFr 10,000 and was completed later that year.

The complex involved a central block and two wings. The central block contained the municipal office, while the left-hand wing accommodated the boys' school and the right-hand wing accommodated the girls' school. The wings were remodelled in 1858 and again in 1902.

The design of the central block involved a symmetrical main frontage of three bays facing onto the street. The central bay featured a segmental headed doorway with a keystone on the ground floor, a French door with a balustraded balcony on the first floor, and a clock above. The outer bays were fenestrated by segmental headed windows on the ground floor and by square headed windows on the first floor.

After the Second World War, the council led by the mayor, François Boidron, decided to acquire a more substantial building for municipal use. The building they selected was the Château Guérin which was set in a large park in the west of the town. The château was designed in the neoclassical style, built in brick with a cement render finish and was completed in the 17th century. It was owned by the former mayor, Auguste-Louis Guérin, during the second half of the 19th century. It became a drink rehabilitation clinic, l'Etablissement médical du docteur Piouffle, in 1914 and then a retirement home operated by film industry's mutual insurance company in 1932. The filmmaker, Georges Méliès, was one of the first occupants to move in. After being acquired by the council in December 1946, it was converted for municipal use and served as the town hall from 1949. The design involved a main block of seven bays and two wings, which projected forward to form a courtyard.

After the château was no longer required for municipal purposes, it served as a school for the film industry, before becoming the municipal school of arts. The park was re-landscaped in 2019.

In the late 20th century, following significant population growth, the council led by the mayor, Gaston Viens, decided to commission a modern town hall. The site they selected was on the west side of the railway line from Choisy-le-Roi to Massy-Verrières which cuts through the centre of the town. The new building was designed by Atelier Deroche in the modern style, built in concrete and glass and was completed in 1997.

The design involved a long main frontage facing onto Place François Mitterrand together with a steel footbridge across the railway line. The main frontage was faced with alternating bands of terracotta tiles and light-framed windows. Internally, the principal room was the Salle du Conseil (council chamber).
