= Tapirira chimalapana =

Conservation status
- Critically Endangered (IUCN 3.1)

Scientific classification
- Kingdom: Plantae
- Clade: Tracheophytes
- Clade: Angiosperms
- Clade: Eudicots
- Clade: Rosids
- Order: Sapindales
- Family: Anacardiaceae
- Genus: Tapirira
- Species: T. chimalapana

Binomial name
- Tapirira chimalapana T.Wendt & J.D.Mitchell

Species of tree

Tapirira chimalapana is a species of plant in the family Anacardiaceae. It is endemic to the Uxpanapa-Chimalapa area of eastern Mexico, in the states of Oaxaca and Veracruz.
