= Tapirira rubrinervis =

Conservation status
- Endangered (IUCN 3.1)

Scientific classification
- Kingdom: Plantae
- Clade: Tracheophytes
- Clade: Angiosperms
- Clade: Eudicots
- Clade: Rosids
- Order: Sapindales
- Family: Anacardiaceae
- Genus: Tapirira
- Species: T. rubrinervis

Binomial name
- Tapirira rubrinervis Barfod

Species of flowering plant

Tapirira rubrinervis is a species of plant in the family Anacardiaceae. It is endemic to Ecuador. Its natural habitats are subtropical or tropical moist lowland forests and subtropical or tropical moist montane forests. It is threatened by habitat loss.
