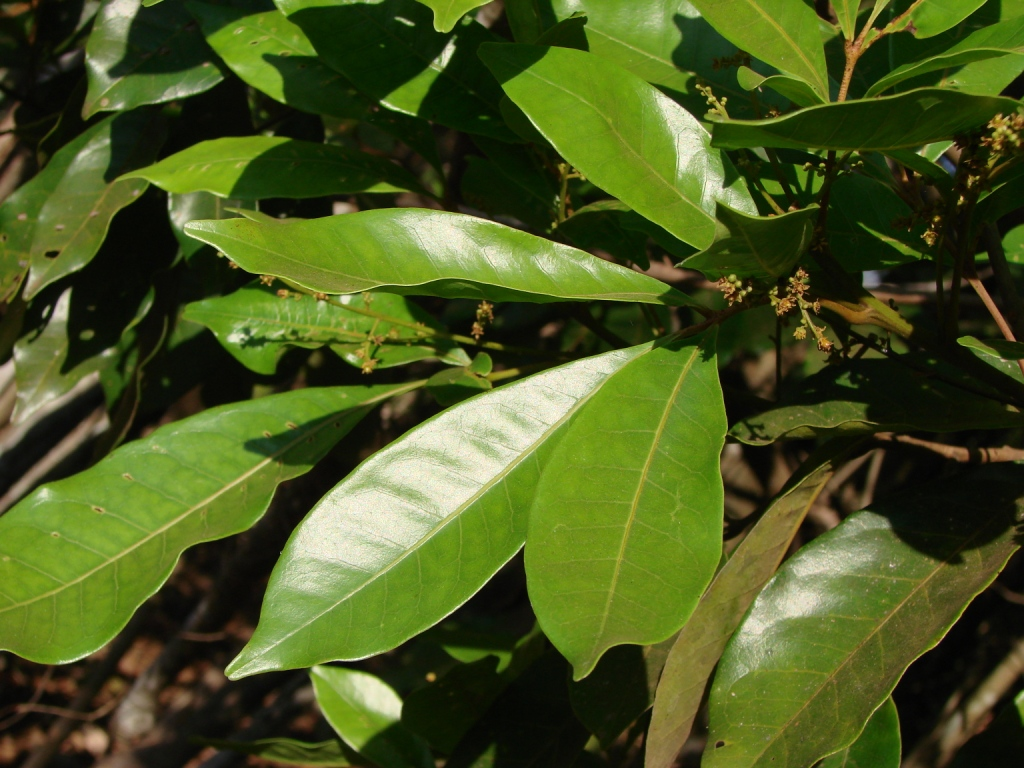

Scientific classification
- Kingdom: Plantae
- Clade: Tracheophytes
- Clade: Angiosperms
- Clade: Eudicots
- Clade: Rosids
- Order: Sapindales
- Family: Anacardiaceae
- Genus: Tapirira
- Species: T. guianensis

Binomial name
- Tapirira guianensis Aubl.

= Tapirira guianensis =

Species of tree

Tapirira guianensis is a species of plant in the family Anacardiaceae. It is native to Cerrado and Atlantic Forest (ecoregions) vegetation in Brazil.
