= Circumflex in French =

Diacritic used in French orthography

◌̂o

Circumflex
- U+0302 ̂ COMBINING CIRCUMFLEX ACCENT

The circumflex (ˆ) is one of the five diacritics used in French orthography. It may appear on the vowels a, e, i, o, and u, for example ô in "hôpital".

The circumflex, called l'accent circonflexe, has three primary functions in French:

- It affects the pronunciation of a, e, and o. Although it is used on i and u as well, it does not affect their pronunciation.
- It often indicates the historical presence of a letter, commonly s, that has become silent and fallen away in orthography over the course of linguistic evolution.
- It is used, less frequently, to distinguish between two homophones. For example, sur ('on/about') versus sûr ('sure/safe'), and du ('of the') versus dû ('due')

And in certain words, it is simply an orthographic convention.

== First usages ==
The circumflex first appeared in written French in the 16th century. It was borrowed from Ancient Greek, and combines the acute accent and the grave accent. Grammarian Jacques Dubois (known as Sylvius) is the first writer known to have used the Greek symbol in his writing (although he wrote in Latin).

Several grammarians of the French Renaissance attempted to prescribe a precise usage for the diacritic in their treatises on language. The modern usage of the circumflex accent became standardized in the 18th or 19th century.

=== Jacques Dubois (Sylvius) ===
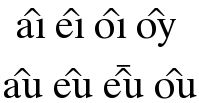

Sylvius used the circumflex to indicate so-called "false diphthongs". Early modern French as spoken in Sylvius' time had coalesced all its true diphthongs into phonetic monophthongs; that is, a pure vowel sound, one whose articulation at both beginning and end is relatively fixed, and which does not glide up or down towards a new position of articulation. He justifies its usage in his work Iacobii Sylvii Ambiani in Linguam Gallicam Isagoge una, cum eiusdem Grammatica Latinogallica ex Hebraeis Graecis et Latinus authoribus (An Introduction to the Gallic (French) Language, And Its Grammar With Regard to Hebrew, Latin and Greek Authors) published by Robert Estienne in 1531. A kind of grammatical survey of French written in Latin, the book relies heavily on the comparison of ancient languages to his contemporary French and explained the specifics of his language. At that time, all linguistic treatises used classical Latin and Greek as their models. Sylvius presents the circumflex in his list of typographic conventions, stating:

$\hat{a\imath}$, $\hat{e\imath}$, $\hat{o\imath}$, $\hat{oy}$, $\hat{au}$, $\hat{eu}$, $\hat{ou}$, diphthongorum notae, ut $m\hat{a\imath}$, $pl\hat{e\imath}n$, $m\hat{o\imath}$, $m\hat{oy}$, $c\hat{au}se$, $fl\hat{eu}r$, $p\hat{ou}r$, id est maius, plenus, mihi, mei, causa, flos, pro.

Translation: $\hat{a\imath}$, $\hat{e\imath}$, $\hat{o\imath}$, $\hat{oy}$, $\hat{au}$, $\hat{eu}$, $\hat{ou}$, are representations of diphthongs, such as $m\hat{a\imath}$, $pl\hat{e\imath}n$, $m\hat{o\imath}$, $m\hat{oy}$, $c\hat{au}se$, $fl\hat{eu}r$, $p\hat{ou}r$, or, in Latin, maius, plenus, mihi, mei, causa, flos, pro.

Sylvius was quite aware that the circumflex was purely a graphical convention. He showed that these diphthongs, even at that time, had been reduced to monophthongs, and used the circumflex to "join" the two letters that had historically been diphthongs into one phoneme. When two adjacent vowels were to be pronounced independently, Sylvius proposed using the diaeresis, called the tréma in French. Sylvius gives the example $tr\hat{a\imath}$ (French pronunciation: [tʁɛ] for je trais) as opposed to $tr\ddot{a\imath}$ ([tʁa.i] for je trahis). Even these groups, however, did not represent true diphthongs (such as the English try /traɪ/), but rather adjacent vowels pronounced separately without an intervening consonant. As French no longer had any true diphthongs, the diaeresis alone would have sufficed to distinguish between ambiguous vowel pairs. His circumflex was entirely unnecessary. As such the tréma became standardized in French orthography, and Sylvius' circumflex usage never caught on. But the grammarian had pointed out an important orthographical problem of the time.

At that time, the combination eu indicated two different pronunciations:

- /y/ as in sûr and mûr, written seur, meur (or as $s\hat{eu}r$ and $m\hat{eu}r$ in Sylvius' work), or
- /œ/ as in cœur and sœur, written by Sylvius not only with a circumflex, but a circumflex topped with a macron: $\overset{~_h}{c}\bar{\hat{eu}}r$ and $s\bar{\hat{eu}}r$ (Sylvius used to denote a hard c before e and i).

Sylvius' proposals were never adopted per se, but he opened the door for discussion among French grammarians to improve and disambiguate French orthography.

=== Étienne Dolet ===
Étienne Dolet, in his Maniere de bien traduire d'une langue en aultre : d'aduantage de la punctuation de la langue Francoyse, plus des accents d'ycelle (1540), uses the circumflex (this time as a punctuation mark written between two letters) to show three metaplasms:

1. Syncope, or the disappearance of an interior syllable, shown by Dolet as: laiˆrra, paiˆra, uraiˆment (vraiˆment), donˆra for laiſſera (laissera), paiera, uraiemẽt (vraiment), donnera. Before the 14th century, the so-called "mute e" was always pronounced in French as a schwa (/ə/), regardless of position. For example, paiera was pronounced [pɛəra] instead of the modern [pɛra]. In the 14th century, however, this unaccented e began to disappear in hiatus and lose its phonemic status, although it remained in orthography. Some of the syncopes Dolet cites, however, had the mute e reintroduced later: his laiˆrra /lɛra/ is now /lɛsəra/ or /lɛsra/, and donˆra /dɔ̃ra/ is today /dɔnəra/ or /dɔnra/.
2. Haplology (the reduction of sequences of identical or similar phonemes): Dolet cites forms which no longer exist: auˆous (avˆous), nˆauous (nˆavous) for auez uous (avez-vous) and n'auez uous (n'avez-vous).
3. Contraction of an é followed by a mute e in the feminine plural (pronounced as two syllables in poetry), realized as a long close mid-vowel /eː/. It is important to remember that mute "e" at the end of a word was pronounced as a schwa until the 17th century. Thus penseˆes [pɑ̃seː], ſuborneˆes (suborneˆes) for pensées [pɑ̃seə], subornées. Dolet specifies that the acute accent should be written in noting the contraction. This contraction of two like vowels into one long vowel is also seen in other words, such as aˆage [aːʒə] for aage [aaʒə] (âge).

Thus Dolet uses the circumflex to indicate lost or silent phonemes, one of the uses for which the diacritic is still used today. Although not all his suggested usages were adopted, his work has allowed insight into the historical phonetics of French. Dolet summarized his own contributions with these words: "Ce ſont les preceptions" [préceptes], "que tu garderas quant aux accents de la langue Francoyse. Leſquels auſsi obſerueront tous diligents Imprimeurs : car telles choſes enrichiſſent fort l'impreſsion, & demõſtrent" [démontrent], "que ne faiſons rien par ignorance." Translation: "It is these precepts that you should follow concerning the accents of the French language. All diligent printers should also observe these rules, because such things greatly enrich printing and demonstrate that nothing is left to chance."

== Indication of a lost phoneme ==
In many cases, the circumflex indicates the historical presence of a phoneme which over the course of linguistic evolution became silent, and then disappeared altogether from the orthography.

=== Disappearance of "s" ===
The most common phenomenon involving the circumflex relates to /s/ before a consonant. Around the time of the Battle of Hastings in 1066, such post-vocalic /s/ sounds had begun to disappear before hard consonants in many words in Parisian French, being replaced by a compensatory elongation of the preceding vowel, which was maintained into the 18th century. This Parisian trend later spread outward and became the basis of Standard French, especially as Paris gained political and cultural dominance from the late Middle Ages onward.

The silent /s/ remained orthographically for some time, and various attempts were made to distinguish the historical presence graphically, but without much success. Notably, 17th century playwright Pierre Corneille, in printed editions of his plays, used the "long s" (ſ) to indicate silent "s" and the traditional form for the /s/ sound when pronounced (tempeſte, haſte, teſte vs. peste, funeste, chaste).

The circumflex was officially introduced into the 1740 edition of the dictionary of the Académie Française. In more recently introduced neologisms, however, the French lexicon was enriched with Latin-based words which retained their /s/ both in pronunciation and orthography, although the historically evolved word may have let the /s/ drop in favor of a circumflex. Thus, many learned words, or words added to the French vocabulary since then often keep both the pronunciation and the presence of the /s/ from Latin. For example:

- feste (first appearing in 1080) → fête, but:
  - festin: borrowed in the 16th century from the Italian festino,
  - festivité: borrowed from the Latin festivitas in the 19th century, and
  - festival: borrowed from the English festival in the 19th century have all retained their /s/, both written and pronounced. Likewise the related pairs tête/test, fenêtre/défenestrer, bête/bestiaire, etc.

More examples of a disappearing "s" that has been marked with an accent circumflex can be seen in the words below:

- ancêtre "ancestor"
- hôpital "hospital"
- hôtel "hostel"
- forêt "forest"
- coût "cost"
- rôtir "to roast"
- tâche "task"
- côte "coast"
- pâté "paste"
- août "August"
- château "castle"
- dégoûtant "disgusting"
- fantôme "ghost, phantom" (from Latin phantasma) (Note: The circumflex may come from the ancient s, or perhaps from the au of the older form fantauma, Trésor de la langue française informatisé, s.v.)
- île "isle"
- conquête "conquest"
- tempête "tempest"
- bâtard "bastard"
- bête "beast"
- Pâques "Pascha" (old name for Easter, from Latin pasca)
- Pentecôte "Pentecost"

Here are some instances where French has lost an "s" but other Romance languages have not:

- être "to be" (cf. Spanish estar)
- connaître "to know" (cf. Italian conoscere)
- tempête "storm" (cf. Italian tempesta)
- tête "head" (cf. Italian testa)
- goût "taste" (cf. Romanian gust)
- naître "to be born" (cf. Portuguese nascer)

=== Disappearance of other letters ===
The circumflex also serves as a vestige of other lost letters, particularly letters in hiatus where two vowels have contracted into one phoneme, such as aage → âge; baailler → bâiller, etc.

Likewise, the former medieval diphthong "eu" when pronounced /y/ would often, in the 18th century, take a circumflex to distinguish homophones, such as deu → dû (from devoir vs. du = de + le); creu → crû (from croître vs. cru from croire); seur → sûr (the adjective vs. the preposition sur), etc.

- cruement → crûment;
- meur → mûr.

== Indication of Greek omega ==
In words derived from Ancient Greek, the circumflex over o often indicates the presence of the Greek letter omega (ω) when the word is pronounced with the sound /o/: diplôme (δίπλωμα), cône (κῶνος). Where Greek omega does not correspond to /o/ in French, the circumflex is not used: comédie /kɔmedi/ (κωμῳδία).

This rule is sporadic, because many such words are written without the circumflex; for instance, axiome and zone have unaccented vowels despite their etymology (Greek ἀξίωμα and ζώνη) and pronunciation (/aksjom/, /zon/). On the other hand, many learned words ending in -ole, -ome, and -one (but not tracing back to a Greek omega) acquired a circumflex accent and the closed /o/ pronunciation by analogy with words like cône and diplôme: trône (θρόνος), pôle (πόλος), binôme (from Latin binomium).

The circumflex accent was also used to indicate French vowels deriving from Greek eta (η), but this practice has not always survived in modern orthography. For example, the spelling théorême (θεώρημα) was later replaced by théorème, while the Greek letter is still spelled bêta.

== Analogical and idiopathic cases ==
Some circumflexes appear for no known reason. It is thought to give words an air of prestige, like a crown (thus suprême and voûte).

Linguistic interference sometimes accounts for the presence of a circumflex. This is the case in the first person plural of the preterite indicative (or passé simple), which adds a circumflex by association with the second person plural, thus:

- Latin cantāvistis → cantāstis → OF chantastes → chantâtes (after the muting of the interposing /s/)
- Latin cantāvimus → cantāmus → OF chantames → chantâmes (by interference with chantâtes).

All instances of the first and second persons plural of the preterite take the circumflex in the conjugation ending except the verb haïr, due to its necessary dieresis (nous haïmes, vous haïtes).

== Vowel length and quality ==
In general, vowels bearing the circumflex accent were historically long (for example, through compensatory lengthening associated with the consonant loss described above). Vowel length is no longer distinctive in most varieties of modern French, but some of the older length distinctions now correspond to differences in vowel quality, and the circumflex can be used to indicate these differences orthographically.

- â → /ɑ/ ("velar" or back a) — pâte vs. patte, tâche vs. tache
- ê → /ɛ/ (open e; equivalent of è or e followed by two consonants) — prêt vs. pré
- ô → /o/ (equivalent to au or o at the end of a syllable) — hôte vs. hotte, côte vs. cote

The circumflex does not affect the pronunciation of the letters "i" or "u" (except in the combination "eû": jeûne [ʒøn] vs. jeune [ʒœn]).

The diacritic disappears in related words if the pronunciation changes (particularly when the vowel in question is no longer in the stressed final syllable). For example:

- infâme /ɛ̃fɑm/, but infamie /ɛ̃fami/,
- grâce /ɡʁɑs/, but gracieux /ɡʁasjø/,
- fantôme /fɑ̃tom/, but fantomatique /fɑ̃tɔmatik/.

In other cases, the presence or absence of the circumflex in derived words is not correlated with pronunciation, for example with the vowel "u":

- fût [fy] vs. futaille [fytaj]
- bûche [byʃ] vs. bûchette [byʃɛt]
- sûr [syʁ] and sûrement [syʁmɑ̃], but assurer [asyʁe].

There are nonetheless notable exceptions to the pronunciation rules given here. For instance, in non-final syllables, "ê" can be realized as a closed /e/ as a result of vowel harmony: compare bête /bɛt/ and bêta /bɛta/ with bêtise /betiz/ and abêtir [abetiʁ], or tête /tɛt/ and têtard /tɛtaʁ/ vs. têtu /tety/.

In varieties of French where open/closed syllable adjustment (loi de position) applies, the presence of a circumflex accent is not taken into account in the mid vowel alternations /e/~/ɛ/ and /o/~/ɔ/. This is the case in southern Metropolitan French, where for example dôme is pronounced /dɔm/ as opposed to /dom/ (as indicated by the orthography, and as pronounced in northern Metropolitan varieties).

The merger of /ɑ/ and /a/ is widespread in Parisian and Belgian French, resulting for example in the realization of the word âme as /am/ instead of /ɑm/.

== Distinguishing homographs ==
Although normally the grave accent serves the purpose of differentiating homographs in French (là ~ la, où ~ ou, çà ~ ça, à ~ a, etc.), the circumflex, for historical reasons, has come to serve a similar role. In fact, almost all the cases where the circumflex is used to distinguish homographs can be explained by the reasons above: it would therefore be false to declare that it is in certain words a sign placed solely to distinguish homographs, as with the grave accent. However, it does allow one to remove certain ambiguities. For example, in words that underwent the change of "eu" to "û", the circumflex avoids possible homography with other words containing "u":

- sur ~ sûr(e)(s) (from seür → sëur): The homography with the preposition sur, "on" and the adjective sur(e), "sour", justifies maintaining the accent in the feminine and plural. The accent is also maintained in derived words such as sûreté.
- du ~ dû (from deü): As the homography disappears in the inflected forms of the past participle, we have dû but dus / due(s).
- mur ~ mûr(e)(s) (from meür): The accent is maintained in all forms as well as in derived words (mûrir, mûrissement).

== Orthographic reform ==
Francophone experts, aware of the difficulties and inconsistencies of the circumflex, proposed in 1990 a simplified orthography abolishing the circumflex over the letters u and i except in cases where its absence would create ambiguities and homographs. These recommendations, although published in the Journal officiel de la République française, were immediately and widely criticized, and were adopted only slowly. Nevertheless, they were upheld by the Académie française, which upgraded them from optional to standard and for use in schoolbooks in 2016.

== See also ==
- Diacritic
- Latin alphabet
- Reforms of French orthography

== Bibliography ==
- Nina Catach, ed. (1995). Dictionnaire historique de l'orthographe française. Paris: Larousse.
- Casagrande, Jean (1984). The Sound System of French. Washington, DC: Georgetown University Press. ISBN 0-87840-085-0.
- Cerquiglini, Bernard (1995). L'Accent du souvenir. Paris: Éditions de Minuit. ISBN 2-7073-1536-2.
- Fagyal, Zsuzsanna; Douglas Kibbee; Fred Jenkins (2006). French: A Linguistic Introduction. Cambridge: Cambridge University Press. ISBN 0-521-52896-8.
- Hausmann, Franz Josef (1980). Louis Meigret, humaniste et linguiste. Tübingen: Gunter Narr. ISBN 3-87808-406-4.
- Tranel, Bernard (1987). The Sounds of French: An Introduction. Cambridge, New York: Cambridge University Press. ISBN 0-521-31510-7.
