= Tapirira bethanniana =

Conservation status
- Vulnerable (IUCN 2.3)

Scientific classification
- Kingdom: Plantae
- Clade: Tracheophytes
- Clade: Angiosperms
- Clade: Eudicots
- Clade: Rosids
- Order: Sapindales
- Family: Anacardiaceae
- Genus: Tapirira
- Species: T. bethanniana

Binomial name
- Tapirira bethanniana J.D.Mitch.

Species of tree

Tapirira bethanniana is a tall tree of the family Anacardiaceae. It is endemic to tropical rainforests of French Guiana.
