= Lycée Guillaume Apollinaire (Thiais) =

Senior high school in France

Lycée Guillaume Apollinaire is a senior high school in Thiais, Val-de-Marne, France, in the Paris metropolitan area.

As of 2016 the school has 1,150 general students and 250 baccalaureat students.
