= Thiais =

- Commune
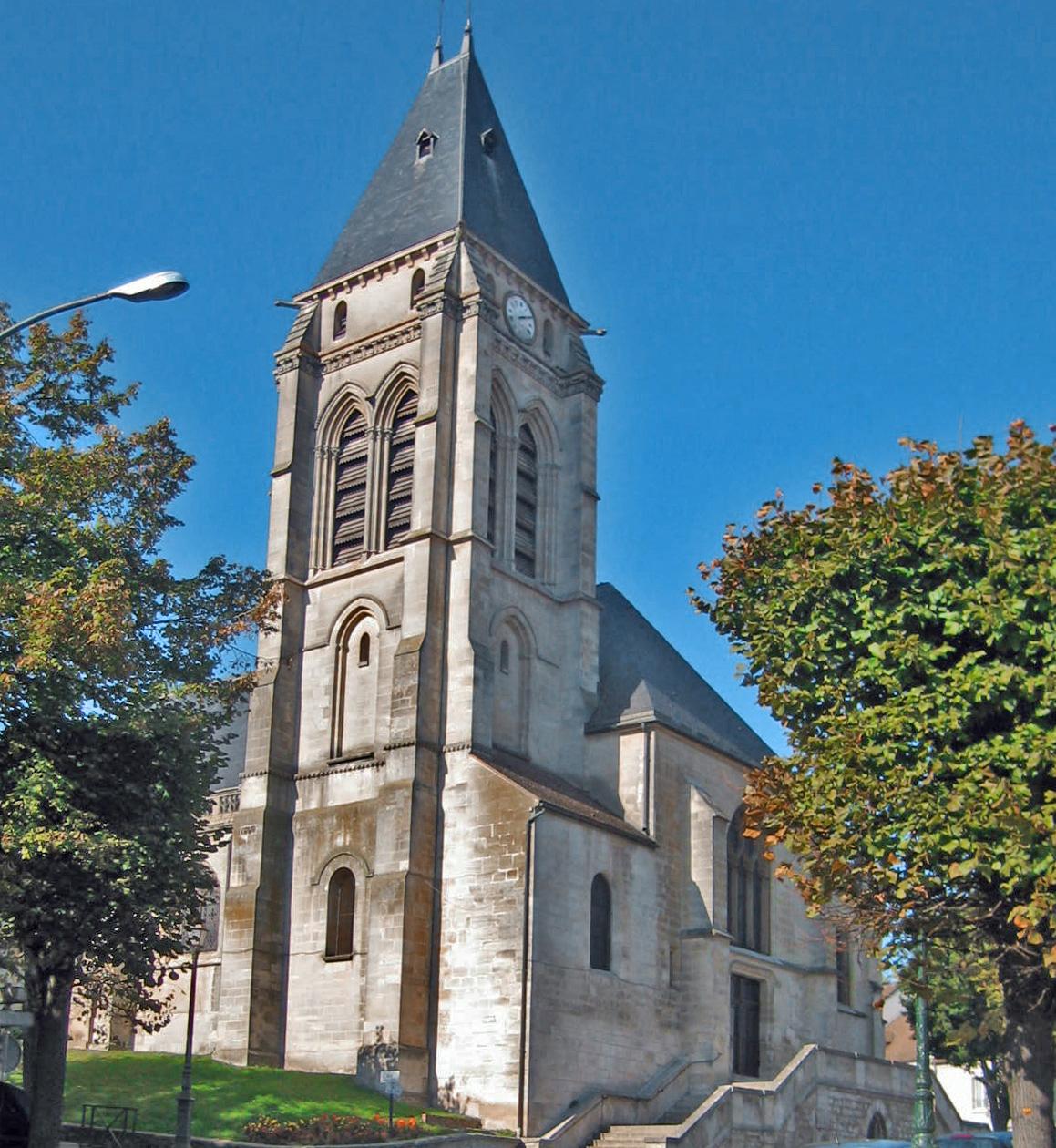
- The church Saint-Leu

- Coat of arms

- Location (in red) within Paris inner suburbs
- Location of Thiais
- Location within France Location within Île-de-France (region)
- Coordinates: 48°45′54″N 2°23′32″E
- Country: France
- Region: Île-de-France
- Department: Val-de-Marne
- Arrondissement: L'Haÿ-les-Roses
- Canton: Thiais
- Intercommunality: Grand Paris

Government
  - Mayor (2026–32): Richard Dell'Agnola
- Area^{1}: 6.43 km^{2} (2.48 sq mi)
- Population (2023): 32,918
  - Density: 5,120/km^{2} (13,300/sq mi)
- Time zone: UTC+01:00 (CET)
  - Summer (DST): UTC+02:00 (CEST)
- INSEE/Postal code: 94073 /
- ^{1} French Land Register data, which excludes lakes, ponds, glaciers > 1 km^{2} (0.386 sq mi or 247 acres) and river estuaries.

Thiais (French pronunciation: [tjɛ]) is a commune in the southern suburbs of Paris, France. It is located 10.3 km (6.4 mi) from the center of Paris.

The name Thiais comes from Medieval Latin Theodasium or Theodaxium, meaning "estate of Theodasius", a Gallo-Roman landowner.

Thiais is best known for its cemetery, the second largest in the Paris area.

== History ==
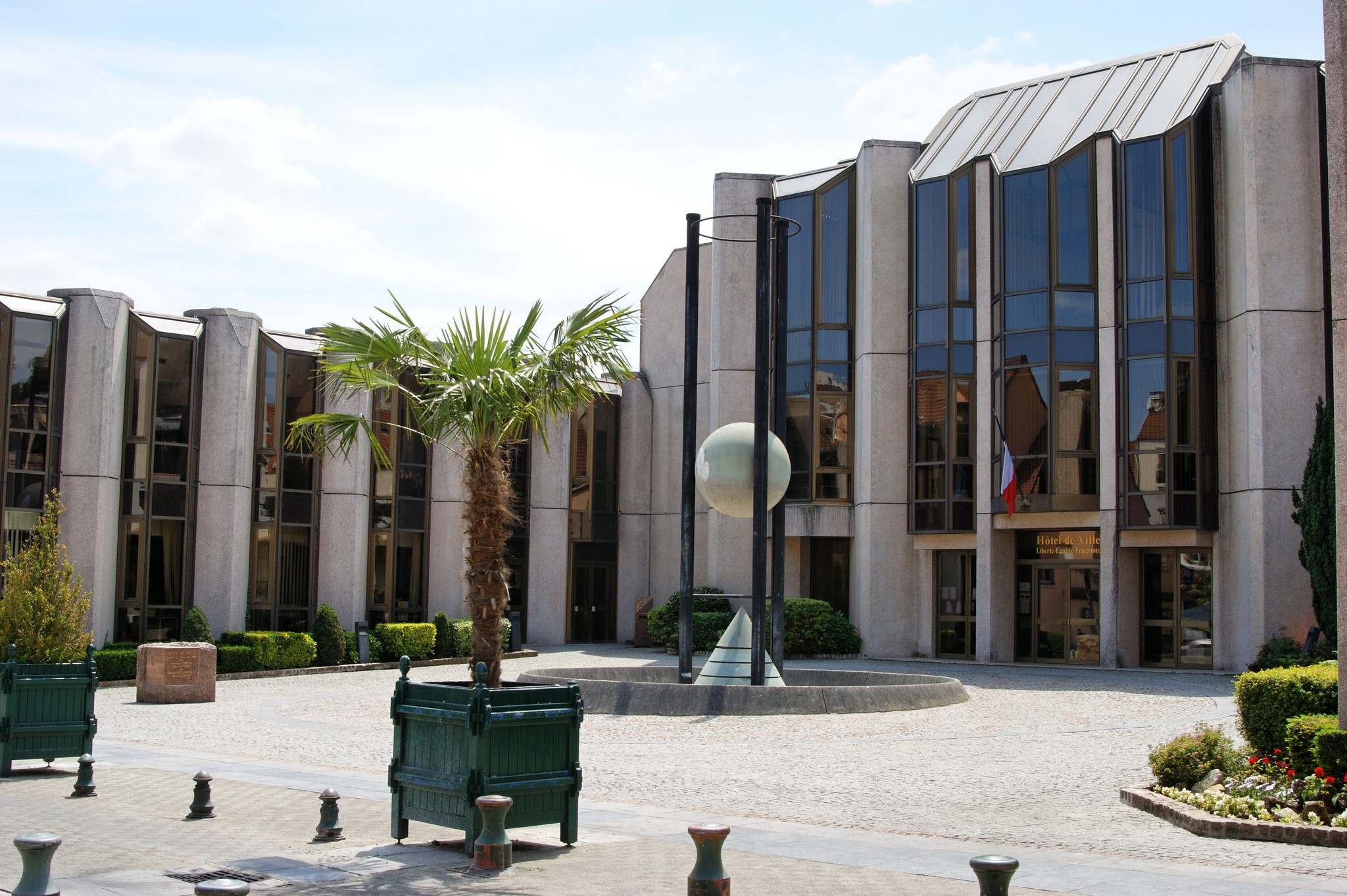
The Hôtel de Ville

The Austrian writer Joseph Roth, exiled due to his opposition to the Nazi regime, lived at Thiais at the end of the 1930s and is buried at the local cemetery. The tomb of Russian writer Yevgeny Zamyatin is also there. Expatriate American journalist and novelist William Gardner Smith died there in 1974.

The Hôtel de Ville was completed in December 1984.

== Population ==
Historical population

Year	Pop.	±% p.a.
1793	1,028	—
1800	653	−6.28%
1806	760	+2.56%
1821	620	−1.35%
1831	1,032	+5.23%
1836	1,086	+1.03%
1841	1,172	+1.54%
1846	1,140	−0.55%
1851	1,099	−0.73%
1856	1,155	+1.00%
1861	1,268	+1.88%
1866	1,462	+2.89%
1872	1,364	−1.15%
1876	1,760	+6.58%
1881	2,120	+3.79%
1886	2,591	+4.09%
1891	2,616	+0.19%
1896	2,771	+1.16%
1901	3,018	+1.72%

Year	Pop.	±% p.a.
1906	3,477	+2.87%
1911	4,036	+3.03%
1921	4,469	+1.02%
1926	5,787	+5.30%
1931	7,034	+3.98%
1936	8,246	+3.23%
1946	8,350	+0.13%
1954	10,026	+2.31%
1962	15,116	+5.27%
1968	22,481	+6.84%
1975	27,298	+2.81%
1982	26,637	−0.35%
1990	27,515	+0.41%
1999	28,232	+0.29%
2007	29,273	+0.45%
2012	29,422	+0.10%
2017	29,017	−0.28%
2023	32,918	+2.12%

Source: EHESS and INSEE (1968-2023)

== Transport ==
Thiais is served by Pont de Rungis–Aéroport d'Orly station on Paris RER line C. It is also served by Choisy-le-Roi station on Paris RER line C. This station, although administratively located on the territory of Choisy-le-Roi, lies closer to the town center of Thiais than Pont de Rungis – Aéroport d'Orly station does, and is thus used by people in Thiais.

== Education ==
The commune has:

- Seven preschools (écoles maternelles): Jeanne d'Arc, Romain Gary, Charles Péguy, Jacques Prévert, Saint Exupéry, Robert Schuman, and des Tilleuls
- Six elementary schools: Charles Péguy, Romain Gary, Camille Claudel, Paul Éluard, Saint-Exupéry, and Robert Schuman
- Three junior high schools: Collège Albert Camus, Collège Paul Valéry, and Collège Paul Klee
- Lycée Guillaume Apollinaire, a senior high school/sixth-form college

== Monuments ==
- Paul Celan's grave.
- Farhad Mehrad's grave. Farhad was cremated and is buried in the Thiais.
- Yevgeny Zamyatin's grave.

== See also ==
- Communes of the Val-de-Marne department
