= Nestor Léon Marchand =

French physician, pharmacist and botanist

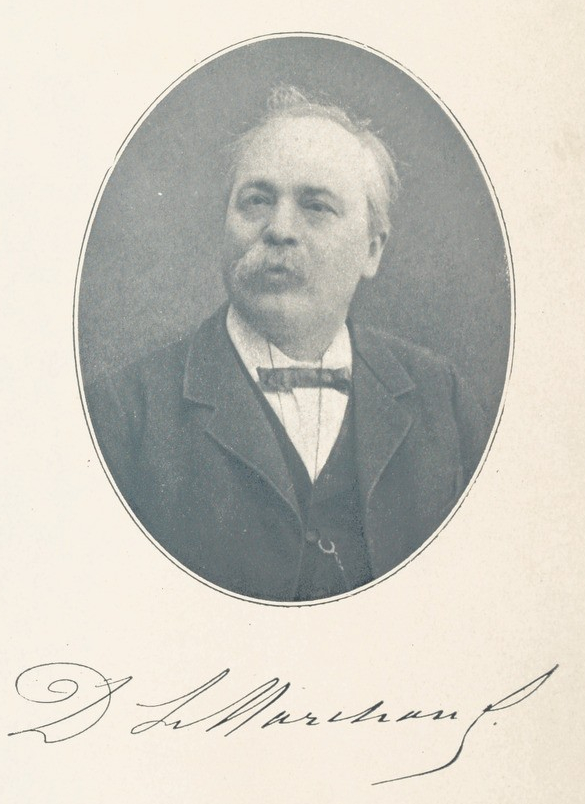
The portrait of Nestor Léon Marchand

Nestor Léon Marchand (15 April 1833 – 16 April 1911) was a French medical doctor, pharmacist, and botanist. He is known for his studies of the flowering plant family Anacardiaceae.

He studied in Tours and Paris, subsequently earning a bachelor of science degree (1860), a doctorate in medicine (1861), a first-class license in pharmacy (1864) and a doctorate in natural sciences (1867). He later became a professor of botanical cryptogamy at the École supérieure de pharmacie in Paris. He was mayor of Thiais, France from 1881 to 1887.

== Selected publications ==
- Du Croton tiglium : recherches botaniques et thérapeutiques, 1861 - Croton tiglium: botanical and therapeutic research.
- Recherches organographiques et organogéniques sur le Coffea arabica L., 1864 - Organographic and organogenic research of Coffea arabica.
- Recherches sur l'organisation des burséracées, 1868 - Research on the organization of Burseraceae
- Histoire de l'ancien groupe des térébin-thacées, 1869 - History of the former group Terebinthaceae. Digital edition by the University and State Library Düsseldorf
- Enumération des Substances fournies a la Médecine et a la Pharmacie par l'ancien Groupe des Térébinthacées . LaHure, Paris 1869 Digital edition by the University and State Library Düsseldorf
- Botanique cryptogamique pharmaco-médicale: Programme raisonné d'un cours professé à l'Ecole supérieure de pharmacie de Paris, 1880.
- Révision du groupe des Anacardiacées - Revision involving the group Anacardiaceae.
- Synopsis et tableau synoptique des familles qui composent la classe des mycophytes (Champignons et Lichens), 1894 - Synopsis with a synoptic table of families that make up the class of mycophytes (mushrooms and lichens).
