= List of gymnasts at the 1992 Summer Olympics =

This is a list of the gymnasts who represented their country at the 1992 Summer Olympics in Barcelona from 25 July to 9 August 1992. Gymnasts across two disciplines (artistic gymnastics and rhythmic gymnastics) participated in the Games.

== Female artistic gymnasts ==
	Name	Country	Date of birth (Age)
Youngest competitor	Sonia Fraguas	Spain	20 November 1977 (aged 14)
Oldest competitor	Giulia Volpi	Italy	30 January 1970 (aged 22)

NOC	Name	Date of birth (Age)	Hometown
Argentina	Andrea Giordano	17 July 1976 (aged 16)	
Argentina	Romina Plataroti	9 March 1977 (aged 15)	Buenos Aires, Argentina
Australia	Monique Allen	10 November 1971 (aged 20)	New South Wales, Australia
Australia	Brooke Gysen	19 September 1977 (aged 14)	Victoria, Australia
Australia	Julie-Anne Monico	16 March 1976 (aged 16)	Victoria, Australia
Australia	Lisa Read	26 August 1973 (aged 18)	Australian Capital Territory
Australia	Kylie Shadbolt	8 November 1972 (aged 19)	Victoria, Australia
Australia	Jane Warrilow	27 July 1973 (aged 18)	Perth, Western Australia
Belgium	Bénédicte Evrard	21 March 1975 (aged 17)	Brussels, Belgium
Brazil	Luísa Parente	1 February 1973 (aged 19)	Rio de Janeiro, Brazil
Bulgaria	Snezhana Hristakieva	11 March 1977 (aged 15)	Plovdiv, Bulgaria
Bulgaria	Tanya Maslarska	15 August 1975 (aged 16)	Sofia, Bulgaria
Bulgaria	Silvia Mitova	29 June 1976 (aged 16)	Sofia, Bulgaria
Bulgaria	Hristina Panayotova	27 August 1975 (aged 16)	Sofia, Bulgaria
Bulgaria	Svetlana Todorova	19 October 1974 (aged 17)	Haskovo, Bulgaria
Bulgaria	Deliana Vodenicharova	19 October 1973 (aged 18)	Ruse, Bulgaria
Canada	Mylène Fleury	12 January 1975 (aged 17)	Montreal, Quebec
Canada	Janet Morin	25 September 1975 (aged 16)	Fredericton, New Brunswick
Canada	Janine Rankin	3 June 1972 (aged 20)	Weston, Ontario
Canada	Lori Strong	12 September 1972 (aged 19)	Scarborough, Ontario
Canada	Stella Umeh	27 May 1975 (aged 17)	Toronto, Ontario
Canada	Jennifer Wood	4 August 1972 (aged 19)	Edmonton, Alberta
China	He Xuemei	6 February 1977 (aged 15)	Lijiang, Yunnan
China	Li Li	26 February 1975 (aged 17)	Xingning, Guangdong
China	Li Yifang	1 February 1975 (aged 17)	Zhangzhou, Fujian
China	Lu Li	30 August 1976 (aged 15)	Changsha, Hunan
China	Yang Bo	8 July 1973 (aged 19)	Ningbo, Zhejiang
China	Zhang Xia	21 June 1975 (aged 17)	Xintai, Shandong
Czechoslovakia	Daniela Bártová	6 May 1974 (aged 18)	Ostrava, Czechoslovakia
Czechoslovakia	Pavla Kinclová	19 February 1975 (aged 17)	Zlín, Czechoslovakia
Czechoslovakia	Iveta Poloková	17 August 1970 (aged 21)	Frýdek-Místek, Czechoslovakia
France	Karine Boucher	28 July 1972 (aged 19)	Orléans, France
France	Karine Charlier	22 April 1977 (aged 15)	Créteil, France
France	Marie-Angéline Colson	21 May 1976 (aged 16)	Clermont-Ferrand, France
France	Virginie Machado	1 June 1976 (aged 16)	Hénin-Beaumont, France
France	Chloé Maigre	24 December 1974 (aged 17)	Niamey, Niger
France	Jenny Rolland	7 January 1975 (aged 17)	Marseille, France
Germany	Jana Günther	21 May 1975 (aged 17)	Rostock, Germany
Germany	Annette Potempa	18 September 1976 (aged 15)	Chorzów, Poland
Germany	Anke Schönfelder	2 October 1975 (aged 16)	Berlin, Germany
Germany	Diana Schröder	18 April 1975 (aged 17)	Mühlhausen, Germany
Germany	Kathleen Stark	9 September 1975 (aged 16)	Rostock, Germany
Germany	Gabriele Weller	2 February 1976 (aged 16)	Gießen, Germany
Great Britain	Sarah Mercer	30 December 1974 (aged 17)	Durban, South Africa
Great Britain	Rowena Roberts	14 May 1977 (aged 15)	Kingston upon Thames, England
Guatemala	Luísa Portocarrero	27 October 1976 (aged 15)	Guatemala City, Guatemala
Hungary	Bernadett Balázs	19 April 1975 (aged 17)	Budapest, Hungary
Hungary	Ildikó Balog	7 November 1977 (aged 14)	Békéscsaba, Hungary
Hungary	Kinga Horváth	13 November 1976 (aged 15)	Budapest, Hungary
Hungary	Andrea Molnár	3 March 1975 (aged 17)	Budapest, Hungary
Hungary	Krisztina Molnár	8 April 1976 (aged 16)	Budapest, Hungary
Hungary	Henrietta Ónodi	22 May 1974 (aged 18)	Békéscsaba, Hungary
Italy	Veronica Servente	9 March 1977 (aged 15)	Turin, Italy
Italy	Giulia Volpi	30 January 1970 (aged 22)	Brescia, Italy
Japan	Mari Kosuge	16 October 1975 (aged 16)	Kodaira, Japan
Japan	Hanako Miura	28 March 1975 (aged 17)	Hiroshima Prefecture, Japan
Japan	Kyoko Seo	28 June 1972 (aged 20)	Yamagata Prefecture, Japan
Mexico	Denisse López	8 December 1976 (aged 15)	Mexicali, Baja California
Netherlands	Elvira Becks	8 May 1976 (aged 16)	Nijmegen, Netherlands
North Korea	An Myong-hwa	13 November 1974 (aged 17)	
North Korea	Choi Gyong-hui	23 May 1973 (aged 19)	
North Korea	Hwang Bo-sil	6 November 1972 (aged 19)	
North Korea	Kim Gwang-suk	15 February (year unknown)*	
North Korea	Li Chun-mi	3 November 1976 (aged 15)	
North Korea	Pak Gyong-sil	3 June 1975 (aged 17)	
Norway	Anita Tomulevski	15 March 1977 (aged 15)	Oslo, Norway
Romania	Cristina Bontaș	5 December 1973 (aged 18)	Ștefan cel Mare, Romania
Romania	Gina Gogean	9 September 1977 (aged 14)	Câmpuri, Romania
Romania	Vanda Hădărean	3 May 1976 (aged 16)	Cluj-Napoca, Romania
Romania	Lavinia Miloșovici	21 October 1976 (aged 15)	Lugoj, Romania
Romania	Maria Neculiță	30 March 1974 (aged 18)	Deva, Romania
Romania	Mirela Pașca	19 February 1975 (aged 17)	Baia Mare, Romania
South Korea	Lee Hee-kyung	29 April 1975 (aged 17)	
South Korea	Min A-yeong	28 January 1975 (aged 17)	
Spain	Alicia Fernández	25 November 1973 (aged 18)	Madrid, Spain
Spain	Cristina Fraguas	8 July 1976 (aged 16)	Madrid, Spain
Spain	Sonia Fraguas	20 November 1977 (aged 14)	Madrid, Spain
Spain	Silvia Martínez	22 September 1974 (aged 17)	Madrid, Spain
Spain	Ruth Rollán	14 May 1977 (aged 15)	Madrid, Spain
Spain	Eva Rueda	13 September 1971 (aged 20)	Madrid, Spain
Unified Team	Svetlana Boginskaya	9 February 1973 (aged 19)	Minsk, Byelorussian SSR
Unified Team	Oksana Chusovitina	19 June 1975 (aged 17)	Bukhara, Uzbek SSR
Unified Team	Roza Galiyeva	28 April 1977 (aged 15)	Olmaliq, Uzbek SSR
Unified Team	Elena Grudneva	21 February 1974 (aged 18)	Kemerovo, Russian SFSR
Unified Team	Tatiana Gutsu	5 September 1976 (aged 15)	Odessa, Ukrainian SSR
Unified Team	Tatiana Lysenko	23 June 1975 (aged 17)	Kherson, Ukrainian SSR
United States	Wendy Bruce	23 March 1973 (aged 19)	Plainview, Texas
United States	Dominique Dawes	20 November 1976 (aged 15)	Silver Spring, Maryland
United States	Shannon Miller	10 March 1977 (aged 15)	Rolla, Missouri
United States	Betty Okino	4 June 1975 (aged 17)	Entebbe, Uganda
United States	Kerri Strug	19 November 1977 (aged 14)	Tucson, Arizona
United States	Kim Zmeskal	6 February 1976 (aged 16)	Houston, Texas

* North Korea was accused of falsifying Kim Gwang-suk's age, and her true year of birth has never been conclusively determined.

== Male artistic gymnasts ==
	Name	Country	Date of birth (Age)
Youngest competitor	Georgi Lozanov	Bulgaria	3 March 1974 (aged 18)
Oldest competitor	Marvin Campbell	United Kingdom	14 July 1961 (aged 31)

NOC	Name	Date of birth (Age)	Hometown
Argentina	Isidro Ibarrondo	21 December 1970 (aged 21)	
Australia	Brennon Dowrick	27 July 1971 (aged 20)	Wagga Wagga, New South Wales
Brazil	Marco Monteiro	23 July 1966 (aged 26)	Rio de Janeiro, Brazil
Bulgaria	Ilian Aleksandrov	1 January 1972 (aged 20)	Pernik, Bulgaria
Bulgaria	Krasimir Dunev	11 September 1972 (aged 19)	Plovdiv, Bulgaria
Bulgaria	Kalofer Hristozov	19 March 1969 (aged 23)	Plovdiv, Bulgaria
Bulgaria	Deyan Kolev	18 December 1965 (aged 26)	Targovishte, Bulgaria
Bulgaria	Georgi Lozanov	3 March 1974 (aged 18)	Sofia, Bulgaria
Bulgaria	Yordan Yovchev	24 February 1973 (aged 19)	Plovdiv, Bulgaria
Canada	Curtis Hibbert	2 September 1966 (aged 25)	Kingston, Jamaica
Canada	Mike Inglis	30 October 1966 (aged 25)	Cobourg, Ontario
Canada	Alan Nolet	17 December 1967 (aged 24)	Toronto, Ontario
China	Guo Linyao	10 March 1972 (aged 20)	Harbin, Heilongjiang
China	Li Chunyang	2 February 1968 (aged 24)	Shantou, Guangdong
China	Li Dashuang	1 November 1973 (aged 18)	Xiantao, Hubei
China	Li Ge	12 April 1969 (aged 23)	
China	Li Jing	23 February 1970 (aged 22)	Hengyang, Hunan
China	Li Xiaoshuang	1 November 1973 (aged 18)	Xiantao, Hubei
Czechoslovakia	Arnold Bugár	2 September 1971 (aged 20)	Bratislava, Czechoslovakia
Czechoslovakia	Martin Modlitba	12 January 1970 (aged 22)	Banská Bystrica, Czechoslovakia
France	Patrice Casimir	4 July 1972 (aged 20)	Saint-Pierre, Réunion
France	Sébastien Darrigade	20 March 1972 (aged 20)	Saint-Mandé, France
France	Fabrice Guelzec	21 March 1968 (aged 24)	Nantes, France
Germany	Ralf Büchner	31 August 1967 (aged 24)	Berlin, Germany
Germany	Mario Franke	22 January 1968 (aged 24)	Sangerhausen, Germany
Germany	Sylvio Kroll	29 April 1965 (aged 27)	Lübben, Germany
Germany	Sven Tippelt	3 June 1965 (aged 27)	Leipzig, Germany
Germany	Oliver Walther	28 October 1972 (aged 19)	Halle, Germany
Germany	Andreas Wecker	2 January 1970 (aged 22)	Staßfurt, Germany
Great Britain	Terry Bartlett	2 December 1963 (aged 28)	Southampton, England
Great Britain	Paul Bowler	13 October 1967 (aged 24)	Manchester, England
Great Britain	Marvin Campbell	14 July 1961 (aged 31)	Manchester, England
Great Britain	David Cox	20 June 1970 (aged 22)	Johannesburg, South Africa
Great Britain	James May	30 January 1968 (aged 24)	Seaton, England
Great Britain	Neil Thomas	6 April 1968 (aged 24)	Chirk, Wales
Hungary	Szilveszter Csollány	13 April 1970 (aged 22)	Sopron, Hungary
Hungary	Róbert Élő	17 October 1969 (aged 22)	Győr, Hungary
Hungary	Csaba Fajkusz	13 September 1967 (aged 24)	Győr, Hungary
Hungary	Miklós Pánczél	4 February 1971 (aged 21)	Dunaújváros, Hungary
Hungary	Károly Schupkégel	4 July 1965 (aged 27)	Brașov, Romania
Hungary	Zoltán Supola	25 September 1970 (aged 21)	Dunaújváros, Hungary
Israel	Ron Kaplan	1 May 1970 (aged 22)	
Italy	Paolo Bucci	23 July 1968 (aged 24)	Milan, Italy
Italy	Gianmatteo Centazzo	4 February 1970 (aged 22)	Venice, Italy
Italy	Boris Preti	6 February 1968 (aged 24)	Gallarate, Italy
Italy	Ruggero Rossato	27 June 1968 (aged 24)	Padua, Italy
Italy	Gabriele Sala	27 September 1967 (aged 24)	Brescia, Italy
Italy	Alessandro Viligiardi	25 July 1967 (aged 25)	Rome, Italy
Japan	Yutaka Aihara	18 December 1970 (aged 21)	Gunma Prefecture, Japan
Japan	Takashi Chinen	25 March 1967 (aged 25)	Uruma, Japan
Japan	Yoshiaki Hatakeda	12 May 1972 (aged 20)	Tokushima Prefecture, Japan
Japan	Yukio Iketani	26 September 1970 (aged 21)	Tokyo, Japan
Japan	Masayuki Matsunaga	23 March 1970 (aged 22)	Osaka, Japan
Japan	Daisuke Nishikawa	2 June 1970 (aged 22)	Osaka, Japan
Mexico	Luis López	8 June 1969 (aged 23)	
North Korea	Cho Hun	24 September 1968 (aged 23)	
North Korea	Pae Gil-su	4 March 1972 (aged 20)	
North Korea	Sin Myong-su	9 December 1966 (aged 25)	
Puerto Rico	Víctor Colón	16 March 1972 (aged 20)	
Romania	Nicolae Bejenaru	30 May 1968 (aged 24)	Bucharest, Romania
Romania	Adrian Gal	6 September 1970 (aged 21)	
Romania	Marius Gherman	14 July 1967 (aged 25)	Sibiu, Romania
Romania	Marian Rizan	29 October 1966 (aged 25)	Craiova, Romania
Romania	Adrian Sandu	19 October 1966 (aged 25)	Sibiu, Romania
Romania	Nicu Stroia	20 October 1971 (aged 20)	Pângărați, Romania
Slovenia	Jože Kolman	5 February 1967 (aged 25)	Ljubljana, Slovenia
South Korea	Han Gwang-ho	1 July 1973 (aged 19)	
South Korea	Han Yun-su	8 February 1973 (aged 19)	Suwon, South Korea
South Korea	Jeong Jin-su	15 August 1972 (aged 19)	
South Korea	Lee Joo-hyung	5 March 1973 (aged 19)	
South Korea	Yeo Hong-chul	28 May 1971 (aged 21)	Gwangju, South Korea
South Korea	Yoo Ok-ryul	1 March 1973 (aged 19)	
Spain	Alfonso Rodríguez	23 December 1965 (aged 26)	Madrid, Spain
Spain	Miguel Ángel Rubio	20 August 1966 (aged 25)	Barcelona, Spain
Sweden	Johan Jonasson	9 October 1966 (aged 25)	Stockholm, Sweden
Switzerland	Michael Engeler	18 June 1971 (aged 21)	St. Gallen, Switzerland
Switzerland	Daniel Giubellini	19 August 1969 (aged 22)	
Switzerland	Oliver Grimm	16 April 1969 (aged 23)	
Switzerland	Markus Müller	22 December 1966 (aged 25)	
Switzerland	Flavio Rota	20 July 1966 (aged 26)	
Switzerland	Erich Wanner	5 April 1969 (aged 23)	
Unified Team	Valery Belenky	5 September 1969 (aged 22)	Baku, Azerbaijan SSR
Unified Team	Ihor Korobchynskyi	16 August 1969 (aged 22)	Antratsyt, Ukrainian SSR
Unified Team	Grigory Misyutin	29 December 1970 (aged 21)	Oleksandriya, Ukrainian SSR
Unified Team	Vitaly Scherbo	13 January 1972 (aged 20)	Minsk, Byelorussian SSR
Unified Team	Rustam Sharipov	2 June 1971 (aged 21)	Dushanbe, Tajik SSR
Unified Team	Aleksey Voropayev	23 January 1973 (aged 19)	Moscow, Russian SFSR
United States	Trent Dimas	10 November 1970 (aged 21)	Albuquerque, New Mexico
United States	Scott Keswick	3 March 1970 (aged 22)	Washington, D.C.
United States	Jair Lynch	2 October 1971 (aged 20)	Amherst, Massachusetts
United States	Dominick Minicucci	10 January 1969 (aged 23)	Staten Island, New York
United States	John Roethlisberger	21 June 1970 (aged 22)	Fort Atkinson, Wisconsin
United States	Chris Waller	20 September 1968 (aged 23)	Evanston, Illinois

== Rhythmic gymnasts ==
	Name	Country	Date of birth (Age)
Youngest competitor	Céline Degrange	France	29 December 1978 (aged 13)
Oldest competitor	Susan Cushman	Canada	7 January 1972 (aged 20)

NOC	Name	Date of birth (Age)	Hometown
Belgium	Cindy Stollenberg	22 July 1976 (aged 16)	Verviers, Belgium
Brazil	Marta Cristina Schonhurst	11 November 1974 (aged 17)	Passo Fundo, Brazil
Bulgaria	Maria Petrova	13 November 1975 (aged 16)	Plovdiv, Bulgaria
Bulgaria	Diana Popova	10 December 1976 (aged 15)	Plovdiv, Bulgaria
Canada	Susan Cushman	7 January 1972 (aged 20)	Cold Lake, Alberta
Canada	Madonna Gimotea	6 October 1974 (aged 17)	North York, Ontario
China	Bai Mei	8 January 1975 (aged 17)	
China	Guo Shasha	22 April 1976 (aged 16)	Nanjing, Jiangsu
Cyprus	Elena Khatzisavva	17 August 1977 (aged 14)	
Cyprus	Anna Kimonos	15 December 1975 (aged 16)	
Czechoslovakia	Lenka Oulehlová	14 June 1973 (aged 19)	Brno, Czechoslovakia
Czechoslovakia	Jana Šramková	3 January 1976 (aged 16)	Brno, Czechoslovakia
Finland	Hanna Laiho	13 December 1975 (aged 16)	Lahti, Finland
France	Céline Degrange	29 December 1978 (aged 13)	Moulins, France
France	Chrystelle-Arlette Sahuc	9 February 1975 (aged 17)	Alès, France
Germany	Christiane Klumpp	22 November 1976 (aged 15)	Freudenstadt, Germany
Great Britain	Viva Seifert	15 April 1972 (aged 20)	London, England
Great Britain	Debbie Southwick	11 May 1976 (aged 16)	Liverpool, England
Greece	Maria Sansaridou	31 March 1977 (aged 15)	Thessaloniki, Greece
Greece	Areti Sinapidou	27 October 1976 (aged 15)	Thessaloniki, Greece
Hungary	Viktória Fráter	30 August 1977 (aged 14)	Budapest, Hungary
Hungary	Andrea Szalay	20 May 1976 (aged 16)	Budapest, Hungary
Independent Olympic Participants	Majda Milak	26 March 1977 (aged 15)	
Independent Olympic Participants	Kristina Radonjić	22 October 1974 (aged 17)	Belgrade, Yugoslavia
Italy	Samantha Ferrari	25 September 1973 (aged 18)	Moggio, Italy
Italy	Irene Germini	24 July 1974 (aged 18)	Legnano, Italy
Japan	Yukari Kawamoto	13 June 1972 (aged 20)	Kiyose, Japan
Japan	Miho Yamada	21 June 1973 (aged 19)	Chofu, Japan
North Korea	Chong Gum	6 November 1976 (aged 15)	
North Korea	Li Gyong-hui	10 July 1972 (aged 20)	Pyongyang, North Korea
Poland	Eliza Białkowska	19 July 1973 (aged 19)	Skwierzyna, Poland
Poland	Joanna Bodak	2 January 1974 (aged 18)	Grybów, Poland
Romania	Irina Deleanu	12 November 1975 (aged 16)	Bucharest, Romania
Romania	Ancuța Goia	22 June 1976 (aged 16)	
South Korea	Kim Yoo-kyung	1 October 1975 (aged 16)	
South Korea	Yun Byeong-hui	15 February 1976 (aged 16)	
Spain	Carmen Acedo	10 February 1975 (aged 17)	Lleida, Spain
Spain	Carolina Pascual	17 June 1976 (aged 16)	Orihuela, Spain
Unified Team	Oksana Skaldina	24 May 1972 (aged 20)	Zaporizhzhia, Ukrainian SSR
Unified Team	Aleksandra Timoshenko	18 February 1972 (aged 20)	Bohuslav, Ukrainian SSR
United States	Tamara Levinson	17 November 1976 (aged 15)	Buenos Aires, Argentina
United States	Jenifer Lovell	1 February 1974 (aged 18)	Miami, Florida
