= Gymnastics at the 1992 Summer Olympics – Women's rhythmic individual all-around =

Women's rhythmic individual all-around at the Games of the XXV Olympiad
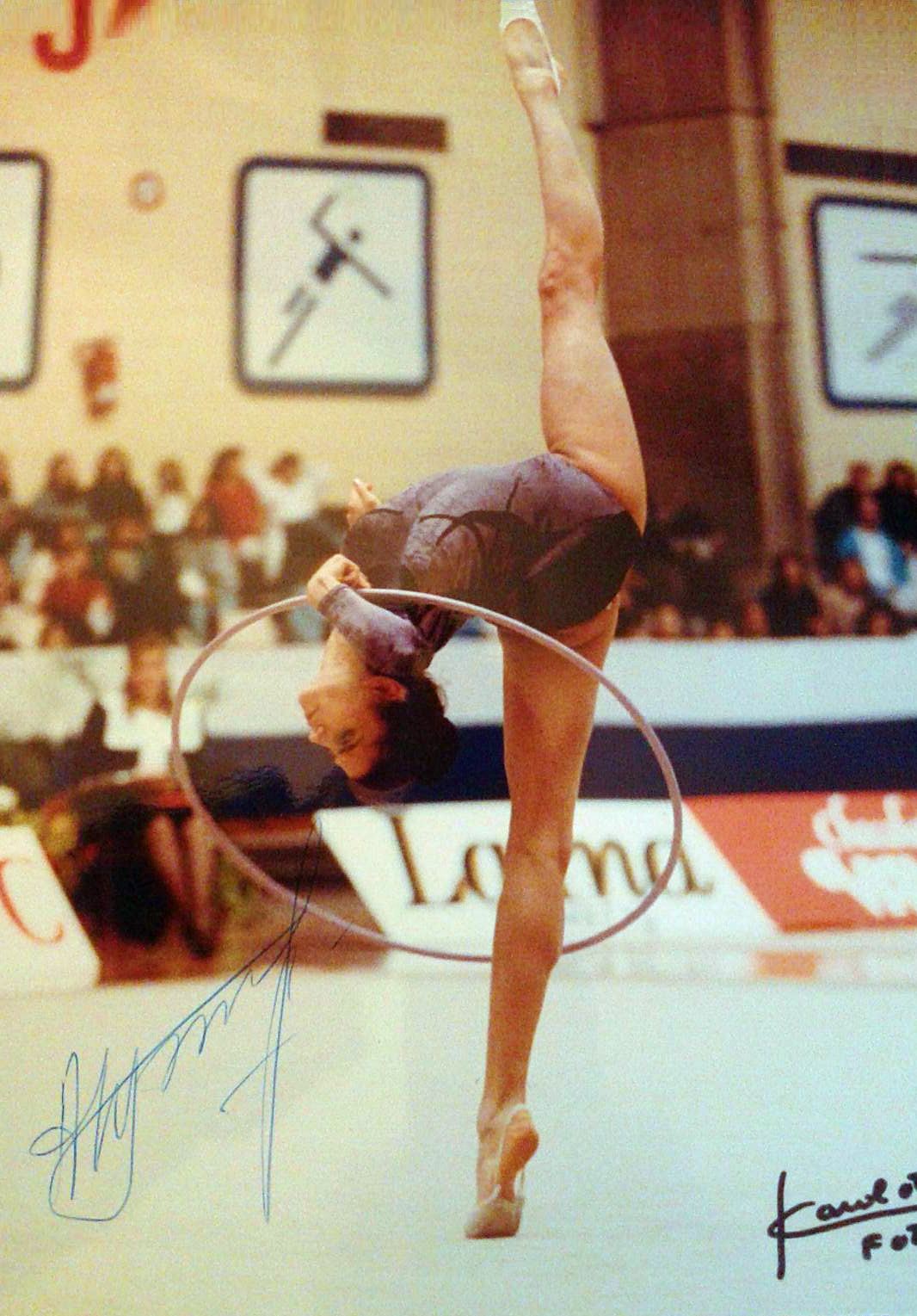
- Gold medalist Alexandra Timoshenko (1992)
- Venue: Palau dels Esports de Barcelona
- Date: 6 – 8 August 1992
- Competitors: 42 from 23 nations

Medalists
1st place, gold medalist(s)		Alexandra Timoshenko	Unified Team
2nd place, silver medalist(s)		Carolina Pascual	Spain
3rd place, bronze medalist(s)		Oxana Skaldina	Unified Team

These are the results of the rhythmic individual all-around competition, the only Rhythmic Gymnastic event at the 1992 Summer Olympics. The four pieces of apparatus used were ball, clubs, hoop, and rope (ribbon was omitted). 42 gymnasts competed in the preliminary round.

The format for the competition was unusual. Instead of choosing the gymnasts with the highest scores from the qualifying round to advance to the final (as had been the case in 1984 and 1988), it was decided that the six best would qualify for the final, along with the top 12 for each apparatus, meaning that nine of the 17 finalists performed in the final with only one to three pieces of apparatus and had no chance to win.

Each gymnast carried forward half her preliminary round score (prelim score) to the final, where it was added to her score in the final (final score).

== Preliminary round ==
Rank	Name	Rope	Hoop	Ball	Clubs	Prelim Total
1	Alexandra Timoshenko (EUN)	9.800	9.725	9.650	9.800	38.975
2	Oksana Skaldina (EUN)	9.600	9.725	9.725	9.475	38.525
3	Carolina Pascual (ESP)	9.600	9.600	9.625	9.575	38.400
4	Carmen Acedo (ESP)	9.425	9.475	9.600	9.450	37.950
5	Irina Deleanu (ROM)	9.575	9.400	9.400	9.450	37.825
5	Maria Petrova (BUL)	9.475	9.450	9.400	9.500	37.825
7	Diana Popova (BUL)	9.500	9.550	9.550	9.050	37.650
8	Lenka Oulehlová (TCH)	9.450	9.350	9.300	9.375	37.475
9	Joanna Bodak (POL)	9.400	9.325	9.325	9.400	37.450
10	Maria Sansaridou (GRE)	9.400	9.275	9.225	9.200	37.125
11	Samantha Ferrari (ITA)	9.225	9.300	9.300	9.100	36.925
12	Areti Sinapidou (GRE)	9.200	9.275	9.225	9.150	36.850
13	Jana Šramková (TCH)	9.150	9.250	9.300	9.050	36.750
14	Eliza Bialkowska (POL)	9.250	9.350	9.200	8.925	36.725
15	Irene Germini (ITA)	9.325	9.000	9.075	9.275	36.675
16	Ancuța Goia (ROM)	9.000	9.200	9.250	9.050	36.500
17	Li Gyong-hui (PRK)	9.150	9.150	9.275	8.850	36.425
18	Miho Yamada (JPN)	9.100	9.250	9.000	9.050	36.400
19	Chrystelle-Arlette Sahuc (FRA)	9.150	9.050	9.075	9.100	36.375
20	Madonna Gimotea (CAN)	9.325	9.250	9.225	8.550	36.350
20	Christiane Klumpp (GER)	9.350	9.300	8.575	9.125	36.350
22	Debbie Southwick (GBR)	9.200	8.850	9.075	9.025	36.150
23	Jenifer Lovell (USA)	9.025	9.125	8.950	9.025	36.125
24	Viktória Fráter (HUN)	9.000	9.150	9.150	8.800	36.100
25	Céline Degrange (FRA)	9.000	8.975	9.050	8.925	35.950
25	Hanna Laiho (FIN)	9.000	9.100	9.150	8.700	35.950
27	Chong Gum (PRK)	8.875	9.050	9.035	8.925	35.875
28	Andrea Szalay (HUN)	8.950	9.100	9.125	8.650	35.825
29	Bai Mei (CHN)	8.525	9.150	9.125	8.975	35.775
29	Susan Cushman (CAN)	8.850	9.150	8.900	8.875	35.775
29	Viva Seifert (GBR)	8.950	9.150	9.025	8.650	35.775
32	Majda Milak (IOP)	9.000	9.100	8.975	8.600	35.675
33	Kristina Radonjić (IOP)	8.700	9.000	9.100	8.800	35.600
34	Yun Byeong-hui (KOR)	9.225	9.075	8.450	8.750	35.500
35	Kim Yoo-kyung (KOR)	8.875	8.875	8.775	8.850	37.375
36	Guo Shasha (CHN)	8.900	9.300	8.625	8.300	35.125
37	Yukari Kawamoto (JPN)	8.700	9.075	8.875	8.400	35.050
38	Anna Kimonos (CYP)	8.800	8.650	8.875	8.700	35.025
39	Cindy Stollenberg (BEL)	8.875	8.925	8.600	8.550	34.950
40	Tamara Levinson (USA)	9.025	9.000	8.200	8.250	34.475
41	Marta Cristina Schonhurst (BRA)	8.600	8.450	8.650	8.750	34.450
42	Elena Khatzisavva (CYP)	8.450	8.350	8.400	8.575	33.775
	Clara Piçarra (POR)	did not start				

Notes:
- The highest placed non-qualifier for the final, Ancuta Goia, did not advance to the final as she did not place in the top 12 with any of the apparatus (her best was 13th with the ball).
- Christiane Klumpp advanced to the final as she placed in the top 12 with all apparatus except ball. Li Gyong-hui advanced to the final as she placed 12th with the ball.

== Final ==
Rank	Name	Prelim Score	Rope	Hoop	Ball	Clubs	Final score	Total
Gold medal	Alexandra Timoshenko (EUN)	19.487	9.950	9.950	9.700	9.950	39.550	59.037
Silver medal	Carolina Pascual (ESP)	19.200	9.650	9.700	9.775	9.775	38.900	58.100
Bronze medal	Oksana Skaldina (EUN)	19.262	9.525	9.725	9.650	9.750	38.650	57.912
4	Carmen Acedo (ESP)	18.975	9.550	9.600	9.550	9.550	38.250	57.225
5	Maria Petrova (BUL)	18.912	9.575	9.500	9.525	9.575	38.175	57.087
6	Irina Deleanu (ROM)	18.912	9.600	9.100	9.450	9.550	37.700	56.612
7	Joanna Bodak (POL)	18.725	9.300	9.450	9.450	9.550	37.750	56.475
8	Lenka Oulehlová (TCH)	18.737	9.450	9.325	9.450	9.175	37.400	56.137
9	Diana Popova (BUL)	18.825	9.400	9.550	9.550	/	28.500	47.325
10	Christiane Klumpp (GER)	18.175	9.250	9.300	/	9.250	27.800	45.975
11	Maria Sansaridou (GRE)	18.562	9.325	/	/	9.150	18.475	37.037
12	Samantha Ferrari (ITA)	18.525	/	9.200	9.325	/	18.462	36.987
13	Irene Germini (ITA)	18.600	9.300	/	/	9.300	18.337	36.937
14	Areti Sinapidou (GRE)	18.425	/	/	/	9.400	9.400	27.825
15	Eliza Bialkowska (POL)	18.362	/	9.400	/	/	9.400	27.762
16	Jana Šramková (TCH)	18.375	/	/	9.275	/	9.275	27.650
17	Li Gyong-hui (PRK)	18.212	/	/	9.300	/	9.300	27.512
