= 1991 World Rhythmic Gymnastics Championships =

World championship in Greece

- Venue: Peace and Friendship Stadium
- Location: Piraeus, Greece
- Start date: 9 October 1991
- End date: 13 October 1991

The XV World Rhythmic Gymnastics Championships were held in Piraeus, Greece, at Peace and Friendship Stadium, on 9–13 October 1991.

== Individual ==
=== All-around ===
Rank	Gymnast	Country	Point
Gold medal	Oxana Skaldina	Soviet Union	39.575
Silver medal	Alexandra Timoshenko	Soviet Union	39.450
Bronze medal	Mila Marinova	Bulgaria	39.150
4	Kristina Shikerova	Bulgaria	38.875
5	Irina Deleanu	Romania	38.600
6	Monica Ferrandez	Spain	38.050
7	Maria Sansaridou	Greece	37.950
8	Joanna Bodak	Poland	37.775
9	Eliza Bialkowska	Poland	37.525
10	Guo Shasha	China	37.500
11	Samantha Ferrari Gyong Hui Li	Italy North Korea	37.475
13	Mary Fuzesi	Canada	37.400
14	Areti Sinapidou	Greece	37.350
15	Carolina Pascual	Spain	37.275
16	Lenka Oulehlova	Czechoslovakia	37.150
17	Yukari Kawamoto	Japan	36.975
18	Majda Milak	Yugoslavia	36.850
19	Sandra Schöck	Germany	36.775
20	Irene Germini	Italy	36.750
21	Michaela Ziegler	Germany	36.725
22	Crystelle Sahuc	France	36.450
23	Ancuta Goia	Romania	36.425
24	Anita Balogh	Hungary	36.350
25	Hanna Laiho	Finland	36.225
26	Kristina Radonjic	Yugoslavia	35.450

=== Rope ===
Rank	Gymnast	Country	Point
Gold medal	Alexandra Timoshenko	Soviet Union	9.975
Silver medal	Kristina Shekerova	Bulgaria	9.800
Bronze medal	Oxana Skaldina	Soviet Union	9.725
4	Irina Deleanu	Romania	9.675
5	Monica Ferrandez	Spain	9.650
6	Mila Marinova	Bulgaria	9.625
7	Joanna Bodak	Poland	9.550
8	Maria Sansaridou	Greece	9.475

=== Hoop ===
Rank	Gymnast	Country	Point
Gold medal	Alexandra Timoshenko	Soviet Union	10.000
Silver medal	Mila Marinova	Bulgaria	9.975
Bronze medal	Oxana Skaldina	Soviet Union	9.950
4	Kristina Shikerova	Bulgaria	9.725
5	Carmen Acedo	Spain	9.600
6	Maria Sansaridou	Greece	9.575
7	Monica Ferrandez	Spain	9.550
8	Samantha Ferrari	Italy	9.275

=== Ball ===
Rank	Gymnast	Country	Point
Gold medal	Alexandra Timoshenko	Soviet Union	9.975
Silver medal	Oxana Skaldina	Soviet Union	9.800
Bronze medal	Mila Marinova	Bulgaria	9.750
4	Maria Petrova	Bulgaria	9.700
5	Carolina Pascual	Spain	9.550
6	Irina Deleanu Monica Ferrandez	Romania Spain	9.525
8	Maria Sansaridou	Greece	9.450

=== Clubs ===
Rank	Gymnast	Country	Point
Gold medal	Alexandra Timoshenko	Soviet Union	10.000
Silver medal	Mila Marinova	Bulgaria	9.975
Bronze medal	Samantha Ferrari	Italy	9.675
4	Maria Petrova Oksana Skaldina	Bulgaria Soviet Union	9.600
6	Joanna Bodak	Poland	9.550
7	Monica Ferrandez	Spain	9.425
8	Lenka Oulehlova	Czechoslovakia	9.000

=== Team ===
Place	Nation	Total
Gold medal	Soviet Union	118.450
Silver medal	Bulgaria	115.850
Bronze medal	Spain	112.600
4	Poland	112.050
5	Italy	110.550
5	Romania	110.550
7	Greece	110.400
8	Germany	109.750
9	Czechoslovakia	109.700
10	North Korea	108.950
11	Canada	108.750
12	Yugoslavia	108.600
13	Japan	108.300
14	United States	107.750
15	Finland	107.200
16	China	107.000
17	Hungary	106.950
18	France	106.600
19	United Kingdom	106.100
20	Cuba	105.350
21	South Korea	104.550
22	Cyprus	103.650
23	Portugal	102.100
24	Belgium	101.900
24	Netherlands	101.900
26	New Zealand	101.800
27	Brazil	101.600
28	Argentina	99.550
29	Thailand	94.000
30	Egypt	86,400

== Group ==
=== All-around ===
Place	Nation	Total
Gold medal	Spain	38.85
Silver medal	Soviet Union	38.80
Bronze medal	North Korea	38.50
4	Bulgaria	38.05
5	Greece	38.00
6	Japan	37.90
7	Italy	37.85
8	Hungary	37.70
9	Germany	37.65
10	France	37.50
11	Finland	36.85
12	China	36.80
13	Yugoslavia	36.40
14	Canada	36.20
15	Netherlands	36.10
16	Norway	35.15
17	Austria	34.70
18	Brazil	34.45

=== Exercise 6 ribbons ===
Place	Nation	Total
Gold medal	Soviet Union	38.900
Silver medal	Bulgaria Spain	38.850
4	North Korea	38.300
5	Japan	38.200
6	Greece	38.075
7	Hungary	37.700
8	Italy	37.500

=== Exercise 3 ropes + 3 balls ===
Place	Nation	Total
Gold medal	Soviet Union	38.900
Silver medal	Spain	38.750
Bronze medal	North Korea	38.700
4	Greece	38.250
5	Italy	38.000
6	Japan	37.900
7	Germany	37.850
8	Hungary	37.800
