= Madonna Gimotea =

Canadian rhythmic gymnast

- Full name: Madonna Isabelle Gimotea
- Born: October 6, 1974 (age 51) North York, Ontario

Gymnastics career
- Discipline: Rhythmic gymnastics
- Country represented: Canada
- Club: Sport Seneca
Medal record
Pan American Games
Gold medal – first place	1991 Havana	Team
Bronze medal – third place	1991 Havana	Ball
Commonwealth Games
Gold medal – first place	1990 Auckland	Ball
Silver medal – second place	1990 Auckland	All-Around
Silver medal – second place	1990 Auckland	Hoop
Silver medal – second place	1990 Auckland	Ribbon
Silver medal – second place	1990 Auckland	Rope

Madonna Isabelle Gimotea (born October 6, 1974 in North York, Ontario) is a Canadian retired rhythmic gymnast who primarily competed as an individual. She competed at the 1992 Summer Olympics. She won two medals at the 1991 Pan American Games in Havana, Cuba, and five at the 1990 Commonwealth Games in Auckland, New Zealand, including silver in the all-around.

== Career ==
Gimotea began rhythmic gymnastics at age 7. Initially, she trained recreationally and did not think she could become an Olympic-level athlete.

She competed as a junior at the 1988 Four Continents Gymnastics Championships, where she placed sixth in the junior all-around event. The next year, at the Canadian Championships, she tied for all-around bronze with Susan Cushman; she also won silver in the ball and ribbon finals and bronze with rope and hoop. At the 1989 World Championships, she finished in 46th place.

In 1990, she was selected for the Commonwealth Games, where she won silver in the all-around behind teammate Mary Fuzesi. In the apparatus finals, she won gold with the ball and three more silver medals in hoop, ribbon, and rope. Later in the year, she competed at the Four Continents Championships as a senior and tied for 7th place with Diane Simpson.

The next year, Gimotea competed at the 1991 Pan American Games. Along with her teammates, Fuzesi and Cushman, she won gold in the team event. Gimotea called their victory a "nice surprise", as they had been in second place behind the Cuban team after the first two rounds of competition. Individually, Gimotea placed 5th in the all-around, and she tied for bronze in the ball final with Jenifer Lovell. In October, she competed at the 1991 World Championships and placed 39th.

In 1992, Gimotea won the Canadian Championships ahead of Cushman. Due to their results at the national championships, she and Cushman were both selected for the 1992 Summer Olympics. Ahead of the Olympics, Gimotea said she was considering retiring at the end of the year to focus on her studies at Earl Haig Secondary School, as the demands of training and traveling to competitions made it difficult to maintain high grades. Her goal was to finish in the top 20 at the Olympics. She accomplished this by tying for 20th place with Christiane Klumpp. In November, at the World Championships, she placed 21st.

Gimotea continued competing after the 1992 season; initially, she considered retiring after the 1994 Commonwealth Games, which would be held in Canada. She said in early 1993, "I think it would be nice to have my last competition in front of my home crowd." At the Canadian Championships that year, she lost to Camille Martens. In November, at the 1993 World Championships, she placed 47th.

At the end of her career, Gimotea began competing as a member of the national group rather than an individual. She competed as a group member at the 1994 Four Continents Championships, where the Canadian group placed 4th. She also attended the 1994 World Championships. The group placed 18th; only the top 16 groups qualified for the following 1995 World Championships. The next year, at the 1995 Pan American Games, Gimotea and the rest of the Canadian group finished in 4th place.
