= Chrystelle Sahuc =

French rhythmic gymnast (born 1975)

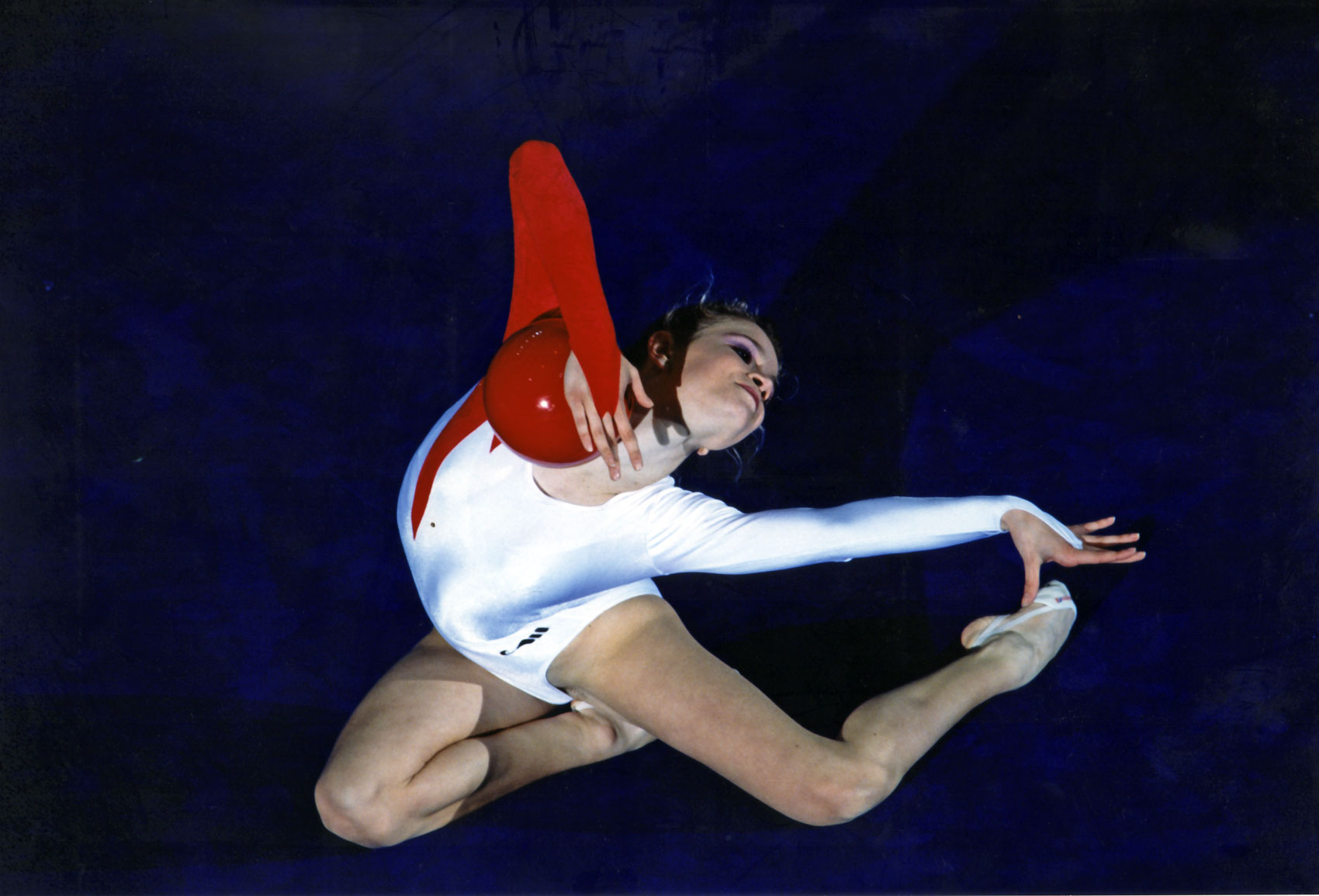

Personal information
- Full name: Chrystelle-Arlette Sahuc
- Born: February 9, 1975 (age 51) Alès, Gard, France
- Height: 158 cm (5 ft 2 in)

Gymnastics career
- Discipline: Rhythmic gymnastics
- Country represented: France
- Club: SCA Evry

Chrystelle-Arlette Sahuc, better known as Chrystelle Sahuc, (born February 9, 1975, Alès, Gard, France) is a retired French rhythmic gymnast. She is a two-time French national all-around champion (1991, 1992).

Sahuc began gymnastics when she was four after her mother enrolled her in lessons at a local club. She won the national senior title in the ball event in 1988 at 13 and joined the senior national team in 1989 at the age of 14. That year, she was the junior national champion and was 9th at the European junior championships.

She debuted on the international senior scene at the 1989 World Championships, where she placed 27th in the qualification round, the best result of the three French individual gymnasts at the competition. At the 1990 European Championships, she qualified for the all-around final, where she placed 20th. At the 1991 World Championships, she finished 22nd in the all-around final.

She competed in the individual rhythmic gymnastics all-around competition at the 1992 Olympic Games in Barcelona. She was 19th in the qualification round and did not advance to the final.
