= Cindy Stollenberg =

Belgian rhythmic gymnast (born 1976)

- Born: 22 July 1976 (age 50) Verviers, Liège, Belgium
- Height: 155 cm (5 ft 1 in)

Gymnastics career
- Discipline: Rhythmic gymnastics
- Country represented: Belgium
- Club: Amel

Cindy Stollenberg (born 22 July 1976, Verviers, Liège, Belgium) is a retired Belgian rhythmic gymnast. She was a five-time national champion, and she was the first Belgian gymnast to compete at two Olympics (1992, 1996).

== Personal life ==
Stollenberg was born into an athletic family; her father was a basketball player. After she began gymnastics, her mother became an international rhythmic gymnastics judge. She has a younger brother who also plays basketball.

She lives in Abu Dhabi, United Arab Emirates, with her husband and three sons. She was a medical secretary for a time and now works for the Luxembourg embassy in Abu Dhabi.

== Gymnastics career ==
Stollenberg began gymnastics at age 7. She soon began to train in Brussels and spent four years frequently traveling back and forth between the gym and her hometown before moving to join the Amel club.

She was the national champion five times between 1990 and 1996. She was nicknamed the 'little fairy'. Stollenberg competed in every World Championships from 1991 to 1995, although she never qualified for the final in years that held separate qualification rounds. At her first in 1991, she tied for 56th place with four other gymnasts. She was 25th in 1992, held in her home country of Belgium; it was her best placement at the World Championships. In 1993, she was 39th, in 1994 she placed 31st, and at her last in 1995, she finished in 38th place.

She represented Belgium in the individual rhythmic gymnastics all-around competition at two Olympic Games: in 1992 in Barcelona and in 1996 in Atlanta. In 1992 she was 39th in the qualification round and didn't advance to the final, while in 1996, she was 31st in the qualification round and didn't advance to the semifinal. Stollenberg retired after her second Olympics at 20 years old; she later stated that she had made the decision a year beforehand.
