= Viligiardi =

Viligiardi is a surname. Notable people with the surname include:

- Alessandro Viligiardi (born 1967), Italian gymnast
- Arturo Viligiardi (1869–1936), Italian painter
