= Cho Hun =

Cho Hun can refer to:

- Cho Hun (gymnast, born 1958), North Korean gymnast
- Cho Hun (gymnast, born 1968), North Korean gymnast
