= Markus Müller =

Markus Müller or Muller may refer to:

- Markus Müller (ski jumper) (born 2002), Austrian ski jumper, see 2025–26 FIS Ski Jumping Continental Cup
- Markus Müller (footballer) (born 1988), German football forward
- Markus Müller (gymnast) (born 1966), Swiss gymnast
- Markus Müller (physician) (born 1967), Austrian pharmacologist
- Markus Muller (rugby union) (born 2007), South African rugby union center

== See also ==
- Marcus Muller (born 1970), South African actor and model
- Marcus Müller (born 2002), German football striker for Mainz
