= Susan Cushman =

Canadian rhythmic gymnast

- Full name: Susan Cushman
- Born: January 7, 1972 (age 54) Cold Lake, Alberta
- Height: 1.72 m (5 ft 8 in)

Gymnastics career
- Discipline: Rhythmic gymnastics
- Country represented: Canada
- Club: Winnipeg High Performance Centre
Medal record
Pan American Games
Gold medal – first place	1991 Havana	Team
Silver medal – second place	1991 Havana	Hoop
Bronze medal – third place	1991 Havana	All-around
Bronze medal – third place	1987 Indianapolis	Clubs
Universiade
Bronze medal – third place	1991 Sheffield	Clubs

Susan Cushman (born January 7, 1972, in Cold Lake, Alberta) is a Canadian retired individual rhythmic gymnast. She won three medals at the 1991 Pan American Games, including bronze in the all-around, and competed at the 1992 Summer Olympics.

== Career ==
Cushman was the junior Canadian champion in 1986. That year, she won bronze in the junior competition at the 1986 Four Continents Gymnastics Championships.

The following year, she was the bronze medalist at the Canadian junior championships. At the 1987 Pan American Games, Cushman won a bronze medal in clubs and placed 7th overall.

In 1988, her parents moved to Ottawa. Cushman remained in Winnipeg to continue training. Cushman said of her decision, "It's not that hard because even when my parents were there I didn't see much of them. I was always practising anyway. They've been really supportive all along." She competed at the 1988 Four Continents Championships held in Toronto, where she placed 16th; during the competition, her music started too early for both of her first two routines.

Cushman competed at the trials for one of the two available places on the 1988 Summer Olympics team. She placed second at the trials, ahead of Lise Gautreau by just 0.10 points, but she was not selected for the team; earlier in the year, she had finished fourth at the Canadian national championships, which counted for 20% of an athlete's selection score. Gautreau was selected for the team instead, along with Mary Fuzesi.

In 1989, Cushman tied for bronze at the Canadian Championships with Madonna Gimotea. The year after, she finished in fifth place in the all-around at the 1990 Commonwealth Games with a score of 36.450. At the Four Continents Championships, she placed 10th.

In July 1991, Cushman competed at the 1991 Summer Universiade, where she won bronze in the clubs final. In August, she competed at the 1991 Pan American Games in Havana. Along with her teammates, Fuzesi and Gimotea, she won gold in the team competition. Cushman said that she thought that the judging was politically biased in favor of the Cuban gymnasts, but that "we had beat them all year and we knew we could do it again." Individually, she won bronze in the all-around, and she also qualified for three event finals and won a tied silver with the hoop. In October, she attended the 1991 World Championships in Athens, where she finished in 42nd place in the all-around.

In 1992, Cushman again attempted to win a berth on the Olympic team. This time, she was selected along with Gimotea after placing second at the national championships. She competed at the 1992 Summer Olympics in September and finished in a tied 29th place in the preliminary round. In November, she competed at her second World Championships, where she placed 31st.

Cushman retired at the end of 1992. In an interview, she said that the Canadian Rhythmic Gymnastics Federation had made her sign a "weight contract" after the Olympics demanding that she lose 20 pounds (9.1 kg) before she would be allowed to compete at the World Championships. She said that to lose the weight, she ate nothing for four days and also drank and ate nothing for two days straight while intensifying her training routine. The president of the Federation disputed her account, saying that while Cushman was asked to drop 8 pounds (3.6 kg) of "problem" weight after consultation with a doctor to determine her ideal competitive weight, it was not required of her, and she was given access to nutritionists and sports psychologists.
