= Modlitba =

Modlitba may refer to:

- "Modlitba" (song), 1998 song by Katarína Hasprová
- Martin Modlitba (born 1970), a Slovak gymnast

== See also ==
- "Molitva", a 2007 song
