= 1992 World Rhythmic Gymnastics Championships =

- Location: Brussels, Belgium
- Start date: 20 November 1992
- End date: 22 November 1992

The XVI World Rhythmic Gymnastics Championships were held in Brussels, Belgium, on 20–22 November, 1992.

Due to the number of competitors at the 1991 World Championships, which meant that the event needed to be lengthened to five days, the International Gymnastics Federation voted to hold separate individual and group championships in alternating years. The 1992 Championships were focused on groups, although a limited number of individuals (36) also participated. Countries qualified individuals based on the results of the 1991 World Championships.

Groups competed one routine with six ribbons and another with three ropes and three balls. Six countries made their World Championships debut following the dissolution of the Soviet Union: Ukraine, Belarus, Lithuania, Estonia, Latvia, and Slovenia.

== Individual ==
=== All-Around ===
Rank	Gymnast	Country	Point
Gold medal	Oxana Kostina	Russia	38.975
Silver medal	Maria Petrova	Bulgaria	38.400
Bronze medal	Larissa Lukianenko	Belarus	38.300
4	Carmen Acedo	Spain	38.125
5	Ekaterina Serebrianskaya	Ukraine	38.075
6	Diana Popova	Bulgaria	38.000
7	Irina Deleanu	Romania	37.950
8	Christiane Klumpp	Germany	37.525
9	Lenka Oulehlova	Czechoslovakia	37.475
10	Victoria Yani	Ukraine	37.425
11	Eliza Bialkowska	Poland	37.400
12	Magdalena Brzeska	Germany	37.250
13	Guo Shasha	China	37.125
14	Hanna Laiho	Finland	37.100
15	Viktoria Frater	Hungary	37.000
16	Yukari Kawamoto	Japan	36.900
...			

=== Final Rope ===
Rank	Gymnast	Country	Point
Gold medal	Larissa Lukianenko	Belarus	9.800
Gold medal	Oxana Kostina	Russia	9.800
Bronze medal	Irina Deleanu	Romania	9.650
4	Carmen Acedo	Spain	9.575
5	Diana Popova	Bulgaria	9.450
6	Ekaterina Serebrianskaya	Ukraine	9.425
7	Maria Petrova	Bulgaria	9.400
7	Lenka Oulehlová	Czechoslovakia	9.400

=== Final Hoop ===
Rank	Gymnast	Country	Point
Gold medal	Larissa Lukianenko	Belarus	9.800
Gold medal	Oxana Kostina	Russia	9.800
Bronze medal	Maria Petrova	Bulgaria	9.675
4	Carmen Acedo	Spain	9.600
5	Ekaterina Serebrianskaya	Ukraine	9.575
6	Diana Popova	Bulgaria	9.550
7	Irina Deleanu	Romania	9.525
8	Lenka Oulehlová	Czechoslovakia	9.400

=== Final Ball ===
Rank	Gymnast	Country	Point
Gold medal	Oxana Kostina	Russia	9.950
Silver medal	Maria Petrova	Bulgaria	9.800
Silver medal	Carmen Acedo	Spain	9.800
4	Diana Popova	Bulgaria	9.675
5	Larissa Lukianenko	Belarus	9.650
6	Irina Deleanu	Romania	9.625
7	Ekaterina Serebrianskaya	Ukraine	9.575
8	Eliza Bialkowska	Poland	9.550

=== Final clubs ===
Rank	Gymnast	Country	Point
Gold medal	Oxana Kostina	Russia	9.775
Silver medal	Maria Petrova	Bulgaria	9.700
Bronze medal	Diana Popova	Bulgaria	9.625
Bronze medal	Carmen Acedo	Spain	9.625
5	Irina Deleanu	Romania	9.550
6	Ekaterina Serebrianskaya	Ukraine	9.525
7	Viktoriya Yani	Ukraine	9.475
8	Maria Sansaridou	Greece	9.425

== Group ==
=== All-Around ===
Place	Nation	Total
Gold medal	Russia	38.650
Silver medal	Spain	38.550
Bronze medal	North Korea	38.550
4	Italy	38.450
5	Ukraine	38.400
6	China	37.900
6	Germany	37.900
6	Greece	37.900
9	Japan	37.850
10	France	37.800
11	Belarus	37.700
12	Finland	37.400
...		

=== Final 6 ribbons ===
Place	Nation	Total
Gold medal	Russia	38.875
Silver medal	Italy	38.650
Bronze medal	Spain	38.500
4	Ukraine	38.400
4	North Korea	38.400
6	Greece	38.200
7	Japan	38.050
8	France	38.000

=== Final 3 ropes + 3 balls ===
Place	Nation	Total
Gold medal	Russia	38.750
Silver medal	Ukraine	38.600
Bronze medal	Italy	38.450
4	Bulgaria	38.400
5	Belarus	38.350
5	Germany	38.350
7	China	38.250
8	Spain	38.000
