= Byung-hee =

- Hangul: 병희
- RR: Byeonghui
- MR: Pyŏnghŭi

Byung-hee is a Korean given name.

People with this name include:

- Son Byong-hi (1861–1922), Korean independence activist
- Hong Byung-hee (born 1971), South Korean chemistry researcher
- Yun Byeong-hui (born 1976), South Korean rhythmic gymnast
- Kim Byung-Hee (born 1982), South Korean sport shooter
- G.O (singer) (born Jung Byung-hee, 1987), South Korean singer, member of boy band MBLAQ

Fictional characters with this name include:

- Go Byung-hee, in 2006 South Korean television series What's Up Fox
- Joo Byung-hee, in 2012 South Korean television series Shut Up Flower Boy Band
- Kim Byung-hee, in 2020 South Korean television series Nobody Knows

== See also ==
- List of Korean given names
