= Ana Bautista =

Spanish rhythmic gymnast

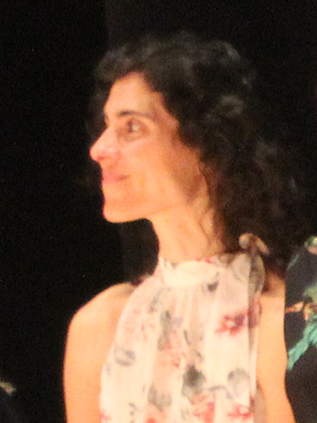

Personal information
- Full name: Ana Bautista Reyes
- Born: 13 June 1972 (age 54) Santa Cruz de Tenerife, Spain

Gymnastics career
- Discipline: Rhythmic gymnastics
- Country represented: Spain (1986–1990)
- Club: Club Odisea
- Head coach: Emilia Boneva
- Retired: yes
Medal record
| Event | 1st | 2nd | 3rd |
|---|---|---|---|
| European Championships | 0 | 1 | 0 |
| World Championships | 0 | 0 | 1 |
| European Cup | 1 | 1 | 2 |
| Total | 1 | 1 | 3 |
Rhythmic Gymnastics
Representing Spain
World Championships
| Bronze medal – third place | 1989 Sarajevo | Team |
European Cup
| Gold medal – first place | 1989 Hanover | Rope |
| Silver medal – second place | 1989 Hanover | Ball |
| Bronze medal – third place | 1989 Hanover | All-Around |
| Bronze medal – third place | 1989 Hanover | Hoop |

Ana Bautista Reyes (born 13 June 1972) is a former Spanish rhythmic gymnast who was a member of the Spanish national team of rhythmic gymnastics in individual form. In 1989 she won the first official gold medal for Spanish rhythmic gymnastics, with rope in the European Cup finals in Hanover, among others. She was Spanish champion in 1989.

== Career ==
Ana began in rhythmic gymnastics with 10 years of age pushed by her father, Amador Bautista, who was a professional cyclist for Teka. She began to practice it in the Club Odisea of Tenerife, being trained by Nelva Estévez. In 1982 she won silver medal in the children category at the Individual Spanish Championship held in Palencia. In 1984 she was the first Spanish champion from Nelva, and in 1984 she was also trained by Margarita Tomova. In 1985 she was the gold medallist in 2nd category at the Spanish Individual Championship in Cádiz.

In 1986, at the age of 14, she was chosen by Emilia Boneva as a junior individual for the national rhythmic gymnastics team, she then moved to Madrid to concentrate with the team, they trained at Moscardó Gymnasium. In November 1986 she was 7th at Errey's International Rhythmic. In April 1987 she placed 12th in a junior tournament in the Algarve, and in May, she was 17th in the All-Around of the Athens Junior European Championship. She would then be selected by Boneva to become a senior individual on the national team. In November 1987, at the «Rhythmic Competition» in London, she took 10th place in the All-Around.

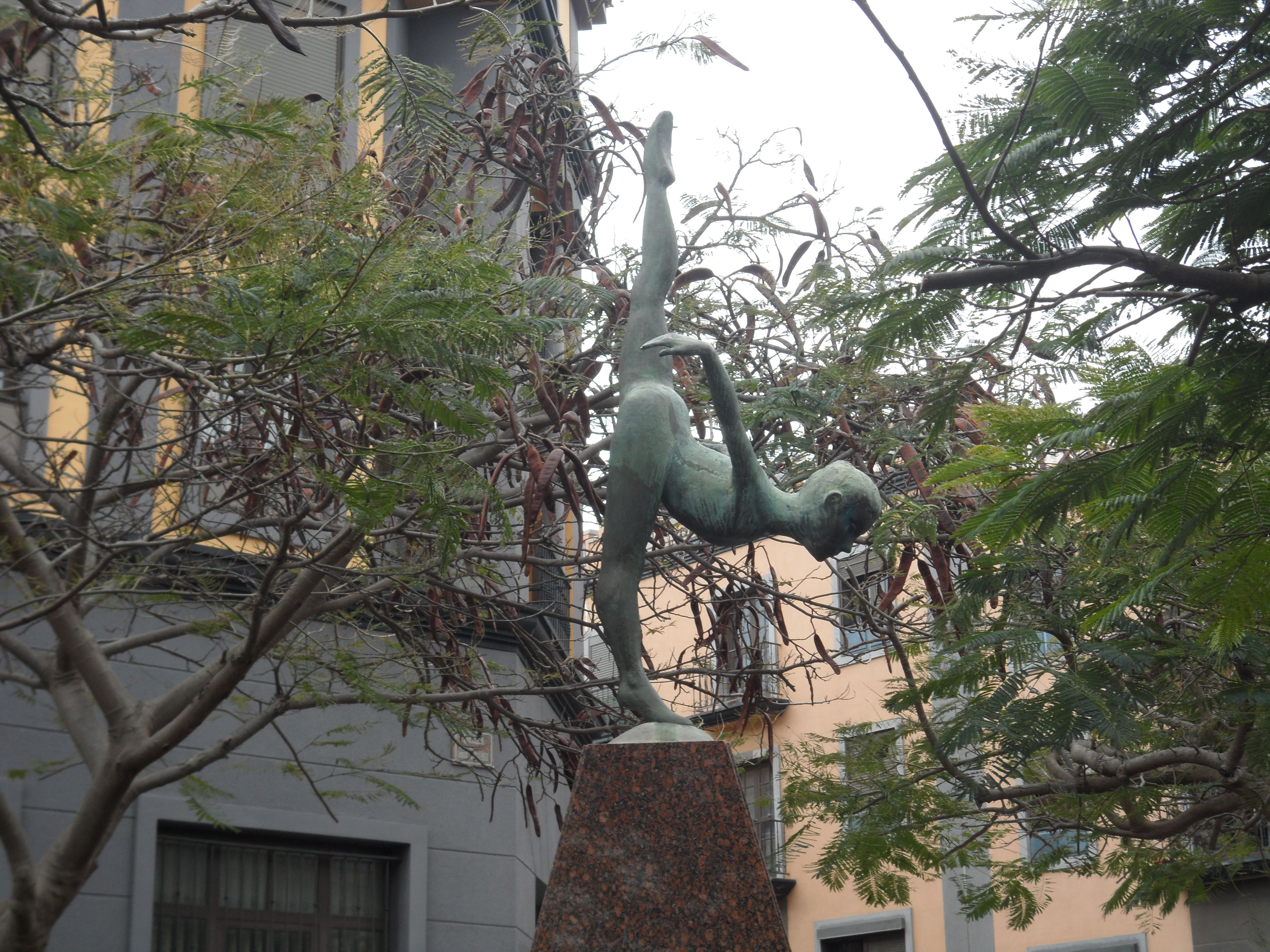
Sculpture of Ana Bautista by Fernando Garcíarramos, seen from behind.

In May 1988 she placed 19th overall at the Helsinki European Championships. In August, at the Les Stars tournament in Varna, she was 8th. In September she traveled to the Olympic Games as a reserve gymnast for the team, although she did not compete. In November he won silver at the I Ibero-American Gymnastics Games in Buenos Aires. In July 1989 she was Spanish champion in the honor category. She then went to the European Cup Final, held in the German city of Hanover between 26 and 27 August, where she won bronze in the All-Around, in addition to gold with ribbon, bronze with hoop, silver with ball and 4th place with ribbon. The gold in gold Bautista got in the rope final was a milestone for rhythmic gymnastics in Spain, since it was the first official gold medal in the sport, finishing ahead of gymnasts like the Soviet Alexandra Timoshenko or the Bulgarian Adriana Dunavska, of traditionally dominant countries in the discipline. This achievement was widely reported in the national and local press of the time. The rope exercise with which she achieved the gold had been mounted two weeks earlier and had as music "El sombrero de tres picos" by Manuel de Falla.

In September 1989 at the World Championships in Sarajevo she won a bronze team medal alongside Ada Liberio and Silvia Yustos. She was 5th in the All-Around, while in the apparatus finals she obtained 5th place with rope, 6th with hoop, 5th with both ball and rope.

She retired at the age of 17 in April 1990, motivated mainly by a cervical injury she had been dragging after a fall she had suffered training three years earlier. After spending two years at her home in Tenerife, she returned to Madrid to study psychology while working as an assistant coach to Emilia Boneva. She was the individual national coach of the Spanish rhythmic gymnastics team from late 1996 until before the 2000 Summer Olympics, where she coached gymnasts such as Almudena Cid, Alba Caride, Esther Domínguez and Adassa Ramos. She was also the technical coordinator of the Spanish team that went to the 2008 Summer Olympics and in 2009 she held a campus in Tenerife with Anna Baranova.

A pavilion inaugurated in 1996 in the district of Duggi in Santa Cruz de Tenerife is named after Municipal Pavilion Ana Bautista, where the rhythmic gymnastics clubs Club Odisea Tenerife, Club Batistana de Tenerife and Club Evangim Santa Cruz, among others, train. In addition, a square was also named after her in the neighborhood of La Cuesta in San Cristóbal de La Laguna, where a sculpture by Fernando Garcíarramos is located in her honor.

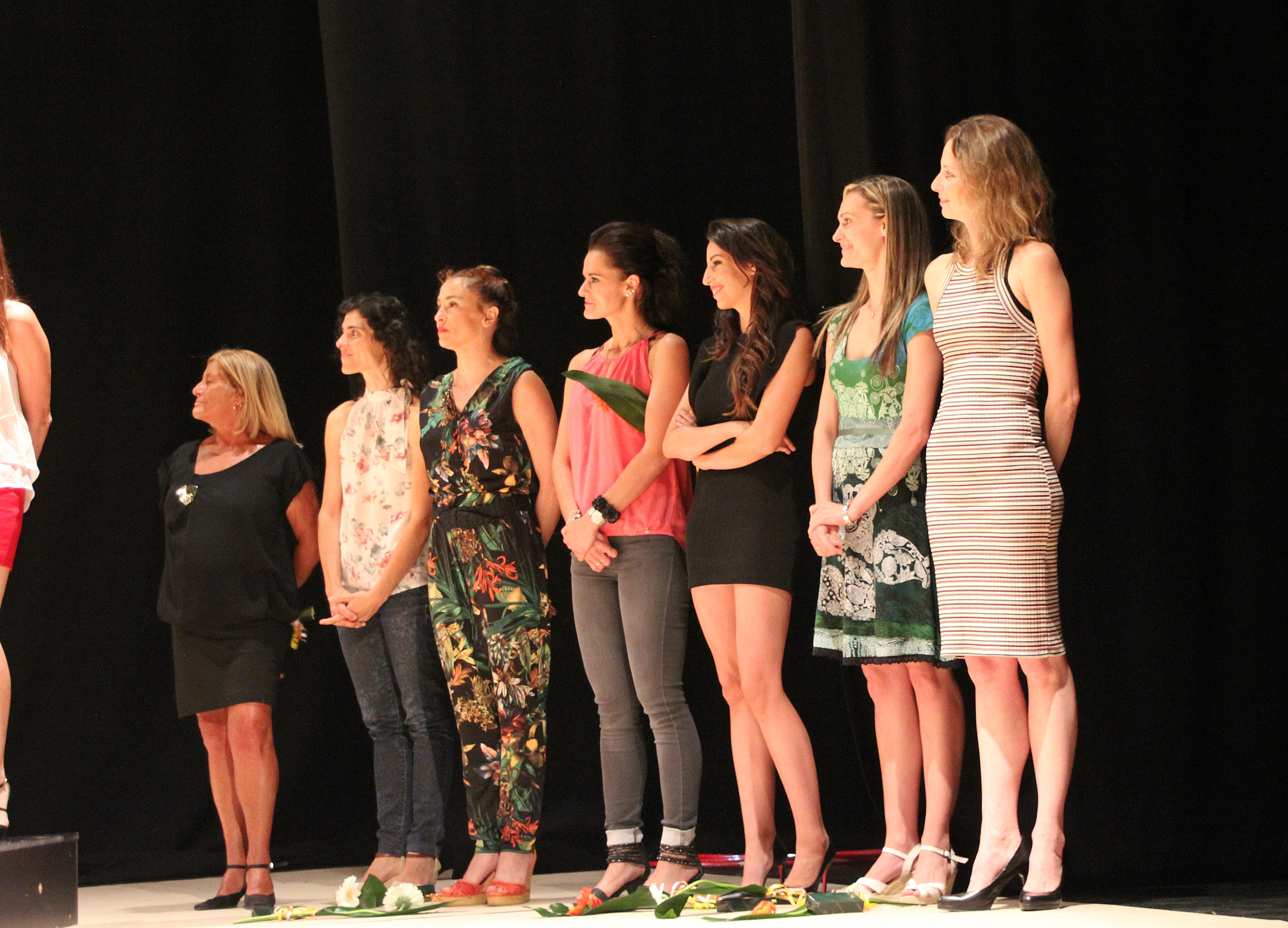
Ana (2nd from left) at the gala for the gold medal at Atlanta '96

On 23 July 2016 she was one of the leading figures of Spanish rhythmic gymnastics invited to the 20th Anniversary Gala of the gold medal in Atlanta '96, held in Badajoz. She currently lives in Palma de Mallorca with her family and has a daughter named Leia, born in 2002. She works as a psychologist and also collaborates with various rhythmic gymnastics clubs in fields such as body work and dance therapy.

In 2016 she wrote the prologue of the book Pinceladas de rittmica by Montse Martín and Manel Martín, which also includes two illustrations of her made by Montse and a biography of her sports career. In September 2018 she traveled with several former gymnasts of the Spanish team to the World Championships in Sofia to reunite with the former national coach Emilia Boneva, she also organized a tribute dinner in her honor.
