= Lenka Oulehlová =

Czech rhythmic gymnast (born 1973)

- Born: 14 June 1973 (age 53) Brno, Czechoslovakia
- Height: 1.73 m (5 ft 8 in)

Gymnastics career
- Discipline: Rhythmic gymnastics
- Country represented: Czechoslovakia → Czech Republic
- Club: Moravská Slavia Brno, Brno

Lenka Hyblerová-Oulehlová, (née Oulehlová; born 14 June 1973) is a Czech retired individual rhythmic gymnast. She competed at three Olympics: 1988 in Seoul, 1992 in Barcelona, and 1996 in Atlanta. She initially represented Czechoslovakia, then represented the Czech Republic after the dissolution of Czechoslovakia. She has since worked as a coach, in gymnastics-related media, and on the board of the Czech Union of Rhythmic Gymnastics.

== Career ==
Oulehlová won seven national all-around titles in her career from 1989 to 1996.

She competed at her first World Championships at the 1987 World Championships in Varna, Bulgaria. She placed 30th in the all-around. The placements of herself and her teammates, Denisa Sokolovská and Andrea Koppová, allowed Czechoslovakia to enter two gymnasts at the 1988 Summer Olympics.

The next year, at the 1988 European Championships, she placed 22nd. She was selected to compete at the 1988 Summer Olympics, where she placed 22nd again in the qualification round.

Oulehlová became the top Czechoslovak gymnast in 1989. At the 1989 World Championships in Sarajevo, she placed 12th in the all-around and qualified to the ribbon and rope finals. The next year, at the 1990 European Championships, she finished 10th in the all-around, and she was 16th at the 1991 World Championships.

In 1992, she placed 17th at the European Championships. She was selected to compete that August, along with Jana Šramková, to compete at the 1992 Summer Olympics. She qualified to the final, where she finished in 8th place, which was her best result across all three Olympics. In November, she finished her season at the World Championships, where she placed 9th in the all-around final and qualified to the hoop and rope finals.

She was 18th at the 1993 World Championships. In 1994, she competed on the inaugural Rhythmic Gymnastics Grand Prix and competed at three of the stages in Ludwigsburg, Karlsruhe, and Corbeil-Essonnes, though she did not qualify for the Grand Prix Final. She placed 16th at the 1994 European Championships and 13th at the World Championships.

In 1995, she competed at the 1995 Summer Universiade, where she was 8th in the all-around and qualified to the rope and clubs finals. Shortly after, she competed at the 1995 World Championships, but in the all-around final, she finished in last place, as she only competed two routines.

Oulehlová's last year competing was 1996. At the European Championships in May, she placed 12th. She was selected for her third Olympics, the 1996 Summer Olympics, along with Andrea Šebestová. She competed there in August, where she placed 22nd in qualifications and did not advance into the final. Oulehlová also again competed on the Grand Prix series and qualified to the Grand Prix Final in October, where she was 7th in qualifications.

== Post-gymnastics career ==
Oulehlová works as a coach at a club she founded in 1998 and began commentating rhythmic gymnastics competitions in 2006. She also holds an international judging license. She is currently the Commission for International Relations and Representation at the Czech Union of Rhythmic Gymnastics.
