= Mary Fuzesi =

Canadian rhythmic gymnast

- Full name: Mary Fuzesi
- Born: February 21, 1974 (age 52)
- Height: 5 ft 7 in (1.70 m)

Gymnastics career
- Discipline: Rhythmic gymnastics
- Country represented: Canada
- Club: Sport Seneca
Medal record
World Cup Final
Bronze medal – third place	1990 Brussels	Ribbon
Pan American Games
Gold medal – first place	1991 Havana	Hoop
Gold medal – first place	1991 Havana	Team
Silver medal – second place	1987 Indianapolis	Clubs
Silver medal – second place	1991 Havana	All-Around
Silver medal – second place	1991 Havana	Rope
Silver medal – second place	1991 Havana	Ball
Bronze medal – third place	1987 Indianapolis	All-Around
Bronze medal – third place	1987 Indianapolis	Hoop
Bronze medal – third place	1987 Indianapolis	Ribbon
Bronze medal – third place	1991 Havana	Group
Commonwealth Games
Gold medal – first place	1990 Auckland	All-Around
Gold medal – first place	1990 Auckland	Hoop
Gold medal – first place	1990 Auckland	Ribbon
Silver medal – second place	1990 Auckland	Ball
Bronze medal – third place	1990 Auckland	Rope

Mary Fuzesi (born February 21, 1974, in Budapest, Hungary) is a Canadian retired individual rhythmic gymnast. She competed at the 1988 Summer Olympics. She won a total number of four medals at the 1987 Pan American Games, six medals at the 1991 Pan American Games, and five at the 1990 Commonwealth Games, including the all-around gold.

== Personal life ==
Fuzesi was born in Budapest, Hungary. Her family emigrated to Canada in 1977, where her father worked in construction and her mother worked at a bank. She attended Claude Watson School for the Arts, then Earl Haig Secondary School. Her parents expressed frustration in local news media that the school board would not pay the fees for Fuzesi and other children to attend special programs, like the sports program Fuzesi attended, that were not available in the district.

She has a daughter, Mya, a volleyball player, with Tom Newton, a basketball player.

== Career ==
=== Early career ===
Fuzesi began training in artistic gymnastics at eight years old because she was an energetic child who enjoyed dancing before being selected for her potential as a rhythmic gymnast. She said she switched because "I was good on the floor, but I kept falling off the beam," and she also attributed it to being tall for her age, which was a disadvantage in artistic gymnastics. Fuzesi admired fellow Canadian gymnast Lori Fung, the 1984 Olympic champion, and enjoyed being compared to her, though she noted she wanted to developed her own style of gymnastics.

In 1986, Fuzesi was selected to compete at the Four Continents Gymnastics Championships in the junior division. She tied for first in the all-around with Kaori Ishimi. Domestically, she won the junior pre-elite championships.

The next year, she placed second at the Canadian junior championships behind Lisa Merritt. In August, still too young to compete at the World Championships, she attended the 1987 Pan American Games. At 13, she was the youngest athlete from the Canadian delegation. For two months beforehand, she was not able to train at full capacity due to a back injury. However, she won four medals at the competition: bronze in the all-around, silver with clubs, and two more bronzes with hoop and ribbon. In September, she and her coach went to Bulgaria to compete and train there and so Fuzesi could watch the 1987 World Championships, which were held in Varna.

=== 1988 season ===
In June 1988, Fuzesi attended the 1988 Four Continents Championships to defend her junior title. During her rope routine on the first day of competition, she stumbled on a jump. She said afterward, "When we're doing a routine it's not always going to be perfect. There will always be mistakes in it. So we try to practise covering them up." Despite other mistakes on the second day of competition, she successfully won her second all-around title. In the event finals, she won all but the ball routine, where she won silver. Her coach noted that as she had been competing as a senior in other competitions, and as seniors used the clubs and not the ball that year, Fuzesi had been practicing her clubs routine more than her ball routine.

Ahead of the selection event for the 1988 Summer Olympics, Fuzesi was considered a front-runner for one of the two quotas available, along with Lori Fung. However, shortly before the selection event, Fung unexpectedly retired. Fuzesi won the selection and was given one of the quotas, along with Lise Gautreau. Fuzesi said that she missed Fung's presence at the event and that she would try to live up to the new expectations on her as Canada's top rhythmic gymnast. She also said, "It's a nice feeling that I'm now the best in Canada. But I still have to prove myself at the Canadian championships next year. I don't have my own national title yet."

Fuzesi was the youngest athlete in the Canadian Olympic delegation. Her goal at the Olympics was to place within the top 10; she did so with a score of 58.450, which put her in 10th place in the all-around finals. She was chosen as the 1988 female junior athlete of the year for Canada.

=== Post-Olympic career ===
At the end of April 1989, Fuzesi left Canada to compete in France and Bulgaria. In May, she competed at the Brother Cup in Tokyo, where she won bronze in the all-around and again in the ribbon final. This was the first time a Canadian athlete had won any medal in a competition attended by the Eastern Bloc countries that dominated rhythmic gymnastics, the Soviet Union and Bulgaria. In an interview, Fuzesi expressed excitement over her medals. She also said that she enjoyed meeting new gymnasts from various countries and that she thought it was "educational" to have "friends from different places in the world".

In June, she won the Canadian championships and also won the hoop and rope finals. She made mistakes in her ball and ribbon final routines, which were won by Lisa Merritt. Fuzesi attributed her mistakes to being tired from traveling so much before the competition. Selected for the 1989 World Championships in October, she entered the event ranked outside the "A" group, which contained the top 26 gymnasts. However, she finished in 9th place. She briefly returned to Canada before again traveling to Japan to perform in an exhibition.

Fuzesi was a favorite to win the 1990 Commonwealth Games. There, she won the all-around gold as well as the hoop and ribbon finals. In the ball final, she won silver behind teammate Madonna Gimotea, and in the rope final, she won bronze. During the rope final, the judges took time to confer before giving her score. She said of her results, "I'm not sure what the judges were thinking, but it's over and I have to keep going," and that "if I don't deserve something, I expected to be deducted for it," but that she was "a little bit upset" with her rope score.

Fuzesi competed in three qualifying events for the 1990 World Cup before attending the Four Continents Championships in August. After winning silver in the all-around, she won three of the four apparatus titles. In October, at the World Cup, she won the bronze medal in the ribbon final, tied with Irina Deleanu. She was the only individual gymnast to medal who was not from Eastern Europe.

In March 1991, Fuzesi underwent knee surgery and did not train for eight weeks. In August, she competed at the Pan American Games. She and her teammates, Susan Cushman and Gimotea, won the team gold medal. Individually, Fuzesi won silver in the all-around. In the apparatus finals, she won gold with hoop and silver with rope and ball. She went on to compete at the World Championships, held in Athens in October, where she finished in 13th place. She attended the event despite pain in her back. The pain was from a stress fracture in her spine, and she took another three months off from training.

The next year, Fuzesi planned to have another surgery on her back after the 1992 Summer Olympics. However, after finishing a competition in Bulgaria where she felt serious back pain, she retired in May, ahead of the Olympics, due to her back and knee injuries.
