= Four Continents Gymnastics Championships =

The Four Continents Gymnastics Championships refers to two distinct competitions, organized by different federations in different disciplines. In rhythmic gymnastics the tournaments were organized from 1978 to 2001 by the International Gymnastics Federation. In aesthetic group gymnastics the tournaments have been organized by the International Federation of Aesthetic Group Gymnastics since 2014. The events gather competitors from four continents: Africa, the Americas, Asia and Oceania.

== Rhythmic gymnastics ==
The Four Continents Rhythmic Gymnastics Championships was a biennial rhythmic gymnastics tournament proposed to the International Gymnastics Federation (FIG) by Evelyn Koop from Canada and original named the "Pacific Rim Championships". The purpose was to provide a corresponding event to the European Rhythmic Gymnastics Championships as a chance for rhythmic gymnasts from non-European nations to compete internationally and to develop programs outside of Europe. All of the editions of the championships were officially organized by FIG.

The first edition was organized in 1978 in Toronto, Canada. Six countries competed there, with Australia being represented for the first time in international competition; Brazil, Canada, Mexico, New Zealand, and the United States also competed. Cuba declined an invitation as Taiwan was set to compete, and Taiwan withdrew after the People's Republic of China was accepted as a FIG member. The last edition of the tournament was held in Curitiba, Brazil, in 2001, with 13 participating countries.

=== Editions ===
Year	Edition	Event	Location
1978	I	1978 Four Continents Rhythmic Gymnastics Championships	(Canada) Toronto
1980	II	1980 Four Continents Rhythmic Gymnastics Championships	(Brazil) Rio de Janeiro
1982	III	1982 Four Continents Rhythmic Gymnastics Championships	(New Zealand) Auckland
1984	IV	1984 Four Continents Rhythmic Gymnastics Championships	(United States) Indianapolis
1986	V	1986 Four Continents Rhythmic Gymnastics Championships	(Australia) Melbourne
1988	VI	1988 Four Continents Rhythmic Gymnastics Championships	(Canada) Toronto
1990	VII	1990 Four Continents Rhythmic Gymnastics Championships	(Japan) Tokyo
1992	VIII	1992 Four Continents Rhythmic Gymnastics Championships	(China) Beijing
1994	IX	1994 Four Continents Rhythmic Gymnastics Championships	(South Korea) Seoul
1995	X	1995 Four Continents Rhythmic Gymnastics Championships	(Egypt) Cairo
1997	XI	1997 Four Continents Rhythmic Gymnastics Championships	(Australia) Sydney
1999	XII	1999 Four Continents Rhythmic Gymnastics Championships	(United States) Jacksonville
2001	XIII	2001 Four Continents Rhythmic Gymnastics Championships	(Brazil) Curitiba

=== Individual all-around medalists ===
Year	Location	Gold	Silver	Bronze	Ref.
1978	(Canada) Toronto	(Canada) Debbie Bryant	(Canada) Jana Lazor	(United States) Sue Soffe	
1980	(Brazil) Rio de Janeiro	(Japan) Michio Ota	(United States) Sue Soffe (Japan) Kimie Kimura	—N/a	
1982	(New Zealand) Auckland	(Japan) Hiroko Yamazaki	(Canada) Lori Fung	(Japan) Tomoko Tomita	
1984	(United States) Indianapolis	(Canada) Lori Fung	(Japan) Chieko Hirose	(China) Xia Yanfei	
1986	(Australia) Melbourne	(Canada) Lori Fung	(China) Xia Yanfei	(China) He Xiaomin	
1988	(Canada) Toronto	(Canada) Lori Fung	(United States) Michelle Berube	(Japan) Erika Akiyama	
1990	(Japan) Tokyo	(Japan) Erika Akiyama	(Canada) Mary Fuzesi	(North Korea) Li Gyong-hui	
1992	(China) Beijing	(China) Guo Sasha	(China) Bai Mei	(North Korea) Han Yang-ok	
1994	(South Korea) Seoul	(Japan) Miho Yamada	(China) Zhou Xiaojing	(Canada) Camille Martens	
1995	(Egypt) Cairo	(Australia) Kasumi Takahashi	(China) Zhou Xiaojing	(Japan) Akane Yamao	
1997	(Australia) Sydney	(Japan) Yukari Murata	(Japan) Rieko Matsunaga	(China) Zhou Xiaojing	
1999	(United States) Jacksonville	(Japan) Yukari Murata	(Japan) Rieko Matsunaga	(Canada) Erika Stirton	
2001	(Brazil) Curitiba	(Canada) Mary Sanders	(China) Sun Dan	(Argentina) Anahí Sosa	

== Aesthetic group gymnastics ==
The Four Continents Aesthetic Group Gymnastics Championships are organized and sanctioned by the International Federation of Aesthetic Group Gymnastics (IFAAG).

=== Editions ===
Year	Event	Location	Gold	Silver	Bronze	Ref.
2014	1st Four Continents Aesthetic Group Gymnastics Championships	(Canada) Toronto	Canada; Rhythmic Expressions	Japan; Team Shoin	Canada; Jusco	
2015	2nd Four Continents Aesthetic Group Gymnastics Championships	(Japan) Nagano	Japan; Team Japan	Japan; Team Shoin	Canada; Rhythmic Expressions	
2017	3rd Four Continents Aesthetic Group Gymnastics Championships	(United States) Chicago	Japan; JWCPE AGG Team	Canada; Rhythmic Expressions	Brazil; Marrie Cotia	
2019	4th Four Continents Aesthetic Group Gymnastics Championships	Singapore	Japan; Team Japan	Japan; JWCPE AGG Team	Canada; Rhythmic Expressions	
2023	5th Four Continents Aesthetic Group Gymnastics Championships	(Kazakhstan) Almaty	Japan; Team Shoin	Kazakhstan; Freedom	Kazakhstan; Sunrise	
2025	6th Four Continents Aesthetic Group Gymnastics Championships	(Canada) Toronto	United States; National Team Elara	Japan; TWCPE Amin	Canada; Rosettes	

== See also ==
- Asian Gymnastics Championships
- Pan American Gymnastics Championships
