= Yukari Kawamoto =

Japanese rhythmic gymnast

- Born: June 13, 1970 (age 56) Kiyose, Tokyo, Japan
- Height: 164 cm (5 ft 5 in)

Gymnastics career
- Discipline: Rhythmic gymnastics
- Country represented: Japan
- Club: Tokyo Women's Physical School
Medal record
Representing Japan
Asian Games
Gold medal – first place	1994 Hiroshima	All-Around
Summer Universiade
Silver medal – second place	1991 Sheffield	Ribbon
Silver medal – second place	1991 Sheffield	Rope

Yukari Kawamoto (Japanese: 川本 ゆかり, born June 13, 1970, Kiyose, Tokyo, Japan) is a retired Japanese individual rhythmic gymnast. She was the first rhythmic gymnastics Asian Games champion in 1994, was a five-time national champion, and competed at the 1992 Summer Olympics.

== Career ==
Kawamoto began gymnastics when she was in fifth grade at about age 11. She was a five-time all-around national champion from 1990 to 1994.

In 1989, she competed at her first World Championships in Sarajevo. She placed 41st. Two years later, she placed 23rd at the 1991 World Championships. That year, she competed at the 1991 Summer Universiade, the first year that rhythmic gymnastics were included in the Universiade, and won two medals: silver in rope (tied with He Xiaomin) and silver in hoop.

The next year, she competed for Japan in the individual rhythmic gymnastics all-around competition at the 1992 Olympic Games in Barcelona. She placed 37th in the qualification round and didn't advance to the final. Later that year, she was again selected to compete at the 1992 World Rhythmic Gymnastics Championships, where she placed 16th.

In 1993, she competed at the World Championships and placed 15th, her best results at the World Championships.

In 1994, the Asian Games held a rhythmic gymnastics competition for the first time. Kawamoto won the event's first gold medal; her teammate Miho Yamada won the bronze medal.

She retired in 1994 after winning her last national title. She now works for the city of Kiyose's sports department.
