= Oksana Skaldina =

Ukrainian rhythmic gymnast

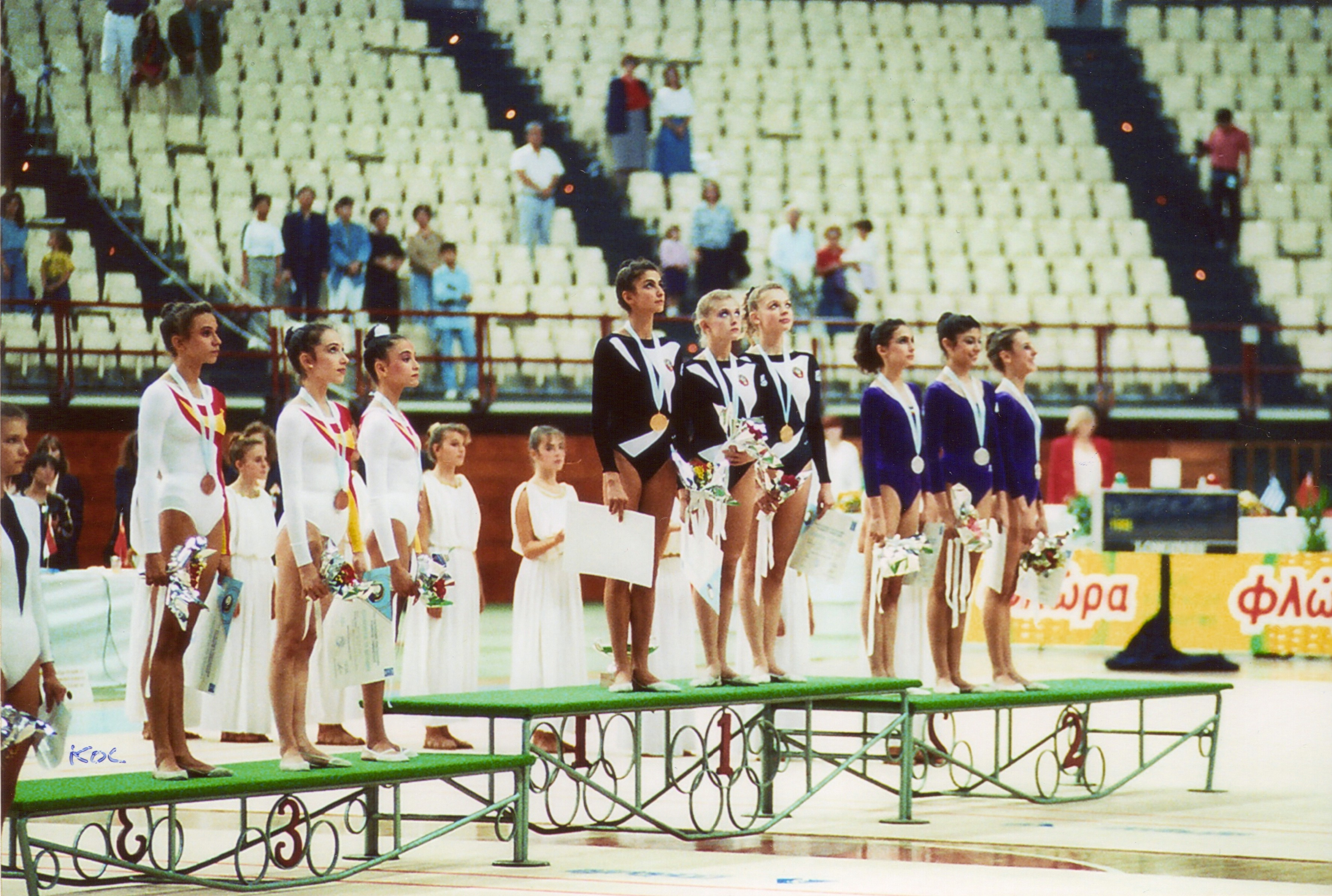
- Skaldina (right) at the 1991 World Championships

Personal information
- Born: 24 May 1972 (age 54) Zaporizhia, Ukrainian SSR, USSR

Gymnastics career
- Discipline: Rhythmic gymnastics
- Country represented: Ukraine
- Former countries represented: Unified Team; Soviet Union
- Club: Deriugins School
- Head coaches: Irina Deriugina, Albina Deriugina
- Former coach: Lyudmila Kovalik
Medal record
Rhythmic Gymnastics
Olympic Games
Representing Unified Team
Bronze medal – third place	1992 Barcelona	All-around
Representing Ukraine
European Championships
Gold medal – first place	1992 Stuttgart	Rope
Gold medal – first place	1992 Stuttgart	Hoop
Gold medal – first place	1992 Stuttgart	Clubs
Representing Soviet Union
World Championships
Gold medal – first place	1989 Sarajevo	Rope
Gold medal – first place	1989 Sarajevo	Hoop
Gold medal – first place	1989 Sarajevo	Ribbon
Gold medal – first place	1989 Sarajevo	Team
Gold medal – first place	1991 Athens	All-around
Gold medal – first place	1991 Athens	Team
Silver medal – second place	1991 Athens	Ball
Bronze medal – third place	1989 Sarajevo	All-around
Bronze medal – third place	1991 Athens	Rope
Bronze medal – third place	1991 Athens	Hoop
World Cup Final
Gold medal – first place	1990 Brussels	All-around
Gold medal – first place	1990 Brussels	Rope
Gold medal – first place	1990 Brussels	Hoop
Gold medal – first place	1990 Brussels	Ball
European Championships
Gold medal – first place	1990 Gothenburg	Rope
Gold medal – first place	1990 Gothenburg	Ball
Gold medal – first place	1990 Gothenburg	Ribbon
Gold medal – first place	1990 Gothenburg	Team
Bronze medal – third place	1990 Gothenburg	All-Around
European Cup Final
Gold medal – first place	1988 Hanover	Hoop
Gold medal – first place	1991 Brussels	Clubs
Silver medal – second place	1988 Hanover	Ball
Silver medal – second place	1988 Hanover	Ribbon
Silver medal – second place	1991 Brussels	All-around
Bronze medal – third place	1991 Brussels	Ball
Goodwill Games
Gold medal – first place	1990 Seattle	All-around
Gold medal – first place	1990 Seattle	Rope
Gold medal – first place	1990 Seattle	Ball
Silver medal – second place	1990 Seattle	Ribbon
Silver medal – second place	1990 Seattle	Hoop

Oksana Valentinovna Skaldina (Ukrainian: Оксана Валентинівна Скалдіна; Russian: Оксана Валентиновна Скалдина) is a retired Ukrainian individual rhythmic gymnast and current coach. She is the 1992 Olympic bronze medalist and 1991 all-around world champion.

== Biography ==
Skaldina was born on 24 May 1972 in Zaporizhia, Ukrainian SSR, to an engineer and a kindergarten inspector.

Skaldina started training in gymnastics at the age of 5 with Lyudmila Kovalik. When she moved to Kyiv, she began training at the Deryugins School with Albina and Irina Deriugina.

Skaldina's breakthrough came at the 1988 European Cup, where she placed fifth in the all-around and won the ball title. She shared in the Soviet silver-medal finish behind Bulgaria at the 1989 World Championships, and also claimed the all-around bronze and three golds (rope, hoop, ribbon). In 1990, she placed first at the Intervision Cup, Goodwill Games, USSR National Championships and World Cup, third at the European Championships, and became the 1991 World All-around champion.

Following the break-up of the Soviet Union, Skaldina and her teammate Olexandra Tymoshenko, both coached by the Deryuginas, competed for Ukraine at the 1992 European Championships in Stuttgart. Skaldina placed fifth in the all-around and won three apparatus gold medals. At the 1992 Summer Olympics, the ex-USSR countries qualified as one Unified Team based on their results as the Soviet team the previous year. Although Russia's Oxana Kostina had a better competitive season, Skaldina was named to the Olympic team along with compatriot Timoshenko. (As individual athletes not competing in team sports in Barcelona, they both competed under the Ukrainian flag.) In Barcelona, Timoshenko won the gold medal while Skaldina settled for bronze behind Spain's Carolina Pascual. In tears, she refused to acknowledge Pascual and shake her hand during the medal ceremony, resulting in boos from the Spanish audience. She retired after the competition.

== Personal life ==
She was married to three-time Olympian Dmitry Svatkovsky, an Olympic gold and silver medalist in modern pentathlon. They met at the 1992 Olympics in Barcelona and four years later had a daughter, Daria Svatkovskaya. Daria was a member of Russia's rhythmic gymnastics national team until a back injury forced her into in retirement in 2014.

After retiring from competition, Skaldina moved to Svatkovsky's hometown of Moscow and began coaching. She currently coaches at Sports School No. 74 and is a member of Russia's national team coaching staff. She is an Honoured Master of Sport for the Soviet Union and an Honoured Coach of Russia.

== Notable trainees ==
- Daria Svatkovskaya
- Lyasan Utiasheva
- Ksenia Dzhalaganiya
- Anna Shishova
- Alexandra Skubova
- Polina Berezina

== Detailed Olympic results ==
Year	Competition description	Location	Music	Apparatus	Score-Final
1992	Olympics	Barcelona		All-around	57.912
1992	Olympics	Barcelona		Prelim	19.262
1992	Olympics	Barcelona	Gopak (Ukrainian Traditional Folk)	Rope	9.525
1992	Olympics	Barcelona	Peer Gynt Suite No.1: In The Hall Of The Mountain King music from Peer Gynt by Edvard Grieg	Hoop	9.725
1992	Olympics	Barcelona	?	Ball	9.650
1992	Olympics	Barcelona	?	Clubs	9.750
