= Li Gyong-hui =

North Korean rhythmic gymnast

- Born: July 10, 1972 (age 54)

Gymnastics career
- Discipline: Rhythmic gymnastics
- Country represented: North Korea
Medal record
Rhythmic gymnastics
Representing North Korea
Four Continents Championships
| Gold medal – first place | 1990 Tokyo | Ball |
| Bronze medal – third place | 1990 Tokyo | All-around |
Summer Universiade
| Gold medal – first place | 1991 Sheffield | All-around |
| Gold medal – first place | 1991 Sheffield | Ball |
| Gold medal – first place | 1991 Sheffield | Rope |
| Silver medal – second place | 1991 Sheffield | Clubs |

Korean name
- Hangul: 이경희
- RR: I Gyeonghui
- MR: I Kyŏnghŭi

Li Gyong-hui (born July 10, 1972) is a retired North Korean rhythmic gymnast and, after her defection, South Korean gymnastic coach.

She competed for the Democratic People's Republic of Korea in the rhythmic gymnastics all-around competition at the 1992 Olympic Games in Barcelona. She was 17th in the qualification and advanced to the final. She placed 17th overall. In 2007, she defected to South Korea and became a gymnastic coach for South Korea.

== Biography ==
=== Early life ===
Li Gyong-hui was born on July 10, 1972, in Pyongyang. Her father (who died in 2004) was a teacher who re-educated major party officials at the Kim Il Sung Higher Party School. She first started rhythmic gymnastics at age 11 because of her mom. Her father originally opposed the idea of making Li into a rhythmic gymnast as he wanted her to go to university and was concerned about her career as a gymnast hindering her academic achievements to go to university.

=== Defecting from North Korea ===
She defected from North Korea in 2007 and now has South Korean citizenship. She worked as a coach for the South Korean rhythmic gymnastics team until 2017. She gained spotlight in South Korea for her sexual assault lawsuit case against the former member of the South Korean gymnastics association.
