= Debbie Southwick =

British rhythmic gymnast

- Full name: Deborah Anne Southwick
- Alternative name: Debbie Georgiou
- Nickname: Debbie
- Born: 11 May 1976 (age 50) Liverpool
- Height: 170 cm (5 ft 7 in)

Gymnastics career
- Discipline: Rhythmic gymnastics
- Country represented: Great Britain
- Club: Merseyside Rhythmic Gymnastics Club
- Head coach: Irina Viner
- Retired: yes
Medal record
Rhythmic Gymnastics
Representing England
Commonwealth Games
Bronze medal – third place	1994 Victoria	All-Around
Bronze medal – third place	1994 Victoria	Team

Deborah Anne "Debbie" Georgiou (née Southwick, born 11 May 1976) is a retired British individual rhythmic gymnast. She won two bronze medals representing England at the 1994 Commonwealth Games and represented Great Britain at the 1992 Olympic Games.

== Career ==
Southwick was born in Liverpool and started competitive gymnastics at 11 years old, when she went from her local gymnastics club in St Helens to a North West regional squad training session. She was then invited to train in Bedford and was launched onto the British team. At 13 years old, she moved to Moscow after Irina Viner, whom for a short period took over the development of the U.K. National Rhythmic Gymnastics Team; saw potential in Southwick and wanted to work with her.

Southwick competed for Great Britain in the rhythmic gymnastics all-around competition at the 1992 Summer Olympics in Barcelona. She was placed 22nd in the qualification round and did not advance to the final. She retired from competitive sport at the age of 18.

Southwick is now a jewellery designer and has stated her clients include Amy Childs, Peter Andre, Katie Piper and Calum Best. She also lends her time as commentator in competitions for the International Federation of Gymnastics.
