= Georgi Lozanov (gymnast) =

Bulgarian gymnast (born 1974)

- Георги Бориславов Лозанов
- Full name: Georgi Borislavov Lozanov
- Born: 3 March 1974 (age 52) Sofia, Bulgaria

Gymnastics career
- Discipline: Men's artistic gymnastics
- Country represented: Bulgaria

Georgi Borislavov Lozanov (Bulgarian: Георги Бориславов Лозанов) (born 3 March 1974) is a Bulgarian gymnast. He competed in eight events at the 1992 Summer Olympics.
