= 1989 World Rhythmic Gymnastics Championships =

- Venue: Zetra Olympic Hall
- Location: (Socialist Federal Republic of Yugoslavia) Sarajevo, SR Bosnia and Herzegovina, Yugoslavia
- Start date: 27 September 1989
- End date: 1 October 1989

The XIV World Rhythmic Gymnastics Championships were held at the Zetra Olympic Hall in Sarajevo, SR Bosnia and Herzegovina, Yugoslavia, on 27 September–1 October 1989.

95 individual gymnasts and 22 groups from 35 countries competed. Groups performed a routine with three hoops and three ribbons as well as a routine with six pairs of clubs.

This was the first time that the team event was contested at the World Championships, though only individual gymnasts were counted in the event. The scores for all three of a country's gymnasts in the all-around qualification were added to decide the team score for that country. This competition was also the first usage of "new life" scoring at the World Championships, when qualification scores were not taken into account in the final rounds.

Gymnasts from the Soviet Union and Bulgaria won the majority of the medals, with the Soviet Union winning 11 (eight gold) and Bulgaria winning 10 (five gold). The only other country to win any medals was Spain; Spanish gymnasts won four bronze medals, one in the team competition and the other three in the group competition.

== Individual ==
=== All-Around ===
Rank	Gymnast	Country	Point
Gold medal	Aleksandra Tymoshenko	Soviet Union	39.750
Silver medal	Bianka Panova	Bulgaria	39.700
Bronze medal	Oksana Skaldina	Soviet Union	39.600
Bronze medal	Adriana Dunavska	Bulgaria	39.600
5	Ana Bautista	Spain	38.650
6	Milena Reljin	Yugoslavia	38.450
7	Samantha Ferrari	Italy	38.350
8	Erika Akiyama	Japan	38.200
9	Mary Fuzesi	Canada	38.100
10	Kyeung Hi Li	North Korea	38.050
11	Esther Nicklas	East Germany	38.000
12	Joanna Bodak Ada Liberio Lenka Oulehlova	Poland Spain Czechoslovakia	37.950
15	Adriana Stonescu	Romania	37.800
16	Zsuzsana Muszil	Hungary	37.650
17	Xiaomin He Dörte Koch	China West Germany	37.600
19	Irina Deleanu Monia Ferretti Marion Rothhaar Jana Vesela	Romania Italy West Germany Czechoslovakia	37.550
23	Erika Pal	Hungary	37.500
24	Souk Yong Ri	North Korea	37.350
25	Eliza Bialkowska	Poland	37.050
26	Diane Simpson	United States	36.750

=== Rope ===
Rank	Gymnast	Country	Point
Gold medal	Bianka Panova	Bulgaria	10.000
Gold medal	Alexandra Timoshenko	Soviet Union	10.000
Gold medal	Oxana Skaldina	Soviet Union	10.000
4	Adriana Dunavska	Bulgaria	9.900
5	Ana Bautista Milena Reljin	Spain Yugoslavia	9.750
7	Eliza Bialkowska	Poland	9.700
8	Lenka Oulehlova	Czechoslovakia	9.600

=== Hoop ===
Rank	Gymnast	Country	Point
Gold medal	Bianka Panova	Bulgaria	10.000
Gold medal	Oxana Skaldina	Soviet Union	10.000
Gold medal	Alexandra Timoshenko	Soviet Union	10.000
4	Adriana Dunavska	Bulgaria	9.900
5	Milena Reljin	Yugoslavia	9.800
6	Ana Bautista	Spain	9.750
7	Eliza Bialkowska	Poland	9.700
8	Ada Liberio	Spain	9.650

=== Ball ===
Rank	Gymnast	Country	Point
Gold medal	Alexandra Timoshenko	Soviet Union	10.000
Silver medal	Adriana Dunavska	Bulgaria	9.900
Silver medal	Bianka Panova	Bulgaria	9.900
Silver medal	Oxana Kostina	Soviet Union	9.900
5	Ana Bautista	Spain	9.800
6	Samantha Ferrari	Italy	9.700
7	Eliza Bialkowska Milena Reljin	Poland Yugoslavia	9.650

=== Ribbon ===
Rank	Gymnast	Country	Point
Gold medal	Oxana Skaldina	Soviet Union	10.000
Silver medal	Adriana Dunavska	Bulgaria	9.900
Silver medal	Julia Baicheva	Bulgaria	9.900
Silver medal	Alexandra Timoshenko	Soviet Union	9.900
5	Ana Bautista	Spain	9.800
6	Eliza Bialkowska Samantha Ferrari	Poland Italy	9.650
8	Lenka Oulehlova	Czechoslovakia	9.550

=== Team ===
Rank	Nation	Total
Gold medal	Bulgaria	118.550
Gold medal	Soviet Union	118.550
Bronze medal	Spain	113.850
4	Poland	113.100
5	Czechoslovakia	112.850
6	Romania	112.550
7	West Germany	112.200
8	Italy	112.100
9	North Korea	111.350
10	China	111.300
10	Hungary	111.300
12	Yugoslavia	111.150
13	Japan	111.050
14	Canada	109.250
14	East Germany	109.250
16	France	109.050
17	Greece	108.750
18	United States	108.600
19	New Zealand	106.050
20	United Kingdom	105.950
21	Finland	105.900
22	Sweden	105.100
23	Portugal	103.800
24	Brazil	103.550
25	South Korea	103.400
26	Norway	103.050
27	Israel	102.700
28	Australia	100.300
29	Cyprus	98.150
30	Netherlands	81.200

== Group ==
=== All-Around ===
Rank	Nation	Total
Gold medal	Bulgaria	38.700
Silver medal	Soviet Union	38.450
Bronze medal	Spain	38.250
4	China	37.650
5	Greece	36.850
6	Japan	36.800
7	North Korea	36.550
8	France	36.350
8	Italy	36.350
10	Finland	36.150
11	Czechoslovakia	35.750
12	United States	35.450
13	Cuba	35.350
14	West Germany	35.100
15	Brazil	34.900
15	Yugoslavia	34.900
17	Hungary	34.850
18	Poland	34.750
19	Canada	34.650
20	Netherlands	34.500
21	Australia	34.050
22	Sweden	33.500

=== Final 6 clubs ===
Rank	Nation	Total
Gold medal	Bulgaria	39.100
Silver medal	Soviet Union	38.650
Bronze medal	Spain	38.400
4	China	38.050
5	Italy	37.800
6	North Korea	37.250
7	Japan	37.050
8	Greece	36.050

=== Final 3 hoops + 3 ribbons ===
Rank	Nation	Total
Gold medal	Soviet Union	39.000
Silver medal	Bulgaria	38.800
Bronze medal	Spain	38.300
4	China	37.650
5	Greece	37.250
6	North Korea	36.850
7	Japan	36.800
8	France	36.050
