= Eliza Białkowska =

Polish rhythmic gymnast (born 1973)

- Born: 19 July 1973 (age 53) Skwierzyna, Lubusz Voivodeship, Poland
- Height: 1.62 m (5 ft 4 in)

Gymnastics career
- Discipline: Rhythmic gymnastics
- Country represented: Poland
- Club: Pocztowca Poznań / Energetyka Poznań

Eliza Białkowska (born 19 July 1973) is a retired Polish rhythmic gymnast who competed in two Olympic games (1988, 1992).

== Personal life ==
Białkowska has a sister. She now lives in Liguria with her husband, and they have four children.

== Gymnastics career ==
At the Polish national level, Białkowska won ten Polish titles, including two all-around titles in 1991 and 1991 and eight event final titles. She represented Poland at four World Championships from 1987 to 1992. In 1987, she tied for 22nd place with Diana Schmiemann and Diane Simpson. In 1989, she reached all four apparatus finals and finished 25th in the all-around. Although she did not qualify for any apparatus finals in 1991, she had her best all-around placement, 9th place. At her last World Championships in 1992, she qualified for the ball final and finished the all-around in 11th place.

Białkowska competed for Poland in the rhythmic gymnastics all-around competition at two Olympic Games: in 1988 in Seoul and in 1992 in Barcelona. In 1988, she was tied for 10th place in the qualification round and finished 14th overall. In 1992, she was 14th in the qualification round and finished the final in 15th.

== Post-gymnastics career ==
After her second Olympics, Białkowska suffered from burnout. Her coach introduced her to a magician friend who was going to Italy to perform; Białkowska joined him as his assistant. In addition to acting as his assistant, she also had solo performances with gymnastics apparatuses and learned pair acrobatics. While in Italy, she met her future husband.

Białkowska worked for several years as a coach at a local gymnastics club. She also qualified to become a judge; she judged at the Italian championships. She also learned how to give physical therapy while she was in Poland.
