= Céline Degrange =

French rhythmic gymnast (born 1978)

- Born: 29 December 1978 (age 47) Moulins, Allier, France
- Height: 150 cm (4 ft 11 in)

Gymnastics career
- Discipline: Rhythmic gymnastics
- Country represented: France
- Club: SCA Evry

Céline Degrange (born 29 December 1978, Moulins, Allier, France) is a retired French rhythmic gymnast.

At the age of 13 and a half, she competed for France in the individual rhythmic gymnastics all-around competition at the 1992 Olympic Games in Barcelona. She tied for 25th place in the qualification round and didn't advance to the final. She was the youngest in the competition.
