= Marta Cristina Schonhurst =

Brazilian rhythmic gymnast

- Born: 11 November 1974 (age 51)

Gymnastics career
- Discipline: Rhythmic gymnastics
- Country represented: Brazil

Marta Cristina Schonhurst (born 11 November 1974 in Passo Fundo) is a retired Brazilian rhythmic gymnast.

She represented Brazil in the rhythmic gymnastics all-around competition at the 1992 Olympic Games in Barcelona. She was 41st in the qualification and didn't qualify for the final.

== See also ==
- List of Olympic rhythmic gymnasts for Brazil
