= Kim Yoo-kyung =

South Korean rhythmic gymnast

- Alternative name: Kim Yu-Gyeong
- Born: October 1, 1975 (age 50)

Gymnastics career
- Discipline: Rhythmic gymnastics
- Country represented: South Korea

Kim Yoo-kyung (Korean: 김유경; born October 1, 1975) is a South Korean retired rhythmic gymnast.

She competed for South Korea in the rhythmic gymnastics all-around competition at the 1992 Olympic Games in Barcelona. She was 35th in the qualification and didn't qualify for the final.
