= Alexandro Viligiardi =

Italian gymnast

- Born: 25 July 1967 (age 59) Rome, Italy

Gymnastics career
- Discipline: Men's artistic gymnastics
- Country represented: Italy

Alexandro Viligiardi (born 25 July 1967) is an Italian gymnast. He competed in eight events at the 1992 Summer Olympics.

Later he became involved in sport aerobics and won the FISAF world championships title twice in 1996 and 1997.
