= Chong Gum =

North Korean rhythmic gymnast

- 정금
- Born: November 6, 1976 (age 49)

Gymnastics career
- Discipline: Rhythmic gymnastics
- Country represented: North Korea

Chong Gum (born November 6, 1976) is a retired North Korean rhythmic gymnast.

She competed for the Democratic People's Republic of Korea in the individual rhythmic gymnastics all-around competition at the 1992 Olympic Games in Barcelona. She was 27th in the qualification round and didn't advance to the final.
