= Anna Kimonos =

Cypriot rhythmic gymnast (born 1975)

- Born: 15 December 1975 (age 50)

Gymnastics career
- Discipline: Rhythmic gymnastics
- Country represented: Cyprus

Anna Kimonos (Greek: Αννα Κίμωνος; born 15 December 1975) is a retired Cypriot rhythmic gymnast.

She competed for Cyprus in the rhythmic gymnastics all-around competition at the 1992 Summer Olympics in Barcelona. She was 38th in the qualification round and did not advance to the final.
