= Carolina Pascual =

Spanish rhythmic gymnast

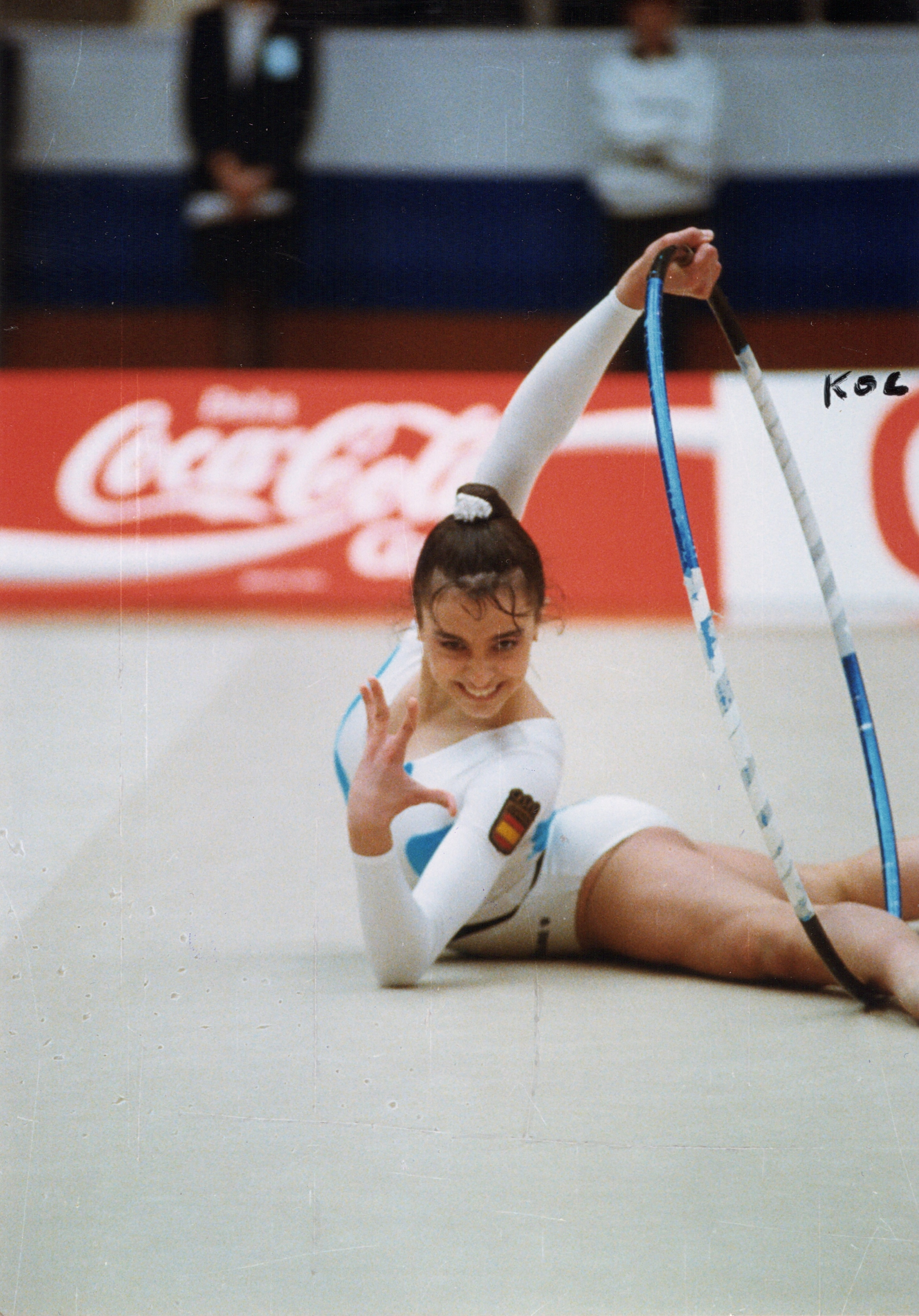

Personal information
- Full name: Carolina Pascual Gracia
- Born: 17 June 1976 (age 50) Orihuela, Alicante, Spain

Gymnastics career
- Discipline: Rhythmic gymnastics
- Country represented: Spain
- Head coach: Emilia Boneva
Medal record
Representing Spain
Olympic Games
Silver medal – second place	1992 Barcelona	All-around
World Championships
Silver medal – second place	1993 Alicante	Clubs
Bronze medal – third place	1991 Athens	Team
European Championships
Bronze medal – third place	1990 Gothenburg	Team
Bronze medal – third place	1992 Stuttgart	Team
European Cup Final
Silver medal – second place	1993 Málaga	Clubs
Bronze medal – third place	1993 Málaga	All-around
Bronze medal – third place	1993 Málaga	Ribbon

Carolina Pascual Gracia (Note: In this Spanish name, the first or paternal surname is Pascual and the second or maternal family name is Gracia.) (born 17 June 1976 in Orihuela, Alicante) is a former Spanish Individual Rhythmic Gymnast. She is the 1992 Olympics silver medalist and the 1993 European all-around bronze medalist.

== Career ==
Pascual was doing ballet when at age seven her ballet teacher told her mother that her daughter had excellent qualities for Rhythmic Gymnastics. There was not a club in her town so, her mother drove for around an hour to get Pascual to and from training sessions at the Escuela de Competición in Murcia. Pascual later went to the Atlético Montemar in Alicante.

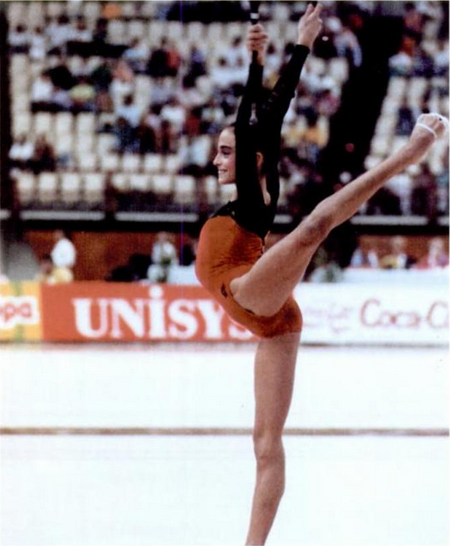
Pascual at the 1991 World Championships in Athens.

Pascual got her breakthrough in 1990 when Spain's head coach, Emilia Boneva, selected Pascual for the National Team. The newcomer was sent to the 1990 European Championships, where she helped the Spanish team win the bronze medal. She also placed 12th in the all-around and qualified for two event finals.

All the sacrifices that were made paid off when in 1990 Emilia Boneva selected her for the National Team. Pascual was one of Spain's most successful Rhythmic Gymnasts, and the first to get an Olympic medal. At the awards ceremony, bronze medalist Oksana Skaldina refused to acknowledge the podium results. Pascual is one of the few non-Eastern European rhythmic gymnasts to have successful career and medal at the Olympics.

An injured Pascual sat out at the 1992 World Championships, but came back for a bronze All-around medal at 1993 European Cup. But she struggled at the 1993 World Championships and finished 7th in All-around. Still, she would take silver with clubs behind teammate Carmen Acedo. She retired from the sport after the Alicante World Championships in 1993.

As a gymnast, she was recognized for technically demanding routines combining expressive movement and advanced back flexibility. She now coaches at Club IMD in Orihuela.
