= Elena Khatzisavva =

Cypriot rhythmic gymnast (born 1977)

- Born: 17 August 1977 (age 49)

Gymnastics career
- Discipline: Rhythmic gymnastics
- Country represented: Cyprus

Elena Khatzisavva (Greek: Ελενα Χατζησάββα, born 17 August 1977) is a retired Cypriot rhythmic gymnast.

She competed for Cyprus in the rhythmic gymnastics all-around competition at the 1992 Summer Olympics in Barcelona. She was 42nd in the qualification round and didn't advance to the final.
