= Federation of International Sports, Aerobics and Fitness =

The Federation of International Sports, Aerobics and Fitness (FISAF) is an international non-profit "umbrella organization" active in over 40 countries and was founded in 1990s. It is self-described as "the largest fitness industry organisation in the world" and "the largest instructor certification agency in the world". The FISAF International Training Course grants certificates of accreditation. Every year, over 20,000 fitness enthusiasts attend FISAF accredited courses and endorsed programs.

FISAF offers core courses in which participants can train to be aerobics instructors or personal trainers. They also offer workshops in other athletic and physical fitness-related activities such as on pilates, kick boxing, yoga, and power walking. Courses are offered for both children and adults.

Besides offering training and accreditation, the Federation of International Sports, Aerobics and Fitness hosts a variety of national-and international-level sports aerobics competitions leading up to an annual World Championship.

FISAF has its strongest presence in Europe, Asia and Oceania. Countries with affiliated organizations include Australia (the "Australian Fitness Network"), China (the "Physical Club"), Netherlands (the "Dutch Championships Aerobics Federation"), Switzerland (the "Swiss Academy of Fitness & Sports") and Finland ("Suomen Voimisteluliitto Svoli")

== World Championships ==
1993-1994: FISAF founded

FISAF European Sports Aerobics & Fitness Championships 2024

FISAF World Sports Aerobics & Fitness Championships 2024

HIP HOP UNITE World Championships (hip-hop championship it was renamed Hip Hop Unite)

Sport Aerobics and Fitness World Championships

European Championships

9th Sport Aerobics and Fitness World Championships 2007 - Serbia

10th Sport Aerobics and Fitness World Championships 2009 - France

== Members ==
https://www.fisafinternational.com/countries/ (March 2024)

27 Countries:

Asia (6): RUS-TPE-KOR-MAS-SIN-MDV

Pacific (2): AUS-NZL

Africa (3): MAR-RSA-CIV

Americas (4): MEX-BRA-BAR-TTO

Euro (12): DEN-NED-BEL-FRA-SUI-GER-POL-CZE-ITA-SVK-SRB-ROU

Past (1): IRI (2005-2011)
