= Areti Sinapidou =

Greek rhythmic gymnast (born 1976)

- Born: 27 October 1976 (age 49) Thessaloniki

Gymnastics career
- Discipline: Rhythmic gymnastics
- Country represented: Greece
- Club: Spartakos Association

Areti Sinapidou (Greek: Αρετή Σιναπίδου, born 27 October 1976, Thessaloniki) is a retired Greek rhythmic gymnast.

She competed for Greece in the rhythmic gymnastics all-around competition at the 1992 Summer Olympics in Barcelona. She was 12th in the qualification round and advanced to the final, placing 14th overall.
