= Irene Germini =

Italian rhythmic gymnast (born 1974)

- Born: 24 July 1974 (age 52) Legnano, Metropolitan City of Milan, Italy
- Height: 168 cm (5 ft 6 in)

Gymnastics career
- Discipline: Rhythmic gymnastics
- Country represented: Italy
- Club: Ginnastica Muggiò 75

Irene Germini (born 24 July 1974 in Legnano in the Metropolitan City of Milan) is a retired Italian rhythmic gymnast.

She competed for Italy in the rhythmic gymnastics all-around competition at two Olympic Games: in 1992 in Barcelona and in 1996 in Atlanta. In Barcelona she was 15th in the qualification and advanced to the final, placing 13th overall, in Atlanta she tied for 16th place in the qualification, was 13th in the semifinal and didn't advance to the final of 10 competitors.
