= Bai Mei (gymnast) =

Chinese rhythmic gymnast (born 1975)

- Born: January 8, 1975 (age 51) Shanxi, China
- Height: 166 cm (5 ft 5 in)

Gymnastics career
- Discipline: Rhythmic gymnastics
- Country represented: China

Bai Mei (Chinese: 白 梅, born January 8, 1975) is a Chinese retired rhythmic gymnast.

She competed for China in the rhythmic gymnastics all-around competition at the 1992 Summer Olympics in Barcelona. She tied for 29th place in the qualification round and didn't advance to the final.
