= Yun Byeong-hui =

South Korean rhythmic gymnast

Yun Byeong-Hee
- Alternative name: Yoon Byung-Hee
- Born: February 15, 1976 (age 50)

Gymnastics career
- Discipline: Rhythmic gymnastics
- Country represented: South Korea

Yun Byeong-Hui (Korean: 윤병희; born February 15, 1976) is a South Korean retired rhythmic gymnast.

She competed for South Korea in the rhythmic gymnastics all-around competition at the 1992 Olympic Games in Barcelona. She was 34th in the qualification and didn't qualify for the final.
