= Carmen Acedo =

Spanish rhythmic gymnast

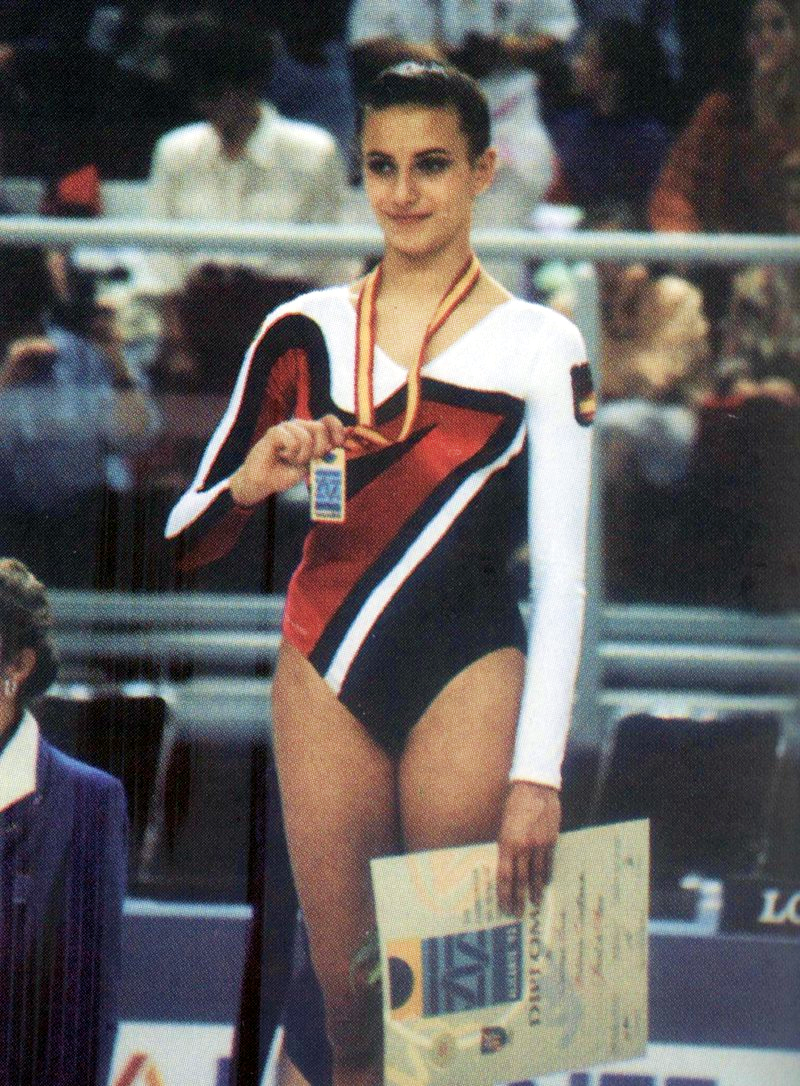

Personal information
- Full name: Carmen Acedo Jorge
- Born: 10 February 1975 (age 51) Lérida, Spain

Gymnastics career
- Discipline: Rhythmic gymnastics
- Country represented: Spain
Medal record
Rhythmic Gymnastics
Representing Spain
World Championships
Gold medal – first place	1993 Alicante	Clubs
Silver medal – second place	1992 Brussels	Ball
Bronze medal – third place	1991 Athens	Team
Bronze medal – third place	1992 Brussels	Clubs
European Championships
Bronze medal – third place	1992 Stuttgart	Team
European Cup Final
Bronze medal – third place	1993 Málaga	Ball
Bronze medal – third place	1993 Málaga	Clubs

Carmen Acedo Jorge (born 10 February 1975 in Lérida, Spain) is a retired individual rhythmic gymnast from Spain.

== Biography ==
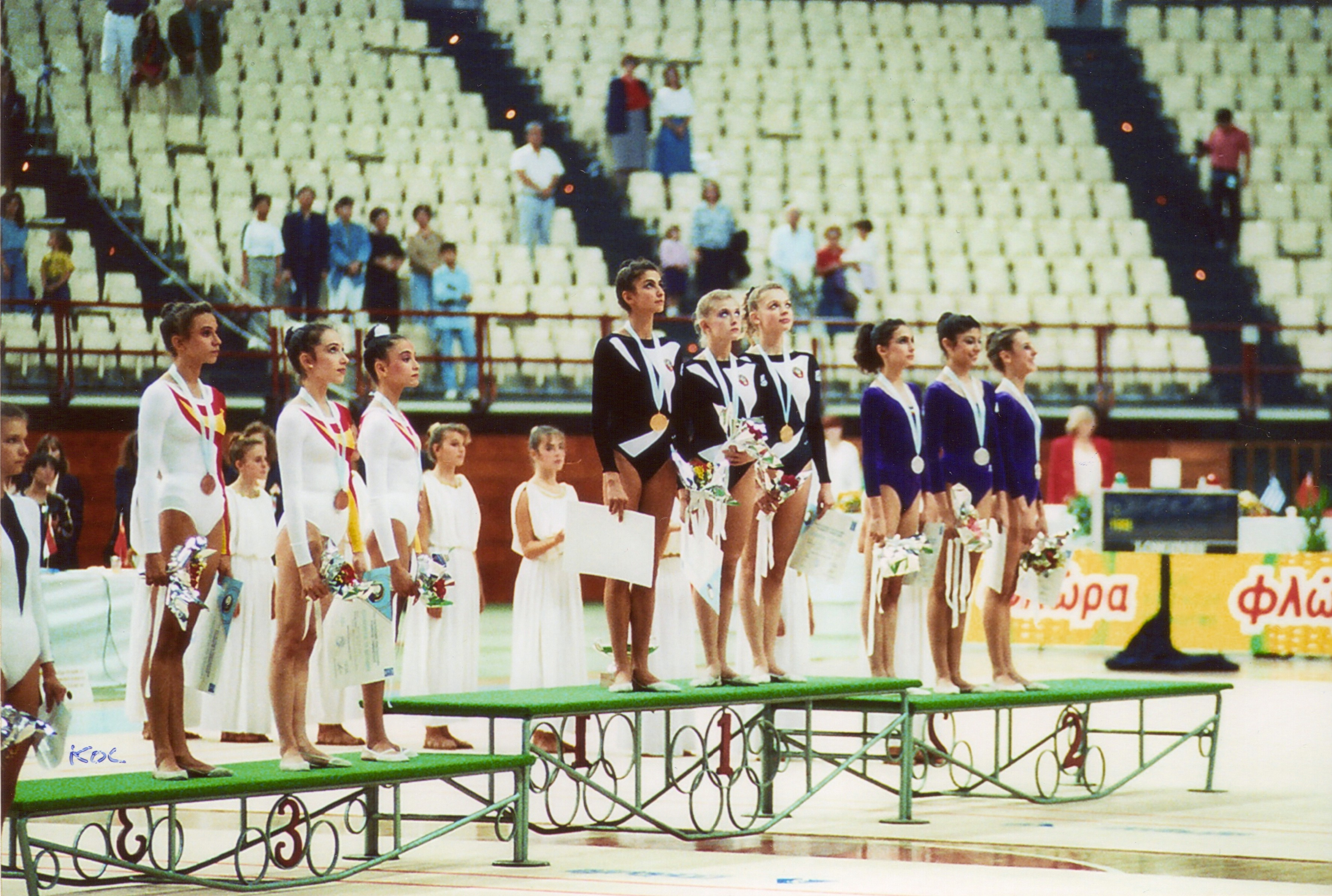
Acedo at the 1991 World Rhythmic Gymnastics Championships

Acedo competed at the 1992 Summer Olympics, where she finished off the podium in 4th place All-around behind teammate Carolina Pascual who won the silver medal.

She was married to Spanish race walker Jesús Ángel García Bragado.
