= Markus Müller (gymnast) =

Swiss gymnast

- Full name: Markus Paul Müller
- Born: 22 December 1966 (age 59)
- Height: 1.75 m (5 ft 9 in)

Gymnastics career
- Discipline: Men's artistic gymnastics
- Country represented: Switzerland
- Gym: Sport- und Turnverein Diepoldsau

Markus Paul Müller (born 22 December 1966) is a Swiss gymnast. He competed in eight events at the 1992 Summer Olympics.
