= Martin Modlitba =

Slovak gymnast (born 1970)

- Born: 12 January 1970 (age 56) Banská Bystrica, Czechoslovakia
- Height: 1.71 m (5 ft 7 in)

Gymnastics career
- Discipline: Men's artistic gymnastics
- Country represented: Czechoslovakia
- Club: Slávia Bratislava

Martin Modlitba (born 12 January 1970) is a Slovak gymnast. He competed in Gymnastics at the 1992 Summer Olympics at the 1992 Summer Olympics in Barcelona.
