= Samantha Ferrari =

Italian rhythmic gymnast (born 1973)

- Born: 25 September 1973 (age 52) Muggiò (near Milan), Italy

Gymnastics career
- Discipline: Rhythmic gymnastics
- Country represented: Italy
Medal record
Representing Italy
World Championships
Bronze medal – third place	1991 Athens	Clubs

Samantha Ferrari (born 25 September 1973 in Muggiò near Milan) is a retired Italian rhythmic gymnast.

She competed for Italy in the rhythmic gymnastics all-around competition at the 1992 Summer Olympics in Barcelona. She was 11th in the qualification and advanced to the final, placing 12th overall.
