= Jenifer Lovell =

American rhythmic gymnast

- Full name: Jenifer Ellen Lovell (-Moreno)
- Born: February 1, 1974 (age 52) Miami, Florida, United States
- Height: 172 cm (5 ft 8 in)

Gymnastics career
- Discipline: Rhythmic gymnastics
- Country represented: United States

Jenifer Ellen Lovell (-Moreno), more known as Jenifer Lovell, (born February 1, 1974, Miami, Florida) is a retired American rhythmic gymnast.

She competed for the United States of America in the individual rhythmic gymnastics all-around competition at the 1992 Olympic Games in Barcelona. She was 23rd in the qualification round and didn't advance to the final.
