= Christiane Klumpp =

German rhythmic gymnast

- Born: 22 November 1976 (age 49) Freudenstadt, West Germany
- Height: 1.64 m (5 ft 4 1/2 in)

Gymnastics career
- Discipline: Rhythmic gymnastics
- Country represented: Germany
- Club: TV Wattenscheid

Christiane Klumpp (now Wagner; born 22 November 1976 in Freudenstadt, West Germany) is a retired German rhythmic gymnast.

She competed for Germany in the rhythmic gymnastics all-around competition at the 1992 Summer Olympics in Barcelona, placing 10th overall. Later in the same year, in November, she was 8th in the individual all-around at the World Rhythmic Gymnastics Championships in Brussels.
