= Jana Šramková =

Czechoslovak rhythmic gymnast (born 1976)

- Born: 3 January 1976 (age 50) Brno, Czechoslovakia
- Height: 1.63 m (5 ft 4 in)

Gymnastics career
- Discipline: Rhythmic gymnastics
- Country represented: Czechoslovakia
- Club: Zetor Brno / Tesla Brno / Moravská Slávia Brno, Brno

Jana Šramková (born 3 January 1976, Brno, Czechoslovakia) is a retired Czech rhythmic gymnast. She competed for Czechoslovakia in the rhythmic gymnastics all-around competition at the 1992 Olympic Games in Barcelona. She was 13th in the qualification and advanced to the final, placing 16th overall.
