= Ancuța Goia =

Romanian rhythmic gymnast

- Full name: Ancuţa Elena Goia
- Born: 22 June 1976 (age 50)

Gymnastics career
- Discipline: Rhythmic gymnastics
- Country represented: Romania

Ancuța Goia (born 22 June 1976) is a retired Romanian rhythmic gymnast.

She competed for Romania in the rhythmic gymnastics all-around competition at the 1992 Olympic Games in Barcelona. She finished 16th in the qualification.
