= Alexandra Timoshenko =

Soviet rhythmic gymnast

Alexandra Timoshenko Олександра Тимошенко
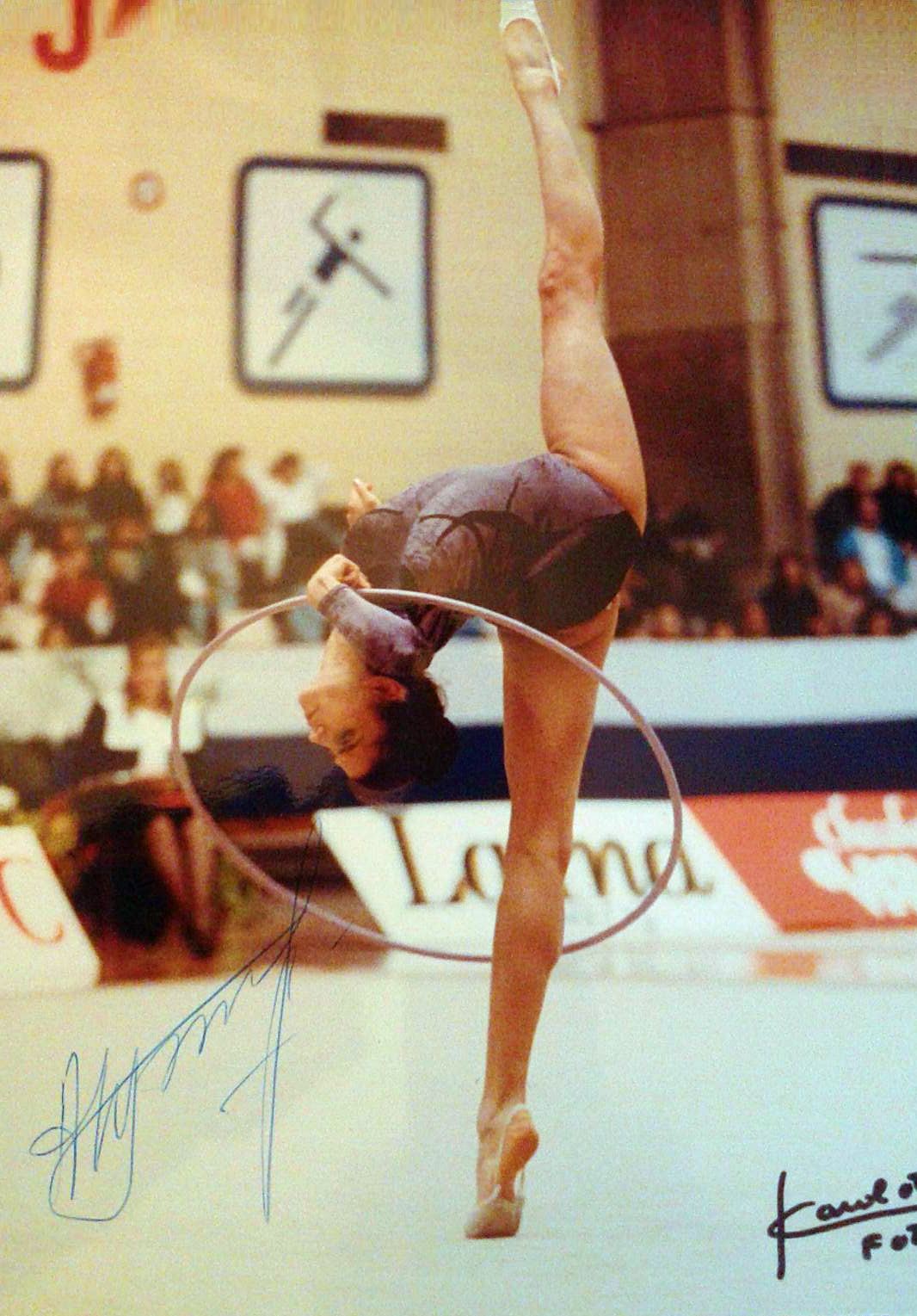
- Timoshenko in 1992

Personal information
- Alternative name: Olexandra Tymoshenko
- Born: 18 February 1972 (age 54) Bohuslav, Ukrainian SSR, Soviet Union

Gymnastics career
- Discipline: Rhythmic gymnastics
- Country represented: Unified Team
- Former countries represented: Ukraine; Soviet Union
- Club: Deriugins School
- Head coach: Albina Deriugina
- Assistant coach: Irina Deriugina
- Retired: yes
Medal record
Rhythmic Gymnastics
Olympic Games
Representing Unified Team
Gold medal – first place	1992 Barcelona	All-around
Representing Soviet Union
Bronze medal – third place	1988 Seoul	All-around
Representing Ukraine
European Championships
Gold medal – first place	1992 Stuttgart	Hoop
Gold medal – first place	1992 Stuttgart	Ball
Gold medal – first place	1992 Stuttgart	Clubs
Silver medal – second place	1992 Stuttgart	All-around
Silver medal – second place	1992 Stuttgart	Rope
Representing Soviet Union
World Championships
Gold medal – first place	1989 Sarajevo	All-around
Gold medal – first place	1989 Sarajevo	Rope
Gold medal – first place	1989 Sarajevo	Hoop
Gold medal – first place	1989 Sarajevo	Ball
Gold medal – first place	1989 Sarajevo	Team
Gold medal – first place	1991 Athens	Rope
Gold medal – first place	1991 Athens	Hoop
Gold medal – first place	1991 Athens	Ball
Gold medal – first place	1991 Athens	Clubs
Gold medal – first place	1991 Athens	Team
Silver medal – second place	1989 Sarajevo	Ribbon
Silver medal – second place	1991 Athens	All-around
European Championships
Gold medal – first place	1988 Helsinki	All-around
Gold medal – first place	1988 Helsinki	Rope
Gold medal – first place	1988 Helsinki	Hoop
Gold medal – first place	1988 Helsinki	Clubs
Gold medal – first place	1990 Gothenburg	Team
Gold medal – first place	1990 Gothenburg	All-around
Gold medal – first place	1990 Gothenburg	Ball
Silver medal – second place	1990 Gothenburg	Rope
Silver medal – second place	1990 Gothenburg	Hoop
European Cup Final
Gold medal – first place	1988 Hanover	All-around
Gold medal – first place	1988 Hanover	Ball
Gold medal – first place	1988 Hanover	Ribbon
Gold medal – first place	1991 Brussels	All-around
Gold medal – first place	1991 Brussels	Rope
Gold medal – first place	1991 Brussels	Hoop
Gold medal – first place	1991 Brussels	Ball
Gold medal – first place	1991 Brussels	Clubs
Silver medal – second place	1988 Hanover	Hoop
Bronze medal – third place	1988 Hanover	Rope
Junior European Championships
Gold medal – first place	1987 Athens	Rope
Silver medal – second place	1987 Athens	Hoop
Silver medal – second place	1987 Athens	Ribbon

Alexandra Alexandrovna Timoshenko, or Olexandra Olexandrivna Tymoshenko, (Ukrainian: Олександра Олександрівна Тимошенко; born 18 February 1972) is a former Ukrainian individual rhythmic gymnast who competed for the Soviet Union. She is the 1992 Olympics champion, 1988 Olympics bronze medalist, 1989 World all-around champion, 1991 World all-around silver medalist and two-time (1988, 1990) European all-around champion. Along with Tatiana Gutsu, and Oleh Kucherenko, Oleksandra Tymoshenko also was among the first Olympians in honor of which at the 1992 Olympics was raised the Ukrainian flag and played the Ukrainian anthem.

== Career ==
When Tymoshenko was seven, her father (a construction engineer) was invited to work in Kyiv. She started training in gymnastics in 1980 at age eight at the Deriugins School, coached by the mother/daughter combination of Albina and Irina Deriugina. She placed seventh at the 1987 European Junior Championships, her first major international result. At age 14, she became the Soviet junior champion and, shortly after, collected three medals at a European championships: a gold for the rope, a silver for the hoop and a bronze for the ribbon. At a Soviet competition, she placed second behind the top Soviet competition, Marina Lobach of Belarus, and so won the right to go to the 1988 European championships.

At the 1988 European Championships in Helsinki, Finland, Tymoshenko shared the All-Around title with two Bulgarians, Elizabeth Koleva and Adriana Dunavska. There she also won three golds, in hoop, clubs and rope. Several months later, she won the all-around bronze at the Seoul Olympics, and after that she became the USSR All-Around champion for the first time.

Tymoshenko continued her rise in 1989, taking five out of six golds at the Sarajevo World Championships. Her streak continued through numerous other international competitions, although she started to feel the pressure from up-and-coming teammates. She won her second European title in 1990, but spent the rest of the year struggling against the steadily rising Oksana Skaldina. In 1991, Timoshenko seemed poised to earn her second World title after a very strong early season. However, in Athens Timoshenko's difficulty level could not match Skaldina's and the former World champion had to settle for silver. At the event finals she was able to sweep the gold medals on all four apparatus.

The ex-USSR countries competed as the Unified Team at the 1992 Summer Olympics in Barcelona, Spain. Tymoshenko won the gold medal in All-around ahead of Skaldina.

== Retirement ==
Although the Ukrainian Federation tried to persuade her to continue after the 1992 Olympics, Timoshenko opted to retire from the sport at the age of 20. She enrolled in the Goethe Institute to study German language, while simultaneously completing her studies at the Kyiv University of Physical Culture and Sports. She spent some time coaching in Germany before getting married and making a permanent move to Vienna, Austria.

== Detailed Olympic results ==
Year	Competition description	Location	Music	Apparatus	Score-final
1992	Olympics	Barcelona		All-around	59.037
1992	Olympics	Barcelona		Prelim	19.487
1992	Olympics	Barcelona	Gori, Gori Moya Zvezda music from Russian Romance by Volodymyr Bystryakov	Rope	9.950
1992	Olympics	Barcelona	Main Title / Love Theme music from Wild Orchid by Simon Goldenberg & Geoff MacCormack	Hoop	9.950
1992	Olympics	Barcelona	I Spoved by Volodymyr Bystryakov	Ball	9.700
1992	Olympics	Barcelona	?	Clubs	9.950

Year	Competition description	Location	Music	Apparatus	Score-final
1988	Olympics	Seoul		All-around	59.875
1988	Olympics	Seoul		Prelim	19.875
1988	Olympics	Seoul	Leyenda (from Suite Española) by Isaac Manuel, Francisco Albaniz	Ribbon	10.000
1988	Olympics	Seoul	Summertime (from Porgy and Bess) by George Gershwin	Rope	10.000
1988	Olympics	Seoul	?	Ball	10.000
1988	Olympics	Seoul	Summertime (from Porgy and Bess) by George Gershwin	Clubs	10.000
