= Maria Sansaridou =

Greek rhythmic gymnast (born 1977)

- Born: 31 March 1977 (age 49) Thessaloniki

Gymnastics career
- Discipline: Rhythmic gymnastics
- Country represented: Greece
- Club: Diagoras Athletic Association
Medal record
Rhythmic Gymnastics
Representing Greece
Junior European Championships
Bronze medal – third place	1991 Lisbon	Ribbon

Maria Sansaridou (Greek: Μαρία Σανσαρίδου, born 31 March 1977, Thessaloniki) is a retired Greek rhythmic gymnast.

She competed for Greece in the rhythmic gymnastics all-around competition at the 1992 Summer Olympics in Barcelona. She was 10th in the qualification round and advanced to the final, placing 11th overall.
