= Joanna Bodak =

Polish rhythmic gymnast (born 1974)

- Born: 2 January 1974 (age 52) Grybów, Lesser Poland Voivodeship, Poland
- Height: 1.67 m (5 ft 5 1/2 in)

Gymnastics career
- Discipline: Rhythmic gymnastics
- Country represented: Poland
- Club: Pałac Młodzieży Gdynia

Joanna Bodak (born 2 January 1974 in Grybów, Lesser Poland Voivodeship) is a retired Polish rhythmic gymnast.

She competed for Poland in the rhythmic gymnastics all-around competition at the 1992 Olympic Games in Barcelona, placing 7th overall.
