= Hanna Laiho =

Finnish rhythmic gymnast

- Full name: Hanna Karolina Laiho
- Born: December 13, 1975 (age 50) Lahti, Päijät-Häme, Finland
- Height: 163 cm (5 ft 4 in)

Gymnastics career
- Discipline: Rhythmic gymnastics
- Country represented: Finland
- Club: Lahden Moderni Voimistelu

Hanna Karolina Laiho (born December 13, 1975, Lahti) is a retired Finnish rhythmic gymnast.

She competed for Finland in the individual rhythmic gymnastics all-around competition at the 1992 Summer Olympics in Barcelona. She tied for 25th place in the qualification round and didn't advance to the final.
