= Kristina Radonjić =

Serbian rhythmic gymnast

- Born: October 22, 1974 (age 51) Belgrade, Yugoslavia

Gymnastics career
- Discipline: Rhythmic gymnastics
- Country represented: Yugoslavia
- Head coach: Jasna Tomin
- Assistant coach: Mara Gojković
- Retired: 1996

Kristina Radonjić (Serbian: Кристина Радоњић) (October 22, 1974) is a Serbian rhythmic gymnast.

Radonjić started rhythmic gymnastics at the age of 8 and became a member of the Yugoslav national team in 1988. She won two consecutive junior national titles in Yugoslavia in 1988 and 1989 (all-around and four gold medals in the event finals). She holds five senior national titles (1991–95).

She was an all-around finalist at the European Rhythmic Gymnastics Championships in 1990 and at the World Rhythmic Gymnastics Championships in 1991, and qualified for the 1992 Summer Olympics in Barcelona.

At the age of 17, she competed as an Independent Olympic Participant at the 1992 Olympics. Due to the civil war in Yugoslavia, Yugoslav athletes were not allowed to compete in major international championships from 1993 to 1996.

Radonjić retired from rhythmic gymnastics in 1996, taking a silver medal at the National Cup.

She received a master's degree in management from the University of Belgrade.
