= Majda Milak =

Serbian rhythmic gymnast

- Born: 26 March 1977 (age 49)

Gymnastics career
- Discipline: Rhythmic gymnastics
- Country represented: Yugoslavia

Majda Milak (Serbian Cyrillic: Мајда Милак; born 26 March 1977) is a Serbian rhythmic gymnast. As a 15-year-old girl, she competed as an Independent Olympic Participant at the 1992 Summer Olympics in Barcelona.
