= Guo Shasha =

Chinese rhythmic gymnast

- Born: April 22, 1976 (age 50) Changsha, Hunan, China
- Height: 169 cm (5 ft 7 in)

Gymnastics career
- Discipline: Rhythmic gymnastics
- Country represented: China

Guo Shasha (Chinese: 郭 莎莎; born April 22, 1976) is a retired Chinese rhythmic gymnast.

She competed for China in the rhythmic gymnastics all-around competition at the 1992 Summer Olympics in Barcelona. She was 36th in the qualification round and didn't advance to the final.
