= List of gymnasts at the 1988 Summer Olympics =

This is a list of the gymnasts who represented their country at the 1988 Summer Olympics in Seoul from 17 September to 2 October 1988. Gymnasts across two disciplines (artistic gymnastics and rhythmic gymnastics) participated in the Games.

== Female artistic gymnasts ==
	Name	Country	Date of birth (Age)
Youngest competitor	Foteini Varvariotou	Greece	11 June 1974 (aged 14)
Oldest competitor	Manuela Hervás	Spain	1 August 1962 (aged 26)

NOC	Name	Date of birth (Age)	Hometown
Australia	Monique Allen	10 November 1971 (aged 16)	New South Wales, Australia
Australia	Leanne Rycroft	9 February 1969 (aged 19)	
Belgium	Mauricette Geller	28 March 1973 (aged 15)	Liège, Belgium
Brazil	Luísa Parente	1 February 1973 (aged 15)	Rio de Janeiro, Brazil
Bulgaria	Diana Dudeva	7 July 1968 (aged 20)	Pleven, Bulgaria
Bulgaria	Hrabrina Hrabrova	2 June 1973 (aged 15)	Varna, Bulgaria
Bulgaria	Maria Kartalova	26 June 1969 (aged 19)	Plovdiv, Bulgaria
Bulgaria	Ivelina Raikova	12 November 1971 (aged 16)	Belovets, Bulgaria
Bulgaria	Boriana Stoyanova	3 November 1969 (aged 18)	Sofia, Bulgaria
Bulgaria	Deliana Vodenicharova	19 October 1973 (aged 14)	Ruse, Bulgaria
Canada	Monica Covacci	8 December 1971 (aged 16)	Agincourt, Ontario
Canada	Cathy Giancaspro	23 November 1970 (aged 17)	Montreal, Quebec
Canada	Larissa Lowing	26 January 1973 (aged 15)	Scarborough, Ontario
Canada	Christina McDonald	13 October 1969 (aged 18)	Oshawa, Ontario
Canada	Janine Rankin	3 June 1972 (aged 16)	Weston, Ontario
Canada	Lori Strong	12 September 1972 (aged 16)	Scarborough, Ontario
China	Chen Cuiting	15 November 1972 (aged 15)	Changsha, Hunan
China	Fan Di	25 February 1973 (aged 15)	Changning, Shanghai
China	Ma Ying	18 June 1971 (aged 17)	Changsha, Hunan
China	Wang Huiying	23 February 1971 (aged 17)	Tianjin, China
China	Wang Wenjing	14 July 1973 (aged 15)	
China	Wang Xiaoyan	7 January 1968 (aged 20)	Changchun, Jilin
Czechoslovakia	Alena Dřevjaná	4 July 1969 (aged 19)	Opava, Czechoslovakia
Czechoslovakia	Ivona Krmelová	29 October 1969 (aged 18)	Bohumín, Czechoslovakia
Czechoslovakia	Iveta Poloková	17 August 1970 (aged 18)	Frýdek-Místek, Czechoslovakia
Czechoslovakia	Hana Říčná	20 December 1968 (aged 19)	Brno, Czechoslovakia
Czechoslovakia	Jana Vejrková	5 September 1967 (aged 21)	
Czechoslovakia	Martina Velíšková	16 April 1971 (aged 17)	
East Germany	Gabriele Fähnrich	8 April 1968 (aged 20)	Hoyerswerda, East Germany
East Germany	Martina Jentsch	22 March 1968 (aged 20)	Leipzig, East Germany
East Germany	Dagmar Kersten	28 October 1970 (aged 17)	Altdöbern, East Germany
East Germany	Ulrike Klotz	15 November 1970 (aged 17)	Cottbus, East Germany
East Germany	Bettina Schieferdecker	30 April 1968 (aged 20)	Markranstädt, East Germany
East Germany	Dörte Thümmler	29 October 1971 (aged 16)	Berlin, East Germany
France	Anne-Marie Bauduin	6 May 1972 (aged 16)	Saint-Lô, France
France	Karine Boucher	28 July 1972 (aged 16)	Orléans, France
France	Catherine Romano	9 May 1972 (aged 16)	Créteil, France
Great Britain	Karen Hargate	14 October 1972 (aged 15)	St. Andrews, Scotland
Great Britain	Karen Kennedy	4 December 1966 (aged 21)	Farnham, England
Greece	Foteini Varvariotou	11 June 1974 (aged 14)	Thessaloniki, Greece
Guatemala	María Flores-Wurmser	28 July 1971 (aged 17)	
Hungary	Zsuzsa Csisztu	15 February 1970 (aged 18)	Budapest, Hungary
Hungary	Andrea Ladányi	8 April 1969 (aged 19)	Budapest, Hungary
Hungary	Ágnes Miskó	1 October 1971 (aged 16)	Budapest, Hungary
Hungary	Zsuzsa Miskó	1 October 1971 (aged 16)	Budapest, Hungary
Hungary	Eszter Óváry	11 October 1972 (aged 15)	Budapest, Hungary
Hungary	Beáta Storczer	10 July 1969 (aged 19)	Budapest, Hungary
Israel	Revital Sharon	2 December 1970 (aged 17)	
Italy	Maria Cocuzza	23 July 1973 (aged 15)	Catania, Italy
Italy	Patrizia Luconi	24 October 1970 (aged 17)	Rimini, Italy
Italy	Giulia Volpi	30 January 1970 (aged 18)	Brescia, Italy
Japan	Mieko Mori	13 April 1966 (aged 22)	
Japan	Sachiko Morimura	28 January 1972 (aged 16)	
Japan	Maiko Morio	18 February 1967 (aged 21)	
Japan	Yuriko Nanahara	1 February 1972 (aged 16)	
Japan	Makiko Sanada	25 November 1972 (aged 15)	
Japan	Miho Shinoda	18 May 1972 (aged 16)	Tachikawa, Japan
Portugal	Sónia Moura	1 June 1972 (aged 16)	
Romania	Aurelia Dobre	6 November 1972 (aged 15)	Bucharest, Romania
Romania	Eugenia Golea	10 March 1971 (aged 17)	Bucharest, Romania
Romania	Celestina Popa	12 July 1970 (aged 18)	Ploiești, Romania
Romania	Gabriela Potorac	6 February 1973 (aged 15)	Bacău, Romania
Romania	Daniela Silivaș	9 May 1972 (aged 16)	Deva, Romania
Romania	Camelia Voinea	2 March 1970 (aged 18)	Constanța, Romania
South Korea	Bae Eun-mi	4 January 1973 (aged 15)	
South Korea	Han Kyung-im	19 September 1970 (aged 17)	
South Korea	Kim Eun-mi	7 September 1972 (aged 16)	
South Korea	Kim Nam-ok	3 November 1972 (aged 15)	
South Korea	Lim Hye-jin	3 June 1973 (aged 15)	
South Korea	Park Ji-suk	4 December 1972 (aged 15)	
Soviet Union	Svetlana Baitova	3 September 1972 (aged 16)	Mogilev, Byelorussian SSR
Soviet Union	Svetlana Boginskaya	9 February 1973 (aged 15)	Minsk, Byelorussian SSR
Soviet Union	Natalia Laschenova	16 September 1973 (aged 15)	Jelgava, Latvian SSR
Soviet Union	Elena Shevchenko	7 October 1971 (aged 16)	Moscow, Russian SFSR
Soviet Union	Elena Shushunova	23 May 1969 (aged 19)	Saint Petersburg, Russian SFSR
Soviet Union	Olga Strazheva	12 November 1972 (aged 15)	Zaporizhzhia, Ukrainian SSR
Spain	Nuria Belchi	10 July 1973 (aged 15)	Barcelona, Spain
Spain	Lidia Castillejo	4 September 1969 (aged 19)	Barcelona, Spain
Spain	Nuria García	13 March 1973 (aged 15)	Madrid, Spain
Spain	Manuela Hervás	1 August 1962 (aged 26)	Madrid, Spain
Spain	Laura Muñoz	9 June 1970 (aged 18)	Madrid, Spain
Spain	Eva Rueda	13 September 1971 (aged 17)	Madrid, Spain
United States	Kelly Garrison	5 July 1967 (aged 21)	Altus, Oklahoma
United States	Brandy Johnson	30 April 1973 (aged 15)	Tallahassee, Florida
United States	Missy Marlowe	25 August 1971 (aged 17)	Salt Lake City, Utah
United States	Phoebe Mills	2 November 1972 (aged 15)	Highland Park, Illinois
United States	Hope Spivey	27 July 1971 (aged 17)	Norfolk, Virginia
United States	Chelle Stack	23 July 1973 (aged 15)	Endicott, New York
West Germany	Michaela Ustorf	4 October 1972 (aged 15)	Kaufbeuren, West Germany
West Germany	Isabella von Lospichl	28 August 1970 (aged 18)	Starnberg, West Germany

== Male artistic gymnasts ==
	Name	Country	Date of birth (Age)
Youngest competitor	Sergey Kharkov	Soviet Union	17 November 1970 (aged 17)
Oldest competitor	Jenő Paprika	Hungary	5 January 1960 (aged 28)

NOC	Name	Date of birth (Age)	Hometown
Australia	Kenneth Meredith	22 January 1963 (aged 25)	
Brazil	Gil Pinto	1 December 1965 (aged 22)	São Paulo, Brazil
Bulgaria	Petar Georgiev	29 January 1965 (aged 23)	Sofia, Bulgaria
Bulgaria	Stoyko Gochev	12 January 1965 (aged 23)	Chirpan, Bulgaria
Bulgaria	Lubomir Geraskov	27 December 1968 (aged 19)	Sofia, Bulgaria
Bulgaria	Kalofer Hristozov	19 March 1969 (aged 19)	Plovdiv, Bulgaria
Bulgaria	Deyan Kolev	18 December 1965 (aged 22)	Targovishte, Bulgaria
Bulgaria	Dimitar Taskov	6 June 1967 (aged 21)	Bansko, Bulgaria
Canada	Lorne Bobkin	30 October 1965 (aged 22)	Toronto, Ontario
Canada	Philippe Chartrand	23 December 1963 (aged 24)	Laval, Quebec
Canada	Curtis Hibbert	2 September 1966 (aged 22)	Kingston, Jamaica
Canada	Alan Nolet	17 December 1967 (aged 20)	Toronto, Ontario
Canada	Brad Peters	2 December 1962 (aged 25)	Hamilton, Ontario
Canada	James Rozon	31 December 1963 (aged 24)	Saskatoon, Saskatchewan
China	Guo Linxian	7 September 1965 (aged 23)	
China	Li Chunyang	2 February 1968 (aged 20)	Shantou, Guangdong
China	Li Ning	10 March 1963 (aged 25)	Laibin, Guangxi
China	Lou Yun	23 June 1964 (aged 24)	Hangzhou, Zhejiang
China	Wang Chongsheng	22 September 1966 (aged 21)	Haikou, Hainan
China	Xu Zhiqiang	4 March 1963 (aged 25)	
Chinese Taipei	Chang Chao-Chun	1 December 1966 (aged 21)	
East Germany	Holger Behrendt	29 January 1964 (aged 24)	Schönebeck, East Germany
East Germany	Ralf Büchner	31 August 1967 (aged 21)	Berlin, East Germany
East Germany	Ulf Hoffmann	8 September 1961 (aged 27)	Neustrelitz, East Germany
East Germany	Sylvio Kroll	29 April 1965 (aged 23)	Lübben, East Germany
East Germany	Sven Tippelt	3 June 1965 (aged 23)	Leipzig, East Germany
East Germany	Andreas Wecker	2 January 1970 (aged 18)	Staßfurt, East Germany
France	Claude Carmona	3 January 1964 (aged 24)	Auch, France
France	Stéphane Cauterman	26 December 1968 (aged 19)	Roubaix, France
France	Christian Chevalier	18 December 1966 (aged 21)	Orthez, France
France	Frédéric Longuépée	3 November 1965 (aged 22)	Lille, France
France	Patrick Mattioni	18 October 1966 (aged 21)	Paris, France
France	Thierry Pecqueux	12 January 1965 (aged 23)	Nevers, France
Great Britain	Terry Bartlett	2 December 1963 (aged 24)	Southampton, England
Great Britain	Andrew Morris	30 November 1961 (aged 26)	Swansea, Wales
Hungary	Zsolt Borkai	31 August 1965 (aged 23)	Győr, Hungary
Hungary	Csaba Fajkusz	13 September 1967 (aged 21)	Győr, Hungary
Hungary	György Guczoghy	3 March 1962 (aged 26)	Budapest, Hungary
Hungary	Zsolt Horváth	18 August 1968 (aged 20)	Budapest, Hungary
Hungary	Jenő Paprika	5 January 1960 (aged 28)	Kiskunhalas, Hungary
Hungary	Balázs Tóth	6 January 1967 (aged 21)	Budapest, Hungary
Italy	Vittorio Allievi	10 December 1962 (aged 25)	Seregno, Italy
Italy	Paolo Bucci	23 July 1968 (aged 20)	Milan, Italy
Italy	Jury Chechi	11 October 1969 (aged 18)	Prato, Italy
Italy	Boris Preti	6 February 1968 (aged 20)	Gallarate, Italy
Italy	Gabriele Sala	27 September 1967 (aged 20)	Brescia, Italy
Italy	Riccardo Trapella	14 February 1968 (aged 20)	Aarau, Switzerland
Japan	Yukio Iketani	26 September 1970 (aged 17)	Tokyo, Japan
Japan	Hiroyuki Konishi	14 August 1963 (aged 25)	Tokyo, Japan
Japan	Koichi Mizushima	1 August 1965 (aged 23)	Tsuyama, Japan
Japan	Daisuke Nishikawa	2 June 1970 (aged 18)	Osaka, Japan
Japan	Toshiharu Sato	19 March 1969 (aged 19)	Osaka, Japan
Japan	Takahiro Yamada	9 June 1964 (aged 24)	Tokushima Prefecture, Japan
Mexico	Tony Piñeda	5 January 1964 (aged 24)	
Portugal	Hélder Pinheiro	25 November 1969 (aged 18)	
Romania	Nicolae Bejenaru	30 May 1968 (aged 20)	Bucharest, Romania
Romania	Marius Gherman	14 July 1967 (aged 21)	Sibiu, Romania
Romania	Valentin Pîntea	19 April 1962 (aged 26)	Lugoj, Romania
Romania	Marian Rizan	29 October 1966 (aged 21)	Craiova, Romania
Romania	Adrian Sandu	19 October 1966 (aged 21)	Sibiu, Romania
Romania	Marius Tobă	9 January 1968 (aged 20)	Reșița, Romania
South Korea	Ju Yeong-sam	25 March 1966 (aged 22)	
South Korea	Park Jong-hoon	6 May 1965 (aged 23)	
South Korea	Song Yu-jin	25 January 1967 (aged 21)	
Soviet Union	Vladimir Artemov	7 December 1964 (aged 23)	Vladimir, Russian SFSR
Soviet Union	Dmitri Bilozertchev	22 December 1966 (aged 21)	Moscow, Russian SFSR
Soviet Union	Lado Gogoladze	13 August 1966 (aged 22)	Tbilisi, Georgian SSR
Soviet Union	Sergey Kharkov	17 November 1970 (aged 17)	Moscow, Russian SFSR
Soviet Union	Valeri Liukin	17 November 1966 (aged 21)	Aktobe, Kazakh SSR
Soviet Union	Vladimir Novikov	4 August 1970 (aged 18)	Almaty, Kazakh SSR
Spain	Álvaro Montesinos	24 September 1963 (aged 24)	Torrent, Spain
Spain	Alfonso Rodríguez	23 December 1965 (aged 22)	Madrid, Spain
Spain	Miguel Ángel Rubio	20 August 1966 (aged 22)	Barcelona, Spain
Sweden	Johan Jonasson	9 October 1966 (aged 21)	Stockholm, Sweden
Switzerland	Bruno Cavelti	21 January 1961 (aged 27)	
Switzerland	Josef Zellweger	19 September 1963 (aged 24)	
United States	Kevin Davis	29 July 1966 (aged 22)	Charleston, South Carolina
United States	Scott Johnson	12 July 1961 (aged 27)	Cincinnati, Ohio
United States	Charles Lakes	6 August 1964 (aged 24)	St. Louis, Missouri
United States	Dominick Minicucci	10 January 1969 (aged 19)	Staten Island, New York
United States	Lance Ringnald	13 June 1970 (aged 18)	Des Moines, Iowa
United States	Wes Suter	23 May 1964 (aged 24)	Philadelphia, Pennsylvania
West Germany	Andreas Aguilar	26 January 1962 (aged 26)	Barcelona, Spain
West Germany	Mike Beckmann	27 October 1967 (aged 20)	Gevelsberg, West Germany
West Germany	Jürgen Brümmer	8 December 1964 (aged 23)	Stuttgart, West Germany
West Germany	Ralph Kern	24 February 1967 (aged 21)	Heilbronn, West Germany
West Germany	Bernhard Simmelbauer	20 June 1963 (aged 25)	Mühldorf, West Germany
West Germany	Daniel Winkler	17 May 1962 (aged 26)	Darmstadt, West Germany
Yugoslavia	Jože Kolman	5 February 1967 (aged 21)	Ljubljana, Yugoslavia

== Rhythmic gymnasts ==
	Name	Country	Date of birth (Age)
Youngest competitor	Mary Fuzesi	Canada	21 February 1974 (aged 14)
Oldest competitor	Giulia Staccioli	Italy	6 June 1964 (aged 24)

NOC	Name	Date of birth (Age)	Hometown
Austria	Elisabeth Bergmann	20 November 1970 (aged 17)	Vienna, Austria
Belgium	Laurence Brihaye	2 September 1969 (aged 19)	Saint-Josse-ten-Noode, Belgium
Bulgaria	Adriana Dunavska	21 April 1969 (aged 19)	Sofia, Bulgaria
Bulgaria	Bianka Panova	27 May 1970 (aged 18)	Sofia, Bulgaria
Canada	Mary Fuzesi	21 February 1974 (aged 14)	Budapest, Hungary
Canada	Lise Gautreau	29 April 1967 (aged 21)	Moncton, New Brunswick
China	He Xiaomin	8 July 1971 (aged 17)	
China	Pang Qiong	1 October 1970 (aged 17)	
Czechoslovakia	Lenka Oulehlová	14 June 1973 (aged 15)	Brno, Czechoslovakia
Czechoslovakia	Denisa Sokolovská	27 May 1971 (aged 17)	Jaroměř, Czechoslovakia
Denmark	Malene Franzen	28 September 1970 (aged 17)	Kastrup, Denmark
France	Stéphanie Cottel	17 February 1972 (aged 16)	Charens, France
Great Britain	Lisa Black	3 June 1967 (aged 21)	
Greece	Maria Alevizou	15 November 1968 (aged 19)	Kalamata, Greece
Greece	Panagiota Tsitsela	1 August 1972 (aged 16)	
Hungary	Nóra Érfalvy	6 June 1970 (aged 18)	Budapest, Hungary
Hungary	Andrea Sinkó	14 February 1967 (aged 21)	Budapest, Hungary
Israel	Shulamit Goldstein	4 May 1968 (aged 20)	
Israel	Rakefet Remigolski	8 December 1971 (aged 16)	
Italy	Micaela Imperatori	28 April 1972 (aged 16)	Rome, Italy
Italy	Giulia Staccioli	6 June 1964 (aged 24)	Cagliari, Italy
Japan	Erika Akiyama	31 December 1964 (aged 23)	Fukuoka Prefecture, Japan
Japan	Hiroko Otsuka	8 March 1967 (aged 21)	Ehime Prefecture, Japan
New Zealand	Angela Walker	19 March 1967 (aged 21)	Auckland, New Zealand
Poland	Eliza Białkowska	19 July 1973 (aged 15)	Skwierzyna, Poland
Poland	Teresa Folga	15 October 1966 (aged 21)	Kraków, Poland
Portugal	Patrícia Jorge	17 May 1970 (aged 18)	
South Korea	Hong Seong-hui	9 July 1969 (aged 19)	
South Korea	Kim In-hwa	5 October 1969 (aged 18)	
Soviet Union	Marina Lobatch	26 June 1970 (aged 18)	Smolevichi, Byelorussian SSR
Soviet Union	Aleksandra Timoshenko	18 February 1972 (aged 16)	Bohuslav, Ukrainian SSR
Spain	María Isabel Lloret	4 June 1971 (aged 17)	Villajoyosa, Spain
Spain	María Martín	26 May 1970 (aged 18)	León, Spain
United States	Michelle Berube	1 March 1966 (aged 22)	Detroit, Michigan
United States	Diane Simpson	7 April 1969 (aged 19)	Evanston, Illinois
West Germany	Marion Rothhaar	18 December 1972 (aged 15)	Zweibrücken, West Germany
West Germany	Diana Schmiemann	2 March 1972 (aged 16)	Wickede, West Germany
Yugoslavia	Milena Reljin	25 May 1967 (aged 21)	Belgrade, Yugoslavia
Yugoslavia	Dara Terzić	22 December 1970 (aged 17)	
