= 1987 World Rhythmic Gymnastics Championships =

International gymnastics tournament

- Location: Varna, Bulgaria
- Start date: 17 September 1987
- End date: 20 September 1987

1987 World Rhythmic Gymnastics Championships were held in Varna, Bulgaria on September 17–20, 1987.

The World Championships were a qualifying event for the 1988 Summer Olympics. The top 50 gymnasts in the all-around won an Olympic quota for their country, up to two per country.

Bulgaria dominated the competition; the individual all-around winner, Bianka Panova, received a perfect 10.0 score on every routine and won all four apparatus finals as well (though with ties with different gymnasts on each event). She was the first gymnast to win all five individual medals at the Rhythmic Gymnastics World Championships. The two tied silver medalists, Adriana Dunavska and Elizabeth Koleva, were also Bulgarian. Bulgaria also won the group competition and both routine finals, receiving a perfect 20.0 score for most of their routines and one 19.900.

The competition was the first World Championships where groups were required to compete two different routines. Video replay was used by the judges more frequently than in the past. Nora Hitzel, the head of the United States rhythmic gymnastics program, noted changes in difficulty and style in routines performed at the competition, with more use of the feet to manipulate the hoop, more bouncing and rolling of the clubs, and better jumping and skipping in rope routines.

== Participants ==
The following countries sent competitors: Argentina, Australia, Austria, Belgium, Brazil, Bulgaria, Canada, China, Cuba, Czechoslovakia, Denmark, Finland, France, Greece, Hungary, Israel, Italy, Japan, Mexico, the Netherlands, New Zealand, North Korea, Norway, Poland, Portugal, Romania, South Korea, Spain, Sweden, Switzerland, Chinese Taipei, the United Kingdom, the United States, the USSR, West Germany, and Yugoslavia.

=== Individual ===
| Nation | Name | Nation | Name | Nation | Name | Nation | Name |
|---|---|---|---|---|---|---|---|
| Argentina | Paula Paradelas | Denmark | Malene Franzen | Netherlands | Linda Oers | Sweden | Eva Lundovist |
| Australia | Antonietta Guida | Denmark | Susanne Ravn | Netherlands | Mirjam de Kramer | Sweden | Sofia Hedman |
| Australia | Nicole Mozes | Finland | Leena Murtamo | Netherlands | Natascha Vervoort | Sweden | Viktoria Bengtsson |
| Austria | Elisabeth Bergmann | Finland | Marika Kosonen | Norway | Ann Kristin Albertsen | Switzerland | Caroline Müller |
| Belgium | Annik Vanderstraeten | Finland | Mira Luhtanen | Norway | Victoria Ystborg | Switzerland | Maura Genasci |
| Belgium | Caroline Verbruggen | France | Annette Walle | Norway | Ylje Wiede | Switzerland | Sabrina Muheim |
| Belgium | Laurence Brihaye | France | Claudia Bouabca | North Korea | Ok Sun Djang | Chinese Taipei for Olympic games | Chih-Yuan Yan |
| Brazil | Francoise Biot | France | Emmanuelle Serre | North Korea | Suk Yong Li | Chinese Taipei for Olympic games | Huei-Mei Lee |
| Brazil | Jaqueline Pedreira | Greece | Jota Tsitsela | New Zealand | Angela Walker | Chinese Taipei for Olympic games | Hui-Huang Tsai |
| Brazil | Rosane Favila Ferreira | Greece | Maggy Michailidou | New Zealand | Katherine Agnew | United Kingdom | Lisa Black |
| Bulgaria | Adriana Dunavska | Greece | Maria Alevizou | New Zealand | Melanie Cairns | United Kingdom | Nicola Walker |
| Bulgaria | Elizabeth Koleva | Hungary | Andrea Sinko | Poland | Eliza Bialkowska | United Kingdom | Viva Seifert |
| Bulgaria | Bianka Panova | Hungary | Nora Erfalvi | Poland | Izabela Zuravska | United States | Dacon Lister |
| Canada | Jennefer Hopkins | Hungary | Zsuzsana Muszil | Poland | Teresa Folga | United States | Diane Simpson |
| Canada | Lisa Merritt | Israel | Einat Argaman | Portugal | Lourdes Silva | United States | Irina Rubinstein |
| Canada | Lise Gatreau | Israel | Rakefet Ramigolski | Portugal | Margarida Carmo | Soviet Union | Anna Kotchneva |
| People's Republic of China | Pang Qiong | Israel | Shulamit Goldstein | Portugal | Patricia Jorge | Soviet Union | Marina Lobatch |
| People's Republic of China | He Xiaomin | Italy | Barbara Ferrari | Romania | Adriana Stonescu | Soviet Union | Tatiana Druchinina |
| People's Republic of China | Yanfei Xia | Italy | Micaela Imperatori | Romania | Florentina Butaru | Germany | Diana Schmiemann |
| Cuba | Lourdes Medina | Italy | Simona Brusa | Romania | Petruta Dumitrescu | Germany | Marion Rothaar |
| Cuba | Sandra Arregoitia | Japan | Akemi Fujino | South Korea | In-Wha Kim | Germany | Regina Weber |
| Cuba | Thalia Fung | Japan | Erika Akiyama | South Korea | Soo-Yung Kim | SFR Yugoslavia | Dara Terzić |
| Czechoslovakia | Andrea Koppová | Japan | Hiroko Otsuka | South Korea | Sung-Hee Hong | SFR Yugoslavia | Dominika Kacin |
| Czechoslovakia | Denisa Sokolovská | Mexico | Diana Velarde | Spain | Maria Isabel Lloret | SFR Yugoslavia | Milena Reljin |
| Czechoslovakia | Lenka Oulehlová | Mexico | Mariela Castillo | Spain | María Martín | | |
| Denmark | Ana-Katrine Korning | Mexico | Miriam Hinojosa | Spain | Monserrat Manzanares | | |

=== Groups ===
Countries who participated in the group competition are as follows.

| Flag | Nation | Flag | Nation | Flag | Nation | Flag | Nation |
|---|---|---|---|---|---|---|---|
| | Austria | | Czechoslovakia | | Japan | | Spain |
| | Brazil | | Finland | | The Netherlands | | Switzerland |
| | Bulgaria | | France | | North Korea | | The United States |
| | Canada | | Hungary | | Norway | Soviet Union | USSR |
| People's Republic of China | China | | Italy | | New Zealand | | West Germany |

== Medal table ==
| Place | Country | Gold | Silver | Bronze | Total |
|---|---|---|---|---|---|
| 1 | Bulgaria | 9 | 2 | 1 | 12 |
| 2 | USSR | 3 | 2 | 4 | 9 |
| 3 | China | 0 | 1 | 2 | 3 |
| 4 | Spain | 0 | 0 | 2 | 2 |

== Individual Final ==
=== Individual All-Around ===
| Place | Nation | Name | Rope | Hoop | Clubs | Ribbon | Total |
|---|---|---|---|---|---|---|---|
| 1 | Bulgaria | Bianka Panova | 10.000 | 10.000 | 10.000 | 10.000 | 40.000 |
| 2 | Bulgaria | Adriana Dunavska | 10.000 | 10.000 | 9.900 | 9.900 | 39.800 |
| 2 | Bulgaria | Elizabeth Koleva | 9.950 | 9.850 | 10.000 | 10.000 | 39.800 |
| 4 | Soviet Union | Anna Kotchneva | 9.900 | 10.000 | 10.00 | 9.750 | 39.650 |
| 4 | Soviet Union | Marina Lobatch | 9.900 | 10.000 | 9.950 | 9.800 | 39.650 |
| 6 | Soviet Union | Tatiana Druchinina | 9.900 | 9.950 | 9.700 | 10.000 | 39.550 |
| 7 | Romania | Florentina Butaru | 9.800 | 9.700 | 9.550 | 9.800 | 38.850 |
| 8 | SFR Yugoslavia | Milena Reljin | 9.800 | 9.650 | 9.700 | 9.650 | 38.800 |
| 9 | Spain | Maria Isabel Lloret | 9.700 | 9.650 | 9.700 | 9.700 | 38.750 |
| 9 | Hungary | Andrea Sinko | 9.700 | 9.700 | 9.650 | 9.700 | 38.750 |
| 11 | Romania | Adriana Stonescu | 9.700 | 9.650 | 9.700 | 9.650 | 38.700 |
| 12 | Germany | Regina Weber | 9.700 | 9.700 | 9.650 | 9.600 | 38.650 |
| 13 | Czechoslovakia | Denisa Sokolovská | 9.600 | 9.700 | 9.600 | 9.550 | 38.450 |
| 14 | Poland | Izabela Zuravska | 9.650 | 9.650 | 9.500 | 9.600 | 38.400 |
| 15 | Poland | Teresa Folga | 9.450 | 9.700 | 9.600 | 9.600 | 38.350 |
| 16 | Japan | Erika Akiyama | 9.400 | 9.700 | 9.600 | 9.550 | 38.250 |
| 16 | Hungary | Zsuzsana Muszil | 9.450 | 9.700 | 9.600 | 9.500 | 38.250 |
| 18 | Spain | Maria Martin | 9.600 | 9.500 | 9.600 | 9.500 | 38.200 |
| 18 | North Korea | Suk Yong Li | 9.200 | 9.700 | 9.600 | 9.700 | 38.200 |
| 20 | Italy | Micaela Imperatori | 9.550 | 9.600 | 9.500 | 9.450 | 38.100 |
| 21 | People's Republic of China | Xiaomin He | 9.600 | 9.550 | 9.400 | 9.500 | 38.050 |
| 22 | Poland | Eliza Bialkowska | 9.450 | 9.550 | 9.500 | 9.500 | 38.000 |
| 22 | Germany | Diana Schmiemann | 9.600 | 9.500 | 9.550 | 9.350 | 38.000 |
| 22 | United States | Diane Simpson | 9.600 | 9.600 | 9.450 | 9.350 | 38.000 |
| 25 | Czechoslovakia | Andrea Koppová | 9.500 | 9.600 | 9.450 | 9.400 | 37.950 |
| 25 | People's Republic of China | Qiong Pang | 9.600 | 9.450 | 9.600 | 9.300 | 37.950 |
| 27 | Romania | Petruta Dumitrescu | 9.300 | 9.500 | 9.500 | 9.550 | 37.850 |
| 28 | Italy | Simona Brusa | 9.400 | 9.350 | 9.500 | 9.550 | 37.800 |
| 28 | Spain | Monserrat Manzanares | 9.450 | 9.600 | 9.650 | 9.100 | 37.800 |
| 30 | Czechoslovakia | Lenka Oulehlová | 9.500 | 9.450 | 9.400 | 9.400 | 37.750 |
| 31 | People's Republic of China | Yanfei Xia | 9.550 | 9.450 | 9.300 | 9.400 | 37.700 |
| 32 | Italy | Barbara Ferrari | 9.400 | 9.450 | 9.400 | 9.400 | 37.650 |
| 32 | Canada | Lisa Merritt | 9.450 | 9.450 | 9.450 | 9.300 | 37.650 |
| 34 | Hungary | Nora Erfalvi | 9.400 | 9.400 | 9.400 | 9.400 | 37.600 |
| 34 | Germany | Marion Rothhaar | 9.300 | 9.500 | 9.400 | 9.400 | 37.600 |
| 36 | Cuba | Lourdes Medina | 9.500 | 9.300 | 9.050 | 9.550 | 37.400 |
| 36 | North Korea | Ok Sun Djang | 9.450 | 9.550 | 9.400 | 9.000 | 37.400 |
| 38 | United States | Dacon Lister | 9.450 | 9.350 | 9.200 | 9.350 | 37.350 |
| 39 | Japan | Akemi Fujino | 9.400 | 9.300 | 9.400 | 9.150 | 37.35 |
| 40 | Greece | Maria Alevizou | 9.400 | 9.200 | 9.250 | 9.150 | 37.000 |
| 40 | Cuba | Thalia Fung | 9.300 | 9.300 | 9.200 | 9.200 | 37.000 |
| 40 | Greece | Jota Tsitsela | 9.200 | 9.300 | 9.200 | 9.300 | 37.000 |
| 43 | Japan | Hiroko Oisuka | 9.300 | 9.000 | 9.250 | 9.300 | 36.850 |
| 43 | Norway | Victoria Ystborg | 9.100 | 9.300 | 9.200 | 9.250 | 36.850 |
| 45 | South Korea | Sung-Hee Hong | 9.150 | 9.300 | 9.000 | 9.300 | 36.750 |
| 46 | United States | Irina Rubinstein | 9.200 | 9.250 | 9.200 | 9.000 | 36.650 |
| 46 | SFR Yugoslavia | Dara Terzić | 9.200 | 9.200 | 9.300 | 8.950 | 36.650 |
| 48 | Greece | Maggy Michailidou | 9.350 | 9.100 | 8.950 | 9.200 | 36.600 |
| 49 | France | Claudia Bouabca | 9.200 | 9.100 | 9.100 | 9.150 | 36.550 |
| 49 | Denmark | Malene Franzen | 9.150 | 9.200 | 9.000 | 9.200 | 36.550 |
| 49 | France | Annette Walle | 9.150 | 9.150 | 9.050 | 9.200 | 36.550 |
| 52 | Austria | Elisabeth Bergmann | 9.150 | 9.200 | 8.850 | 9.300 | 36.500 |
| 52 | SFR Yugoslavia | Dominika Kacin | 9.300 | 9.200 | 8.800 | 9.200 | 36.500 |
| 54 | Sweden | Viktoria Bengtsson | 9.100 | 9.400 | 8.800 | 9.150 | 36.450 |
| 54 | South Korea | In-Wha Kim | 8.900 | 9.300 | 9.000 | 9.250 | 36.450 |
| 56 | Cuba | Sandra Arregoitia | 9.250 | 9.000 | 8.750 | 9.400 | 36.400 |
| 57 | New Zealand | Angela Walker | 8.850 | 9.250 | 9.200 | 9.050 | 36.350 |
| 58 | Netherlands | Natascha Vervoort | 9.200 | 9.300 | 8.850 | 8.900 | 36.250 |
| 59 | Belgium | Laurence Brihaye | 8.950 | 9.200 | 9.000 | 9.000 | 36.150 |
| 59 | Denmark | Susanne Ravn | 8.900 | 9.250 | 8.950 | 9.050 | 36.150 |
| 61 | Canada | Jennefer Hopkins | 9.200 | 9.000 | 8.800 | 9.100 | 36.100 |
| 62 | Finland | Leena Murtamo | 8.800 | 9.200 | 8.750 | 9.200 | 35.950 |
| 63 | Portugal | Patricia Jorge | 8.850 | 9.000 | 8.950 | 9.100 | 35.900 |
| 63 | Netherlands | Linda Oers | 8.900 | 9.150 | 8.950 | 8.900 | 35.900 |
| 63 | Norway | Ylje Wiede | 8.700 | 9.250 | 8.900 | 9.050 | 35.900 |
| 66 | United Kingdom | Nicola Walker | 9.050 | 8.800 | 9.100 | 8.900 | 35.850 |
| 67 | France | Emmanuelle Serre | 8.900 | 9.400 | 8.800 | 8.700 | 35.800 |
| 68 | Denmark | Ana-Katrine Korning | 8.900 | 9.100 | 8.800 | 8.950 | 35.75 |
| 69 | Sweden | Eva Lundovist | 8.750 | 8.600 | 9.100 | 9.250 | 35.700 |
| 70 | Finland | Marika Kosonen | 8.850 | 9.100 | 8.750 | 8.900 | 35.600 |
| 71 | Israel | Rakefet Ramigolski | 8.850 | 8.950 | 8.700 | 9.050 | 35.550 |
| 72 | Israel | Shulamit Goldstein | 8.800 | 8.900 | 8.750 | 9.050 | 35.500 |
| 72 | Netherlands | Mirjam de Kramer | 9.000 | 9.100 | 8.700 | 8.700 | 35.500 |
| 74 | Sweden | Sofia Hedman | 8.850 | 8.800 | 8.700 | 8.950 | 35.300 |
| 75 | New Zealand | Katherine Agnew | 8.750 | 9.200 | 8.600 | 8.700 | 35.250 |
| 76 | Israel | Einat Argaman | 8.850 | 8.700 | 8.600 | 9.000 | 35.150 |
| 76 | United Kingdom | Lisa Black | 8.950 | 9.050 | 8.150 | 9.000 | 35.150 |
| 78 | Norway | Ann Kristin Albertsen | 9.250 | 9.150 | 7.850 | 8.800 | 35.05 |
| 78 | Brazil | Jaqueline Pedreira | 8.800 | 8.750 | 8.700 | 8.800 | 35.05 |
| 78 | Portugal | Lurdes Silva | 8.550 | 9.000 | 8.850 | 9.000 | 36.000 |
| 81 | Portugal | Margarida Carmo | 8.950 | 8.600 | 8.250 | 9.200 | 35.00 |
| 82 | Brazil | Francoise Biot | 8.700 | 9.050 | 8.700 | 8.500 | 34.95 |
| 83 | Brazil | Rosane Favila Ferreira | 8.650 | 9.050 | 8.500 | 8.700 | 34.900 |
| 84 | Switzerland | Caroline Müller | 8.650 | 8.700 | 8.550 | 8.600 | 34.500 |
| 85 | Switzerland | Maura Genasci | 8.200 | 8.900 | 8.700 | 8.600 | 34.400 |
| 85 | Switzerland | Sabrina Muheim | 8.650 | 8.700 | 8.500 | 8.550 | 34.400 |
| 87 | United Kingdom | Viva Seifert | 8.350 | 9.000 | 7.85 | 9.050 | 34.250 |
| 88 | South Korea | Soo-Yung Kim | 8.350 | 8.800 | 8.500 | 8.500 | 34.150 |
| 89 | Finland | Mira Luhtanen | 8.000 | 8.900 | 8.350 | 8.800 | 34.050 |
| 90 | New Zealand | Melanie Cairns | 8.400 | 8.750 | 8.500 | 8.350 | 34.000 |
| 90 | Argentina | Paula Paradelas | 8.700 | 8.850 | 7.650 | 8.800 | 34.000 |
| 92 | Mexico | Diana Velarde | 8.350 | 8.500 | 8.350 | 8.450 | 33.650 |
| 93 | Australia | Nicole Mozes | 8.400 | 7.850 | 8.400 | 8.800 | 33.450 |
| 94 | Belgium | Annik Vanderstraeten | 8.250 | 8.500 | 8.150 | 8.500 | 33.400 |
| 95 | Australia | Caroline Verbruggen | 8.300 | 8.600 | 8.000 | 8.400 | 33.300 |
| 96 | Australia | Antonietta Guida | 8.500 | 8.450 | 8.150 | 8.150 | 33.250 |
| 97 | Mexico | Miriam Hinososa | 8.250 | 8.400 | 7.900 | 8.350 | 32.900 |
| 98 | Chinese Taipei for Olympic games | Hui-Huang Tsai | 8.300 | 8.200 | 7.700 | 8.550 | 32.750 |
| 99 | Chinese Taipei for Olympic games | Huei-Mei Lee | 7.600 | 7.800 | 8.300 | 8.450 | 32.15 |
| 100 | Mexico | Mariela Castillo | 7.950 | 8.150 | 7.250 | 8.200 | 31.550 |
| 101 | Chinese Taipei for Olympic games | Chih-Yuan Yan | 8.250 | 7.800 | 7.200 | 8.100 | 31.350 |
| 102 | Canada | Lise Gautreau | 9.150 | 9.350 | - | - | 18.500 |

=== Individual Rope ===
| Place | Nation | Name | All Around | Rope | Total |
|---|---|---|---|---|---|
| 1 | Bulgaria | Adriana Dunavska | 10.000 | 10.000 | 20.000 |
| 1 | Bulgaria | Bianka Panova | 10.000 | 10.000 | 20.000 |
| 3 | Soviet Union | Anna Kotchneva | 9.900 | 9.900 | 19.800 |
| 3 | Soviet Union | Marina Lobatch | 9.900 | 9.900 | 19.800 |
| 5 | Romania | Florentina Butaru | 9.800 | 9.900 | 19.700 |
| 6 | SFR Yugoslavia | Milena Reljin | 9.800 | 9.750 | 19.550 |
| 7 | Hungary | Andrea Sinko | 9.700 | 9.800 | 19.500 |
| 8 | Spain | Maria Isabel Lloret | 9.700 | 9.700 | 19.400 |

=== Individual Hoop ===
| Place | Nation | Name | All Around | Hoop | Total |
|---|---|---|---|---|---|
| 1 | Soviet Union | Marina Lobatch | 10.000 | 10.000 | 20.000 |
| 1 | Bulgaria | Bianka Panova | 10.000 | 10.000 | 20.000 |
| 3 | Soviet Union | Anna Kotchneva | 10.000 | 9.900 | 19.900 |
| 4 | Bulgaria | Adriana Dunavska | 10.000 | 9.850 | 19.850 |
| 5 | Romania | Florentina Butaru | 9.700 | 9.800 | 19.500 |
| 5 | Hungary | Andrea Sinko | 9.700 | 9.800 | 19.500 |
| 7 | Germany | Regina Weber | 9.700 | 9.750 | 19.450 |
| 8 | Czechoslovakia | Denisa Sokolovská | 9.700 | 9.700 | 19.400 |

=== Individual Clubs ===
| Place | Nation | Name | All Around | Clubs | Total |
|---|---|---|---|---|---|
| 1 | Soviet Union | Anna Kotchneva | 10.000 | 10.000 | 20.000 |
| 1 | Bulgaria | Bianka Panova | 10.000 | 10.000 | 20.000 |
| 3 | Soviet Union | Marina Lobatch | 9.950 | 10.000 | 19.950 |
| 4 | Bulgaria | Elizabeth Koleva | 10.000 | 9.850 | 19.850 |
| 5 | SFR Yugoslavia | Milena Reljin | 9.700 | 9.700 | 19.400 |
| 5 | Hungary | Andrea Sinko | 9.650 | 9.750 | 19.400 |
| 5 | Romania | Adriana Stonescu | 9.700 | 9.700 | 19.400 |
| 8 | Spain | Maria Isabel Lloret | 9.700 | 9.650 | 19.350 |

=== Individual Ribbon ===
| Place | Nation | Name | All Around | Ribbon | Total |
|---|---|---|---|---|---|
| 1 | Soviet Union | Tatiana Druchinina | 10.000 | 10.000 | 20.000 |
| 1 | Bulgaria | Bianka Panova | 10.000 | 10.000 | 20.000 |
| 3 | Bulgaria | Elizabeth Koleva | 10.000 | 9.900 | 19.900 |
| 4 | Romania | Florentina Butaru | 9.800 | 9.800 | 19.600 |
| 4 | Soviet Union | Marina Lobatch | 9.800 | 9.800 | 19.600 |
| 6 | North Korea | Suk Yong Li | 9.700 | 9.600 | 19.300 |
| 7 | Hungary | Andrea Sinko | 9.700 | 9.500 | 19.200 |
| 8 | Spain | Maria Isabel Lloret | 9.700 | 9.150 | 18.85 |

== Group ==
=== All-Around ===
The first exercise consisted of 3 balls and 3 hoops. The second exercise consisted of 6 balls.

| Place | Nation | First Exercise | Second Exercise | Total |
|---|---|---|---|---|
| 1 | Bulgaria | 20.000 | 20.000 | 40.000 |
| 2 | USSR | 19.300 | 19.900 | 39.200 |
| 3 | China | 19.600 | 19.050 | 38.650 |
| 3 | Spain | 19.450 | 19.200 | 38.650 |
| 5 | Japan | 19.350 | 18.700 | 38.050 |
| 6 | Italy | 18.950 | 18.900 | 37.850 |
| 7 | Finland | 18.900 | 18.850 | 37.750 |
| 8 | Czechoslovakia | 19.100 | 18.400 | 37.500 |
| 9 | Hungary | 18.200 | 19.100 | 37.300 |
| 9 | North Korea | 17.900 | 19.400 | 37.00 |
| 11 | France | 17.750 | 19.150 | 36.900 |
| 12 | Norway | 17.950 | 18.600 | 36.550 |
| 13 | Norway | 17.950 | 18.600 | 36.550 |
| 14 | Canada | 18.350 | 18.000 | 36.350 |
| 15 | The Netherlands | 18.000 | 18.200 | 36.200 |
| 16 | Switzerland | 17.650 | 18.500 | 36.150 |
| 17 | West Germany | 17.900 | 17.950 | 35.850 |
| 18 | USA | 16.850 | 18.650 | 35.500 |
| 19 | Brazil | 16.800 | 18.250 | 35.050 |
| 20 | New Zealand | 17.400 | 17.400 | 34.800 |

=== Finals – 6 Balls ===
| Place | Nation | All Around | Final | Total |
|---|---|---|---|---|
| 1 | Bulgaria | 20.000 | 19.900 | 39.900 |
| 2 | USSR | 19.900 | 19.750 | 39.650 |
| 3 | China | 19.050 | 19.800 | 38.850 |
| 4 | Spain | 19.200 | 19.500 | 38.700 |
| 5 | France | 19.150 | 19.250 | 38.400 |
| 6 | Hungary | 19.100 | 19.200 | 38.300 |
| 7 | Austria | 19.000 | 19.250 | 38.250 |
| 8 | North Korea | 19.400 | 18.350 | 37.750 |

=== Finals – 3 Balls, 3 Hoops ===
| Place | Nation | All Around | Final | Total |
|---|---|---|---|---|
| 1 | Bulgaria | 20.000 | 20.000 | 40.000 |
| 2 | China | 19.600 | 19.600 | 39.200 |
| 3 | Spain | 19.450 | 19.300 | 38.750 |
| 4 | USSR | 19.300 | 19.350 | 38.650 |
| 4 | Japan | 19.350 | 19.300 | 38.650 |
| 6 | Finland | 18.900 | 19.150 | 38.050 |
| 7 | Czechoslovakia | 19.100 | 18.550 | 37.650 |
| 8 | Italy | 18.950 | 18.650 | 37.600 |
