= Gymnastics at the 1988 Summer Olympics – Women's rhythmic individual all-around =

Women's rhythmic individual all-around at the Games of the XXIV Olympiad
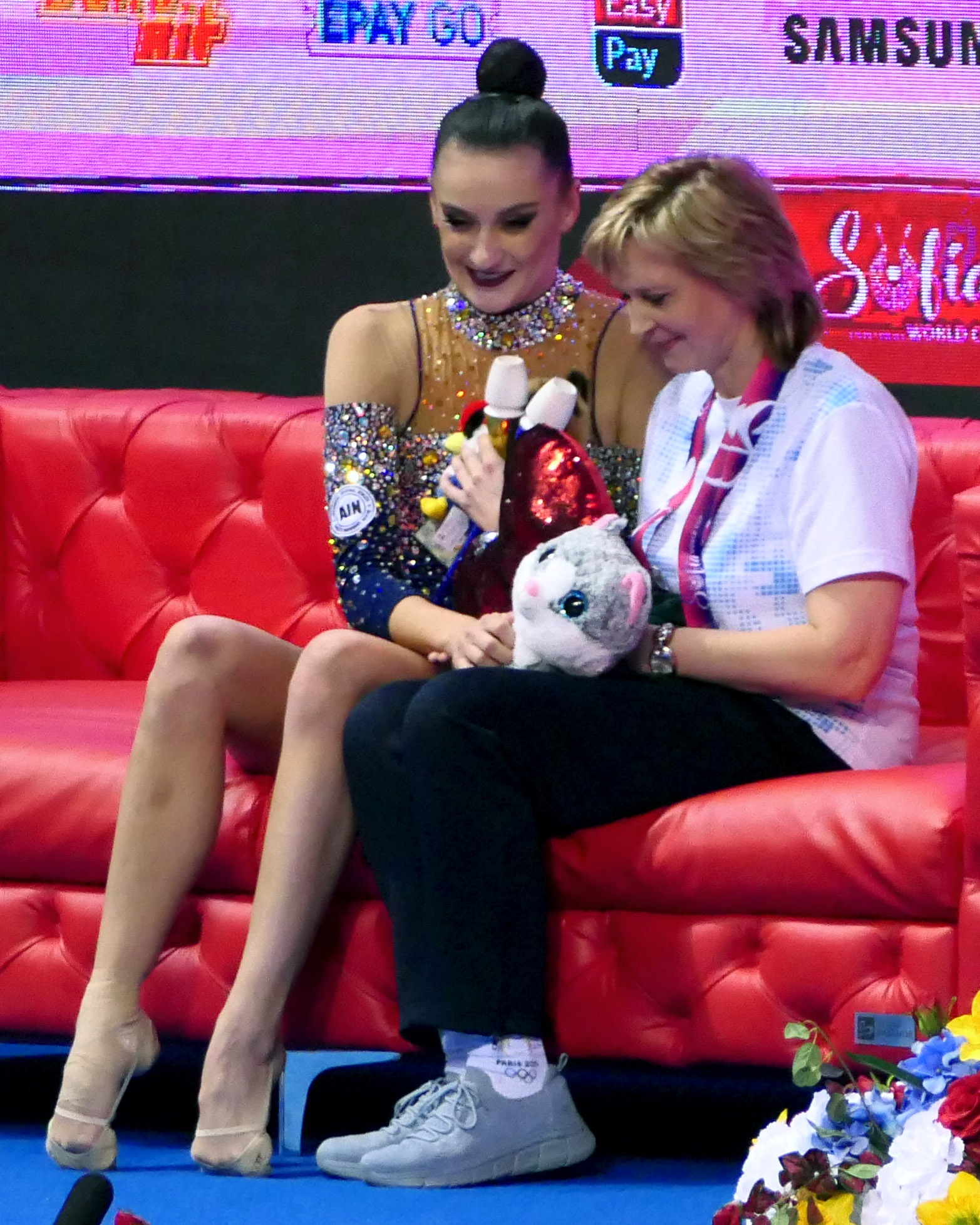
- Gold medalist Marina Lobatch (2024)
- Venue: Olympic Gymnastics Arena
- Date: 29 – 30 September 1988
- Competitors: 39 from 30 nations

Medalists
1st place, gold medalist(s)		Marina Lobatch	Soviet Union
2nd place, silver medalist(s)		Adriana Dunavska	Bulgaria
3rd place, bronze medalist(s)		Alexandra Timoshenko	Soviet Union

These are the results of the rhythmic individual all-around competition, the only Rhythmic Gymnastic event at the 1988 Summer Olympics.

Rules for the rhythmic gymnastics competition had changed after the previous Olympics. The ball apparatus was replaced by the rope. Thirty-nine gymnasts competed in the preliminary round, Each gymnast completed one exercise with each apparatus, and the twenty best gymnasts advanced to the finals. Each competitor carried over half her preliminary round score (prelim score) to the final, where it was added to her score in the final (final score). In the final, they again performed one exercise with each apparatus.

Each of the routines were judged by six judges, highest and lowest marks were dropped, and the average of the four remaining marks was the gymnast's score for the routine.

== Preliminary round ==
Rank	Name	Rope	Hoop	Clubs	Ribbon	Prelim Total
1	Marina Lobatch (URS)	10.00	10.00	10.00	10.00	40.00
2	Adriana Dunavska (BUL)	10.00	10.00	9.90	10.00	39.90
3	Alexandra Timoshenko (URS)	10.00	10.00	9.75	10.00	39.75
4	Bianka Panova (BUL)	10.00	10.00	9.55	9.90	39.45
5	Andrea Sinkó (HUN)	9.80	9.70	9.85	9.70	39.05
6	María Isabel Lloret (ESP)	9.80	9.75	9.70	9.75	39.00
6	Milena Reljin (YUG)	9.80	9.65	9.80	9.75	39.00
6	Giulia Staccioli (ITA)	9.80	9.60	9.80	9.80	39.00
9	Teresa Folga (POL)	9.75	9.50	9.80	9.80	38.85
10	Eliza Białkowska (POL)	9.75	9.75	9.65	9.65	38.80
10	Diana Schmiemann (FRG)	9.70	9.60	9.80	9.70	38.80
12	Mary Fuzesi (CAN)	9.70	9.60	9.80	9.60	38.70
12	Micaela Imperatori (ITA)	9.70	9.60	9.70	9.70	38.70
14	Pang Qiong (CHN)	9.65	9.55	9.70	9.70	38.60
14	Denisa Sokolovská (TCH)	9.65	9.60	9.80	9.55	38.60
16	María Martín (ESP)	9.75	9.50	9.70	9.60	38.55
17	Erika Akiyama (JPN)	9.70	9.45	9.70	9.65	38.50
17	He Xiaomin (CHN)	9.50	9.60	9.70	9.70	38.50
17	Marion Rothaar (FRG)	9.60	9.60	9.70	9.60	38.50
20	Nóra Érfalvy (HUN)	9.50	9.60	9.70	9.65	38.45
21	Maria Alevizou (GRE)	9.60	9.50	9.50	9.60	38.20
22	Michelle Berube (USA)	9.55	9.50	9.55	9.50	38.10
22	Lenka Oulehlová (TCH)	9.70	9.60	9.30	9.50	38.10
24	Stéphanie Cottel (FRA)	9.60	9.40	9.45	9.60	38.05
25	Elisabeth Bergmann (AUT)	9.40	9.40	9.60	9.50	37.90
26	Diane Simpson (USA)	9.45	9.45	9.50	9.40	37.80
27	Laurence Brihaye (BEL)	9.35	9.40	9.50	9.35	37.60
27	Hiroko Otsuka (JPN)	9.10	9.40	9.60	9.50	37.60
29	Hong Seong-hui (KOR)	9.35	9.40	9.05	9.55	37.35
30	Patricia Jorge (POR)	9.35	9.10	9.20	9.40	37.05
31	Kim In-hwa (KOR)	9.20	9.10	9.30	9.40	37.00
32	Lise Gautreau (CAN)	9.10	9.15	9.40	9.40	36.95
32	Angela Walker (NZL)	9.30	9.20	9.10	9.35	36.95
34	Malene Franzen (DEN)	9.20	9.25	9.20	9.20	36.85
35	Shulamit Goldstein (ISR)	9.40	8.90	8.95	9.25	36.50
35	Panagiota Tsitsela (GRE)	9.30	8.80	9.40	9.00	36.50
37	Rakefet Remigolsky (ISR)	9.35	8.85	9.00	9.25	36.45
38	Lisa Black (GBR)	9.20	9.20	8.80	9.20	36.40
39	Dara Terzić (YUG)	9.00	9.15	8.80	9.05	36.00

== Final ==
Rank	Name	Prelim Score	Rope	Hoop	Clubs	Ribbon	Final score	Total
Gold medal	Marina Lobatch (URS)	20.000	10.000	10.000	10.000	10.000	40.000	60.000
Silver medal	Adriana Dunavska (BUL)	19.950	10.000	10.000	10.000	10.000	40.000	59.950
Bronze medal	Alexandra Timoshenko (URS)	19.875	10.000	10.000	10.000	10.000	40.000	59.875
4	Bianka Panova (BUL)	19.725	10.000	10.000	10.000	10.000	40.000	59.725
5	María Isabel Lloret (ESP)	19.500	9.850	9.850	9.850	9.850	39.400	58.900
6	Andrea Sinkó (HUN)	19.525	9.850	9.800	9.800	9.800	39.250	58.775
7	Teresa Folga (POL)	19.425	9.800	9.800	9.700	9.900	39.200	58.625
8	Diana Schmiemann (FRG)	19.400	9.800	9.800	9.800	9.800	39.200	58.600
9	Milena Reljin (YUG)	19.500	9.800	9.700	9.800	9.700	39.000	58.500
10	Mary Fuzesi (CAN)	19.350	9.800	9.700	9.800	9.800	39.100	58.450
11	Pang Qiong (CHN)	19.300	9.750	9.700	9.750	9.800	39.000	58.300
12	Micaela Imperatori (ITA)	19.350	9.700	9.800	9.800	9.600	38.900	58.250
12	Denisa Sokolovská (TCH)	19.300	9.800	9.700	9.650	9.800	38.950	58.250
14	Eliza Białkowska (POL)	19.400	9.700	9.800	9.650	9.650	38.800	58.200
15	Erika Akiyama (JPN)	19.250	9.700	9.600	9.800	9.700	38.800	58.050
16	He Xiaomin (CHN)	19.250	9.700	9.655	9.700	9.700	38.750	58.000
17	Nóra Érfalvy (HUN)	19.225	9.750	9.550	9.700	9.700	38.700	57.925
18	Giulia Staccioli (ITA)	19.500	9.800	9.000	9.800	9.800	38.400	57.900
19	Marion Rothaar (FRG)	19.250	9.700	9.600	9.700	9.600	38.600	57.850
20	María Martín (ESP)	19.275	9.800	8.900	9.750	9.750	38.200	57.475
