= Belgian Rhythmic Gymnastics Championships =

Belgian gymnastics competition

The Belgian Rhythmic Gymnastics Championship is the most important national rhythmic gymnastics competition in Belgium. It has been organised by the Belgian Gymnastics Federation since 1978.

== Medalists ==
Belgian Rhythmic Gymnastics Championships medalists
Year	Gymnast
1978	Rita De Leenheer
1979	Rita De Leenheer
1980	Rita De Leenheer
1981	Claire Audenaerde
1982	J. Van Den Eerenbeemt
1983	Sarina Roberti
1984	J. Van Den Eerenbeemt
1985	Laurence Brihaye
1986	Laurence Brihaye
1987	Laurence Brihaye
1988	Laurence Brihaye
1989	Laurence Brihaye
1990	Cindy Stollenberg
1991	Cindy Stollenberg
1992	Nathalie Ragolle
1993	Cindy Stollenberg
1994	Cindy Stollenberg
1995	Isabelle Massagé
1996	Cindy Stollenberg
1997	Cécile Maissin
1998	Elke De Backer
1999	Elke De Backer
2000	Céline Darimont
2001	Géraldine Tang Quynh
2002	Géraldine Tang Quynh
2003	Géraldine Tang Quynh
2004	Inge De Backer
2005	Liesbeth Jeunen
2006	Manon Masset
2007	Catherine Gérontitis
2008	Katrien Morbee
2009	Lieselotte Diels
2010	Lieselotte Diels
2011	Lieselotte Diels
2012	Elisabeth De Leeuw / Nina Evrard
2013	Elisabeth De Leeuw
2014	Joke Verpoest
2015	Najlae Ou-Ghanem
2016	Anaïs Collin
2017	Anaïs Collin
2018	Aya Courouble
2019	Aya Courouble
2020	Cancelled due to COVID-19
2022	Alessia Verstappen
2023	Béatrice Valeanu
2024	Alessia Verstappen
2025	Laura Gielis
