= Elise Ghosh =

Canadian gymnast (born 2009)

- Born: 24 August 2009 (age 17) Toronto, Ontario

Gymnastics career
- Discipline: Rhythmic gymnastics
- Country represented: Canada (2025-present)
- Head coach: Janika Mölder
Medal record
Rhythmic Gymnastics
Representing Canada
Pan American Championships
Silver medal – second place	2025 Asunción	Group all-around

Elise Ghosh (born 24 August 2009) is a Canadian rhythmic gymnast. She represents Canada in international competitions as part of the senior group.

== Career ==
Ghosh took up the sport at age six, when her mother decided to enroll her and her sister to rhythmic gymnastics classes following one of Elise's cousins.

In November 2024 it was revealed she was called up to integrate the new Canadian group, after the previous one retired, under the guidance of Janika Mölder. She became age eligible for senior competitions in 2025. The new team debuted at Miss Valentine in Tartu, winning bronze in the All-Around and with 3 balls & 2 hoops. In May she competed in World Cup in Portimão where Canada was 6th overall, 6th with 5 ribbons and 4th with 3 balls & 2 hoops. At the Pan American Championships in Asunción, winning silver in the All-Around behind the Brazilian group. The following month the group won gold at the Canadian Championships. In July she took part in the World Cup in Milan, being 16th overall. Later that month the group participated in the stage in Cluj-Napoca, being 16th in the All-Around, 11th with 5 ribbons and 15th in the mixed routine. In August she was selected for her maiden World Championships in Rio de Janeiro along Jana Alemam, Dina Burak, Audrey Lu, Margaret Kuts and Elizabet Piskunov. There they took 24th place in the All-Around, 25th with 5 ribbons, 15th with 3 balls & 2 hoops and 18th in teams.

In 2026 she was confirmed into a renovated group, making her season debut at the Canadian Championships where she won gold. The following month the group won Miss Valentine winning silver with 5 balls and gold in the 3 hoops & 2 clubs' final. In late April they won gold in the All-Around at the Koop Cup in Markham. In May she made her seasonal World Cup debut in Portimão.
