= Margaret Kuts =

Canadian gymnast (born 2006)

- Full name: Margaret Elizabeth Kuts
- Born: 7 October 2006 (age 19) Vancouver

Gymnastics career
- Discipline: Rhythmic gymnastics
- Country represented: Canada (2022-present)
- Club: Olympia Rhythmic Gymnastics
- Head coach: Janika Mölder
Medal record
Rhythmic Gymnastics
Representing Canada
Pan American Championships
Silver medal – second place	2025 Asunción	Group all-around
Bronze medal – third place	2022 Rio de Janeiro	Team

Margaret Elizabeth Kuts (born 7 October 2006) is a Canadian rhythmic gymnast. She represents Canada in international competitions as part of the senior group.

== Personal life ==
Kuts took up both rhythmic and artistic gymnastics at age three as a way to channel her energy. When she was nine she decided to focus on rhythmic because of the fusion of athletic difficulty with artistic expression. Since 2024, she's been studying statistics at the University of Toronto Scarborough.

== Career ==
In July 2022, Kuts made her international senior debut performing with clubs and ribbon at the Pan American Championships in Rio de Janeiro, winning bronze in teams along with Carmel Kallemaa, Suzanna Shahbazian and Christina Savchenko.

In November 2024, it was revealed she was called up to integrate the new Canadian group, after the previous one retired, under the guidance of Janika Mölder. She became age-eligible for senior competitions in 2025. The new team debuted at Miss Valentine in Tartu, winning bronze in the All-Around and with 3 balls & 2 hoops. In May she competed in World Cupin Portimão where Canada was 6th overall, 6th with 5 ribbons and 4th with 3 balls &2 hoops. At the Pan American Championships in Asunción, winning silver in the All-Around behind the Brazilian group. The following month the group won gold at the Canadian Championships. In July she took part in the World Cup in Milan, being 16th overall. Later that month the group participated in the stage in Cluj-Napoca, being 16th in the All-Around, 11th with 5 ribbond and 15th in the mixed routine. In August she was selected for her maiden World Championships in Rio de Janeiro along Jana Alemam, Dina Burak, Audrey Lu, Elise Ghosh and Elizabet Piskunov. There they took 24th place in the All-Around, 25th with 5 ribbons, 15th with 3 balls & 2 hoops and 18th in teams.

In 2026 she was confirmed into a renovated group, making her season debut at the Canadian Championships where she won gold. The following month the group was at Miss Valentine winning silver with 5 balls and gold in the 3 hoops & 2 clubs 'final.
