= Béatrice Valeanu =

Belgian rhythmic gymnast

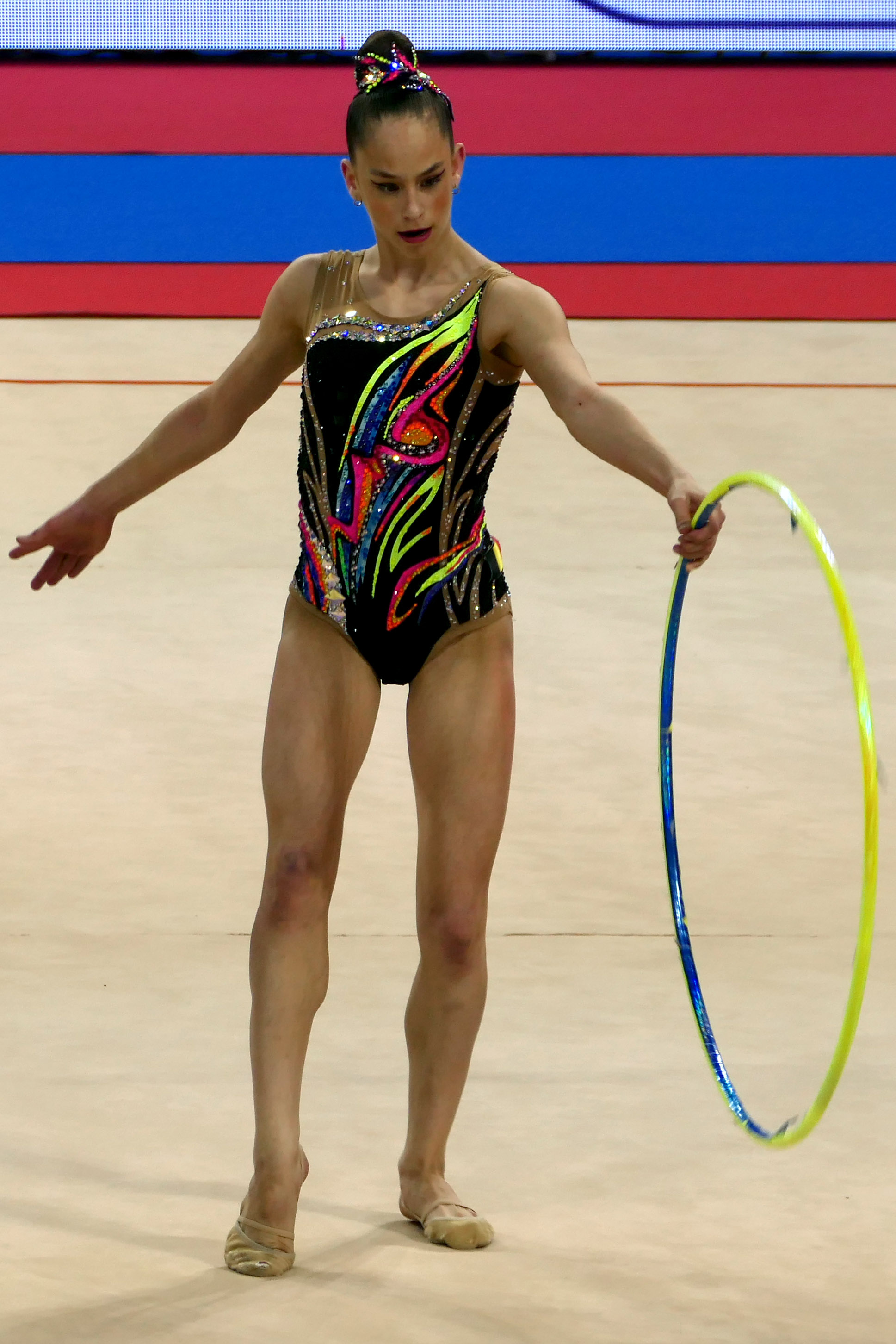

Personal information
- Born: June 22, 2007 (age 19) Brussels, Belgium

Gymnastics career
- Discipline: Rhythmic gymnastics
- Country represented: Belgium (2022–2025)
- Club: Brussels GR
- Retired: yes

Béatrice Valeanu (born 22 June 2007) is a retired Belgian individual rhythmic gymnast. She represented Belgium in international competitions.

== Career ==
=== Junior ===
In 2022 Valeanu was selected for the European Championships in Tel Aviv, where she was 29th with hoop, 29th with clubs, 22nd with ribbon and 24th in teams. That year, she was also crowned Belgian national champion among juniors.

=== Senior ===
She became age eligible for senior competitions in 2023. She made her debut at the World Cup in Portimão, where she placed 38th in the all-around, 31st with hoop, 42nd with ball, 28th with clubs and 40th with ribbon. In Ma,y she was selected for the European Championships in Baku, where she finished 57th in the all-around, 42nd with hoop, 69th with ball, 61st with clubs and 48th with ribbon. At the national level, she took gold at the Belgian Championships in front of Alessia Verstappen and Laura Kestens.

In 2024 she took part in the World Cup in Sofia where she was 45th in the all-around, 45th with hoop, 48th with ball, 30th with clubs and 49th with ribbon. In May she won silver at nationals behind Alessia Verstappen and in front of Laura Gielis. Then she was called up alongside Verstappen to compete in the European Championships in Budapest. She finished 55th in the all-around, 58th with hoop, 60th with ball, 56th with clubs and 43rd with ribbon.

In January 2025, Valeanu announced that she made the decision to retire from the sport.

== Routine music information ==
Year	Apparatus	Music Title
2024	Hoop	Hero With a Red Mask by Rok Nardin
2024	Ball	Caruso by Lara Fabian
2024	Clubs	Ra by Nathan Lanier
2024	Ribbon	Welcome To The Moulin Rouge! by Original Broadway Cast of Moulin Rouge! The Musical
2023	Hoop	Mélodrame by Loïc Nottet
2023	Ball	Mr/Mme by Loïc Nottet
2023	Clubs	Juicy Wiggle by Redfoo
2023	Ribbon	Are You Gonna Be My Girl by Jet
2022	Hoop	
2022	Ball	
2022	Clubs	Swing by Yello
2022	Ribbon	
