= Marion Rothaar =

German rhythmic gymnast

Marion Rothhaar
- Born: 18 December 1972 (age 53) Zweibrücken, Rhineland-Palatinate, West Germany
- Height: 1.42 m (4 ft 8 in)

Gymnastics career
- Discipline: Rhythmic gymnastics
- Country represented: Germany
- Club: TV Wattenscheid

Marion Rothhaar (born 18 December 1972 in Zweibrücken, Rhineland-Palatinate, West Germany) is a retired German individual rhythmic gymnast who currently works as a freelance director and dramaturge. She competed at the 1988 Summer Olympics.

== Gymnastics career ==
Rothaar began competing in 1981. At age 13, she left home to train in Wattenscheid, and she joined the West German national team at age 14.

She won four titles at the West German championships in 1987. She also competed at the 1987 Junior European Championships and placed 6th in the all-around. Later in the year, she competed at the senior World Championships and tied for 34th with Nóra Érfalvy.

The next year, she tied for 29th place at the 1988 European Championships. She competed for West Germany in the rhythmic gymnastics all-around competition at the 1988 Summer Olympics in Seoul, placing 19th overall.

In 1989, Rothaar tied for 19th at the World Championships.

Rothaar retired from competition in 1992. In 2025, speaking of her experiences as a gymnast, she said, "I didn't suffer terribly during that time, but in retrospect, I think a lot of things weren't okay," and she noted conflicting feelings of having both enjoyed competition and travel and undergoing experiences she called "traumatic".

== Post-gymnastics career ==
Beginning in 1992, she studied German studies, linguistics, and theater, film, and television studies at the University of Bochum. She briefly worked as a coach, and she has also worked as a radio journalist. She began working as a freelance director and dramaturge in 2008 and moved to Biel/Bienne around 2015.

In early 2025, she announced that she was producing a play called Neue Körper am Ende der Welt (New Bodies at the End of the World) about the Magglingen Protocols, a report on abuses Swiss gymnasts at the national training center. Rothaar said that when she read the report, she cried due to the memories it brought up in her. She also said that she wanted to raise awareness of abuse of power not only in sports, but also in other contexts such as the theatre or schools. The play ran in Biel/Bienne and Solothurn from February 2025 through May 2025.
