= Elizabeth Koleva =

Bulgarian rhythmic gymnast (born 1972)

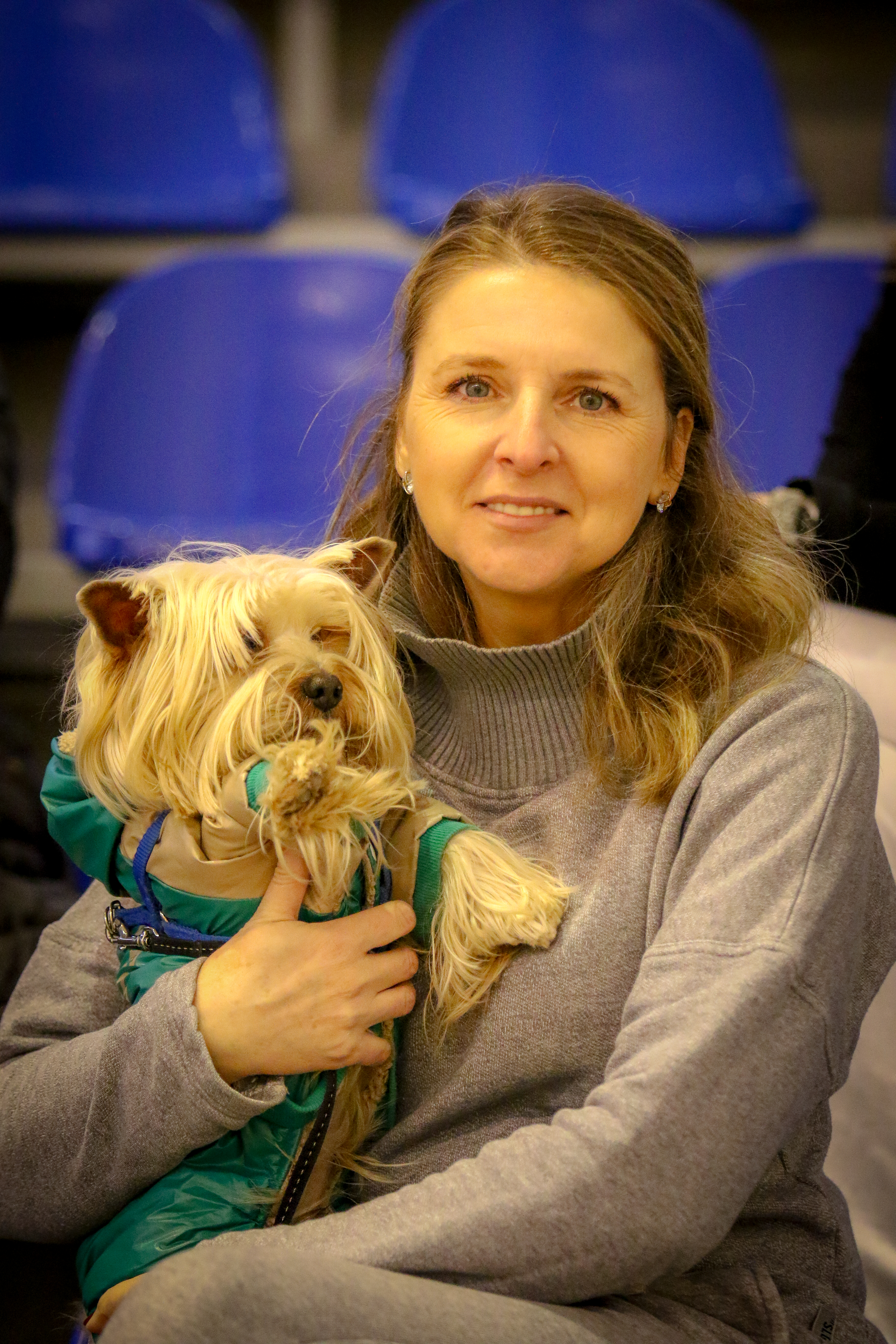

Personal information
- Born: 11 November 1972 (age 53) Sofia

Gymnastics career
- Discipline: Rhythmic gymnastics
- Country represented: Bulgaria
- Club: Slavia
- Retired: yes
Medal record
Rhythmic Gymnastics
Representing Bulgaria
World Championships
Silver medal – second place	1987 Varna	All-around
Bronze medal – third place	1987 Varna	Ribbon
European Championships
Gold medal – first place	1988 Helsinki	All-around
Gold medal – first place	1988 Helsinki	Rope
Bronze medal – third place	1988 Helsinki	Clubs
European Junior Championships
Gold medal – first place	1987 Athens	All-around
Gold medal – first place	1987 Athens	Rope
Gold medal – first place	1987 Athens	Hoop
Gold medal – first place	1987 Athens	Ball
Gold medal – first place	1987 Athens	Ribbon

Elizabeth Koleva (Bulgarian: Елизабет Колева, born 11 November 1972 in Sofia) is a retired Bulgarian individual rhythmic gymnast who now coaches.

== Biography ==
Elizabeth Koleva was born in the city of Sofia and began gymnastics at club Slavia. She was one of the Golden Girls of Bulgaria that dominated rhythmic gymnastics in the 1980s. As a member of the national team, she trained under Neshka Robeva, and her personal coach was Krassimira Filipova.

At the 1987 European Junior Championships, Koleva won the all-around title, as well as the gold medal in all four apparatus finals (rope, hoop, ball, ribbon) and achieved a maximum score of 40.00 points. She then competed as a senior at the 1987 World Championships, held in her home country of Bulgaria, where Koleva tied with teammate Adriana Dunavska for the silver medal in the all-around behind teammate Bianka Panova. She also won a bronze medal in the ribbon final.

In 1988, Koleva tied with teammate Dunavska and Soviet gymnast Alexandra Timoshenko for the gold at the European Championships, where she was also won a gold medal in rope and bronze in the clubs final. She was considered a potential medal favorite for the 1988 Summer Olympics, but she was not one of the two Bulgarian entries, as Dunavska and Panova competed there instead.

Koleva retired early at only 16 years old. She became a coach at her home club Slavia and then founded her own club in 2006. She is now a member of the management board of the Bulgarian rhythmic gymnastics federation. She married Bulgarian national volleyball and later national coach of the men's volleyball team Martin Stoev. They have a son, Eric, who also plays volleyball, and a daughter, Martina.
