= Anna Kotchneva =

Soviet rhythmic gymnast (born 1970)

Anna Kotchneva-Liukin
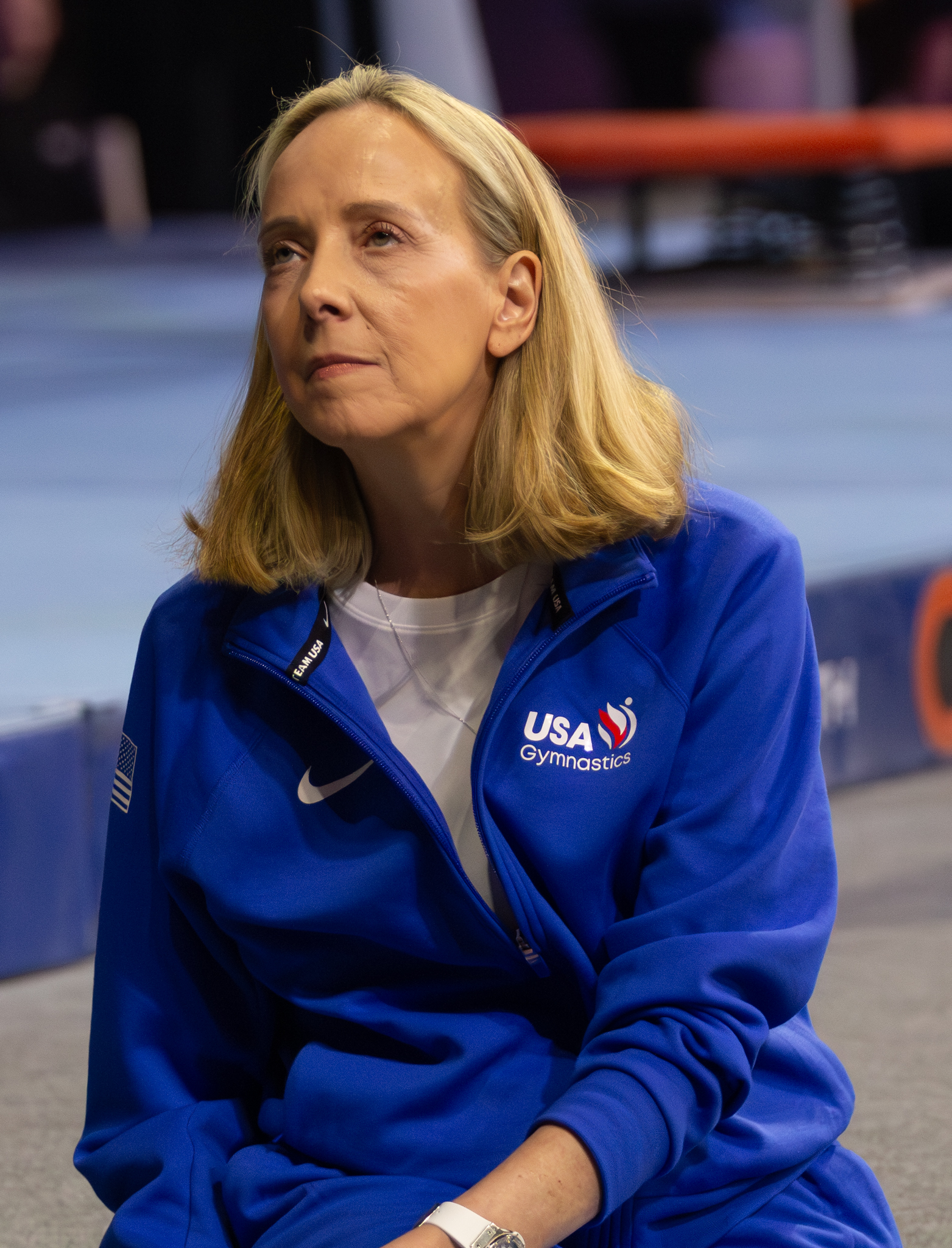
- Kotchneva in 2026

Personal information
- Born: January 25, 1970 (age 56) Moscow, Russian SFSR, Soviet Union
- Height: 5 ft 7 in (1.70 m)
- Spouse: Valeri Liukin (m. 1988)
- Relatives: Nastia Liukin (daughter)

Gymnastics career
- Discipline: Rhythmic gymnastics
- Country represented: Soviet Union
- Head coach: Natalia Karpushenko
Medal record
Representing Soviet Union
World Championships
Gold medal – first place	1987 Varna	Clubs
Bronze medal – third place	1987 Varna	Rope
Bronze medal – third place	1987 Varna	Hoop

Anna Liukin (née Kotchneva Russian: Анна Кочнева; born 25 January, 1970) is a former Russian rhythmic gymnast. She is the 1987 World clubs gold medalist.

== Career ==
Kotchneva began rhythmic gymnastics at nine, later than is typical, after trying figure skating and artistic gymnastics.

She is the 1987 World champion in clubs (tied with Bianka Panova), the 1987 World bronze medalist with hoop, and the 1987 World co-bronze medalist in the rope final with Marina Lobatch. Kotchneva won her clubs medal after failing to win the hoop final; she described becoming angry with herself and feeling a personal connection to her clubs choreography for the first time, which strengthened the expressiveness of her performance.

She intended to attempt to make the 1988 Summer Olympic team, but she missed qualifying after became ill with bouts of chickenpox and measles.

== Personal life ==
Kotchneva is married to former artistic gymnast and Olympic gold medallist, Valeri Liukin, who she met on tour in 1987. They moved to the United States in 1992. Their daughter, Nastia Liukin, is a retired United States artistic gymnast who won 5 medals at the 2008 Beijing Olympics, including the all-around gold.

Kotchneva has Crohn's disease.
