= 1988 Rhythmic Gymnastics European Championships =

- Location: Helsinki, Finland
- Start date: 19 May 1988
- End date: 22 May 1988

The 1988 Rhythmic Gymnastics European Championships is the 6th edition of the Rhythmic Gymnastics European Championships, which took place from 19 May 1988 to 22 May 1988 in Helsinki, Finland.

There was a three-way tie for gold in the all-around, with all three gymnasts being given perfect 10.0 scores. Across all the individual events, no silver medals were awarded, and only two bronzes (a tie for clubs) were given. Commentators in the Helsingin Sanomat criticized the number of perfect 10 scores and in particular, two of the scores for Bulgarian gymnast Adriana Dunavska as being too high, noting that the head judge of the competition was also Bulgarian.

This was criticized as an example of scoring inflation, and it was one impetus for changing the next code of points to attempt to better differentiate between gymnasts and reduce the number of 10.0 scores.

== Medal winners ==
| Event | Gold | Silver | Bronze |
|---|---|---|---|
Individual
| All-Around | Adriana Dunavska; Bulgaria; Elizabeth Koleva; Bulgaria; Alexandra Timochenko; Soviet Union | none awarded | none awarded |
| Rope | Marina Lobatch; Soviet Union; Alexandra Timochenko; Soviet Union; Elizabeth Koleva; Bulgaria | none awarded | none awarded |
| Hoop | Bianka Panova; Bulgaria; Alexandra Timochenko; Soviet Union; Adriana Dunavska; Bulgaria | none awarded | none awarded |
| Clubs | Adriana Dunavska; Bulgaria; Alexandra Timochenko; Soviet Union | none awarded | Elizabeth Koleva; Bulgaria; Marina Lobatch; Soviet Union |
| Ribbon | Adriana Dunavska; Bulgaria; Bianka Panova; Bulgaria; Marina Lobatch; Soviet Union | none awarded | none awarded |
Groups
| All-Around | Bulgaria | Soviet Union; Elina Khozlu; Janika Mölder | Hungary |
| 6 Balls | Bulgaria | Soviet Union; Elina Khozlu; Janika Mölder | Spain; Beatriz Barral; Vanesa Buitrago; Ana Carlota de la Fuente; Natalia Marín; Eva Martín; Arancha Marty; Mari Carmen Moreno; Raquel Prat; Astrid Sánchez; Carmen Sánchez |
| 3 Hoops & 3 Ribbons | Bulgaria; Soviet Union; Elina Khozlu; Janika Mölder | none awarded | Italy |

== Medal table ==
| Rank | Nation | Gold | Silver | Bronze | Total |
|---|---|---|---|---|---|
| 1 | Bulgaria (BUL) | 11 | 0 | 1 | 12 |
| 2 | Soviet Union (URS) | 7 | 2 | 1 | 10 |
| 3 | Hungary (HUN) | 0 | 0 | 1 | 1 |
| 3 | Italy (ITA) | 0 | 0 | 1 | 1 |
| 3 | Spain (ESP) | 0 | 0 | 1 | 1 |
| Totals (5 entries) | | 18 | 2 | 5 | 25 |
