= Elina Khozlu =

Soviet rhythmic gymnast

- Full name: Elina Leontiivna Khozlu
- Born: 27 February 1971 (age 55) Zaporozhye, Ukrainian SSR, Soviet Union (now - Zaporizhzhia, Ukraine)

Gymnastics career
- Discipline: Rhythmic gymnastics
- Country represented: Soviet Union
- Club: Deriugins School
- Head coach: Albina Deriugina
- Assistant coach: Iryna Deriugina
- Retired: yes
Medal record
Rhythmic gymnastics
Representing Soviet Union
World Championships
Gold medal – first place	1989 Sarajevo	3 hoops + 3 ribbons
Silver medal – second place	1989 Sarajevo	Group all-around
Silver medal – second place	1989 Sarajevo	6 clubs
European Championships
Gold medal – first place	1988 Helsinki	3 hoops + 3 ribbons
Silver medal – second place	1988 Helsinki	Group all-around
Silver medal – second place	1988 Helsinki	6 balls

Elina Leontiivna Khozlu (Ukrainian: Еліна Леонтіївна Хозлу, born 1971) is a retired Soviet group rhythmic gymnast.

== Career ==
Khozlu trained in Deriugins School with head coach Albina Deriugina.

In 1986, she competed at the Debrecen Grand Prix, where she finished 6th in ball and ribbon and 8th in all-around and with clubs.

In 1988, she competed at the European Championships in Helsinki, winning silver in the all-around and with 6 balls as well as gold with 3 hoops and 3 ribbons.

The following year, at the World Championships in Sarajevo, the Soviet group won gold with 3 hoops and 3 ribbons as well as silver both in the all-around and with 6 clubs.

In 1990, Khozulu received an honor of Master of Sports of the USSR of international class. She graduated from the National University of Ukraine on Physical Education and Sport in Kyiv in 1992.

She is currently a coach of rhythmic gymnastics in Deriugins School. Khozlu was the first coach of Taisiia Onofriichuk, the 2024 European hoop bronze medalist and the 2023 Junior World clubs silver medalist.

In 2021, Khozlu was awarded with the title of "Honored Labour of Physical Culture of Ukraine" by Ukrainian president Volodymyr Zelenskyy.

In 2025, Elina Khozlu was awarded with the title of "Merited Coach of Ukraine" after the win of all-around title of Taisiia Onofriichuk at the 2025 European Championships.
