= Stéphanie Cottel =

French rhythmic gymnast (born 1972)

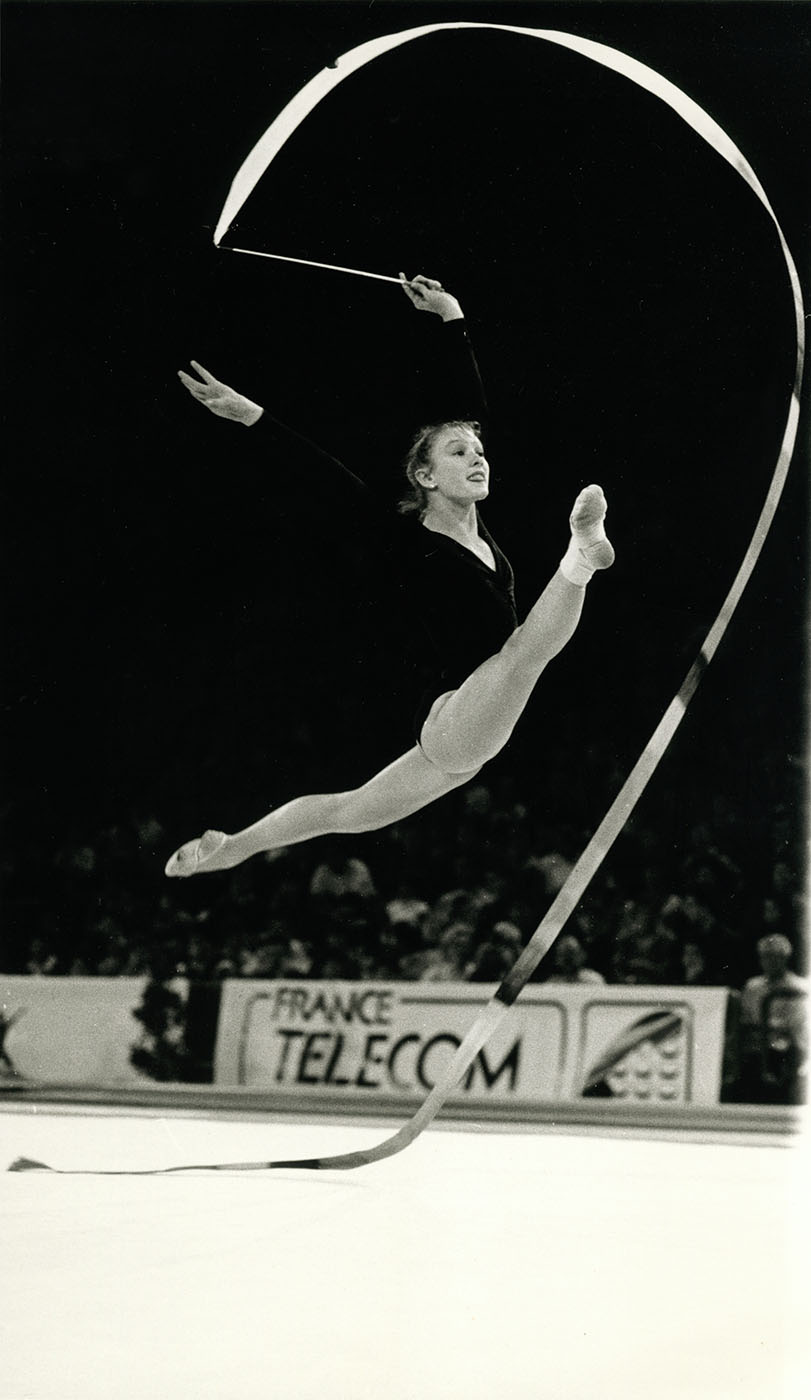

Personal information
- Born: 17 February 1972 (age 54) Charens, Drôme, France
- Height: 163 cm (5 ft 4 in)

Gymnastics career
- Discipline: Rhythmic gymnastics
- Country represented: France
- Club: Evry SCA 2000

Stéphanie Cottel (born 17 February 1972, Charens, Drôme, France) is a retired French rhythmic gymnast.

She represented France in the individual rhythmic gymnastics all-around competition at the 1988 Olympic Games in Seoul. She was 24th in the qualification round and didn't advance to the final.
