= Janika Mölder =

Estonian rhythmic gymnast and coach (born 1970)

- Born: 4 January 1970 (age 56) Tartu, then part of Estonian SSR, Soviet Union
- Spouse: Kaupo Kallemaa

Gymnastics career
- Discipline: Rhythmic gymnastics
- Country represented: Soviet Union (1986-1989)
- Retired: 1992
Medal record
Representing Soviet Union
European Championships
Gold medal – first place	1988 Helsinki	3 Hoops + 3 Ribbons
Silver medal – second place	1986 Florence	Group All-Around
Silver medal – second place	1988 Helsinki	Group All-Around
Silver medal – second place	1988 Helsinki	6 Balls
World Championships
Gold medal – first place	1989 Sarajevo	3 Hoops + 3 Ribbons
Silver medal – second place	1987 Varna	Group All-Around
Silver medal – second place	1987 Varna	6 Balls
Silver medal – second place	1989 Sarajevo	Group All-Around
Silver medal – second place	1989 Sarajevo	6 Clubs

Janika Mölder (born 4 January 1970) is a retired Estonian rhythmic gymnast and coach.

== Early life and career ==
Mölder has become Estonian champion 22 times, thus making the Soviet national rhythmic gymnastics team as part of the group. She made her debut at the European Championships in 1986, winning silver.

At the World Championships in 1987 they won silver in the All-Around and with 6 balls behind Bulgaria . In 1988 she competed at the European Championships in Helsinki, winning silver in the All-Around and with 6 balls as well as gold with 3 hoops and 3 ribbons, she also graduated from the Tallinn Secondary School of Science. The following year, at the World Championships in Sarajevo, the Soviet group won gold with 3 hoops and 3 ribbons, silver in the All-Around and with 6 clubs.

In 1993 she graduated from the Faculty of Physical Education of the University of Tartu. Later she founded her own rhythmic gymnastics club, Janika. Since 1995 she organise the Miss Valentine tournament in Tartu.

Janika Mölder has been a member of the Estonian Reform Party since 1999.

== Membership and award ==
She was a member of Tartu City Council from 1993 to 1996, from 1999 to 2002 and from 2009 to 2012. In 2017 she was awarded the Order of the White Star 5th class.

== Personal life ==
In 2012 she married her longtime partner Kaupo Kallemaa, with whom she has two children: Carmel (1997) who's also a rhythmic gymnast, and Carl-Aksel (2004). Since then, she has divided her time between Estonia and Canada, where her daughter Carmel, who previously represented Estonia in competitions and now competes for Canada, working at club Kalev Estienne, founded by Estonian Evi-Evelyn Koop. She now coaches at the Glimmer Athletic Club.
