= Malene Franzen =

Danish rhythmic gymnast (born 1970)

- Born: September 28, 1970 (age 55) Kastrup, Tårnby Municipality, Capital Region of Denmark, Denmark
- Height: 164 cm (5 ft 5 in) (at the 1988 Olympics)

Gymnastics career
- Discipline: Rhythmic gymnastics
- Country represented: Denmark
- Club: Taastrup Idræts Klub

Malene Franzen (September 28, 1970 in Kastrup) is a Danish former individual rhythmic gymnast. She competed for Denmark in the rhythmic gymnastics individual all-around competition at the 1988 Summer Olympics in Seoul.

== Early life ==
Franzen has a brother, Ulrik. Her mother, Vibeke Franzen, was her personal coach, as well as the national rhythmic gymnastics coach and a leader in promoting rhythmic gymnastics in Denmark.

== Career ==
Franzen was the most internationally successful Danish rhythmic gymnast during her career.

In 1985, she competed at the Nordic Rhythmic Gymnastics Championships, her first international competition. That October, she competed at the World Championships in Valladolid, where she tied for 70th in the all-around qualifications.

She competed next year at the 1986 European Championships in Florence, and she finished in 56th place in the all-around. The next year, at the 1987 World Championships in Varna, Bulgaria, where she tied for 49th place. The Championships acted as a qualification event for the upcoming 1988 Summer Olympics, and the top 50 placements in the all-around won an Olympic quota for their country.

Franzen was selected to use the quota she had won for the 1988 Summer Olympics; she was the only Nordic rhythmic gymnast to compete there. She finished 34th in the preliminary (qualification) round and did not advance to the final after scoring 9.25 points in her best exercise, with hoop, and 9.20 points in her other three routines. As of 2024, she is the only Danish rhythmic gymnast to have competed at the Olympics.

Her last major international competition was the 1989 World Championships. There she tied for 58th place.

== Personal life ==
Franzen lives on Amager and has a son, Emil.
