= Panagiota Tsitsela =

Greek rhythmic gymnast (born 1972)

- Born: August 1, 1972 (age 54)
- Height: 160 cm (5 ft 3 in)

Gymnastics career
- Discipline: Rhythmic gymnastics
- Country represented: Greece

Panagiota Tsitsela (Greek: Παναγιώτα Τσιτσελά, born August 1, 1972) is a retired Greek rhythmic gymnast.

She competed for Greece in the rhythmic gymnastics all-around competition at the 1988 Summer Olympics in Seoul. She tied for 35th place in the qualification round and didn't advance to the final.
