= Alessia Verstappen =

Belgian rhythmic gymnast

- Born: June 20, 2006 (age 20) Sint-Niklaas, Belgium

Gymnastics career
- Discipline: Rhythmic gymnastics
- Country represented: Belgium (2019–2025)
- Club: Happy Gym
- Head coach: Roumiana Bourova
- Retired: yes

Alessia Verstappen (born June 20 2006) is a retired Belgian individual rhythmic gymnast. On national level, she is a three-time (2022–2024) senior all-around champion.

== Personal life ==
Verstappen took up the sport at age 5 after her parents noticed she was a problem eater as a toddler and decided to make her do sport to encourage her appetite and health. At first they opted for ballet, as Verstappen's great-grandmother was a ballet dancer, but then she saw rhythmic gymnastics at the Olympics and fell in love. She trained 7 to 8 hours a day and her dream was to compete at the 2024 Olympic Games in Paris. She speaks Dutch and Russian.

== Career ==
=== Junior ===
Alessia debuted internationally in 2019 at the 1st Junior World Championships in Moscow along with her teammate Alexandra Safronova. She performed only with rope, where she scored 12.100 for 41st place.

=== Senior ===
In May 2022, her first senior year, she became Belgian champion ahead of Carina Iacos and Oona De Decker. A month later, she competed in the European Championships in Tel Aviv, where she was 54th in the all-around, 55th with hoop, 63rd with ball, 44th with clubs and 54th with ribbon. In September, she was selected as the sole representative for Belgium for the World Championships in Sofia. She ended 58th in the all-around, 52nd with hoop, 65th with ball, 53rd with clubs and 62nd with ribbon.

In 2024, she represented Belgium at the 2024 European Championships in Budapest, Hungary and took 52nd place in the all-around.

She started the 2025 season at Miss Valentine Grand Prix in Tartu, Estonia, where she ended in 20th place in the all-around. On April 18–20, she competed at the Baku World Cup and finished 57th in the all-around.

She announced her retirement on June 13 via her Instagram profile due to having had multiple injuries in 2025.

== Routine music information ==
Year	Apparatus	Music Title
2025	Hoop	
2025	Ball	Black Lord by Eronika
2025	Clubs	
2025	Ribbon	
2024	Hoop	Believer by Tommee Profitt feat. Colton Dixon
2024	Ball	The Illusionist by Maxime Rodriguez
2024	Clubs	
2024	Ribbon	Lust of Power by Gabriel Saban
