= Hong Seong-hui =

South Korean rhythmic gymnast

- Born: July 9, 1969 (age 57)
- Height: 163 cm (5 ft 4 in) (at the 1988 Olympics)

Gymnastics career
- Discipline: Rhythmic gymnastics
- Country represented: South Korea

Hong Seong-hui (Korean: 홍성희; July 9, 1969) is a South Korean rhythmic gymnast.

Hong Seong-hui competed for South Korea in the rhythmic gymnastics individual all-around competition at the 1988 Summer Olympics in Seoul. There she was 29th in the preliminary (qualification) round and did not advance to the final.
