= Rakefet Remigolski =

Israeli rhythmic gymnast (born 1971)

Rakefet Remigolski רקפת רמיגולסקי
- Born: December 8, 1971 (age 54)
- Height: 5 ft 1.5 in (1.562 m)

Gymnastics career
- Discipline: Rhythmic gymnastics
- Country represented: Israel

Rakefet Remigolski (also "Remigolsky"; Hebrew: רקפת רמיגולסקי; born December 8, 1971) is an Israeli former Olympic rhythmic gymnast.

== Rhythmic gymnastics career ==
Remigolski competed for the Israeli team at the 1988 Summer Olympics in Seoul, South Korea, at the age of 16 in Rhythmic Gymnastics (as Israel's youngest competitor at the 1988 Olympics). In the women's individual all-around she came in 37th. As for individual apparatuses, in hoop Remigolski came in 38th, in rope she tied for 28th, in clubs she finished 36th, and in ribbon she came in tied for 34th. When she competed in the Olympics she was 5 ft 1.5 in (1.562 m) tall and weighed 97 pounds (44 kg).
