= Giulia Staccioli =

Italian rhythmic gymnast (born 1964)

- Born: 6 June 1964 (age 62)
- Height: 1.73 m (5 ft 8 in)

Gymnastics career
- Discipline: Rhythmic gymnastics
- Country represented: Italy

Giulia Staccioli (born 6 June 1964) is a retired Italian rhythmic gymnast.

She competed for Italy in the rhythmic gymnastics all-around competition at two Olympic Games: in 1984 in Los Angeles and in 1988 in Seoul. In 1984 she placed 7th overall, in 1988 18th.
