= Lise Gautreau =

Canadian rhythmic gymnast

- Full name: Lise Marie Gautreau-Robichaud
- Born: April 29, 1967 (age 59) Moncton, New Brunswick, Canada
- Height: 159 cm (5 ft 3 in) (at the 1988 Olympics)

Gymnastics career
- Discipline: Rhythmic gymnastics
- Country represented: Canada
- Club: University of Moncton

Lise Marie Gautreau-Robichaud (née Gautreau; born April 29, 1967, in Moncton, New Brunswick) is a Canadian former individual rhythmic gymnast who competed at the 1988 Summer Olympics. She now works as a French immersion school teacher.

== Career ==
Gautreau first began training in artistic gymnastics, before switching to rhythmic at age 12. She won the junior national title two years later in 1981. In 1983, she tied for the national senior bronze medal.

During her career, she trained at the University of Moncton and was expected to train even during winter storms when the university cancelled classes. Gautreau also later mentioned that she was "always hungry", as she was expected to keep her weight low.

For four consecutive years (1984–1987), she was the national silver medalist behind Lori Fung. Based on her results at the 1984 Canadian Championships, Gautreau assumed she would be selected for the 1984 Summer Olympics along with Fung; however, Adrianne Dunnett, who did not compete at the Canadian Championships due to breaking her foot two days prior, was sent instead on the basis of her past performance. Gautreau said she was told she was "too young" at 17 years old and alleged that the decision was political.

Gautreau competed in the 1985 World Championships, where she tied for 38th place.

In May 1986, she and several other Canadian rhythmic gymnasts were scheduled to compete in Bulgaria and France. However, their trips were cancelled by the Canadian Rhythmic Gymnastics Federation due to the Chernobyl disaster sparking fears of radioactive contamination. That October, she competed at the Four Continents Gymnastics Championships and finished in 9th place. At the World Championships in November, she fractured her foot during the competition and was in 40th place after two rounds of competition. She withdrew from the remainder of the competition.

The next year, at the Four Continents Championships, she finished in 10th place. After finishing third at the Canadian Championships and at the Olympic selection event, and with the unexpected retirement of Fung shortly before the Olympic team selection, she was named to the team for the 1988 Summer Olympics, along with Mary Fuzesi. Gautreau said of making the team, "I only had one dream in my entire career and now I've finally achieved it. It was something that was taken away from me in 1984 and I'm glad I had a chance this year to get it back." She later said that she was told that at 21, she was "too old".

Gautreau competed in the individual competition at the 1988 Summer Olympics in Seoul. There she tied for 32nd place in the preliminary (qualification) round and did not advance to the final. Her pianist, who played live accompaniment for her routines, was Roger Lord. The Olympics were Gautreau's last competition. She had stress fractures from overuse injuries and was struggling to keep her weight at the expected level.

== Personal life ==
Gautrea's older sister was a gymnast as well. She also has a brother and a younger sister. She is Acadian and was the first Acadian to represent Canada at the Olympics.

She has two children, Magali and Damien. After finishing her gymnastics career, she became a teacher at French immersion schools.
