= Kim In-hwa =

South Korean rhythmic gymnast

- Born: October 5, 1969 (age 56)
- Height: 165 cm (5 ft 5 in) (at the 1988 Olympics)

Gymnastics career
- Discipline: Rhythmic gymnastics
- Country represented: South Korea

Kim In-hwa (Korean: 김인화; born October 5, 1969) is a South Korean rhythmic gymnast.

Kim competed for South Korea in the rhythmic gymnastics individual all-around competition at the 1988 Summer Olympics in Seoul. There she was 31st in the preliminary (qualification) round and did not advance to the final.
