= Maria Alevizou =

Greek rhythmic gymnast (born 1968)

- Born: 15 November 1968 (age 57) Kalamata, Peloponnese, Greece
- Height: 165 cm (5 ft 5 in)

Gymnastics career
- Discipline: Rhythmic gymnastics
- Country represented: Greece

Maria Alevizou (Greek: Μαρία Αλεβίζου, born 15 November 1968, Kalamata, Peloponnese) is a retired Greek rhythmic gymnast.

She competed for Greece in the rhythmic gymnastics all-around competition at the 1988 Summer Olympics in Seoul. She was 21st in the qualification round and didn't advance to the final.
