= Maisa Lloret =

Spanish rhythmic gymnast and politician (born 1971)

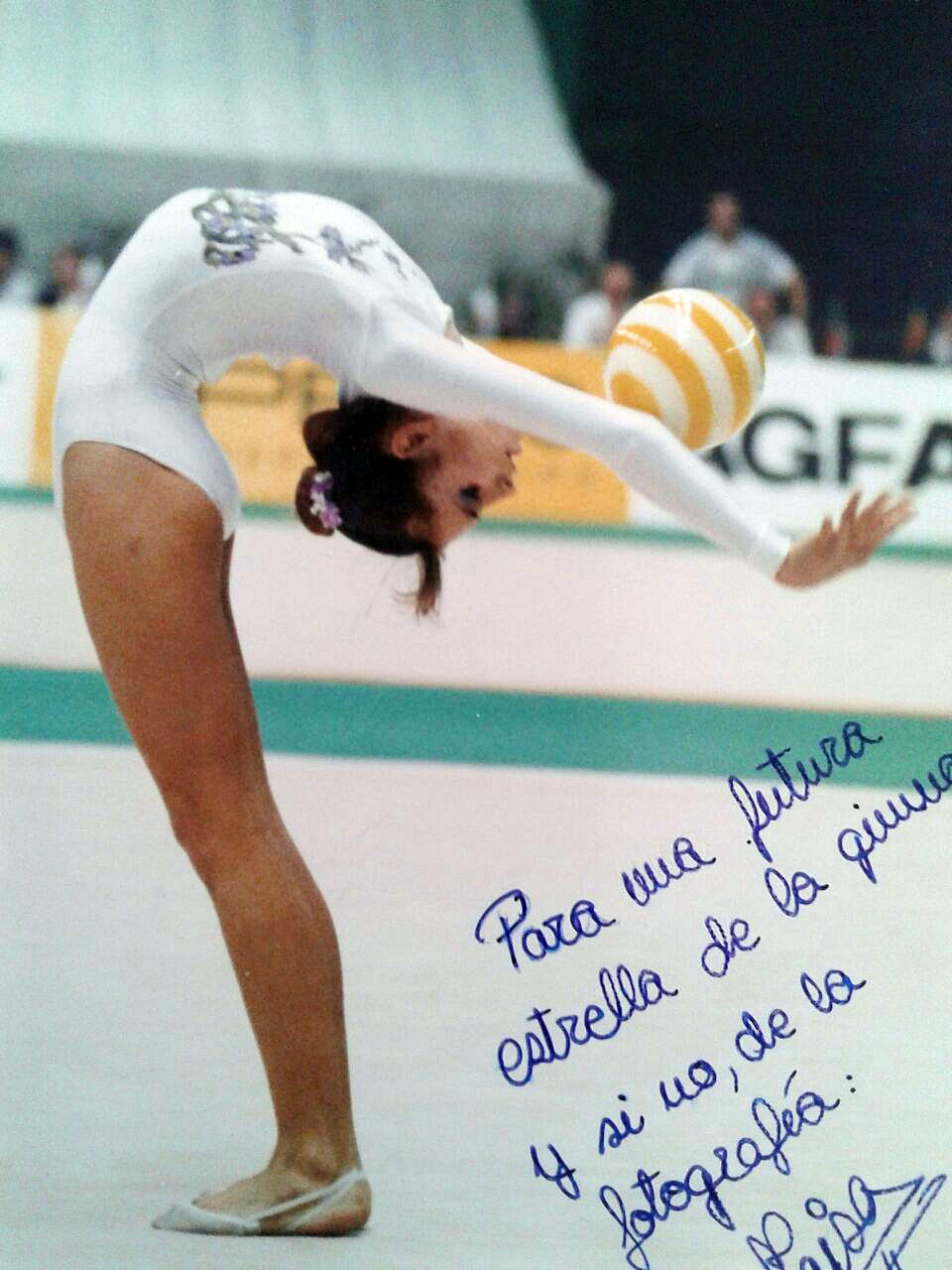
- Lloret as a rhythmic gymnast in 1986

Personal information
- Full name: María Isabel Lloret Ivorra
- Born: 4 June 1971 (age 55) Villajoyosa, Alicante

Gymnastics career
- Discipline: Rhythmic gymnastics
- Country represented: Spain

María Isabel Lloret Ivorra (born 4 June 1971 in Villajoyosa, Alicante), better known as Maisa Lloret, is a retired Spanish rhythmic gymnast, currently a Valencian politician.

She competed for Spain in the rhythmic gymnastics all-around competition at the 1988 Summer Olympics in Seoul, placing fifth overall.

The "Maisa Lloret Pavilion" in Villajoyosa was named in her honor, a street in the municipality of San Miguel de Salinas bears her name, and a street in Alicante has been called "Gymnast Maisa Lloret" since 2018.
