= Erika Akiyama =

Japanese rhythmic gymnast (born 1964)

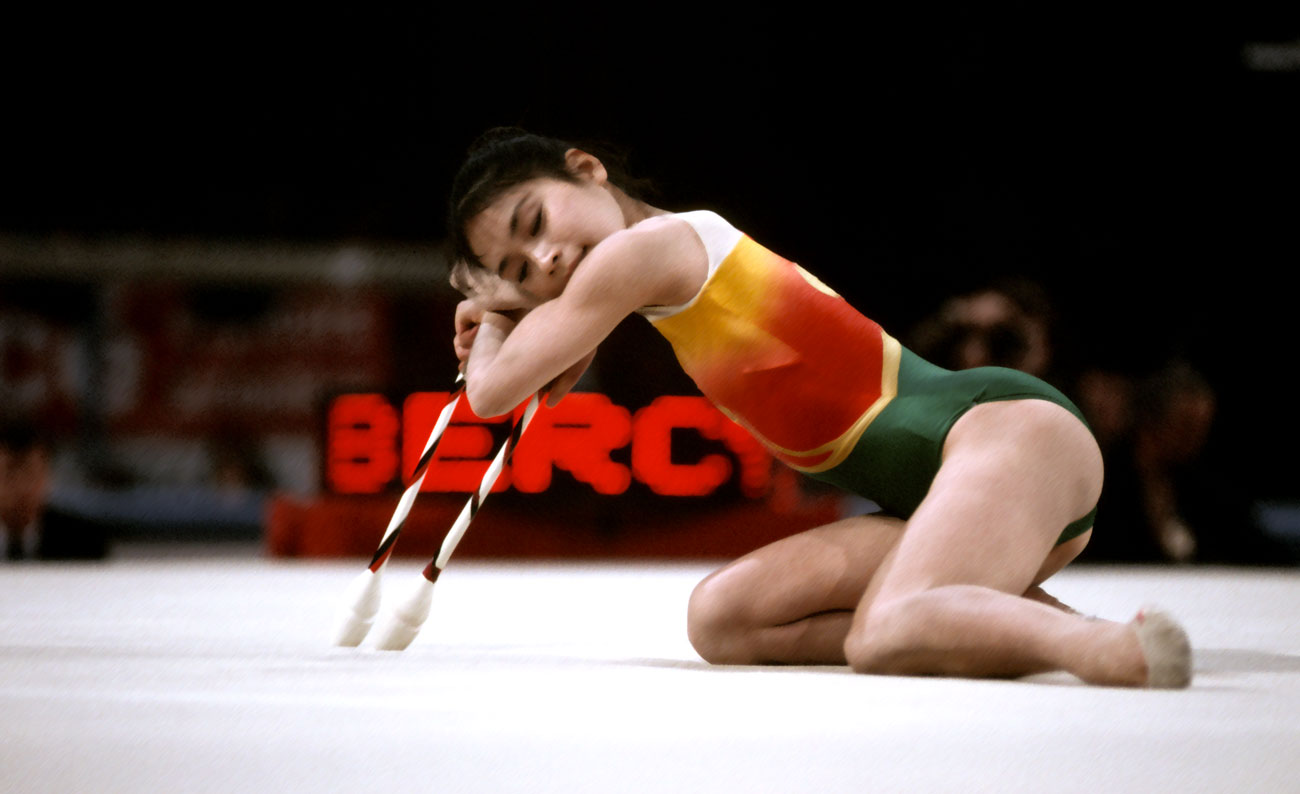
- Erika Akiyama at Paris-Bercy in 1988

Personal information
- Born: December 31, 1964 (age 61) Fukuoka Prefecture, Japan
- Height: 156 cm (5 ft 1 in)

Gymnastics career
- Discipline: Rhythmic gymnastics
- Country represented: Japan
Medal record
Rhythmic gymnastics
Representing Japan
Four Continents Championships
Gold medal – first place	1990 Tokyo	All-around
Bronze medal – third place	1988 Toronto	All-around

Erika Akiyama (Japanese: 秋山 エリカ, born December 31, 1964, Fukuoka) is a retired Japanese rhythmic gymnast, a gymnastics coach.

She competed for Japan in the individual rhythmic gymnastics all-around competition at two Olympic Games: in 1984 in Los Angeles in 1988 in Seoul. In 1984 she was 13th in the qualification and advanced to the final, placing 13th overall, in 1988 she tied for 17th place in the qualification and again advanced to the final, placing 15th overall.
