= Charens =

Commune in France

- Commune
- Location of Charens
- Location within France Location within Auvergne-Rhône-Alpes
- Coordinates: 44°32′21″N 5°30′38″E
- Country: France
- Region: Auvergne-Rhône-Alpes
- Department: Drôme
- Arrondissement: Die
- Canton: Le Diois
- Intercommunality: Diois

Government
  - Mayor (2020–2026): Thierry Alleoud
- Area^{1}: 13.47 km^{2} (5.20 sq mi)
- Highest elevation: 1,551 m (5,089 ft)
- Lowest elevation: 644 m (2,113 ft)
- Population (2023): 32
  - Density: 2.4/km^{2} (6.2/sq mi)
- Time zone: UTC+01:00 (CET)
  - Summer (DST): UTC+02:00 (CEST)
- INSEE/Postal code: 26076 /26310
- ^{1} French Land Register data, which excludes lakes, ponds, glaciers > 1 km^{2} (0.386 sq mi or 247 acres) and river estuaries.

Charens is a commune of the Drôme department in southeastern France.

== Population ==
Historical population
Year	Pop.	±% p.a.
1968	50	—
1975	36	−4.58%
1982	33	−1.24%
1990	31	−0.78%
1999	33	+0.70%
2007	21	−5.49%
2012	26	+4.36%
2017	28	+1.49%
2023	32	+2.25%
Source: INSEE

== See also ==
- Communes of the Drôme department
