= Denisa Sokolovská =

- Born: 27 May 1971 (age 55) Jaroměř, Hradec Králové Region, Czechoslovakia
- Height: 1.64 m (5 ft 4 1/2 in)

Gymnastics career
- Discipline: Rhythmic gymnastics
- Country represented: Czechoslovakia

Denisa Sokolovská (born 27 May 1971, Jaroměř, Hradec Králové Region, Czechoslovakia) is a retired Czech rhythmic gymnast.

She competed for Czechoslovakia in the rhythmic gymnastics all-around competition at the 1988 Olympic Games in Seoul. She tied for 14th place in the qualification and advanced to the final, placing 12th overall.
