= Andrea Sinkó =

Hungarian rhythmic gymnast

- Born: 14 February 1967 (age 59) Budapest, Hungary
- Height: 1.56 m (5 ft 1 1/2 in)

Gymnastics career
- Discipline: Rhythmic gymnastics
- Country represented: Hungary
- Club: Szolg. Építök Spartacus

Andrea Sinkó (born 14 February 1967 in Budapest) is a retired Hungarian rhythmic gymnast.

She competed for Hungary in the rhythmic gymnastics all-around competition at the 1988 Olympic Games in Seoul. She was 5th in the qualification and advanced to the final, placing 6th overall.

She is the daughter of the late actor László Sinkó and niece of the late actor Imre Sinkovits.
