= Hiroko Otsuka =

Japanese rhythmic gymnast

- Born: March 8, 1967 (age 59) Uwajima, Ehime, Japan
- Height: 159 cm (5 ft 3 in)

Gymnastics career
- Discipline: Rhythmic gymnastics
- Country represented: Japan

Hiroko Otsuka (Japanese: 大塚 裕子, Ōtsuka Hiroko, born March 8, 1967, Uwajima, Ehime) is a retired Japanese rhythmic gymnast.

She competed for Japan in the individual rhythmic gymnastics all-around competition at the 1988 Olympic Games in Seoul. She tied for 27th place in the qualification round and didn't advance to the final.
