= Pang Qiong =

Chinese rhythmic gymnast

- Born: October 1, 1970 (age 55) Shaanxi, China
- Height: 160 cm (5 ft 3 in)

Gymnastics career
- Discipline: Rhythmic gymnastics
- Country represented: China
Medal record
Representing China
Summer Universiade
Bronze medal – third place	1991 Sheffield	Clubs

Pang Qiong (Chinese: 龐 瓊, born October 1, 1970) is a retired Chinese rhythmic gymnast.

She competed for China in the rhythmic gymnastics all-around competition at the 1988 Summer Olympics in Seoul. She tied for 14th place in the qualification round and advanced to the final, ending up in 11th place overall.
