= Elisabeth Bergmann =

Austrian rhythmic gymnast (born 1970)

- Born: November 20, 1970 (age 55)
- Height: 174 cm (5 ft 9 in) (at the 1988 Olympics)

Gymnastics career
- Discipline: Rhythmic gymnastics
- Country represented: Austria

Elisabeth Bergmann (November 20, 1970) is an Austrian rhythmic gymnast.

Elisabeth Bergmann competed for Austria in the rhythmic gymnastics individual all-around competition at the 1988 Summer Olympics in Seoul. There she was 25th in the preliminary (qualification) round.
