= Adriana Dunavska =

Bulgarian rhythmic gymnast

- Born: 21 April 1969 (age 57) Sofia

Gymnastics career
- Discipline: Rhythmic gymnastics
- Country represented: Bulgaria
- Club: CSKA Sofia
Medal record
Rhythmic gymnastics
Representing Bulgaria
Olympic Games
Silver medal – second place	1988 Seoul	All-around
World Championships
Gold medal – first place	1987 Varna	Rope
Silver medal – second place	1987 Varna	All-around
Silver medal – second place	1989 Sarajevo	Ball
Silver medal – second place	1989 Sarajevo	Ribbon
Bronze medal – third place	1989 Sarajevo	All-around
European Championships
Gold medal – first place	1986 Florence	Ball
Gold medal – first place	1988 Helsinki	All-around
Gold medal – first place	1988 Helsinki	Ribbon
Gold medal – first place	1988 Helsinki	Clubs
Gold medal – first place	1988 Helsinki	Hoop
European Cup Final
Gold medal – first place	1988 Hanover	Rope
Silver medal – second place	1988 Hanover	All-around
Silver medal – second place	1988 Hanover	Ribbon
Bronze medal – third place	1988 Hanover	Hoop

Adriana Dunavska (Bulgarian: Адриана Дунавска) (born 21 April 1969) is a Bulgarian individual rhythmic gymnast. She is the 1988 Olympic all-around silver medallist, 1987 World all-around silver medallist, 1989 World all-around bronze medallist and the 1988 European all-around champion. She also won a gold medal at the 1987 World Championships with the rope. Her twin sister, Kamelia Dunavska, was also a competitive rhythmic gymnast.

== Biography ==
Dunavska was born on 21 April 1969. She was a star pupil at club CSKA in her hometown, where she was coached by Borislava Kuichkova until she was selected for the national team. She was one of the Golden Girls of Bulgaria that dominated Rhythmic Gymnastics in the 1980s. She made her international debut breakthrough with her 4th-place finish at the 1986 European Championships.

In 1984, rhythmic gymnastics officially became an Olympic sport . At the Olympics in Seoul, the Bulgarian gymnasts competed against Soviet gymnasts – Marina Lobach and Olexandra Tymoshenko. Her teammate Bianka Panova dropped a club in the preliminary competition, which eventually kept her out of the medals. Dunavska performed very well. She won the silver medal in the all-around competition behind soviet gymnast Marina Lobach. She was her country's only individual Olympic medallist in rhythmic gymnastics until Boryana Kaleyn took another silver medal in 2024.

Besides her Olympic silver from the 1988 Seoul Olympics, Dunavska had a successful career with many gold, silver and bronze medals at World and European championships. At the European Championships in Helsinki in 1988, she became the all-around gold medalist as well as winning gold with ribbon, clubs, and hoop. A year earlier, Dunavska was second at the 1987 World Championships in Varna.

The 1989 World Championships would be Dunavska's final competition. After winning the bronze in the all-around, she capped off her career by performing in all four event finals, where she won silvers with ball and ribbon.
