= Teresa Folga =

Polish rhythmic gymnast (born 1966)

- Born: 15 October 1966 (age 59) Kraków, Poland
- Height: 1.60 m (5 ft 3 in)

Gymnastics career
- Discipline: Rhythmic gymnastics
- Country represented: Poland
- Club: MK Krakusa Kraków

Teresa Folga-Theodoropoulos (born 15 October 1966) is a retired Polish rhythmic gymnast.

She competed for Poland in the rhythmic gymnastics all-around competition at the 1988 Summer Olympics, placing 7th overall. In the Seoul Olympic Village, she won a beauty pageant among all other female Olympians.
