= He Xiaomin =

Chinese rhythmic gymnast

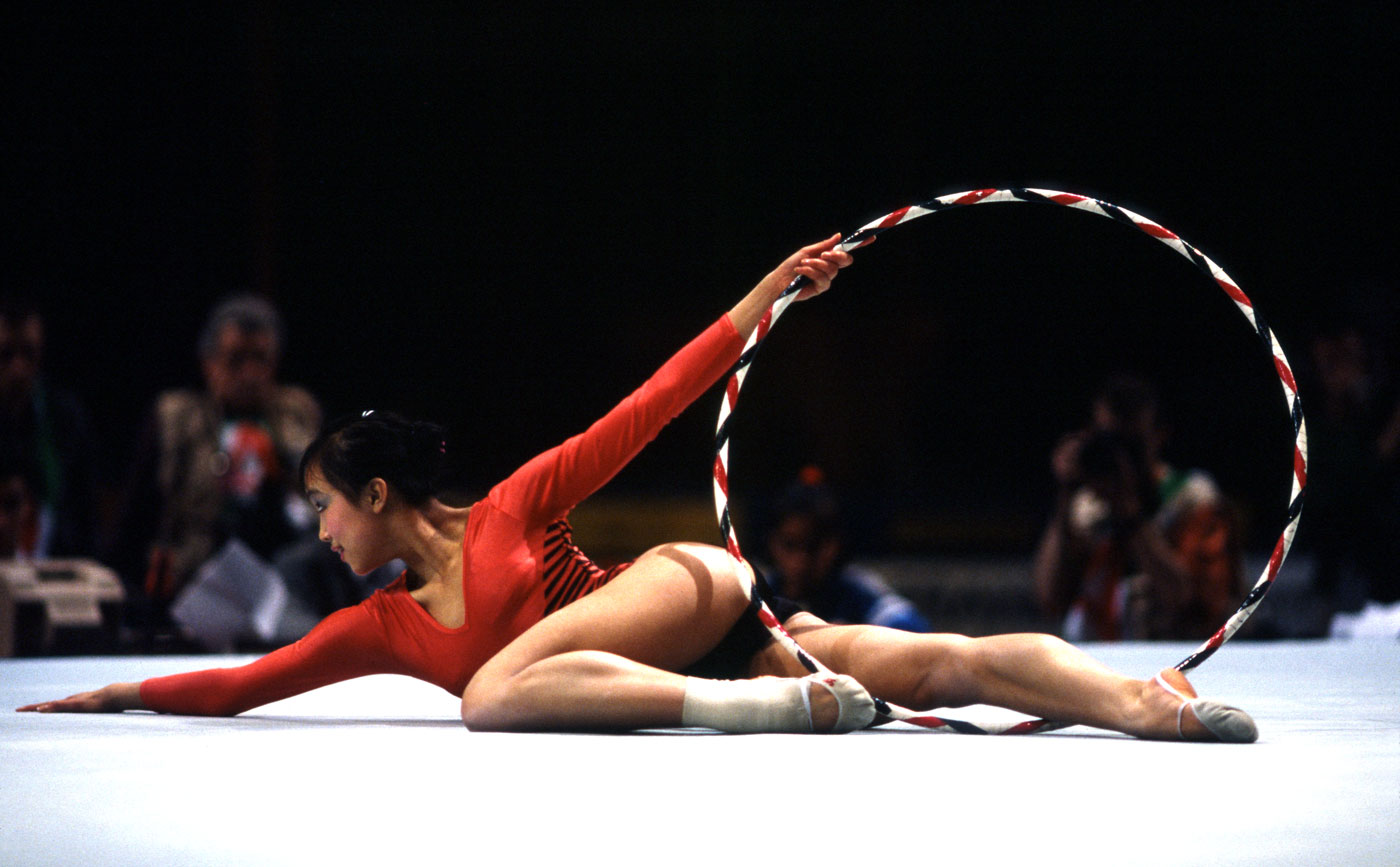
- He Xiaomin in 1990

Personal information
- Born: July 8, 1971 (age 55) Guilin, Guangxi, China
- Height: 161 cm (5 ft 3 in)

Gymnastics career
- Discipline: Rhythmic gymnastics
- Country represented: China
Medal record
Representing China
Summer Universiade
Silver medal – second place	1991 Sheffield	Ball
Silver medal – second place	1991 Sheffield	Rope
Bronze medal – third place	1991 Sheffield	All-around
Bronze medal – third place	1991 Sheffield	Hoop

He Xiaomin (Chinese: 何 曉敏; born July 8, 1971) is a retired Chinese rhythmic gymnast.

She competed for China in the rhythmic gymnastics all-around competition at the 1988 Summer Olympics in Seoul. She tied for 17th place in the qualification round and advanced to the final, ending up in 16th place overall.
