= Micaela Imperatori =

Italian rhythmic gymnast (born 1972)

- Born: 28 April 1972 (age 54) Rome, Italy
- Height: 1.65 m (5 ft 5 in)

Gymnastics career
- Discipline: Rhythmic gymnastics
- Country represented: Italy

Micaela Imperatori (born 28 April 1972 in Rome) is a retired Italian rhythmic gymnast.

She competed for Italy in the rhythmic gymnastics all-around competition at the 1988 Summer Olympics in Seoul, tying for 12th place overall.
