= María Martín (gymnast) =

Spanish rhythmic gymnast

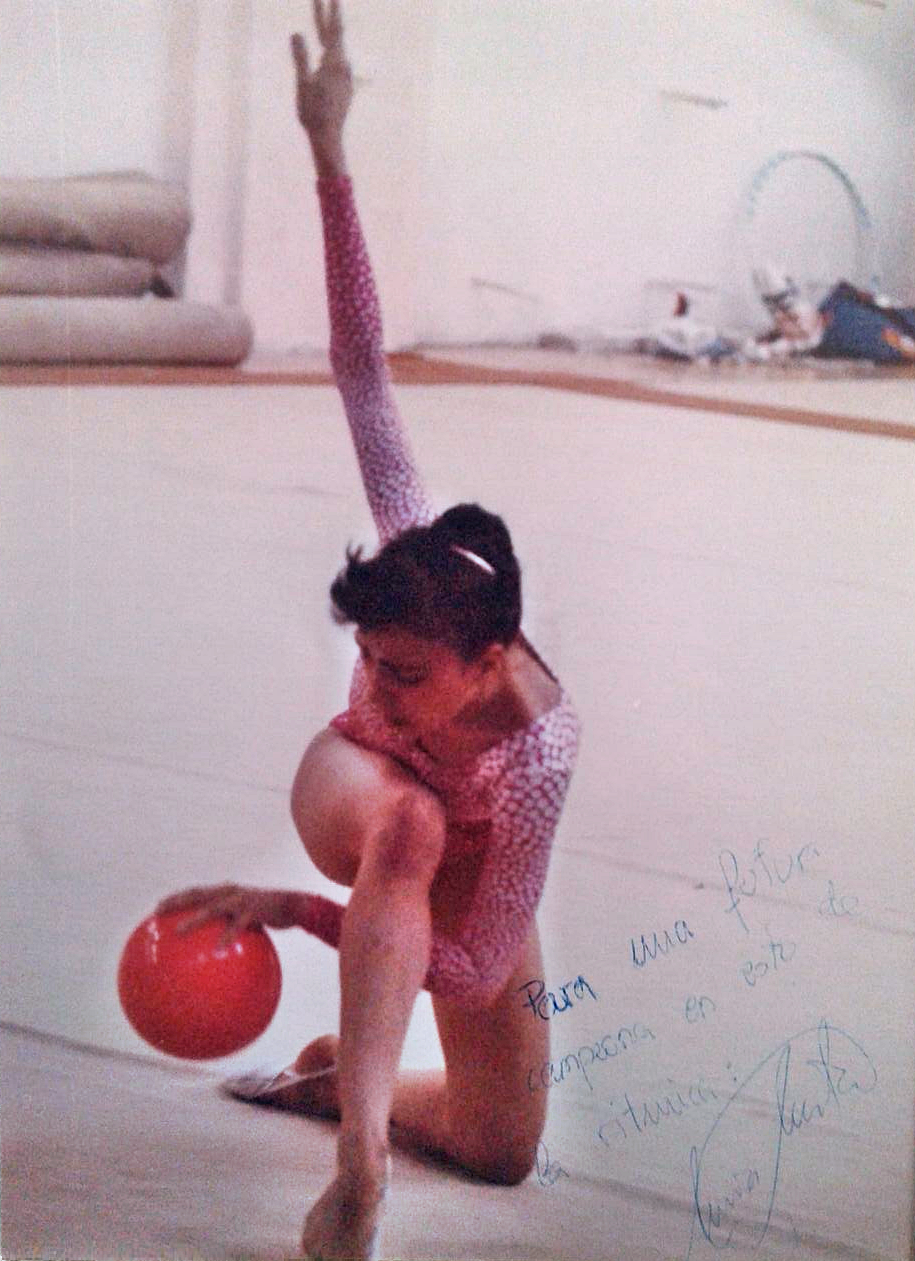

Personal information
- Full name: María Martín Rodríguez
- Born: 26 May 1970 (age 56) León
- Height: 162 cm (5 ft 4 in)

Gymnastics career
- Discipline: Rhythmic gymnastics
- Country represented: Spain

María Martín (born 26 May 1970 in León) is a retired Spanish rhythmic gymnast.

She competed for Spain in the rhythmic gymnastics all-around competition at the 1988 Summer Olympics in Seoul. She was 16th in the qualification and advanced to the final, placing 20th overall.
