= Shulamit Goldstein =

Israeli rhythmic gymnast (1968–2022)

- שולמית גולדשטיין
- Born: May 4, 1968
- Died: May 27, 2022 (aged 54)
- Height: 5.46 ft (166 cm)

Gymnastics career
- Discipline: Rhythmic gymnastics
- Country represented: Israel
- Club: Hapoel Azur

Shulamit Goldstein (Hebrew: שולמית גולדשטיין; May 4, 1968 – May 27, 2022) was an Israeli Olympic rhythmic gymnast.

== Career ==
Goldstein's club was Hapoel Azur. She was the Israeli national Rhythmic Gymnastics Champion between 1985 and 87. At the 1985 World Rhythmic Gymnastics Championships, she came in 49th.

She competed for Israel at the 1988 Summer Olympics in Seoul, South Korea, at the age of 20 in Rhythmic Gymnastics. In Women's Individual All-Around she came in tied for 35th. She came in 37th in Hoop, tied for 26th in Rope, 37th in Clubs, and tied for 34th in Ribbon. When she competed in the Olympics, she was 5 ft 5.5 in (166 cm) tall and weighed 112 lb (51 kg).

After her days competing, she became a commentator on the sport.
