= Patricia Jorge (rhythmic gymnast) =

Portuguese rhythmic gymnast

- Born: May 17, 1970 (age 56)
- Height: 172 cm (5 ft 8 in) (at the 1988 Olympics)

Gymnastics career
- Discipline: Rhythmic gymnastics
- Country represented: Portugal
- Club: Sport Algés e Dafundo, Algés, Oeiras

Patricia Jorge (May 17, 1970) is a Portuguese rhythmic gymnast.

Patricia Jorge competed for Portugal in the rhythmic gymnastics individual all-around competition at the 1988 Summer Olympics in Seoul. There she was 30th in the preliminary (qualification) round and did not advance to the final.
