= Diana Schmiemann =

German rhythmic gymnast (born 1972)

- Born: 2 March 1972 (age 54) Wickede-Wimbern, North Rhine-Westphalia, West Germany
- Height: 1.67 m (5 ft 5 1/2 in)

Gymnastics career
- Discipline: Rhythmic gymnastics
- Country represented: Germany
- Club: TV Wattenscheid

Diana Schmiemann (born 2 March 1972 in Wickede-Wimbern, North Rhine-Westphalia, West Germany) is a retired German rhythmic gymnast.

She competed for West Germany in the rhythmic gymnastics all-around competition at the 1988 Summer Olympics in Seoul, placing 8th overall.
