= Lisa Black (rhythmic gymnast) =

British rhythmic gymnast (born 1967)

- Full name: Julie Lisa Black
- Born: 3 June 1967 (age 59) Tring, Hertfordshire, Great Britain
- Height: 164 cm (5 ft 5 in) (at the 1988 Olympics)

Gymnastics career
- Discipline: Rhythmic gymnastics
- Country represented: Great Britain
- Club: Northampton RGC, Northampton

Julie Lisa Black (born 3 June 1967 in Tring, Hertfordshire) is a British rhythmic gymnast.

Black competed for Great Britain in the rhythmic gymnastics individual all-around competition at the 1988 Summer Olympics in Seoul. There she was 38th in the preliminary (qualification) round and did not advance to the final.
