= Laurence Brihaye =

Belgian rhythmic gymnast (born 1969)

- Born: September 2, 1969 (age 57) Saint-Josse-ten-Noode, Brussels-Capital Region, Belgium
- Height: 166 cm (5 ft 5 in) (at the 1988 Olympics)

Gymnastics career
- Discipline: Rhythmic gymnastics
- Country represented: Belgium
- Club: GYM 2000

Laurence Brihaye (September 2, 1969 in Saint-Josse-ten-Noode) is a Belgian rhythmic gymnast.

Brihaye competed for Belgium in the rhythmic gymnastics individual all-around competition at the 1988 Summer Olympics in Seoul. There she tied for 27th place in the preliminary (qualification) round and did not advance to the final.
