= Nóra Érfalvy =

Hungarian rhythmic gymnast

- Born: 9 June 1970 (age 56) Budapest, Hungary
- Height: 1.66 m (5 ft 5 1/2 in)

Gymnastics career
- Discipline: Rhythmic gymnastics
- Country represented: Hungary
- Club: Óbudai TSZ Sportegyesület

Nóra Érfalvy (born 9 June 1970 in Budapest) is a retired Hungarian rhythmic gymnast.

She competed for Hungary in the rhythmic gymnastics all-around competition at the 1988 Olympic Games in Seoul, placing 20th in the qualification and 17th overall.

After her competitive career, Érfalvy became a rhythmic gymnastics coach. She has served as the head coach of Óbuda-Kalász RG TC, a Budapest-based club founded under her leadership in 1994. The club also organizes the international Óbuda Cup rhythmic gymnastics tournament.
