= Diane Simpson-Bundy =

American rhythmic gymnast

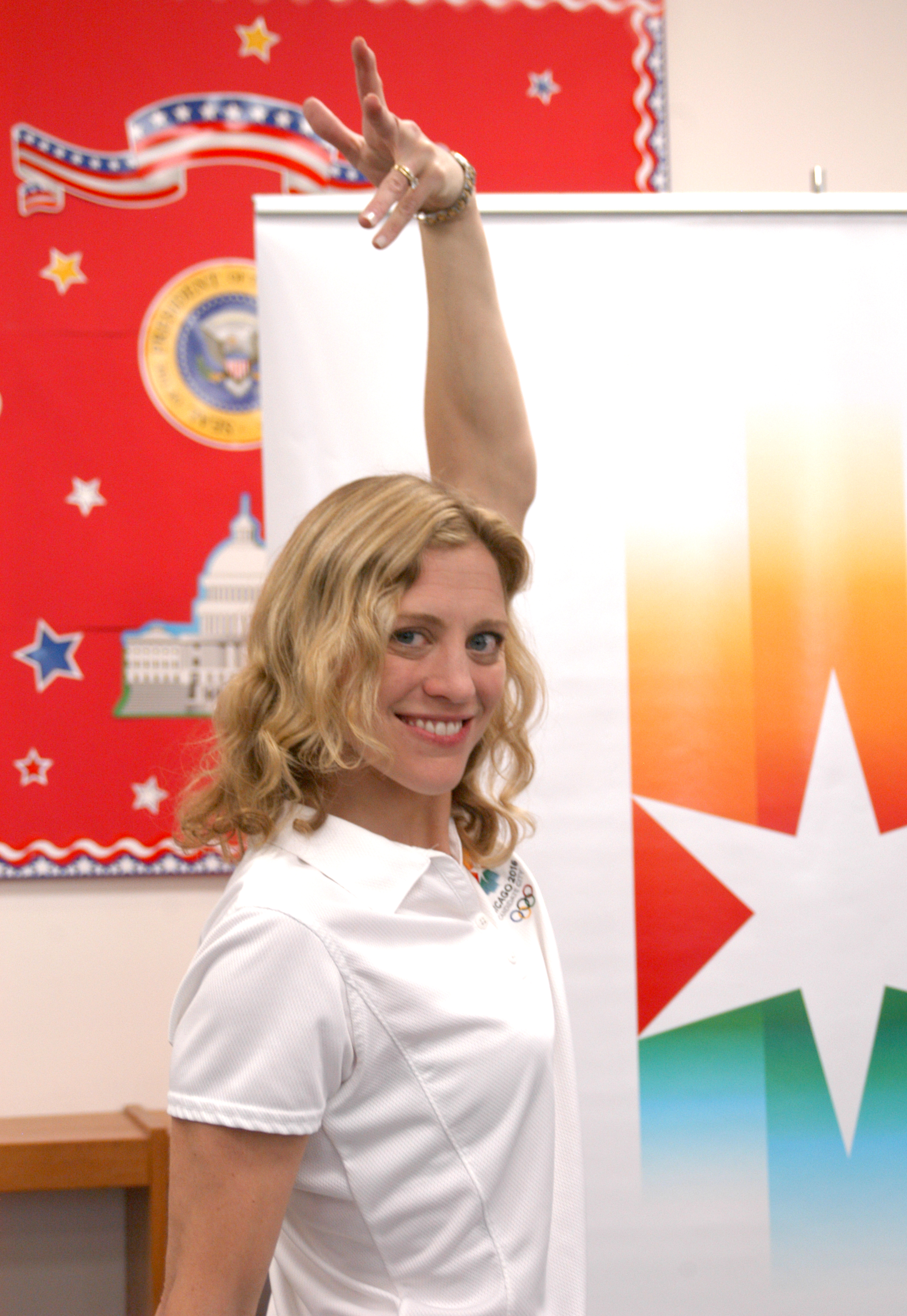
- Simpson in 2016

Personal information
- Full name: Diane Simpson

Gymnastics career
- Discipline: Rhythmic gymnastics
- Country represented: United States

Diane Simpson (born April 7, 1969, in Evanston, Illinois) is an American rhythmic gymnast who competed at the 1988 Summer Olympics. She was inducted into the USA Gymnastics Hall of Fame in 2004. She now works in media.

Simpson was the first rhythmic gymnast to twice qualify a spot for the United States, for the 1988 Summer Olympics and 1992 Summer Olympics.

== Competitive career ==
Simpson began rhythmic gymnastics when she was 13. During her career, Simpson won more than 20 international medals, three Olympic Festival titles, and 22 national titles. She won all four event finals and the all-around title at the 1988 U.S. National Championships.

Simpson competed at four World Championships from 1985 to 1991, along with the 1986 Goodwill Games, the 1986, 1988, and 1990 Four Continents Championships, and the 1987 Pan American Games, where she won two gold medals in rope and ribbon and two silver medals in the all-around and hoop final.

She was one of two American gymnasts who competed at the 1988 Summer Olympics after tying for first place at the U.S. National Championships with Michelle Berube in a close competition. She placed 26th after competing on an ulcer.

After the Olympics, she competed at the 1990 Goodwill Games and the 1991 Pan American Games, where she won bronze in the team event. At the event, she fainted due to hypoglycemia and an electrolyte imbalance; she had lost a large amount of weight due to a longstanding eating disorder. In 1992, she did not train much from January to May due to various health issues, and she placed fourth at the 1992 Olympic Trials after five weeks of training. She was not selected for the team.

She was inducted into the USA Gymnastics Hall of Fame in 2004.

== Post-competitive career ==
After her competitive career, she became a qualified judge and worked in gymnastics media; she has worked as a commentator for the USA Gymnastics Junior Olympics Program and worked with NBC during their gymnastics coverage at the 2000 Summer Olympics.

Simpson was president of the Midwest Chapter of U.S. Olympians and Paralympians, a regional chapter of the U.S. Olympians Association. She also previously served as secretary of the Female Athlete Triad Coalition, now the Female and Male Athlete Triad Coalition.

=== Chicago 2016 Olympics bid ===
Simpson held the role of manager of athlete relations and communications for the Chicago bid for the 2016 Summer Olympics from 2006 to 2009. She was one of about 20 Olympians and elite athletes who traveled to Copenhagen, Denmark, for the 2016 Olympic Games host city announcement that took place Oct. 2, 2009.

== Personal life ==
Simpson has a sister and a brother. She has two children with her husband, Alexis and Jonathan.

== See also ==
- List of gymnasts
- Rhythmic Gymnastics World Championships
- Fédération Internationale de Gymnastique
- Olympians for Olympians Fund
