= Dara Terzić Šterić =

- Born: December 22, 1970 (age 55)

Gymnastics career
- Discipline: Rhythmic gymnastics
- Country represented: Yugoslavia

Dara Terzić Šterić (Serbian: Дара Терзић Штерић) (December 22, 1970) is a Serbian rhythmic gymnast. As a 17th year old girl, she represented Yugoslavia at the 1988 Summer Olympics in Seoul.

She works as a coach in the Rhythmic gymnastics club Palilula in Belgrade.
