= Embassy of the Philippines, Bucharest =

Diplomatic mission of the Philippines in Romania

Embassy of the Philippines, Bucharest Pasuguan ng Pilipinas sa Bukarest Ambasada Filipinelor la București

- Location: Bucharest
- Address: Calea Floreasca nr. 246C, Sector 2
- Coordinates: 44°28′41.4″N 26°6′17.8″E
- Ambassador: Noel Eugene Eusebio M. Servigon

The Embassy of the Philippines in Bucharest is the diplomatic mission of the Republic of the Philippines to Romania. It is located on the 24th floor of the Floreasca SkyTower in the neighborhood of Floreasca, part of Sector 2 in northern Bucharest.

Although the current embassy dates from 2024, the Philippines also maintained a previous resident embassy in Romania between 1975 and 2012.

== History ==
Diplomatic relations between the Philippines and Romania were established on March 10, 1972, the first country in the Eastern Bloc to do so, and beginning a broader push during the presidency of Ferdinand Marcos to normalize relations between the Philippines and countries within the bloc. Although relations were initially conducted through the Philippine Mission in Geneva, a resident embassy in Romania was later opened in March 1975, a month after the opening of the Romanian Embassy in Manila, with Leticia Ramos-Shahani serving as the Philippines' first ambassador to Romania as well as the first woman to serve as ambassador to a country in the bloc.

After a massive expansion of the Philippines' diplomatic presence abroad during the presidency of Gloria Macapagal Arroyo, in 2010 Senator Franklin Drilon questioned the need for embassies in countries with small Filipino communities, including a number of countries in Europe, and called for a review of the Philippines' diplomatic presence worldwide. This would lead to the closure of ten posts under Arroyo's successor, Benigno Aquino III, and ultimately to the closure of the embassy on October 31, 2012. While it was closed, all three countries where it exercised jurisdiction were placed under the jurisdiction of the Philippine Embassy in Budapest.

On November 15, 2022, during budget deliberations for the Department of Foreign Affairs (DFA), Senator Loren Legarda announced that the embassy was one of four missions that would reopen in 2024 as part of an expansion of the Philippines' diplomatic presence under Bongbong Marcos. This was later confirmed by the Budapest mission on January 29, 2024 when, during its annual consular outreach mission in Bucharest, it noted that this would be its last consular mission owing to the embassy's impending reopening later in the year, and the DFA itself confirmed the reopening on June 21, 2024 during the opening of a new honorary consulate in Brașov.

The advance team setting up the embassy announced that they had arrived in Bucharest on September 14, 2024, and are preparing to immediately begin offering consular services once the mission has completed all the required procedures for opening. Limited consular services began to be offered on October 23, 2024, and the embassy fully opened some two weeks later on November 4, 2024.

== Chancery ==
Until its closure in 2012, the chancery of the Philippine Embassy in Bucharest was located on Strada Carol Davila in Cotroceni, part of Sector 5 in the western part of Bucharest, between the Bucharest Botanical Garden and the Cotroceni Palace.

With its reopening, it set up a new temporary chancery at a space leased from serviced office provider Regus in the Floreasca Plaza Centre, located in the Aviației neighborhood of neighboring Sector 1, until it relocated across the street to a new permanent chancery on the 24th floor of the Floreasca SkyTower, part of the Floreasca City Center development, on June 2, 2025. The flag of the Philippines was then raised the following day for the first time over Romanian territory since 2012, formalizing its opening.

== Staff and activities ==
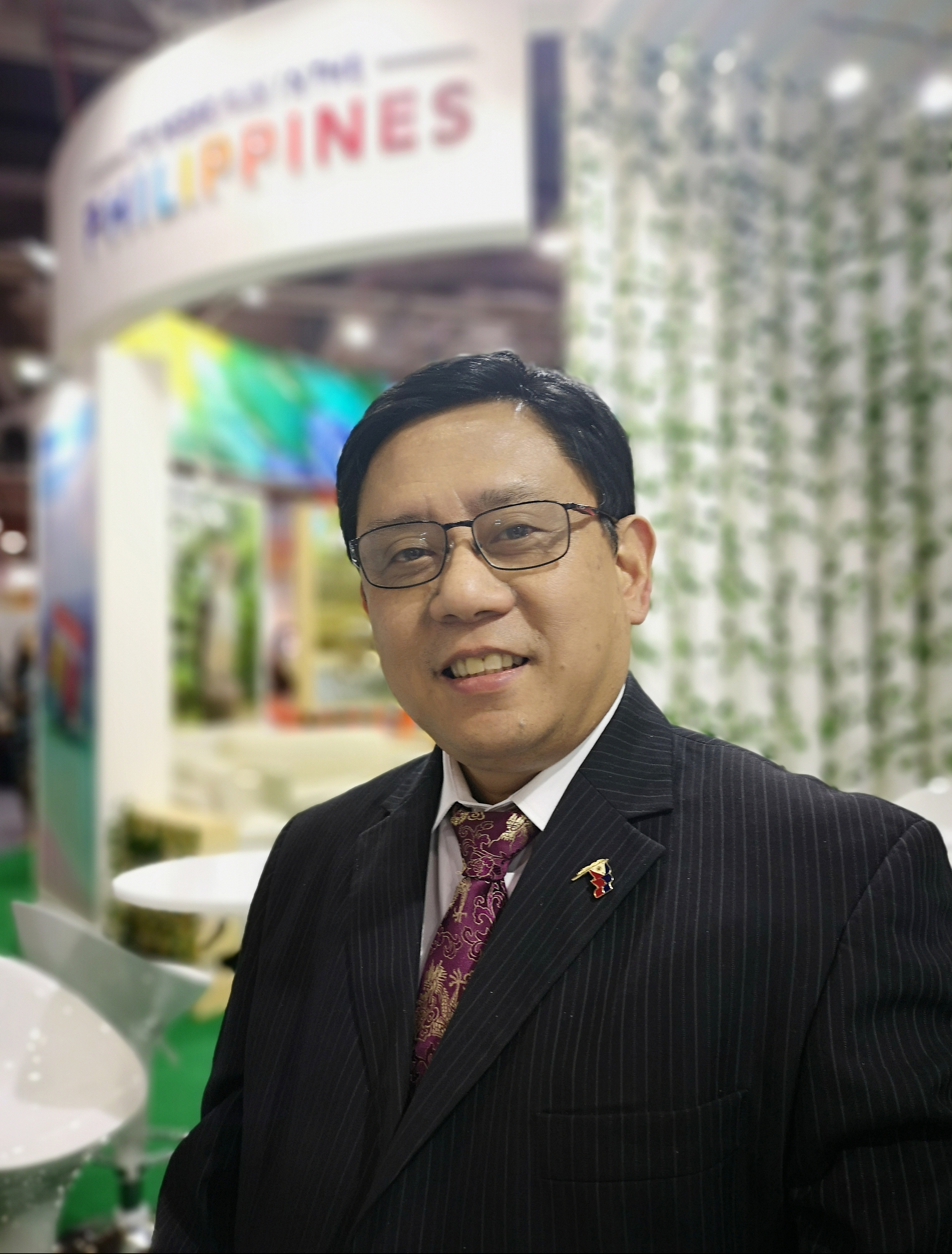
Servigon in 2019, at the time serving as ambassador to Vietnam

The Philippine Embassy in Bucharest is headed by Ambassador Noel Eugene Eusebio M. Servigon, who was appointed to the position by President Marcos on June 11, 2024. Prior to his appointment as ambassador, Servigon, a career diplomat, served as the Permanent Representative of the Philippines to the Association of Southeast Asian Nations, and before that was deployed to the Philippine Embassy in Hanoi as ambassador to Vietnam. His appointment was confirmed by the Commission on Appointments on August 7, 2024, and he presented his credentials to Romanian President Klaus Iohannis on November 26, 2024, one of the last ambassadors to do so during his tenure.

Other notable diplomats who have been deployed to the embassy include future Foreign Affairs Secretary Delia Albert, who was one of the first Filipino diplomats assigned to Romania.

In addition to conducting relations with Romania, the embassy is also responsible for the Philippines' relations with neighboring Bulgaria and Moldova, which were formally placed under the mission's jurisdiction on November 27, 2024, and which were likewise under its jurisdiction when it was previously open.

== See also ==
- Philippines–Romania relations
- List of diplomatic missions of the Philippines
