= Aviației =

District in Bucharest, Romania

Coordinates: 44°28′52.85″N 26°5′47.67″E

Aviației district on the map of Bucharest

Oracle Tower

Aviației is a district divided between Sector 1 and Sector 2 of Bucharest, mainly in Sector 1. Its name references the district's proximity to Aurel Vlaicu International Airport in neighbouring Băneasa district. The Ceaușescu regime developed the area as a neighbourhood for pilots and employees of the airport.

Several streets in the district are named for aviators including aviation pioneers Traian Vuia, Aurel Vlaicu, and Henri Coandă, as well as Nicolae Caranfil Minister of Air and Marine in the Third Tătărăscu cabinet, and Alexandru Șerbănescu Romanian fighter pilot and flying ace in World War II.

In the 2000s, the area has become increasingly upmarket, due to the construction of various luxury apartment developments in and around it (as are those in the Pipera–Tunari area). It is also home to many villas constructed before the 1930s that were refurbished in the 1990s and 2000s.

Notable buildings:

- Oracle Tower
- Authoritatea pentru Valorificarea Activelor Statului (AVAS)
- National Museum of Romanian Aviation
- Floreasca City Center

== The development of the district ==
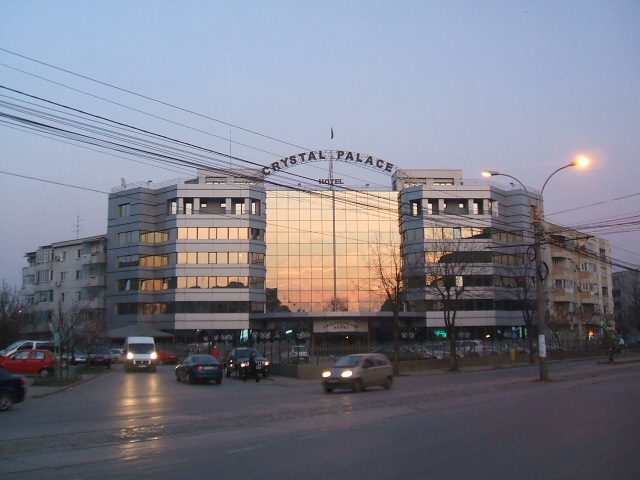
Crystal Palace Hotel in Aviației

In the recent years, several business centers and bank offices were built in this area. In 2008, the Floreasca City Center complex (which includes a 37-story office building) was started. This development burdened road traffic and motivated the authorities to make the system more fluid. Thus, several streets have become one-way streets.
