= List of diplomatic missions in Romania =

This is a list of diplomatic missions in Romania. There are 86 diplomatic missions in Bucharest and many countries maintain consulates in other major cities. Also, several other countries have non-resident embassies accredited from other European capitals.

This listing excludes honorary consulates.

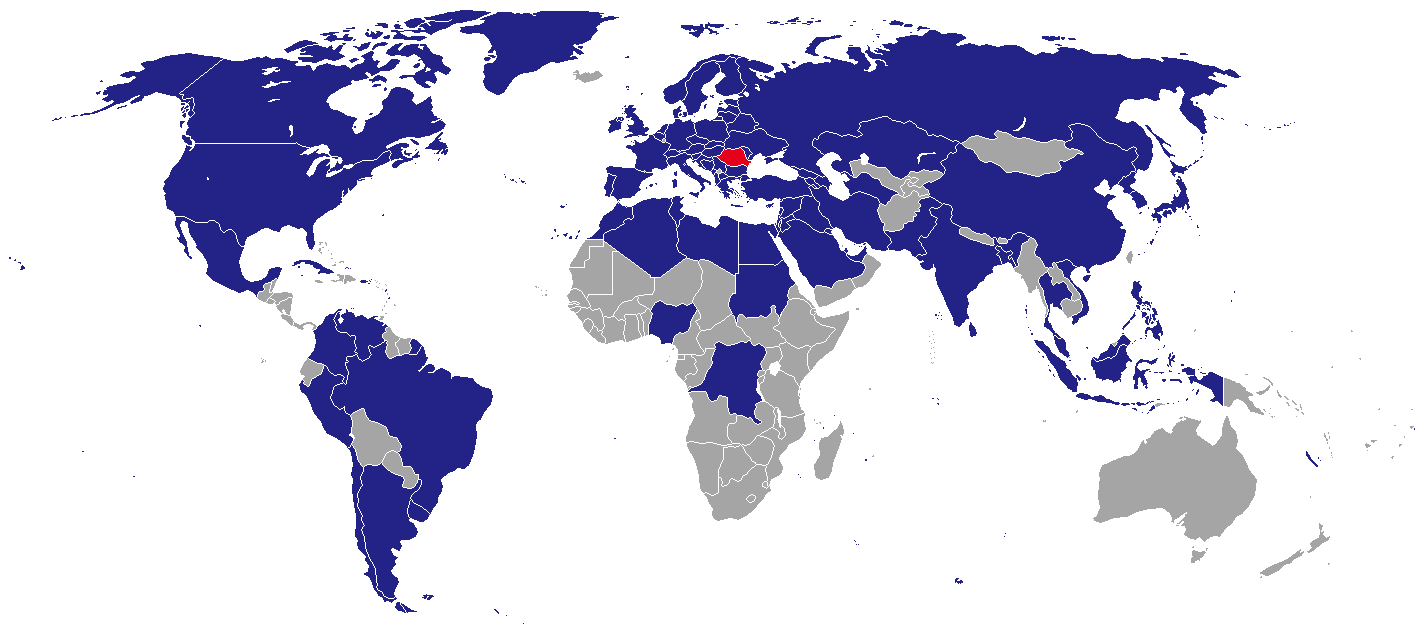
Countries with diplomatic missions in Romania

== Diplomatic missions in Bucharest ==
=== Embassies ===
1. Albania
2. Algeria
3. Argentina
4. Armenia
5. Austria
6. Azerbaijan
7. Bangladesh
8. Belarus
9. Belgium
10. Bosnia and Herzegovina
11. Brazil
12. Bulgaria
13. Canada
14. Chile
15. China
16. Colombia
17. Congo-Kinshasa
18. Croatia
19. Cuba
20. Cyprus
21. Czech Republic
22. Denmark
23. Egypt
24. Estonia
25. Finland
26. France
27. Georgia
28. Germany
29. Greece
30. Holy See
31. Hungary
32. India
33. Indonesia
34. Iran
35. Iraq
36. Ireland
37. Israel
38. Italy
39. Japan
40. Jordan
41. Kazakhstan
42. Kuwait
43. Lebanon
44. Libya
45. Lithuania
46. Malaysia
47. Mexico
48. Moldova
49. Montenegro
50. Morocco
51. Netherlands
52. Nigeria
53. North Korea
54. North Macedonia
55. Norway
56. Pakistan
57. Palestine
58. Peru
59. Philippines (article)
60. Poland
61. Portugal
62. Qatar
63. Russia
64. Saudi Arabia
65. Serbia
66. Slovakia
67. Slovenia
68. South Korea
69. Sovereign Military Order of Malta
70. Spain
71. Sri Lanka
72. Sudan
73. Sweden
74. Switzerland
75. Syria
76. Thailand
77. Tunisia
78. Turkey
79. Turkmenistan
80. Ukraine
81. United Arab Emirates
82. United Kingdom
83. United States
84. Uruguay
85. Venezuela
86. Vietnam

=== Other posts ===
- European Union (Delegation)

=== Gallery ===
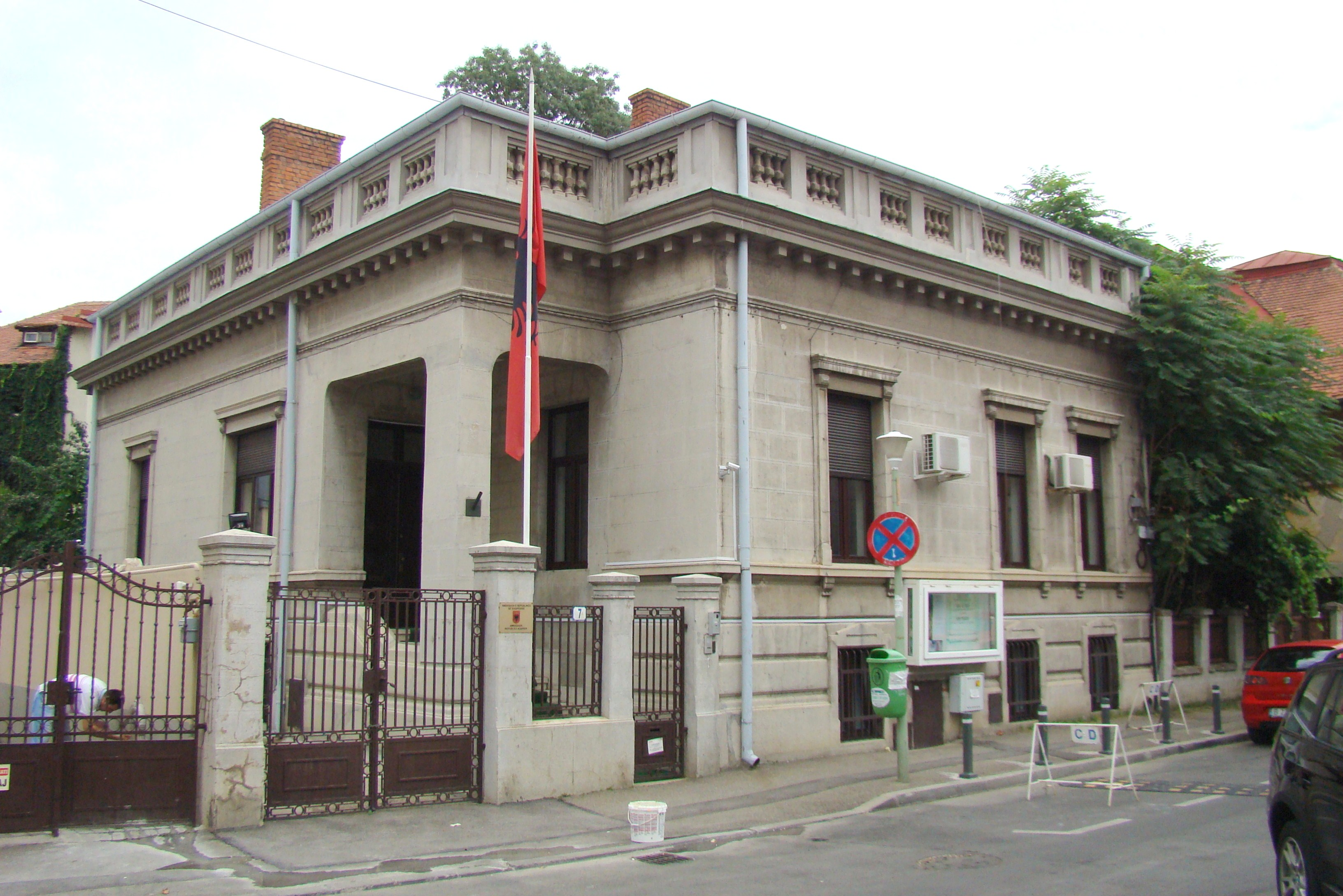
Embassy of Albania

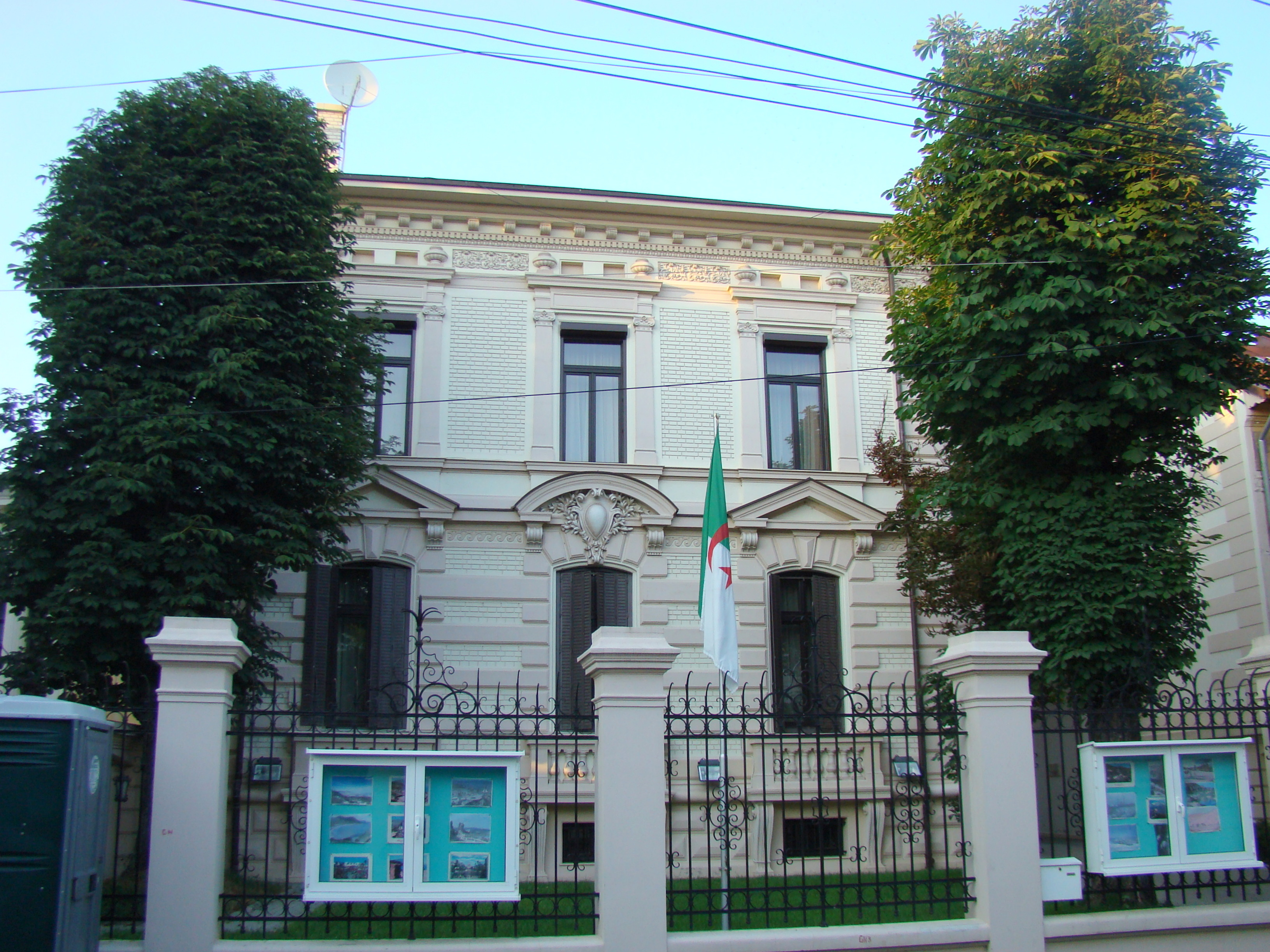
Embassy of Algeria

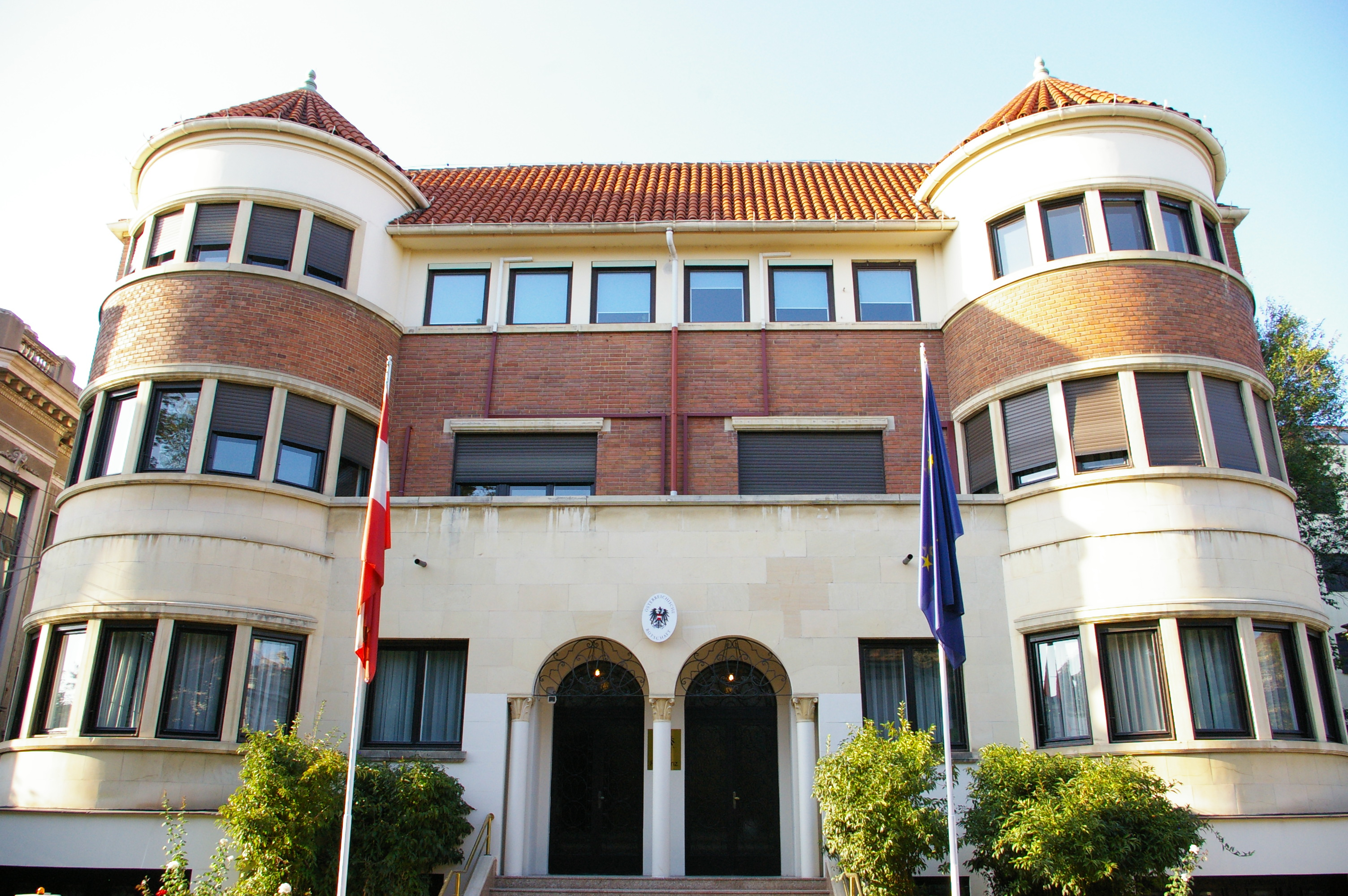
Embassy of Austria

Building hosting the Embassy of Brazil

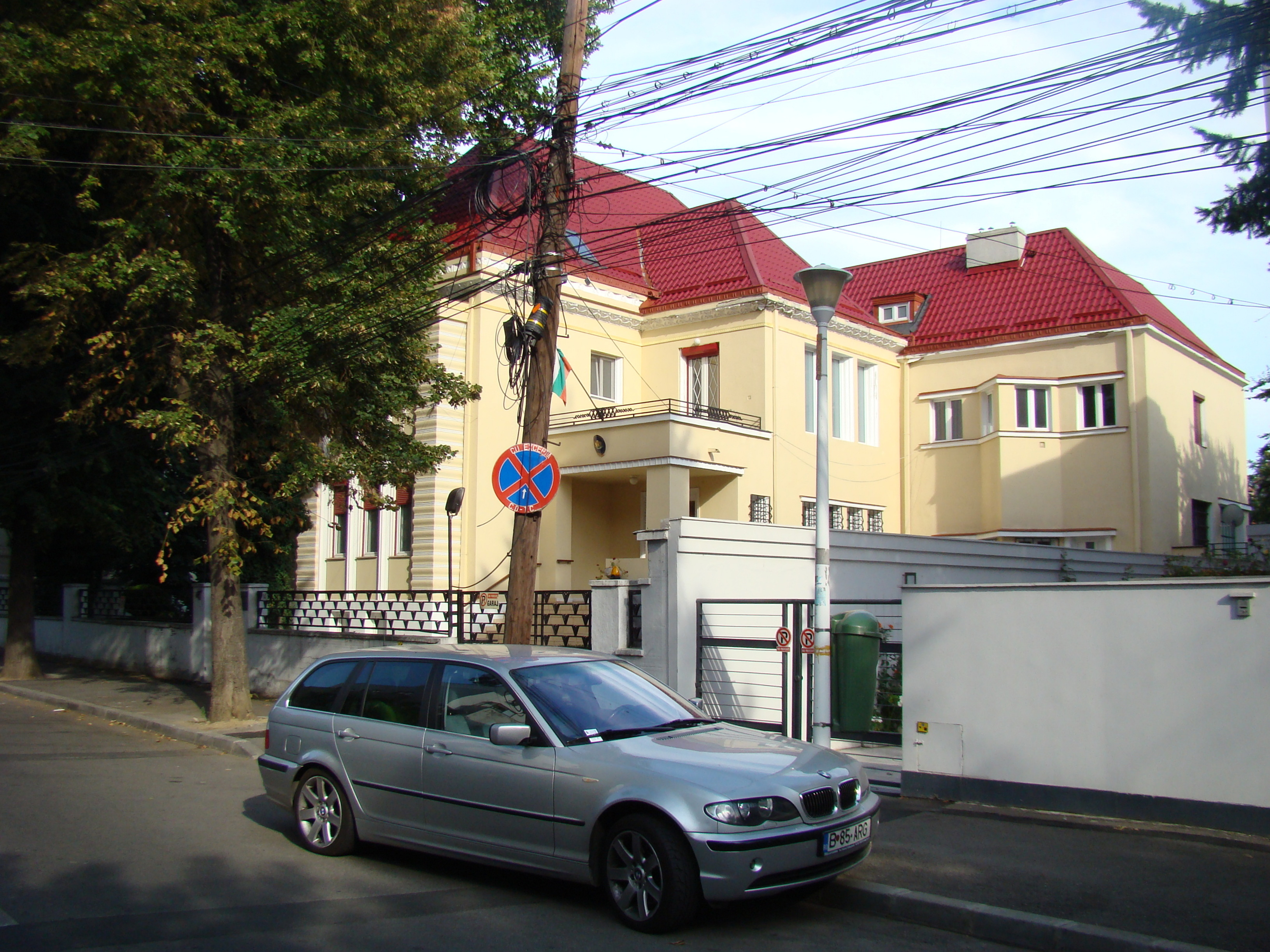
Embassy of Bulgaria

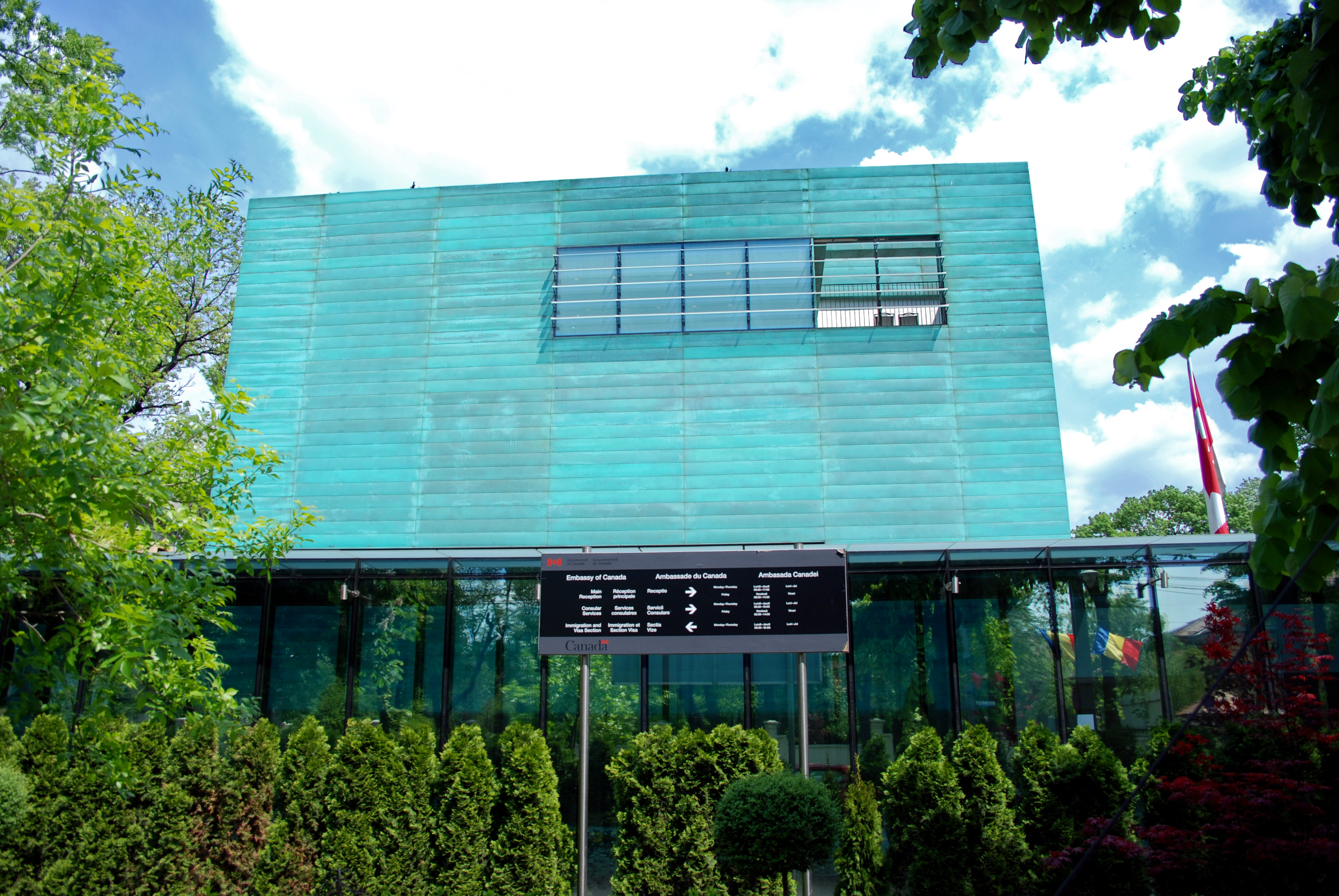
Embassy of Canada

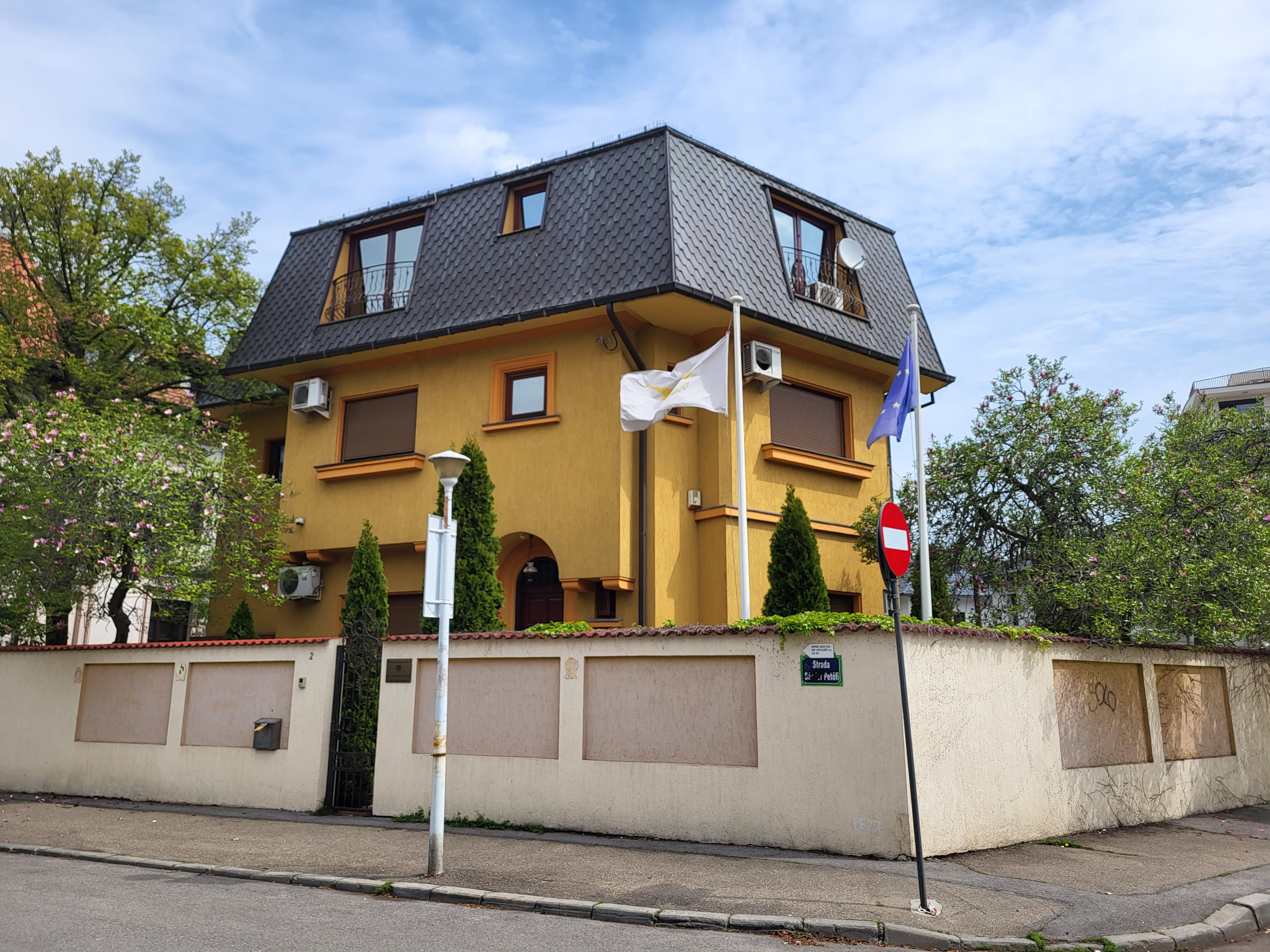
Embassy of Cyprus

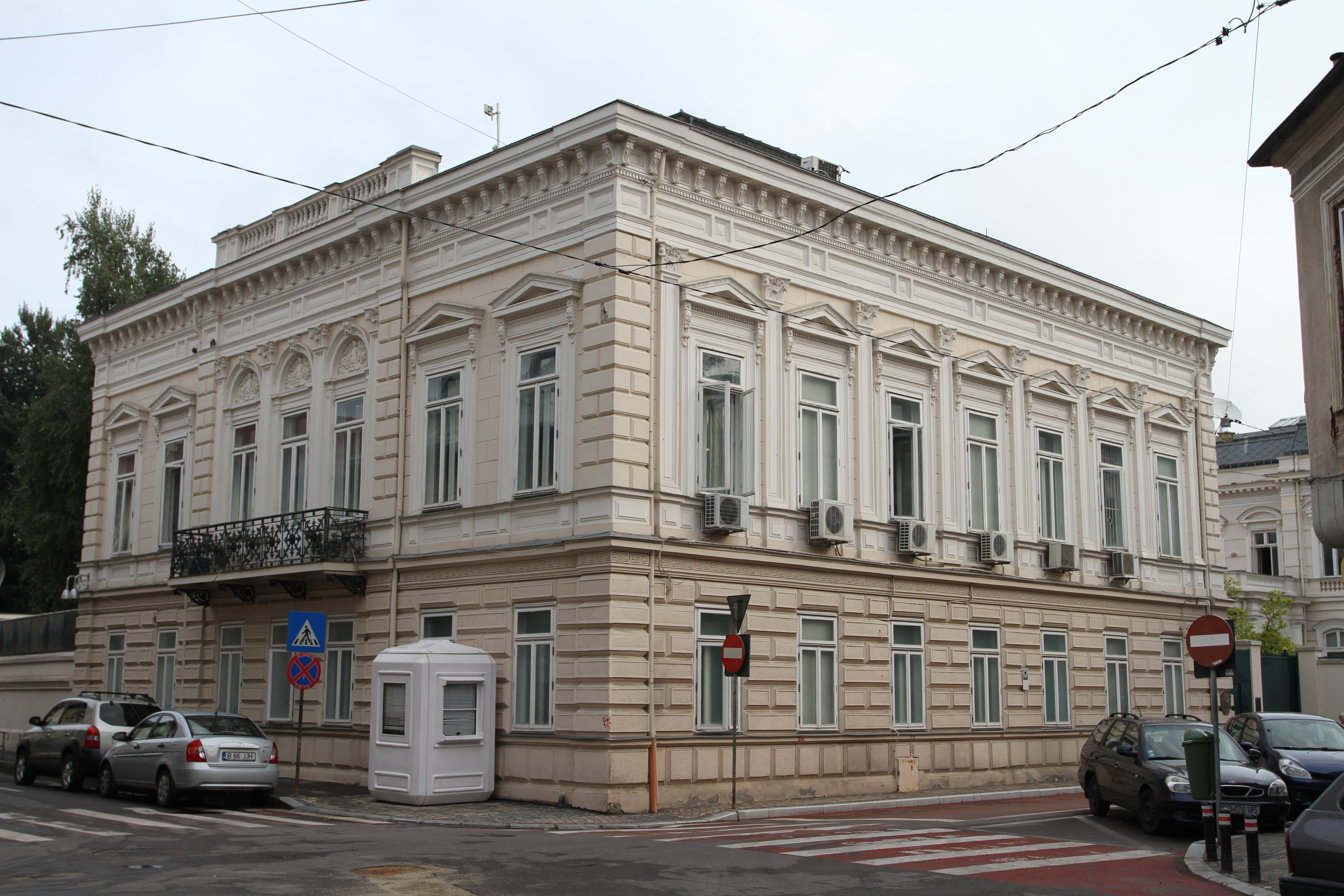
Embassy of France

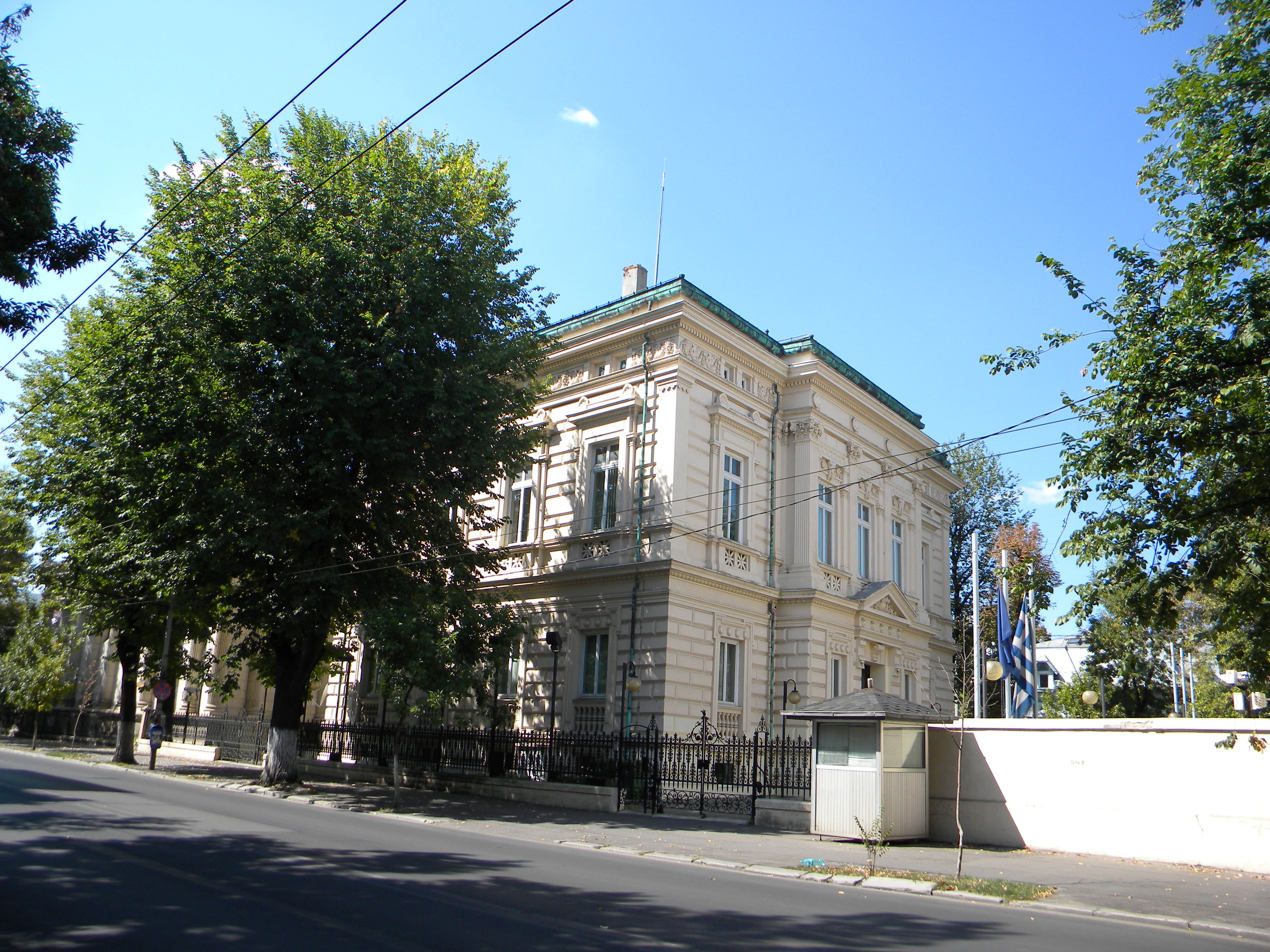
Embassy of Greece

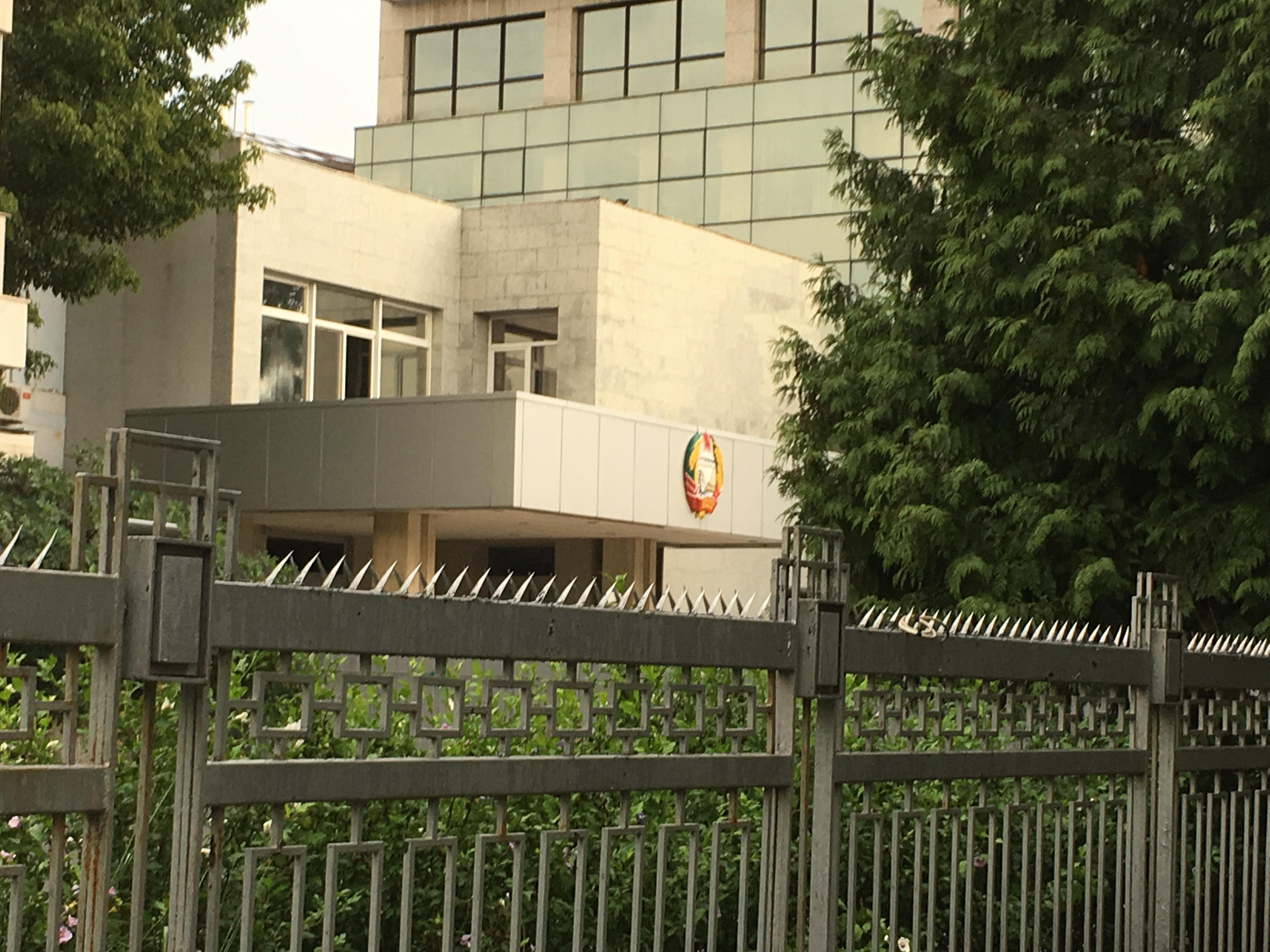
Embassy of North Korea

Building hosting the Embassy of the Philippines and South Korea

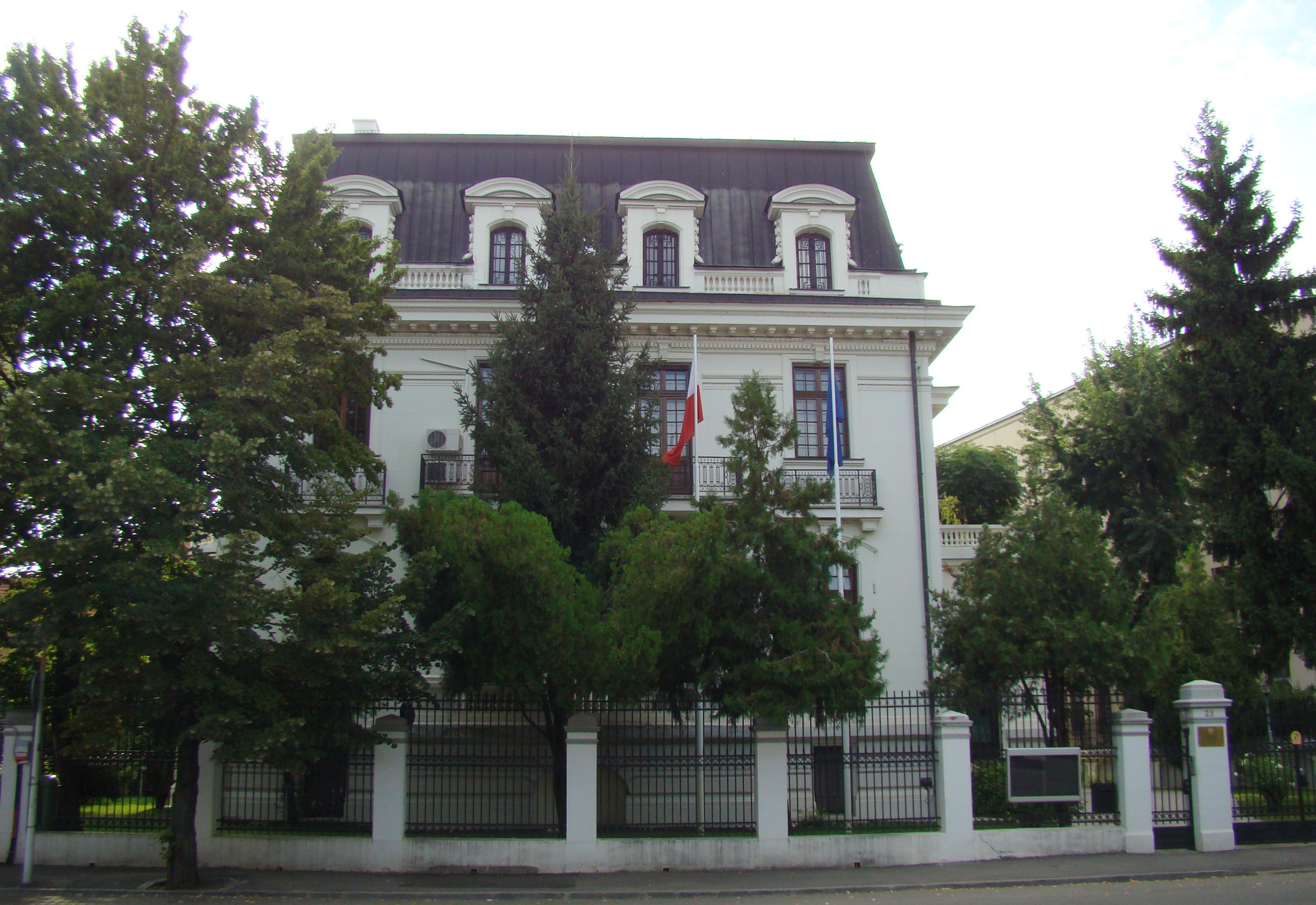
Embassy of Poland

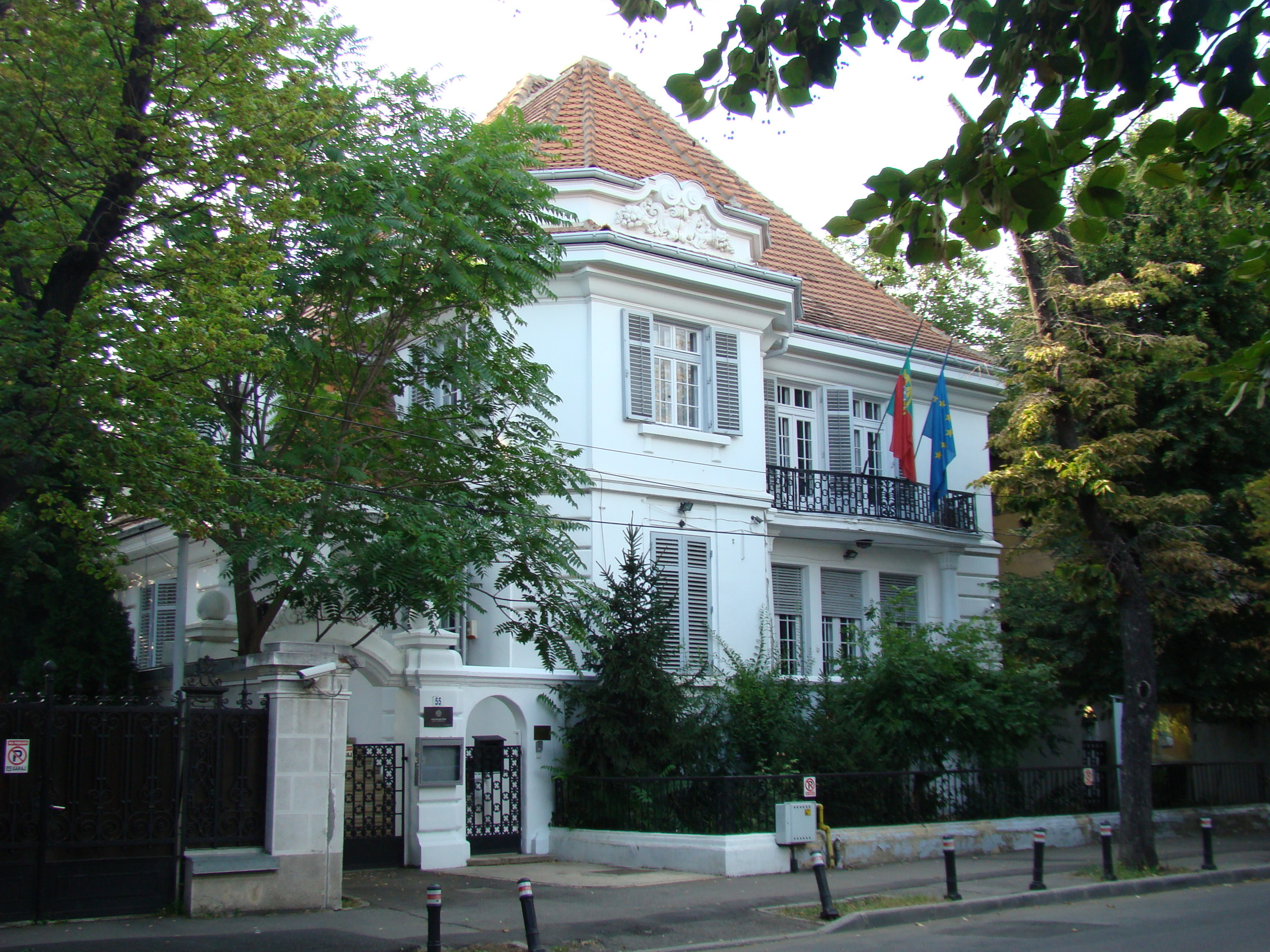
Embassy of Portugal

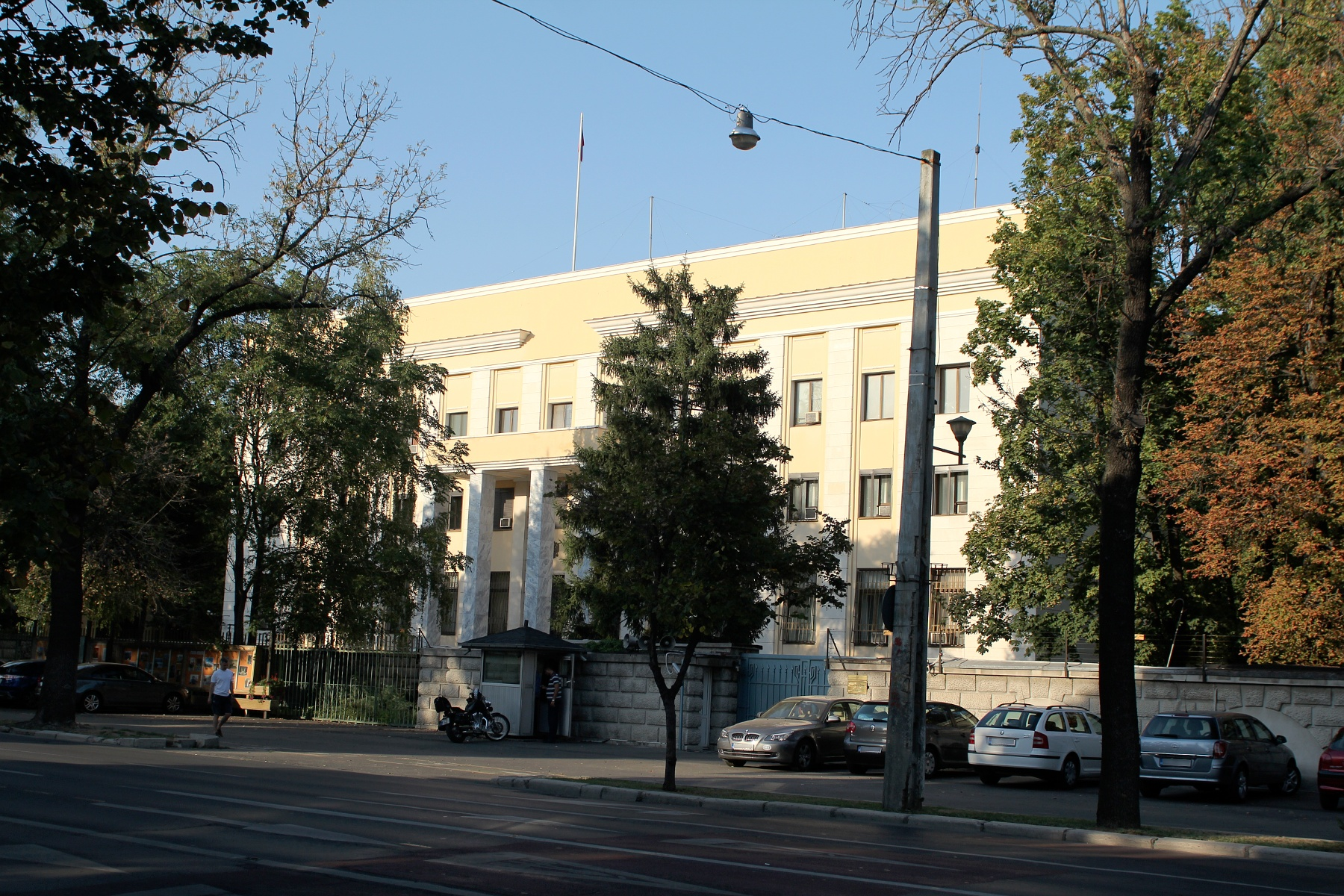
Embassy of Russia

Embassy of Serbia

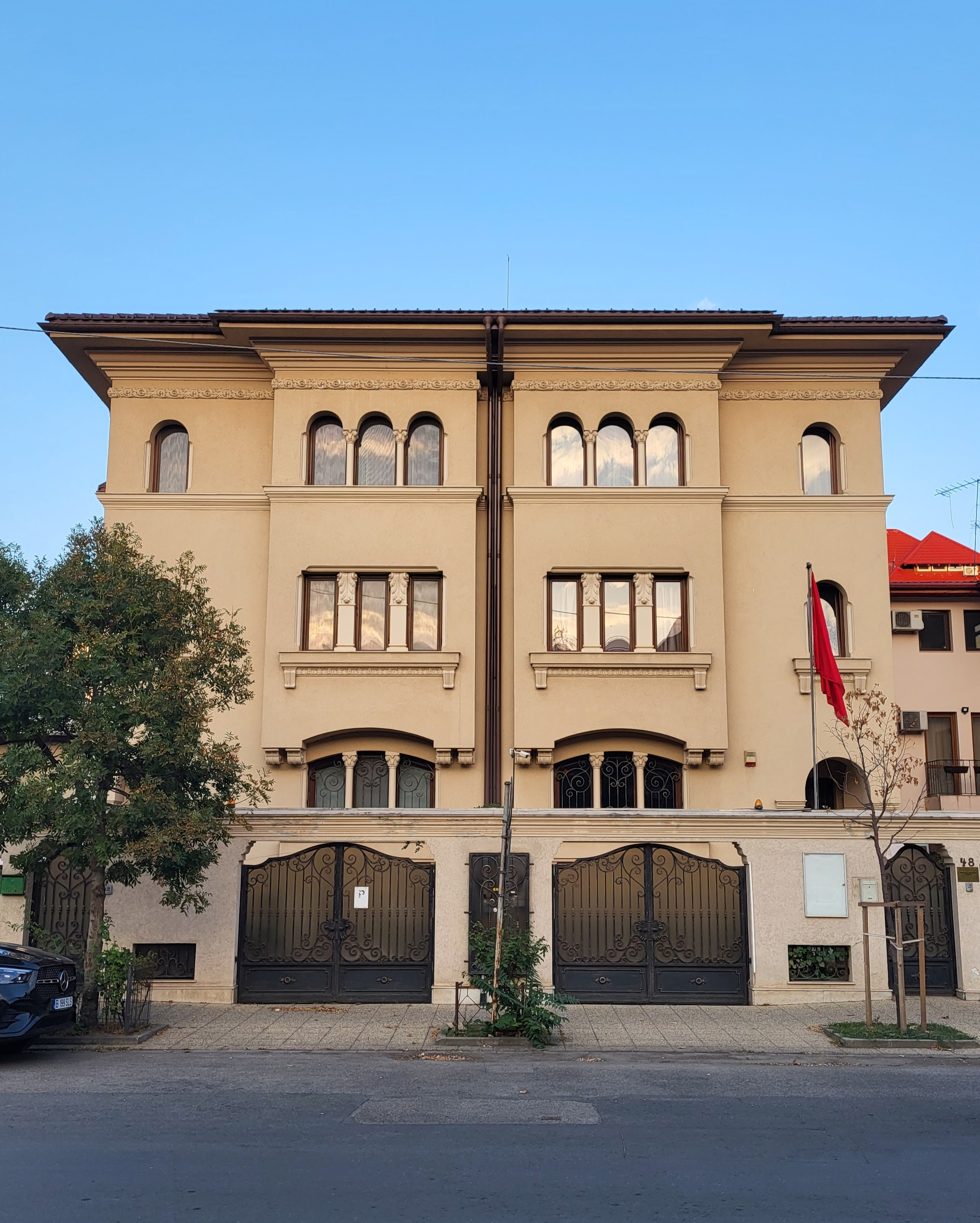
Embassy of Tunisia

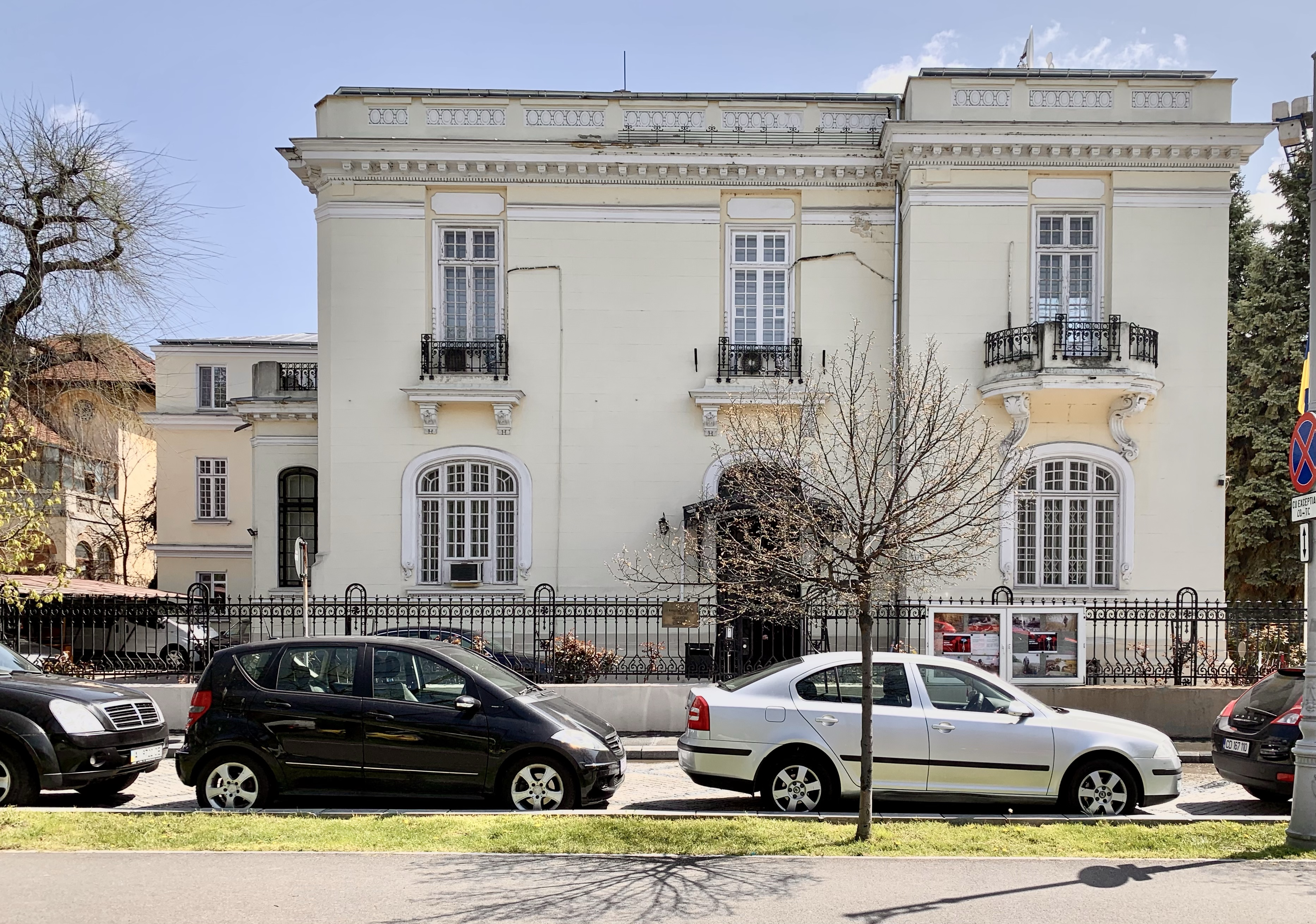
Embassy of Ukraine

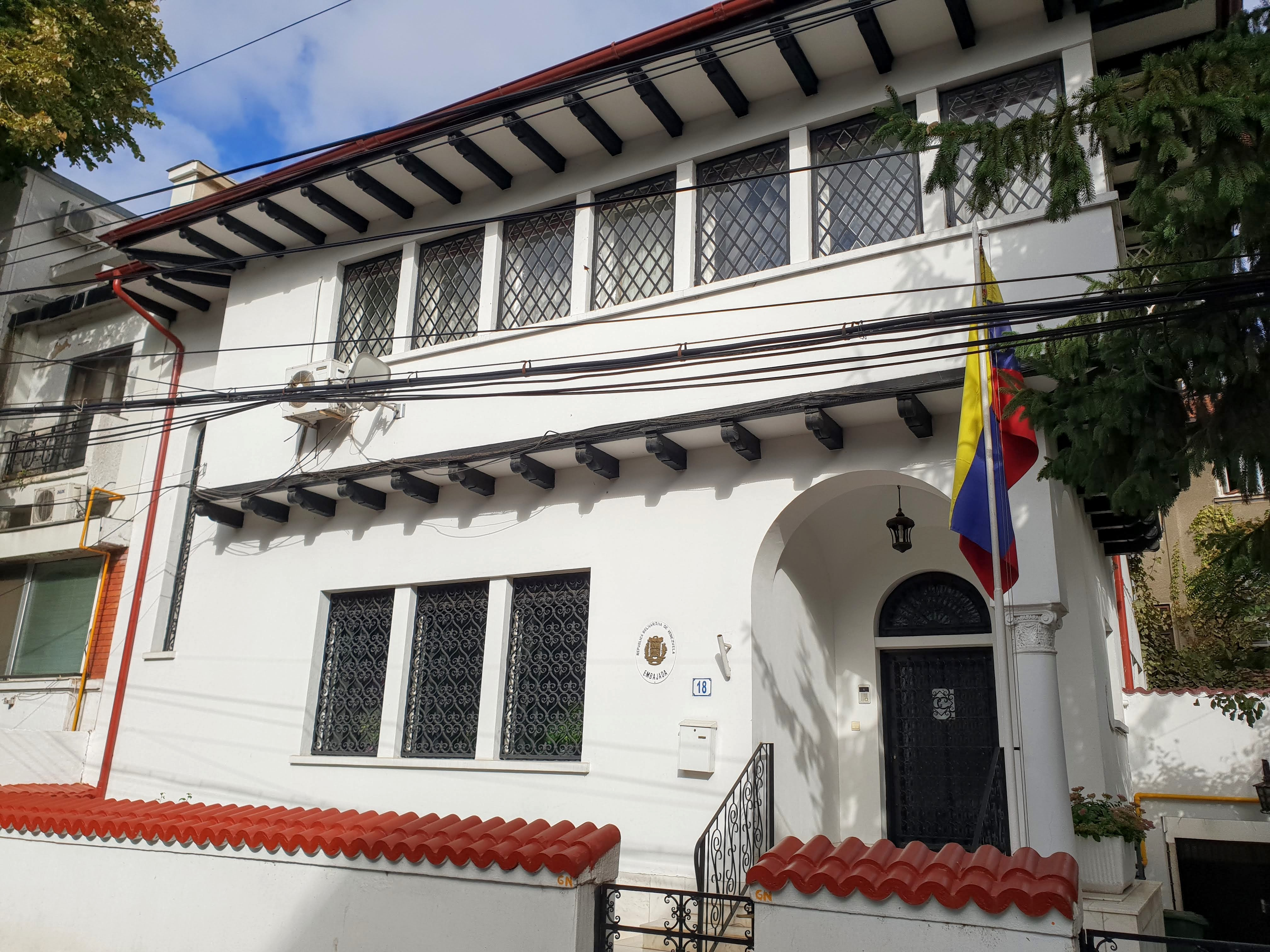
Embassy of Venezuela

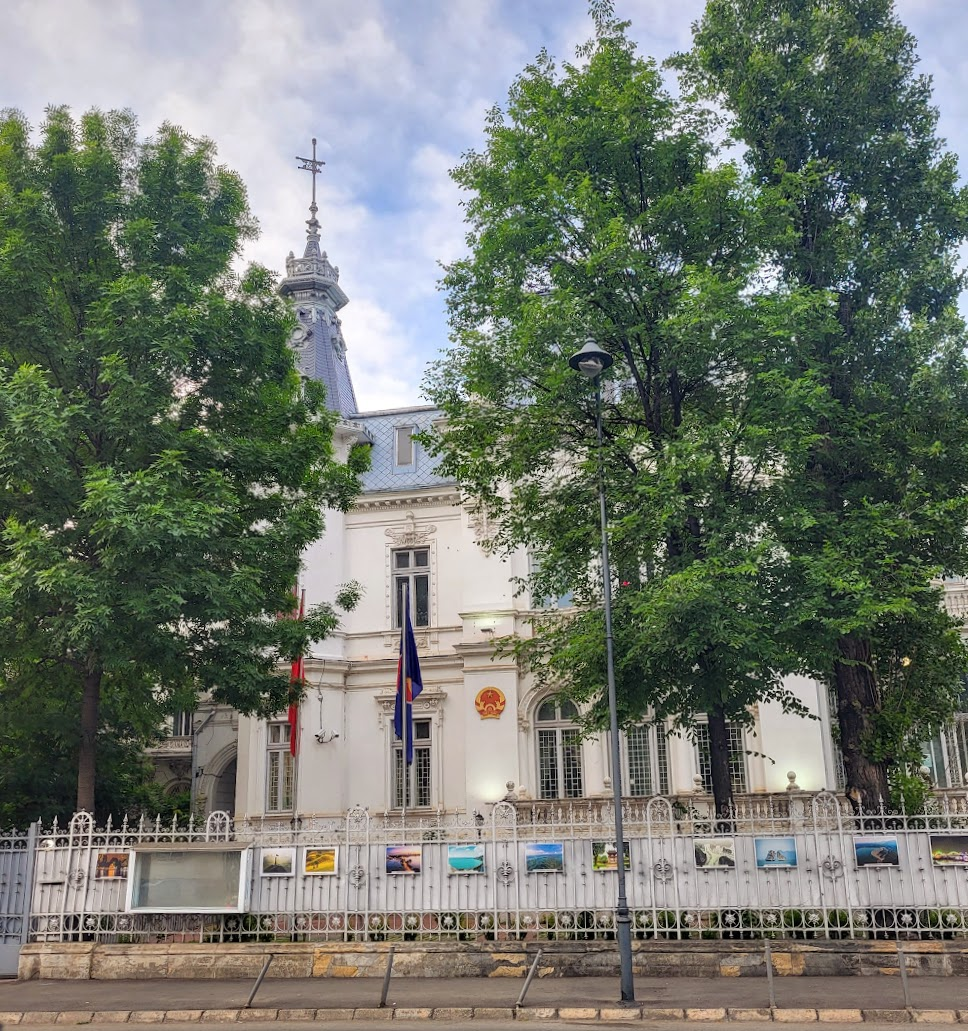
Embassy of Vietnam

== Consular missions ==
=== Cluj-Napoca ===
1. Hungary (Consulate-General)

=== Constanța ===
1. Turkey (Consulate-General)

=== Iași ===
1. Moldova (Consulate-General)

=== Miercurea Ciuc ===
1. Hungary (Consulate-General)

=== Sibiu ===
1. Germany (Consulate)

=== Timișoara ===
1. Germany (Consulate)
2. Serbia (Consulate-General)

== Non-resident embassies accredited to Romania ==
=== Resident in Ankara, Turkey ===
1. Burundi
2. Guinea
3. Kenya

=== Resident in Berlin, Germany ===
1. Bolivia
2. Chad
3. Bahrain
4. Congo-Brazzaville
5. Dominican Republic
6. Honduras
7. Jamaica
8. Laos
9. Malawi
10. Mauritania
11. Nepal
12. Niger
13. Rwanda
14. South Africa
15. Tanzania
16. Togo
17. Uganda
18. Zimbabwe

=== Resident in Brussels, Belgium ===
1. Cape Verde
2. Costa Rica
3. New Zealand
4. Seychelles
5. Somalia

=== Resident in London, United Kingdom ===
1. Botswana
2. Eswatini
3. Guyana

=== Resident in Moscow, Russia ===
1. Eritrea
2. Gabon
3. Mauritius
4. Sierra Leone

=== Resident in Paris, France ===
1. Benin
2. Gambia
3. Zambia

=== Resident in Rome, Italy ===
1. Burkina Faso
2. Lesotho
3. Mali
4. Monaco
5. Myanmar
6. Uzbekistan

=== Resident in Vienna, Austria ===
1. El Salvador
2. Guatemala
3. Ivory Coast
4. Namibia
5. Panama
6. Paraguay
7. Tajikistan

=== Resident in Warsaw, Poland ===
1. Afghanistan
2. Iceland
3. Latvia
4. Senegal

=== Resident elsewhere ===
1. Andorra (Paris)
2. Angola (Belgrade)
3. Australia (Athens)
4. Cambodia (Sofia)
5. Ecuador (Budapest)
6. Ethiopia (Geneva)
7. Ghana (Prague)
8. Kyrgyzstan (Kyiv)
9. Luxembourg (Athens)
10. Malta (Valletta)
11. Mongolia (Sofia)

=== Unconfirmed ===
1. Central African Republic (Moscow)
2. Dominica (Brussels)
3. Haiti (Rome)
4. Maldives (Berlin/Geneva)
5. Singapore (Ankara)
6. Vanuatu (Canberra)

== Closed missions ==
Host city	Sending country	Mission	Year closed	Ref.
Bucharest	Central African Republic	Embassy (Note: Resident in Moscow, Russia)	Unknown	
Bucharest	Costa Rica	Embassy (Note: Resident in Brussels, Belgium)	1999	
Bucharest	Ecuador	Embassy (Note: Resident in Budapest, Hungary)	1999	
Bucharest	Guinea	Embassy (Note: Resident in Ankara, Turkey)	1988	
Bucharest	Mauritania	Embassy (Note: Resident in Berlin, Germany)	1996	
Bucharest	Mongolia	Embassy (Note: Resident in Sofia, Bulgaria)	1997	
Bucharest	Somalia	Embassy	1991	
Bucharest	South Africa	Embassy	2021	
Bucharest	Yemen	Embassy	2006	
Cluj-Napoca	Germany	Consulate	2014	
Constanța	China	Consulate-General	2017	
Constanța	Russia	Consulate-General	2026	
Suceava	Ukraine	Consulate-General	2014	
Timișoara	Hungary	Consulate-General	2014	

== See also ==
- List of diplomatic missions of Romania
- Foreign relations of Romania
- Visa requirements for Romanian citizens
