= National Intelligence Academy =

Organization in Bucharest, Romania

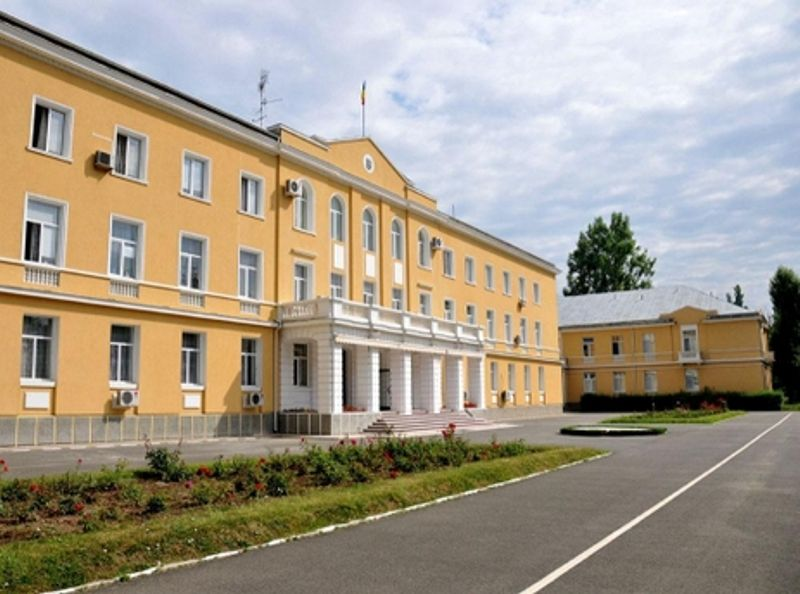
Animv

The National Intelligence Academy (Romanian: Academia Națională de Informații) is a Romanian university run by the Romanian Intelligence Service intended to train intelligence officers. In its 20 years of existence, it had trained over 4000 intelligence officers.

For the class starting in 2014, the admission was based on an exam and it had 30 places for undergraduate studies (3 years), as well as 35 places for Master's degree. In order to become an intelligence officer, a student must complete at least a master's degree.

The university's origin can be found in the Psychosociology Faculty of the Alexandru Ioan Cuza Police Academy, which was created by a governmental order in 1991. The following year, a separate institution was created for training intelligence officers, the "High Institute of Intelligence" (Institutul Superior de Informații). In 1996, it was reorganized as the "National Institute of Intelligence" (Institutul Național de Informații) and in 2000, it came to have the current form.

The fact that many government ministers and magistrates were alumni of this university, was noticed by journalists. Sidonia Bogdan noted in România Liberă that in no other European country so many magistrates were pursuing PhD under the guidance of top politicians such as Gabriel Oprea and that the Superior Council of Magistracy should explain why this is happening.

== Faculty ==
- Gabriel Oprea (vice-prime-minister)
- Mihai Tudose (Minister of Economy)

== Alumni ==
- George Scutaru (Member of the Chamber of Deputies);
- Csaba Ferenc Asztalos (president of the National Council for Combating Discrimination);
- Ramona Mănescu (Member of European Parliament);
- Horia Georgescu (president of the National Agency of Integrity);
- Marius Nica (Minister of European Funds)
- Sorin Mihai Grindeanu (Minister of Information Society);
- Sorin Mihai Câmpeanu (Minister of Education);
- Angel Tîlvăr (Minister of the Diaspora);
- Neculai Onțanu (Mayor of Bucharest's Sector 2);
- Florian Coldea.
