= Pârâul Radului =

Pârâul Radului may refer to:

- Pârâul Radului, a tributary of the Capra in Neamț County, Romania
- Pârâul Radului, a tributary of the Oanțu in Neamț County, Romania
