= Neculai Onțanu =

Romanian politician

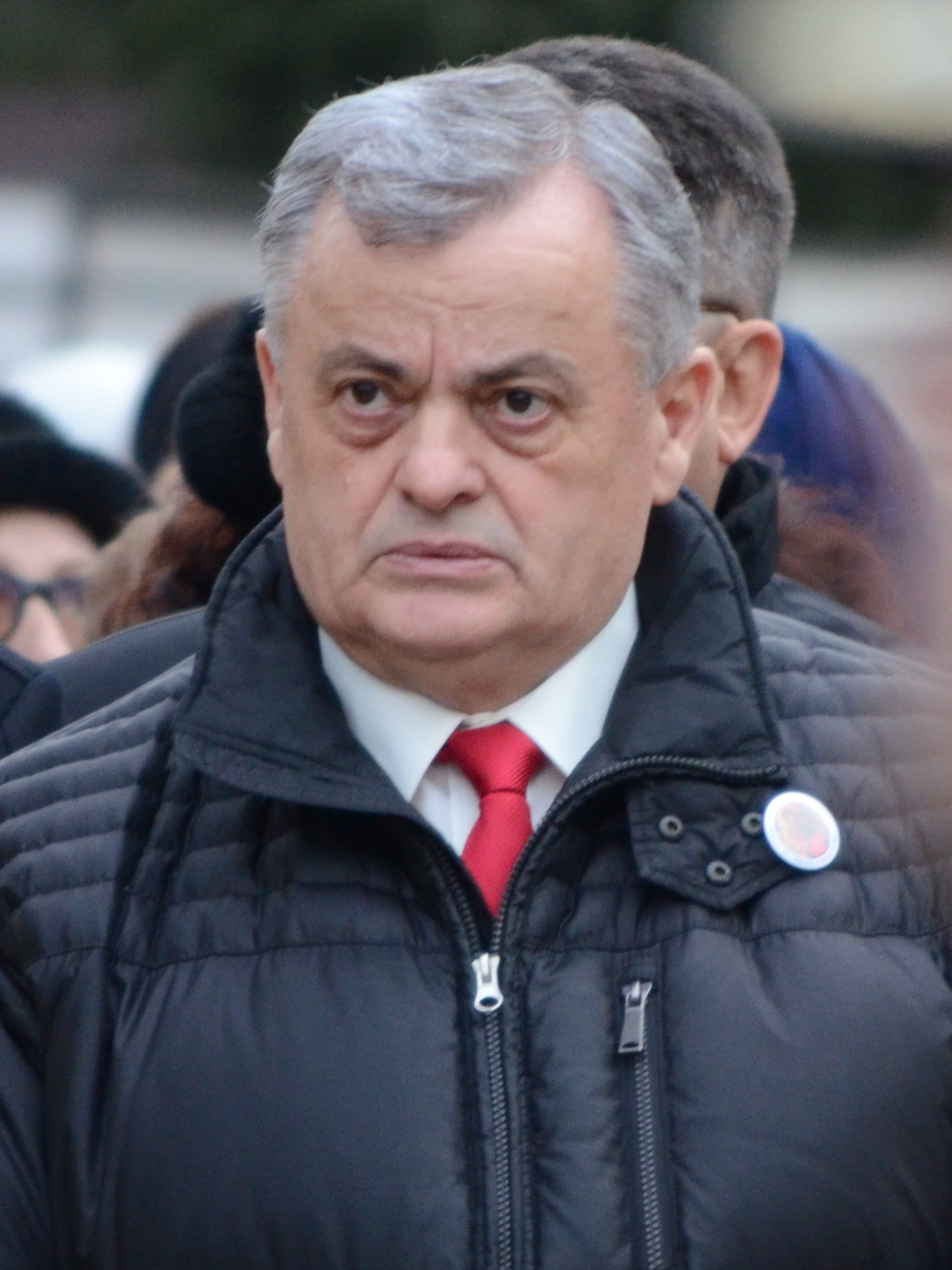

Mayor of Bucharest's Sector 2
- In office 18 June 2000 – 23 March 2016
- Preceded by: Vladimir Popescu
- Succeeded by: Mihai Toader

Personal details
- Born: September 13, 1949 (age 76) Pângărați, Neamț County, Romania
- Party: Romanian Communist Party (?–1989); Socialist Party of Labour (?–1999); Social Democracy Party of Romania (1999–2001); Social Democratic Party (2001–2009); National Union for the Progress of Romania (2010–2016)
- Children: 2

Military service
- Rank: Major general

Neculai Onțanu (born September 13, 1949) is a Romanian politician who has served as mayor of Bucharest's Sector 2.

== Biography ==
Born in Pângărați, Neamț County, Onțanu worked as construction worker between 1968 and 1995, becoming a construction foreman on apartment buildings construction sites. In 1986, he was admitted as part-time learner in the Ștefan Gheorghiu Academy, the university which trained cadres of the Communist Party of Romania.

After the Romanian Revolution, Onțanu joined the Socialist Party of Labour, becoming its vicepresident, as well as the president of the Bucharest organization. Between 1995 and 1996, he was a parliamentary expert at the Chamber of Deputies, while between 1996 and 2000, he was a member of the General Council of Bucharest. He resigned from the party in May 1999 and joined the Party of Social Democracy in Romania.

Onțanu was the Party of Social Democracy in Romania's candidate during the 2000 local elections, which he won in the second round against Dragos Frumosu the candidate of the Democratic Convention of Romania. He was re-elected in 2004 and 2008, being the candidate of the same Social-Democratic Party.

In March 2007, Onțanu, who had not been active in the army beyond the mandatory military service, was promoted from being a first-class private to become a reserve colonel by an order of Minister of Defense Sorin Frunzăverde. In December 2008, he was promoted by President Băsescu to become a one-star brigadier general.

According to the CV published on the City Hall site, Onțanu gained in 2007 a PhD from the Leibniz University USA, an obscure unaccredited institution of higher education from the United States.

In 2009, Onțanu defended his PhD thesis titled "The Management of Protecting Critical Infrastructure" at the National Intelligence Academy under the supervision of Gabriel Oprea, a personal friend and leader of UNPR. In 2015, a Hotnews investigation found that dozens of pages of his thesis were identical to pages from other books and journals.

On October 21, 2009, he was excluded from the Social-Democratic Party for publicly supporting Traian Băsescu for President of Romania. The following day, President Băsescu increased the military rank of Onțanu, who thus became a two-star major general.

Onțanu joined the National Union for the Progress of Romania (UNPR) and in 2010 he was chosen to be the party's candidate for the Mayor of Bucharest elections, but later the party decided to support Sorin Oprescu. Also in 2010, in the internal elections of UNPR, Onțanu was elected President of the Bucharest organization.

On 23 March 2016 Neculai Onţanu was detained by prosecutors for 24 hours, being accused of having received bribes for restitution of 80,000 square meters of land. He was convicted of bribery and, in 2021, received a three-year suspended sentence from the High Court of Cassation and Justice.

== Elections results ==
Year	Party	First round	Second round	Result
2000	Party of Social Democracy in Romania	39,856	72,544 (54%)	won against Vladimir Popescu
2004	Social Democratic Party	47.48%		won against Anca Boagiu
2008	Social Democratic Party	57.31%	–	won from the first round
2012	National Union for the Progress of Romania		66,184 (62%)	won against Dragoș Frumosu
