= Philippines–Romania relations =

Diplomatic ties between the Philippines and Romania

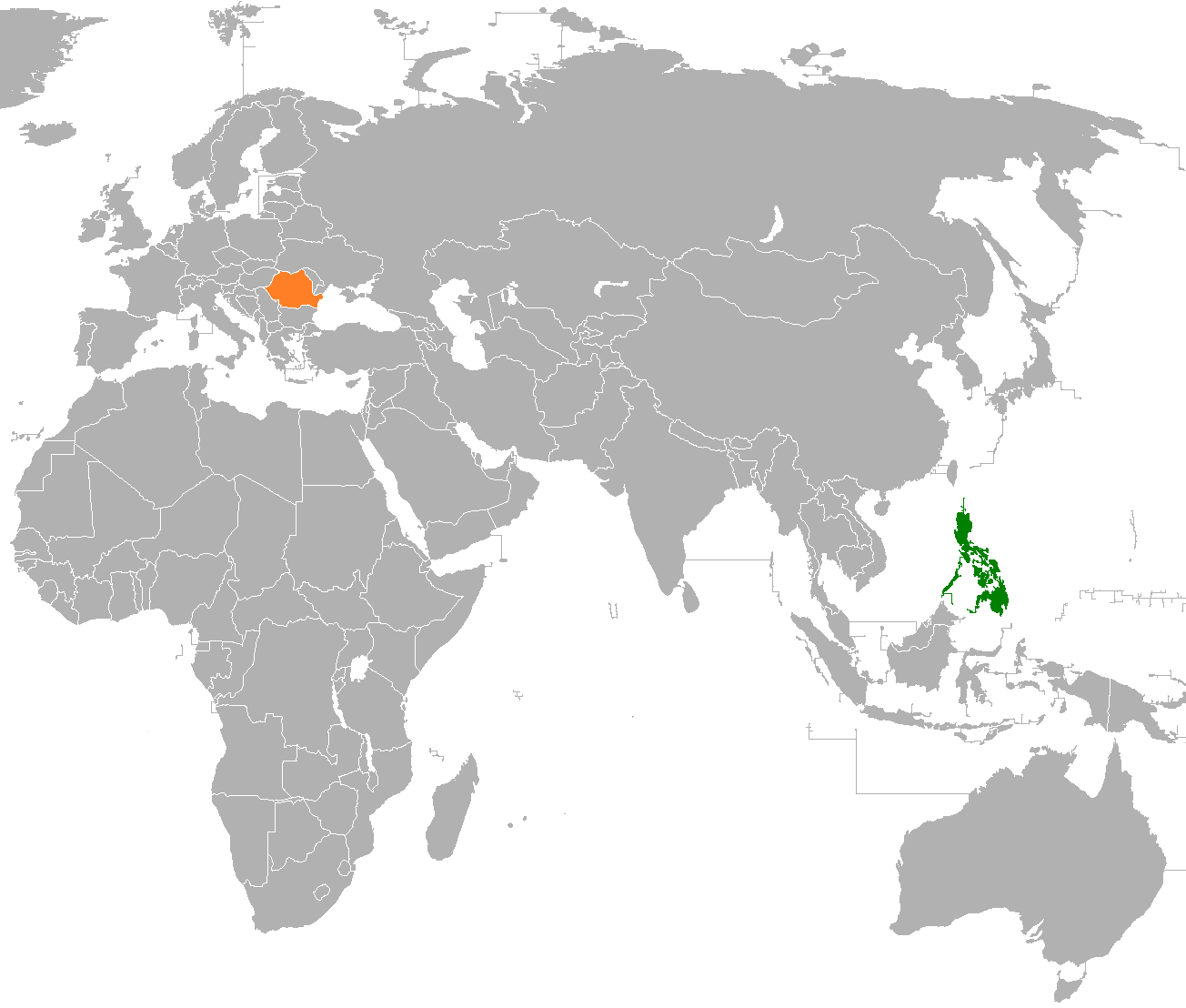

- Philippines: Romania

Philippines–Romania relations are the bilateral relations between the Philippines and Romania.

The Philippines maintains an embassy in Bucharest, which was reopened in 2024 after being closed in 2012. Romania has an embassy in Manila, which is headed by a Chargé d'Affaires.

== History ==
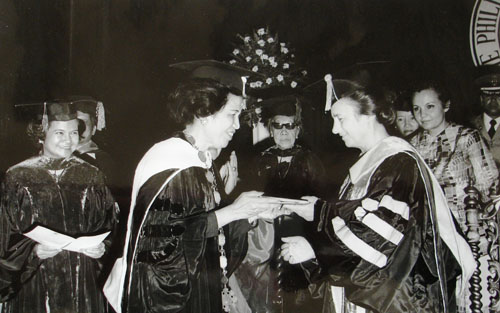
Elena Ceaușescu given a citation from the Philippine Women's University

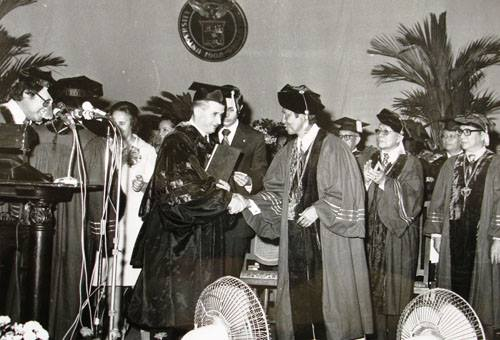
Necolae Ceaușescu given a citation as "Doctor of Laws", Honoris Causa by the Board of Regents of the University of the Philippines

Philippine-Romanian relations started when Nicolae Ceaușescu visited Manila as the first socialist leader to enter the Philippines on April 12, 1975, followed by creating a committee for joint Philippine-Romanian Scientific and Technological Commission headed by Dr. Melecio S. Magno and then Ambassador to Romania Leticia Ramos-Shahani. During that time, the Philippines opened relationships with the socialist countries as part of mutual coexistence policy during the Martial Law regime of Ferdinand Marcos, breaking the anti-communist atmosphere prevailing before the administration.

It was also from Ceaușescu's visit wherein the first couple were given citations from the University of the Philippines and the Philippine Women's University. Ceaușescu was given an honorary degree as "Doctor of Laws" by the board of regents, while his wife, Elena, as "Doctor of Science, Honoris Causa".

In 1994, The Philippine–Romania Business Council, Inc. (PRBC) was organized as an offshoot of the first Philippine trade mission to Romania by the former Undersecretary Tomas Alcantara of the Department of Trade and Industry (DTI). In 2002 Romania and the Philippines supported each other's bid for a non-permanent seat in the United Nations Security Council. In 2003, the Philippines and Romania agreed to explore areas for cooperation in trade complementation.

== Official visits ==
In January 1994, the President of the Chamber of Deputies of Romania visited the Philippines. In June 1996, the President pro tempore of the Senate of the Philippines visited Romania. In September 1997, the Minister of Foreign Affairs of the Philippines visited Romania during the Conference on New and Restored Democracies. In February 2002, President of Romania Ion Iliescu went on a state visit to the Philippines. In July 2002, festivities meant to celebrate three decades of diplomatic relations between the two countries took place in the capitals of both countries.

== Bilateral Agreements ==
1. Trade Agreement (1992)
2. Agreement on the promotion and protection of investment
3. Memorandum of cooperation in tourism (1997)
4. Technical and scientific cooperation agreement

== See also ==
- Foreign relations of the Philippines
- Foreign relations of Romania
