= Pângărați =

- Commune
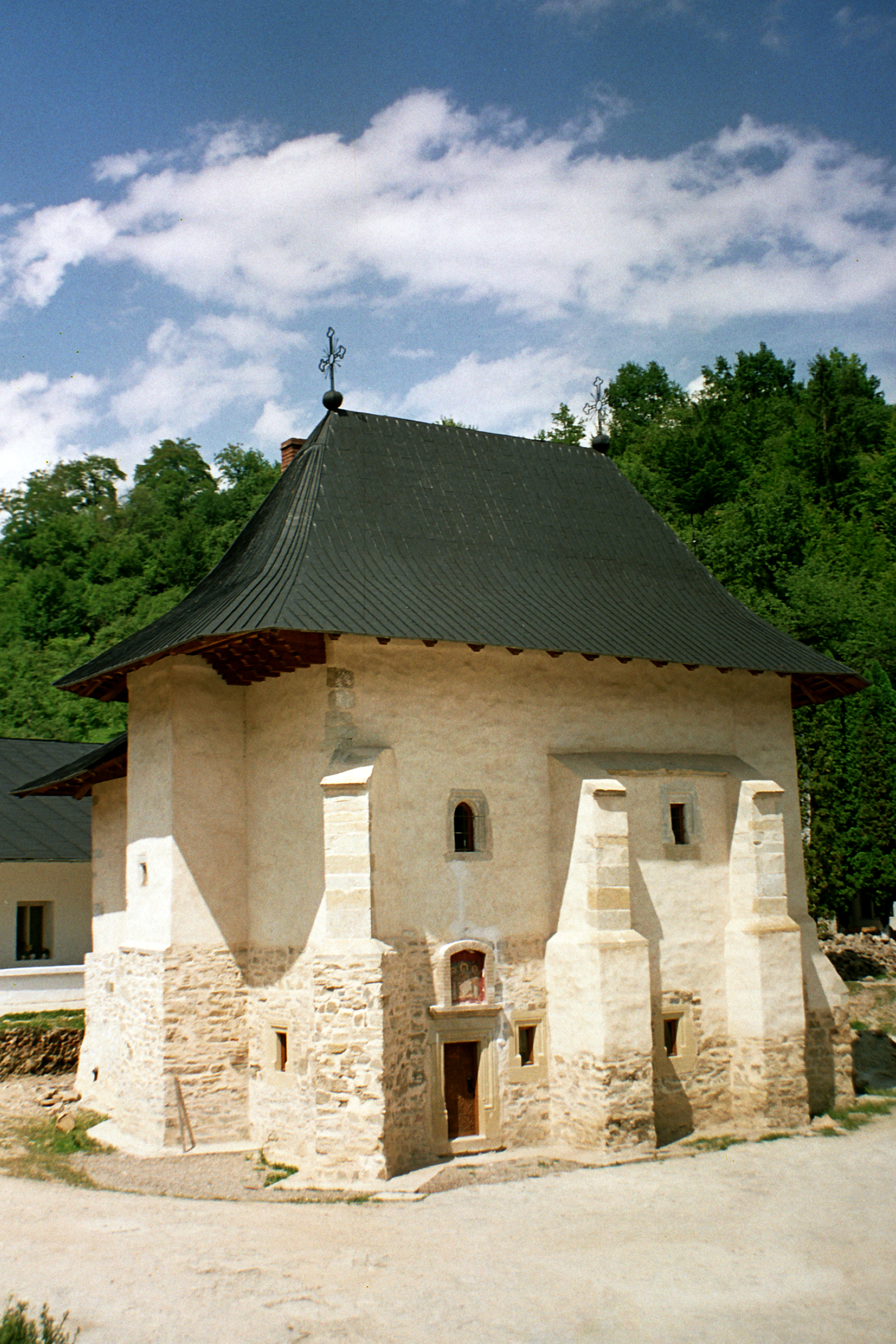
- Old church of Pângărați Monastery

- Location in Neamț County

- Location in Romania
- Coordinates: 46°56′N 26°9′E
- Country: Romania
- County: Neamț

Government
  - Mayor (2020–2024): Ioan Petronel Mancaș (PNL)
- Area: 121.86 km^{2} (47.05 sq mi)
- Elevation: 383 m (1,257 ft)
- Highest elevation: 700 m (2,300 ft)
- Population (2021-12-01): 4,396
  - Density: 36.07/km^{2} (93.43/sq mi)
- Time zone: UTC+02:00 (EET)
  - Summer (DST): UTC+03:00 (EEST)
- Postal code: 617305
- Area code: +(40) 233
- Vehicle reg.: NT
- Website: pangarati.ro

Pângărați is a commune in Neamț County, Western Moldavia, Romania. It is composed of six villages: Oanțu, Pângărați, Pângărăcior, Poiana, Preluca, and Stejaru.

The commune is located in the central-western part of the county, in an area delimited by the southern slopes of the Stânișoara Mountains and the northern slopes of the Tarcău Mountains. The mountains are separated by the river Bistrița, to which converge on the left the tributaries Stejaru, Pângărați, and Pângărăcior and on the right the river Oanțu.

Along the Bistrița valley there are two anthropic lakes: the Pângărați Reservoir and, partially, the Vaduri Reservoir. In Stejaru village there is the Dimitrie Leonida hydroelectric power plant, which is fed from Lake Izvorul Muntelui by a tunnel dug through Botoșanu Mountain. The Pângărați forest reserve is located north of Poiana village, at an altitude of 700 m (2,300 ft); the yew that grow there are protected.

The commune is crossed by the national road DN15, which connects it to the town of Bicaz, 13 km (8.1 mi) to the west, and to the county seat, Piatra Neamț, 17 km (11 mi) to the east. The Bacău–Bicaz CFR railway also passes through the commune, which is served by the Pângărați station and the Stejaru passenger stop.

The Pângărați Monastery, which currently houses 36 monks, was built in 1560 by ktitor Alexandru Lăpușneanu, ruler of Moldavia.

Historical population
Year	Pop.	±%
1992	5,106	—
2002	5,199	+1.8%
2011	4,672	−10.1%
2021	4,396	−5.9%
Source: Census data

== Natives ==
- Neculai Onțanu (born 1949), politician
- Nicu Stroia (born 1971), gymnast
