= George Scutaru =

Romanian politician

Member of the Chamber of Deputies
- Incumbent
- Assumed office 2004

Personal details
- Born: October 24, 1973 (age 52) Focşani, Romania

George Adrian Scutaru (born 24 October 1973) is a Romanian politician and member, from Buzău County, of the Chamber of Deputies of Romania

== Biography and education ==
George Scutaru was born on 24 October 1973 in the town of Focşani, Vrancea County. He graduated the History Faculty in the University of Bucharest and holds a master's degree in International Relations. He also graduated the National Defence College and the National Intelligence Academy, as well as attended training courses and programmes at the NATO College of Rome, the G.C. Marshall European Center for Security Studies and the US State Department.

He is the honorary president of the League of Professional Military and a founding member of Unmanned Vehicle Systems Romania Association.

He is married and has two daughters.

== Professional career ==
He started his professional career in journalism, contributing articles to newspapers and magazines. He worked as an editor at the domestic policy section of a press agency, then as a press correspondent to Moscow, before becoming the director general of a press consultancy and monitoring agency.

== Political career ==
Following the 2004 elections he got a seat in the House of Deputies, being elected on the lists of the National Liberal Party, and is currently serving his third mandate as an MP.

Since 2004 he has been a member of the Committee on Defence, Public Order and National Security, in which he successively held the positions of Secretary (2004–2008) and vice-chairman (2008–2012; 2012–2016). His interest in both security and international affairs is testified by his belonging to three Parliamentary Friendship Groups – Romania-Georgia, Romania-the Russian Federation and Romania-Hellenic Republic – as well as to the Romanian parliamentary Delegation to NATO PA. Moreover, he is a founding member of the „ProAmerica” Group in the Parliament of Romania, well known as a staunch supporter of strengthening the bilateral relations between Romania and the US and as a promoter of the deployment of the ballistic missile shield on the Romanian territory.
