= Nicu Stroia =

Romanian gymnast

- Full name: Nicu Florin Stroia
- Born: 20 October 1971 (age 54) Pângărați, Socialist Republic of Romania

Gymnastics career
- Discipline: Men's artistic gymnastics
- Country represented: Romania

Nicu Florin Stroia (born 20 October 1971) is a Romanian gymnast. He competed at the 1992 Summer Olympics and the 1996 Summer Olympics.
