= Floreasca =

District in Romania

Coordinates: 44°27′59″N 26°06′08″E

Floreasca on the map of Bucharest

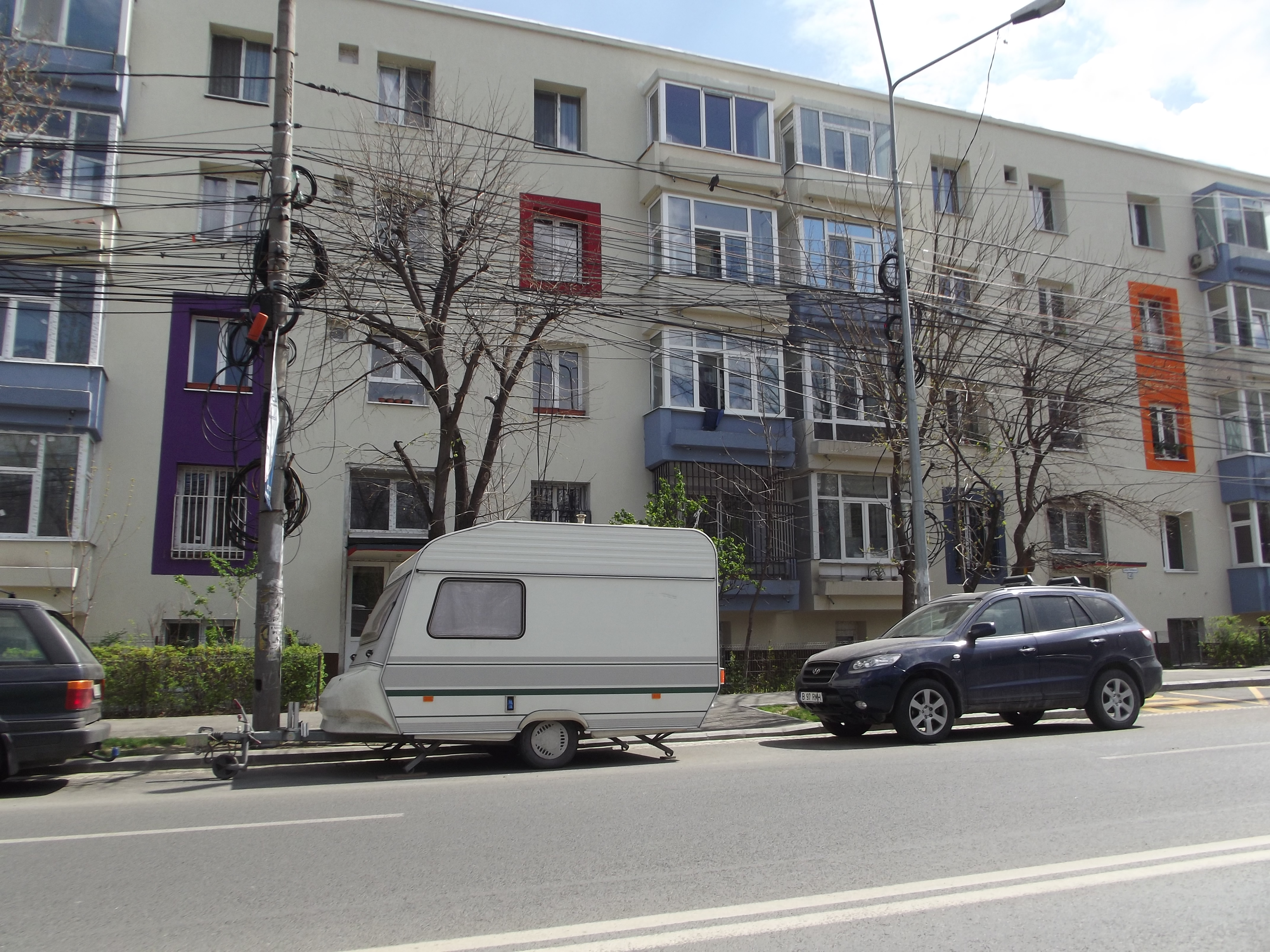
Flats in Floreasca

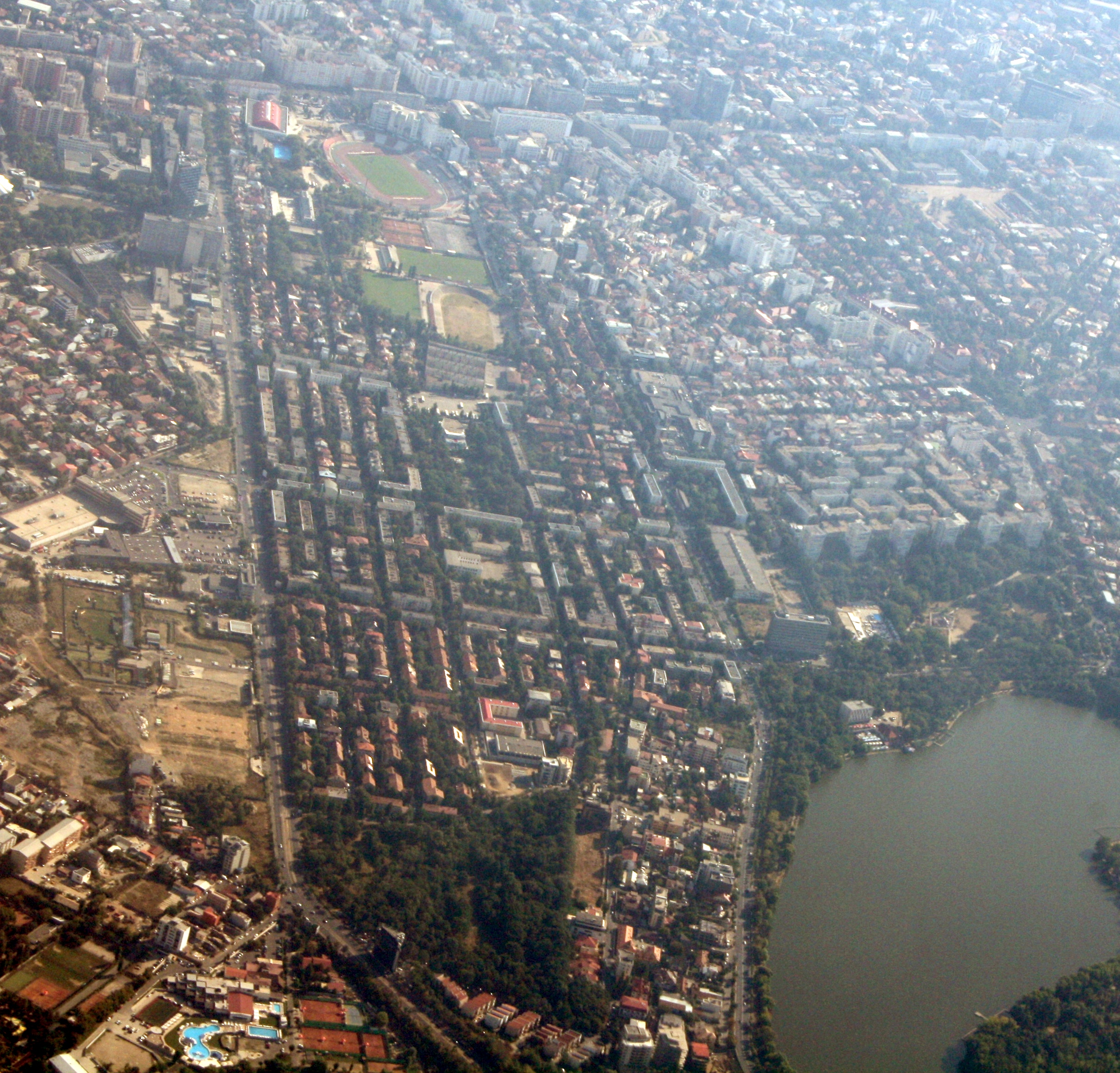
Floreasca, aerial view

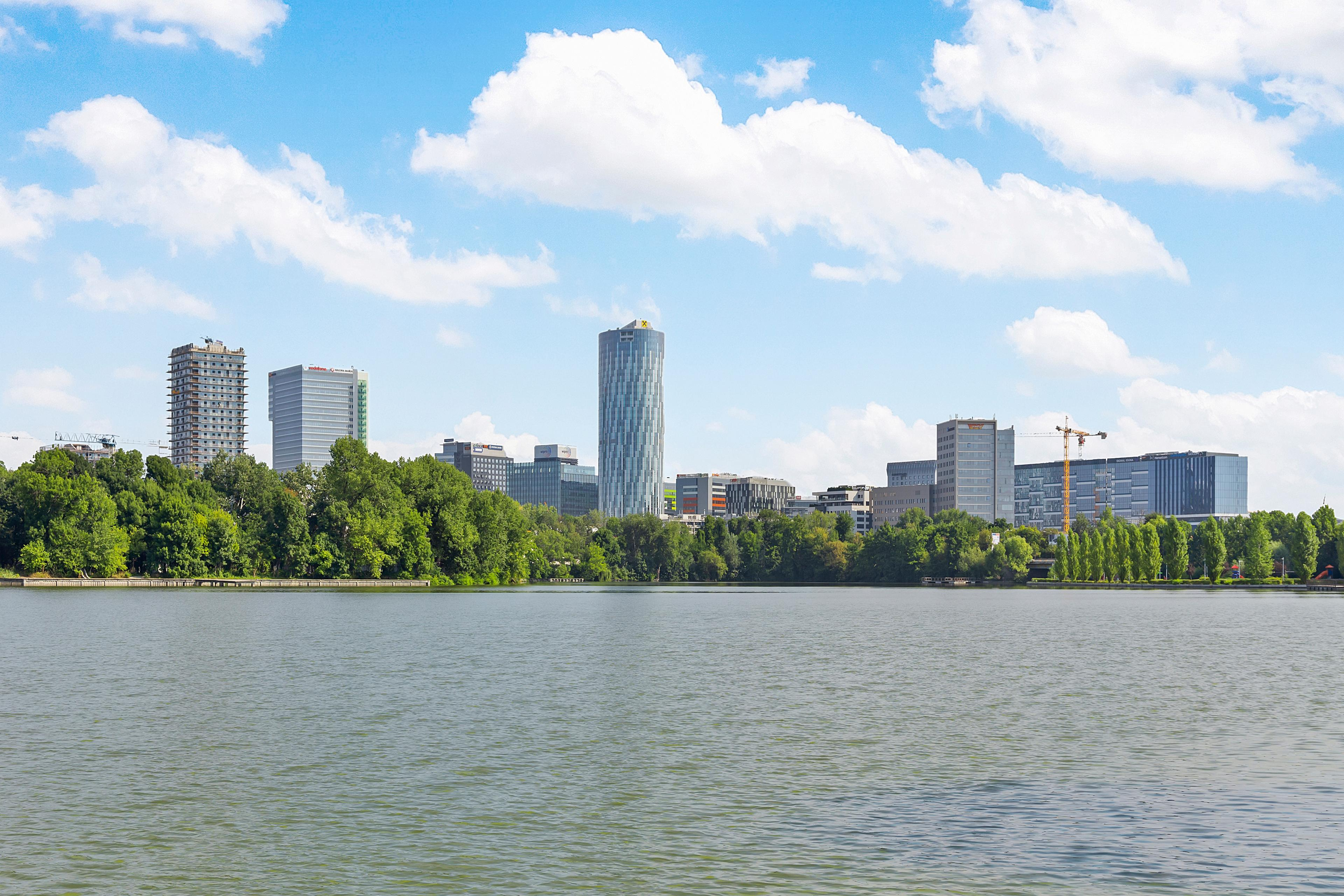
Floreasca business district, as seen from Lake Herăstrău

Floreasca (Romanian pronunciation: [floˈre̯aska]) is a district in Bucharest, Romania, in Sector 2. Its name comes from Lake Floreasca, which is situated in the north of the neighborhood. The Floreasca Hospital is also situated in the neighborhood, in its southern part. Floreasca is considered an upper class area.

The neighborhood was built on a former landfill site. It is mainly composed of small apartment blocks of 3-4 floors, and has many green areas. Its population density is lower than other parts of Bucharest. In 2008, work at the Floreasca City Center started in the area, which was completed in 2013. In recent years, the desire of developers to increasingly build in the neighborhood has led to conflicts with the residents.

== Office buildings ==
Here is a list of the tallest office buildings:

- Floreasca City Center - Sky Tower, the tallest building in Bucharest and Romania.
- Nusco Tower, one of the tallest buildings in Bucharest
- Global Worth Tower
