= Oanțu =

- Location within Romania

Location
- Country: Romania
- Counties: Neamț
- Villages: Oanțu

Physical characteristics
- Source: Tarcău Mountains
- Mouth: Bistrița
  - location: Pângărați Reservoir
  - coordinates: 46°55′04″N 26°11′38″E
- Length: 14 km (8.7 mi)
- Basin size: 40 km^{2} (15 sq mi)

Basin features
- Progression: Bistrița→ Siret→ Danube→ Black Sea
- Tributaries
  - left: Pârâul Radului

The Oanțu is a right tributary of the river Bistrița in Romania. It discharges into the Pângărați Reservoir near the village Oanțu. Its length is 14 km (8.7 mi) and its basin size is 40 km^{2} (15 sq mi).
