= Floreasca City Center =

Skyscraper in Bucharest

- Floreasca SkyTower, July 2015

General information
- Status: Completed
- Type: Office, conference, restaurant, retail
- Location: Barbu Văcărescu Street, Bucharest, Romania
- Coordinates: 44°28′42″N 26°6′14″E
- Construction started: 2008
- Completed: 2013
- Opening: April 2011 (FCC Office); October 10, 2012 (SkyTower, Office Wing); October 2013 (Promenada mall)
- Cost: US$ 250,000,000
- Owner: Raiffeisen Property Holding International

Height
- Roof: 137 m (449 ft)

Technical details
- Floor count: 37 (5 basement floors)
- Floor area: 214,000 m^{2} (2,300,000 sq ft)
- Lifts/elevators: 10

Design and construction
- Main contractor: Octagon Contracting & Engineering S.A.

Website
- www.skytower.ro

Floreasca City Center is a multi-functional center with a shopping and entertainment complex as well as two office buildings in Bucharest. Floreasca City Center consists of a center for shopping, entertainment and business. The gross area amounts to approx. 214,000 m^{2} (2,300,000 sq ft) with rentable area of approximately 120,000 m^{2} (1,300,000 sq ft) and more than 2,000 parking places. It is the tallest skyscraper in Romania, with shopping-mall, entertainment, retail and offices. Located in Floreasca, an urban district and residential area in the northeast of Bucharest, SkyTower is close to another Raiffeisen evolution project, the Oracle Tower.

== Construction works ==
Funding obtained from Raiffeisen Bank International was about €95.5-million. The project was constructed in stages.

=== Stage I : SkyTower ===
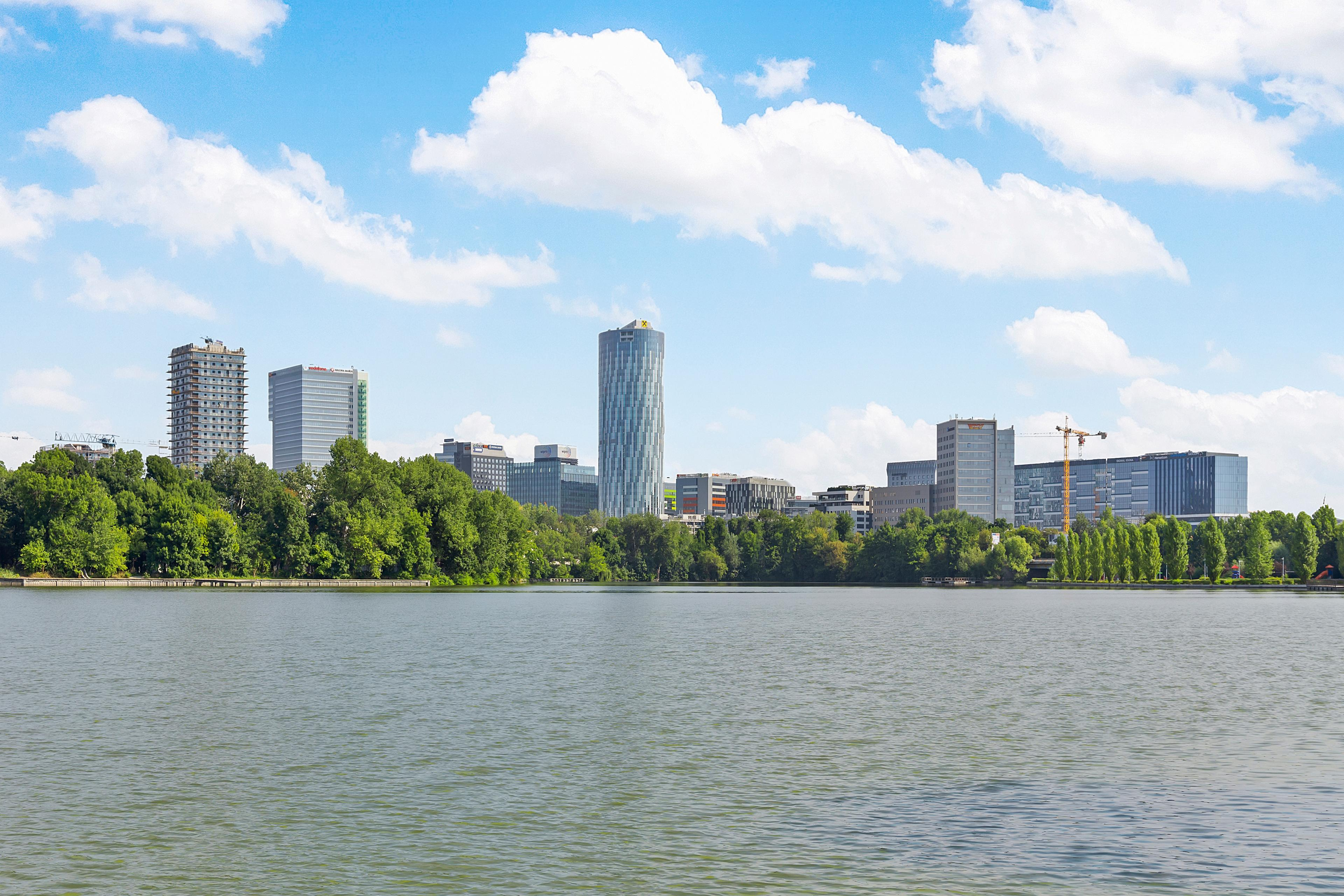
Floreasca business district, as seen from Lake Herăstrău.

Located between two of Bucharest's arterial roads, Calea Floreasca and Barbu Văcărescu street, SkyTower is the second office building is designed as a high-rise building with a height of 137 m (449 ft). With 37 upper floors and 5 basement floors (gross floor area approximately 78,000 m^{2} (840,000 sq ft), this tower is the highest building in Bucharest and Romania. A restaurant and conference rooms are situated in the two uppermost floors. The facade of the Tower has an oblong structure over 4 floors with transparent, translucent and opaque areas. In the uppermost floors the facade opens up and becomes entirely transparent.

The ground floor features a generous entrance lobby, hosting reception and security desk and provides access to the upper floors via the security filter accessible by electronic card. The vertical access is ensured by ten elevators, out of which five are low-rise (up to the 18th floor) and five are high-rise (up to the 36th floor).

Each regular office floor is designed to host open space offices with afferent toilets and connections ready for installing the kitchenettes, accommodating up to 60 working stations, benefiting from a specially designed meeting area.

On June 6, 2012, SkyTower has reached the 36th floor and became the tallest building in Romania. The topping out ceremony was held on June 28, 2012.

=== Stage II : Office Wing ===
The Office Wing, an office building with 7 floors and a polygonal ground plan (gross floor area approximately 26,000 m^{2} (280,000 sq ft)) floats above the shopping mall. This structure features a transparent light glass façade. In the floor connecting the structure with the mall, there is a fitness centre which has a direct exit to the generous open space on the roof of the shopping mall.

=== Stage III : Promenada mall ===
The shopping and entertainment center has a gross floor area of approximately 110,000 m^{2} (1,200,000 sq ft) and is divided into 3 basement floors with some 1,300 parking spaces and 3 upper floors with sales areas (ground floor and 1st upper floor) as well as a food court and a cinema center in the 2nd upper floor.

The mall received from the Austrian Society for Sustainable Buildings the "Gold" certificate issued according to OGNI/DGNB standards. Completion of Promenada shopping center, which will house about 120 shops, was finished in the late 2013. More than 50% of the space has been leased to internationally renowned retailers.

== See also ==
- List of tallest buildings in Romania
