= Oracle Tower Bucharest =

Office building in Bucharest, Romania

Floreasca Tower
- Oracle Tower

General information
- Status: Completed
- Location: Bucharest, Romania
- Construction started: 2003
- Opening: 2005

Height
- Roof: 45 m (148 ft)

Technical details
- Floor count: 14
- Floor area: 10,000 m^{2} (110,000 sq ft)

Oracle Tower or Floreasca Tower, is an office building located in the city of Bucharest, Romania. It has 16 floors: 2 basements, a ground floor and 13 floors of offices, with a total surface of 10,000 m^{2}. Construction started in 2003 and was completed in 2005.

Oracle currently operates space in the Oracle Tower of Bucharest.
