= Sector 2 (Bucharest) =

Bucharest, Sector 2 Sector 2, București
- Sector
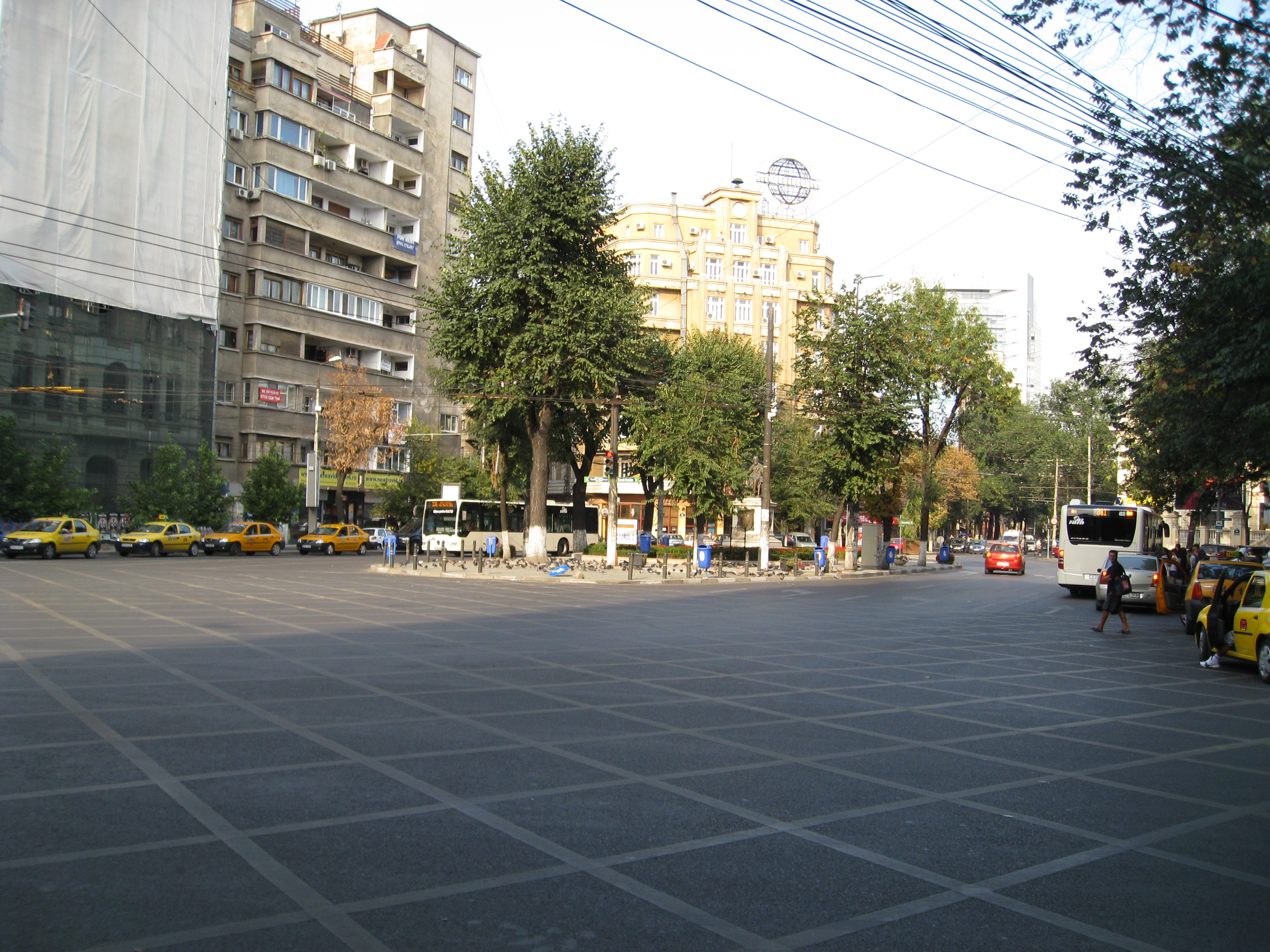
- Rosetti Square
- Interactive map of Bucharest, Sector 2
- Coordinates: 44°26′7″N 26°6′10″E
- Country: Romania
- County: Municipality of Bucharest

Government
  - Mayor: Rareș Hopincă

Area
  - Total: 32 km^{2} (12 sq mi)
- Elevation: 60–90 m (200–300 ft)

Population (December 1, 2021)
  - Total: 290,507
  - Density: 9,078.3/km^{2} (23,513/sq mi)
- Time zone: UTC+2 (EET)
  - Summer (DST): UTC+3 (EEST)
- Postal Code: 02xxxx
- Area code: +40 x1
- Car Plates: B
- Website: www.ps2.ro

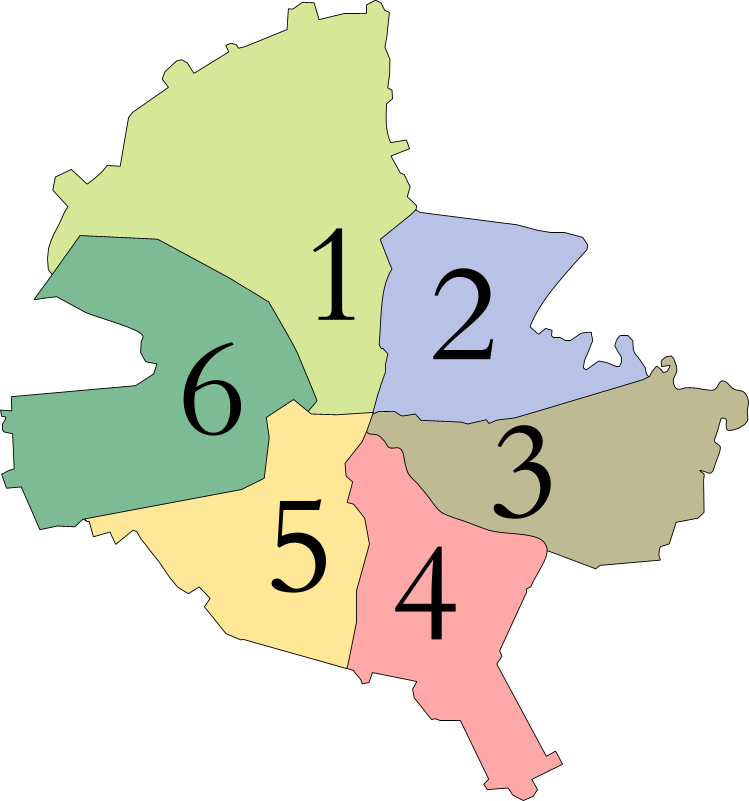
The six sectors of Bucharest

Sector 2 (Romanian: Sectorul 2) is an administrative unit of Bucharest.

== Demographics ==
Sector 2 is the city's most multicultural sector. In particular, it contains Romania's largest community of Chinese people, who mainly live in the districts of Colentina and Obor.

== Economy ==
Air Bucharest has its head office in Sector 2.

== Boroughs ==
- Colentina
- Floreasca
- Iancului
- Moșilor
- Obor
- Pantelimon
- Ștefan cel Mare
- Tei
- Vatra Luminoasă

== Politics ==
The mayor of Bucharest's Sector 2 is Radu Mihaiu, a member of the USR PLUS Alliance who was elected in 2020 for a four-year term. The Local Council of Sector 2 has 27 seats, with the following party composition (as of 2020):

Party	Seats	Current Council
Social Democratic Party (PSD)	10	
Save Romania Union (USR)	9	
National Liberal Party (PNL)	6	
People's Movement Party (PMP)	2	
