= Trampette =

Small square trampoline used in gymnastics

A trampette is a small square trampoline used in gymnastics. In TeamGym, the trampette is positioned at the end of a runway in front of a mat. The trampette is adjusted at an angle, tilted towards the gymnast, who approaches the trampette at a run. The gymnast jumps onto the trampette and performs a somersault, landing on the mat. Part of the TeamGym trampette program is performed with a vaulting apparatus, which is positioned between the trampette and the mat.

== See also ==
- European Gymnastics Championships
- European TeamGym Championships
- European Union of Gymnastics
