= Gymnastics at the 1990 Goodwill Games =

- Venue: Tacoma Dome (artistic gymnastics); Spokane Coliseum (rhythmic gymnastics)
- Location: (United States) Seattle, USA
- Start date: July 20, 1990
- End date: July 29, 1990

At the 1990 Goodwill Games, two different gymnastics disciplines were contested: artistic gymnastics and rhythmic gymnastics.

== Artistic Gymnastics ==
=== Medalists ===
Event	Gold	Silver	Bronze
Men
Team all-around	Soviet Union; Vitaly Scherbo; Valery Belenky; Valeri Liukin; Valentin Mogilny	United States; Lance Ringnald; Chris Waller; John Roethlisberger; Trent Dimas	China; Guo Linyao; Li Xiaoshuang Huang Huadong
Individual all-around	(Soviet Union) Vitaly Scherbo	(Soviet Union) Valery Belenky	(United States) Lance Ringnald
Floor	(Soviet Union) Valeri Liukin	(China) Li Xiaoshuang (Soviet Union) Vitaly Scherbo	none awarded
Pommel horse	(Soviet Union) Valentin Mogilny	(Soviet Union) Valery Belenky	(United States) Chris Waller
Rings	(Soviet Union) Valery Belenky	(Soviet Union) Valeri Liukin	(United States) Chris Waller
Vault	(Soviet Union) Vitaly Scherbo	(East Germany) Sylvio Kroll	(Soviet Union) Valery Belenky
Parallel bars	(China) Guo Linyao (Soviet Union) Valery Belenky	none awarded	(United States) Lance Ringnald
Horizontal bar	(Soviet Union) Vitaly Scherbo (United States) Lance Ringnald	none awarded	(Hungary) Fajkusz Csaba
Women
Team all-around	Soviet Union; Svetlana Boginskaya; Natalia Kalinina; Oksana Chusovitina; Tatiana Lysenko	United States; Kim Zmeskal; Betty Okino; Amy Scherr; Sandy Woolsey	China; Li Li; Wang Wenjing; Zhang Wenning; Zhang Xia
Individual all-around	(Soviet Union) Natalia Kalinina	(Soviet Union) Svetlana Boginskaya	(Hungary) Henrietta Onodi
Vault	(Soviet Union) Oksana Chusovitina	(Soviet Union) Natalia Kalinina	(Romania) Gina Gogean
Uneven bars	(China) Zhang Xia	(Soviet Union) Natalia Kalinina	(United States) Kim Zmeskal
Balance beam	(Soviet Union) Natalia Kalinina	(China) Zhang Wenning	(Soviet Union) Svetlana Boginskaya
Floor	(Soviet Union) Svetlana Boginskaya (Soviet Union) Natalia Kalinina	none awarded	(United States) Kim Zmeskal

== Rhythmic Gymnastics ==
=== Medalists ===
Event	Gold	Silver	Bronze
Individual all-around	(Soviet Union) Oksana Skaldina	(Bulgaria) Mila Marinova	(Soviet Union) Oksana Kostina
Rope	(Soviet Union) Oksana Skaldina	(Bulgaria) Mila Marinova	(Soviet Union) Oksana Kostina (Bulgaria) Neli Atanassova
Ball	(Soviet Union) Oksana Skaldina	(Soviet Union) Oksana Kostina (Bulgaria) Mila Marinova	none awarded
Hoop	(Bulgaria) Mila Marinova (Soviet Union) Oksana Skaldina (Soviet Union) Alexandra Timoshenko	none awarded	none awarded
Ribbon	(Soviet Union) Alexandra Timoshenko	(Soviet Union) Oksana Skaldina (Bulgaria) Mila Marinova	none awarded

== Details ==
=== Artistic Gymnastics ===
==== Men ====
===== Team All-Around =====
Rank	Country	Total
1st place, gold medalist(s)	Soviet Union (URS)	176.50
2nd place, silver medalist(s)	United States of America (USA)	172.55
3rd place, bronze medalist(s)	China (CHN)	172.35
4	East Germany (GDR)	171.50
5	Hungary (HUN)	170.75
6	Japan (JPN)	169.20
7	Romania (ROU)	169.10

===== Individual All-Around =====
Rank	Gymnast	Floor (gymnastics)	Pommel horse	Rings (gymnastics)	Vault (gymnastics)	Parallel bars	Horizontal bar	Total
1st place, gold medalist(s)	Vitaly Scherbo (URS)	9.850	9.900	9.900	9.950	9.750	9.850	59.200
2nd place, silver medalist(s)	Valery Belenky (URS)	9.750	9.850	9.900	9.600	9.900	9.650	58.650
3rd place, bronze medalist(s)	Lance Ringnald (USA)	9.750	9.700	9.600	9.550	9.800	9.800	58.200
4	Chris Waller (USA)	9.600	9.800	9.750	9.200	9.650	9.800	57.800
5	Csaba Fajkusz (HUN)	9.600	9.700	9.450	9.500	9.650	9.750	57.650
5	Sylvio Kroll (GDR)	9.400	9.650	9.650	9.800	9.800	9.200	57.500
7	Guo Linyao (CHN)	9.450	9.750	9.150	9.450	9.850	9.850	57.500
8	Miguel Rubio (ESP)	9.700	9.500	9.550	9.450	9.450	9.600	57.250
9	Yoshikazu Nakamura (JPN)	9.600	9.700	9.100	9.500	9.650	9.500	57.050
10	Jens Milbradt (GDR)	9.600	8.800	9.650	9.500	9.650	9.650	56.850
11	Kalofer Hristozov (BUL)	9.500	9.150	9.650	9.450	9.400	9.400	56.550
12	Szilveszter Csollány (HUN)	9.650	9.650	9.600	9.450	9.250	8.800	56.400
13	Adrian Sandu (ROU)	9.200	9.250	9.200	9.400	9.500	9.600	56.150
14	Shinji Gamou (JPN)	9.050	9.550	9.300	9.100	9.300	9.500	55.800
15	Li Xiaoshuang (CHN)	9.500	9.700	9.350	9.750	9.700	7.500	55.500
16	Adrian Ciuca (ROU)	9.050	9.500	9.400	9.050	8.400	9.300	55.000

===== Floor =====
Rank	Gymnast	Score
1st place, gold medalist(s)	Valeri Liukin (URS)	9.900
2nd place, silver medalist(s)	Li Xiaoshuang (CHN)	9.825
2nd place, silver medalist(s)	Vitaly Scherbo (URS)	9.825
4	Adrian Gal (ROU)	9.600
5	Miguel Rubio (ESP)	9.575
6	Sylvio Kroll (GDR)	9.450
6	Jens Milbradt (GDR)	9.450
8	Shinji Gamou (JPN)	9.350

===== Pommel Horse =====
Rank	Gymnast	Score
1st place, gold medalist(s)	Valentin Mogilny (URS)	9.975
2nd place, silver medalist(s)	Valery Belenky (URS)	9.950
3rd place, bronze medalist(s)	Chris Waller (USA)	9.900
4	Guo Linyao (CHN)	9.850
4	Huang Huadong (CHN)	9.850
6	Csaba Fajkusz (HUN)	9.725
6	Balázs Tóth (HUN)	9.725
8	Lance Ringnald (USA)	9.700

===== Rings =====
Rank	Gymnast	Score
1st place, gold medalist(s)	Valery Belenky (URS)	9.925
2nd place, silver medalist(s)	Valeri Liukin (URS)	9.900
3rd place, bronze medalist(s)	Chris Waller (USA)	9.750
4	Kalofer Hristozov (BUL)	9.700
5	Jens Milbradt (GDR)	9.675
6	Szilveszter Csollány (HUN)	9.625
6	Miguel Rubio (ESP)	9.625
8	John Roethlisberger (USA)	9.550

===== Vault =====
Rank	Gymnast	Score
1st place, gold medalist(s)	Vitaly Scherbo (URS)	9.925
2nd place, silver medalist(s)	Sylvio Kroll (GDR)	9.775
3rd place, bronze medalist(s)	Valery Belenky (URS)	9.762
4	Lance Ringnald (USA)	9.462
5	Li Xiaoshuang (CHN)	9.462
6	Huang Huadong (CHN)	9.412
7	Yoshikazu Nakamura (JPN)	9.300
8	Adrian Catanoiu (ROU)	9.100

===== Parallel Bars =====
Rank	Gymnast	Score
1st place, gold medalist(s)	Guo Linyao (CHN)	9.875
1st place, gold medalist(s)	Valery Belenky (URS)	9.875
3rd place, bronze medalist(s)	Lance Ringnald (USA)	9.800
4	Andre Hempel (GDR)	9.775
5	Balázs Tóth (HUN)	9.750
6	Vitaly Scherbo (URS)	9.700
7	Chris Waller (USA)	9.650
8	Li Xiaoshuang (CHN)	9.600

===== Horizontal Bar =====
Rank	Gymnast	Score
1st place, gold medalist(s)	Vitaly Scherbo (URS)	9.900
1st place, gold medalist(s)	Lance Ringnald (USA)	9.900
3rd place, bronze medalist(s)	Csaba Fajkusz (HUN)	9.825
4	Guo Linyao (CHN)	9.775
5	Miguel Rubio (ESP)	9.675
6	Valeri Liukin (URS)	9.400
7	Trent Dimas (USA)	9.300
8	Li Xiaoshuang (CHN)	8.200

==== Women ====
===== Team All-Around =====
Rank	Country	Vault (gymnastics)	Uneven bars	Balance beam	Floor (gymnastics)	Total
1st place, gold medalist(s)	Soviet Union (URS)	29.991	29.437	29.724	29.687	118.759
2nd place, silver medalist(s)	United States of America (USA)	29.549	29.749	29.525	29.661	118.484
3rd place, bronze medalist(s)	China (CHN)	29.012	29.750	29.472	29.399	117.573
Rank	Country	Rotation 1	Rotation 2	Rotation 3	Rotation 4	Total
4	Japan (JPN)	28.837	29.299	29.112	29.312	116.560
5	Spain (SPA)	29.412	29.187	29.287	28.537	116.423
6	Canada (CAN)	28.874	28.312	28.487	28.700	114.373
7	East Germany (GDR)	28.950	28.987	27.637	28.424	113.998

For these countries the scores for each rotation are known but not the apparatuses they correspond to.

===== Individual All-Around =====
Rank	Gymnast	Vault (gymnastics)	Uneven bars	Balance beam	Floor (gymnastics)	Total
1st place, gold medalist(s)	Natalia Kalinina (URS)	9.987	9.937	9.912	10.00	39.836
2nd place, silver medalist(s)	Svetlana Boginskaya (URS)	9.987	9.950	9.887	9.975	39.799
3rd place, bronze medalist(s)	Henrietta Onodi (HUN)	9.837	9.862	9.762	9.887	39.348
4	Betty Okino (USA)	9.862	9.737	9.812	9.887	39.298
5	Eva Rueda (ESP)	9.812	9.837	9.650	9.900	39.199
6	Kim Zmeskal (USA)	9.925	9.337	9.862	9.950	39.074
7	Zhang Wenning (CHN)	9.662	9.812	9.800	9.775	39.049
8	Mari Kosuge (JPN)	9.750	9.762	9.662	9.837	39.011
9	Gina Gogean (ROM)	9.837	9.512	9.737	9.900	38.986
10	Li Li (CHN)	9.775	9.937	9.875	9.300	38.887
11	Alicia Fernández (ESP)	9.662	9.925	9.750	9.375	38.712
12	Kathleen Stark (GDR)	9.787	9.725	9.587	9.487	38.586
13	Jana Gunther (GDR)	9.725	9.712	9.625	9.375	38.437
14	Janine Rankin (CAN)	9.687	9.812	9.075	9.650	38.224
15	Kelli Wolsey (CAN)	9.737	9.312	9.512	9.662	38.223
16	Kyoko Seo (JPN)	9.762	9.312	9.662	8.600	37.336

===== Vault =====
Rank	Gymnast	Score
1st place, gold medalist(s)	Oksana Chusovitina (URS)	9.962
2nd place, silver medalist(s)	Natalia Kalinina (URS)	9.918
3rd place, bronze medalist(s)	Gina Gogean (ROM)	9.874
4	Henrietta Onodi (HUN)	9.868
5	Mari Kosuge (JPN)	9.718
6	Kathleen Stark (GDR)	9.612
7	Eva Rueda (ESP)	9.524
8	Amy Scherr (USA)	9.493

===== Uneven Bars =====
Rank	Gymnast	Score
1st place, gold medalist(s)	Zhang Xia (CHN)	9.962
2nd place, silver medalist(s)	Natalia Kalinina (URS)	9.912
3rd place, bronze medalist(s)	Kim Zmeskal (USA)	9.900
4	Betty Okino (USA)	9.887
5	Henrietta Onodi (HUN)	9.862
6	Mari Kosuge (JPN)	9.850
7	Eva Rueda (ESP)	9.825
8	Li Li (CHN)	9.687

===== Balance Beam =====
Rank	Gymnast	Score
1st place, gold medalist(s)	Natalia Kalinina (URS)	9.962
2nd place, silver medalist(s)	Zhang Wenning (CHN)	9.950
3rd place, bronze medalist(s)	Svetlana Boginskaya (URS)	9.937
4	Kim Zmeskal (USA)	9.900
5	Li Li (CHN)	9.875
6	Betty Okino (USA)	9.862
7	Henrietta Onodi (HUN)	9.812
8	Mari Kosuge (JPN)	9.800

===== Floor =====
Rank	Gymnast	Score
1st place, gold medalist(s)	Svetlana Boginskaya (URS)	9.962
1st place, gold medalist(s)	Natalia Kalinina (URS)	9.962
3rd place, bronze medalist(s)	Kim Zmeskal (USA)	9.912
4	Henrietta Onodi (HUN)	9.875
4	Eva Rueda (ESP)	9.875
6	Betty Okino (USA)	9.712
7	Zhang Wenning (CHN)	9.387
8	Mari Kosuge (JPN)	9.325

=== Rhythmic Gymnastics ===
==== All-Around ====
Rank	Gymnast	Total
1st place, gold medalist(s)	Oksana Skaldina (URS)	39.55
2nd place, silver medalist(s)	Mila Marinova (BUL)	39.30
3rd place, bronze medalist(s)	Oksana Kostina (URS)	39.25
4	Alexandra Timoshenko (URS)	39.10
5	Neli Atanassova (BUL)	38.90
6	Ada Liberio Romo (ESP)	38.55
7	Joanna Bodak (POL)	38.25
8	Erika Akiyama (JPN)	38.15
8	Eliza Bialkowska (POL)	38.15
10	Monica Ferrandez Arenas (ESP)	38.10
11	Anita Balogh (HUN)	37.95
12	Erika Pal (HUN)	37.80
12	Yukari Kawamoto (JPN)	37.80
14	Jenifer Lovell (USA)	37.70
15	Diane Simpson (USA)	37.60
16	Vania Conte (ITA)	37.30
17	Irene Germini (ITA)	37.10
18	Caroline Hunt (USA)	36.90

==== Rope ====
Rank	Gymnast	Score
1st place, gold medalist(s)	Oksana Skaldina (URS)	9.900
2nd place, silver medalist(s)	Mila Marinova (BUL)	9.850
3rd place, bronze medalist(s)	Oksana Kostina (URS)	9.800
3rd place, bronze medalist(s)	Neli Atanassova (BUL)	9.800
5	Ada Liberio Romo (ESP)	9.600
5	Diane Simpson (USA)	9.600
7	Joanna Bodak (POL)	9.550
8	Erika Akiyama (JPN)	9.300

==== Ball ====
Rank	Gymnast	Score
1st place, gold medalist(s)	Oksana Skaldina (URS)	9.950
2nd place, silver medalist(s)	Oksana Kostina (URS)	9.900
2nd place, silver medalist(s)	Mila Marinova (BUL)	9.900
4	Neli Atanassova (BUL)	9.800
5	Ada Liberio Romo (ESP)	9.750
6	Erika Akiyama (JPN)	9.650
6	Joanna Bodak (POL)	9.650
8	Eliza Bialkowska (POL)	9.600

==== Hoop ====
Rank	Gymnast	Score
1st place, gold medalist(s)	Oksana Skaldina (URS)	9.900
1st place, gold medalist(s)	Mila Marinova (BUL)	9.900
1st place, gold medalist(s)	Alexandra Timoshenko (URS)	9.900
4	Neli Atanassova (BUL)	9.800
5	Ada Liberio Romo (ESP)	9.700
6	Joanna Bodak (POL)	9.650
7	Monica Ferrandez Arenas (ESP)	9.600
8	Diane Simpson (USA)	9.500

==== Ribbon ====
Rank	Gymnast	Score
1st place, gold medalist(s)	Alexandra Timoshenko (URS)	10.000
2nd place, silver medalist(s)	Oksana Skaldina (URS)	9.900
2nd place, silver medalist(s)	Mila Marinova (BUL)	9.900
4	Neli Atanassova (BUL)	9.800
5		
6	Monica Ferrandez Arenas (ESP)	
7	Erika Akiyama (JPN)	9.550
8	Ada Liberio Romo (ESP)	9.450
