= List of medalists at the UEG European Cup Final =

This is a list of medalists at the European Cup Final in Artistic and Rhythmic Gymnastics, organized by the European Union of Gymnastics from 1988 to 1995.

== Artistic gymnastics ==
1988 European Cup Final (Florence, Italy)

Event	Gold	Silver	Bronze	Ref.
Men's individual all-around	(Soviet Union) Sergei Kharkov	(Soviet Union) Vladimir Shepotschkin	(Italy) Boris Preti	
Women's individual all-around	(Soviet Union) Elena Shevchenko	(Bulgaria) Boriana Stoyanova	(Soviet Union) Natalia Laschenova	
Men's floor exercise	(Soviet Union) Sergei Kharkov	(Soviet Union) Vladimir Shepotschkin	(Italy) Yuri Chechi	
Men's pommel horse	(Bulgaria) Dimitar Taskov	(Soviet Union) Sergei Kharkov	(Bulgaria) Kalofer Hristozov	
Men's still rings	(Italy) Yuri Chechi	(Soviet Union) Sergei Kharkov	(Italy) Boris Preti	
Men's vault	(Soviet Union) Vladimir Shepotschkin	(Bulgaria) Dimitar Taskov	(Italy) Boris Preti	
Men's parallel bars	(Soviet Union) Vladimir Shepotschkin	(Italy) Boris Preti	(Italy) Yuri Chechi	
Men's horizontal bar	(Soviet Union) Sergei Kharkov	(Italy) Boris Preti	(Sweden) Johan Jonansson	
Women's vault	(Bulgaria) Boriana Stoyanova	(Soviet Union) Elena Shevchenko	(Hungary) Eszter Ovary	
Women's uneven bars	(Soviet Union) Natalia Laschenova	(Soviet Union) Elena Shevchenko	(Czechoslovakia) Iveta Polokova	
Women's balance beam	(Soviet Union) Elena Shevchenko	(Bulgaria) Boriana Stoyanova	(Soviet Union) Natalia Laschenova	
Women's floor exercise	(Soviet Union) Elena Shevchenko	(Bulgaria) Boriana Stoyanova	(Bulgaria) Diana Dudeva	

1991 European Cup Final

Event	Gold	Silver	Bronze	Ref.
Men's individual all-around	(Italy) Yuri Chechi	(Soviet Union) Alexei Voropaev	(Soviet Union) Grigory Misutin	
Women's individual all-around	(Soviet Union) Tatiana Gutsu	(Soviet Union) Elena Grudneva	(Spain) Eva Rueda	
Men's floor exercise	(Soviet Union) Grigory Misutin	(Bulgaria) Kalofer Hristozov (Italy) Paolo Bucci	—	
Men's pommel horse	(Hungary) Szilveszter Csollány (Bulgaria) Dimitar Taskov	—	(Bulgaria) Kalofer Hristozov	
Men's still rings	(Italy) Yuri Chechi	(Soviet Union) Alexei Voropaev	(Soviet Union) Grigory Misutin	
Men's vault	(Hungary) Zoltan Supola	(Soviet Union) Alexei Voropaev	(Soviet Union) Grigory Misutin	
Men's parallel bars	(Soviet Union) Alexei Voropaev	(Soviet Union) Grigory Misutin	(Bulgaria) Kalofer Hristozov	
Men's horizontal bar	(Italy) Yuri Chechi	(Hungary) Zoltan Supola	(Soviet Union) Alexei Voropaev	
Women's vault	(Soviet Union) Tatiana Gutsu	(Spain) Eva Rueda	(Soviet Union) Elena Grudneva	
Women's uneven bars	(Soviet Union) Tatiana Gutsu	(Soviet Union) Elena Grudneva	(Spain) Eva Rueda	
Women's balance beam	(Soviet Union) Tatiana Gutsu	(Soviet Union) Elena Grudneva	(Bulgaria) Maya Hristova	
Women's floor exercise	(Soviet Union) Tatiana Gutsu	(Soviet Union) Elena Grudneva	(Bulgaria) Silvia Mitova	

1993 European Cup Final

Event	Gold	Silver	Bronze	Ref.
Men's individual all-around	(Russia) Dmitri Karbanenko	(Russia) Dmitri Vasilenko	(Ukraine) Rustam Sharipov	
Women's individual all-around	(Russia) Oksana Fabrichnova	(Ukraine) Lilia Podkopayeva	(Romania) Lavinia Milosovici	
Men's floor exercise	(Russia) Dmitri Vasilenko	(Bulgaria) Yordan Yovchev (France) Jean Claude Legros	—	
Men's pommel horse	(France) Eric Poujade	(Russia) Dmitri Karbanenko	(Austria) Catalin Mircan	
Men's still rings	(Russia) Dmitri Vasilenko	(Bulgaria) Yordan Yovchev (Ukraine) Rustam Sharipov	—	
Men's vault	(Russia) Dmitri Karbanenko	(Hungary) Zoltan Supola	(Bulgaria) Kalofer Hristozov	
Men's parallel bars	(Russia) Dmitri Karbanenko	(Russia) Dmitri Vasilenko	(Ukraine) Yuri Yermakov (Ukraine) Rustam Sharipov (Romania) Nicu Stroia (Bulgaria) Kalofer Hristozov	
Men's horizontal bar	(Romania) Nicu Stroia	(Hungary) Csaba Fajkusz	(Russia) Dmitri Vasilenko	
Women's vault	(Romania) Lavinia Milosovici	(Ukraine) Lilia Podkopayeva	(Hungary) Andrea Molnar	
Women's uneven bars	(Romania) Lavinia Milosovici	(Israel) Maya Shani	(Russia) Yekaterina Vandisheva	
Women's balance beam	(Russia) Oksana Fabrichnova	(Ukraine) Ludmila Stovbchataya	(Ukraine) Lilia Podkopayeva	
Women's floor exercise	(Hungary) Andrea Molnar	(Romania) Lavinia Milosovici	(Russia) Oksana Fabrichnova	

1995 European Cup Final

Event	Gold	Silver	Bronze	Ref.
Men's individual all-around	(Russia) Yevgeny Shabayev	(Germany) Valery Belenky	(Italy) Yuri Chechi	
Women's individual all-around	(Russia) Svetlana Khorkina	(Romania) Simona Amânar	(Belarus) Elena Piskun	
Men's floor exercise	(Russia) Alexei Nemov	(Ukraine) Grigory Misutin	(Bulgaria) Yordan Yovchev	
Men's pommel horse	(Germany) Valery Belenky	(Russia) Alexei Nemov	(Ukraine) Grigory Misutin	
Men's still rings	(Italy) Yuri Chechi	(Croatia) Alexei Demyanov	(Romania) Dan Burinca	
Men's vault	(Russia) Alexei Nemov	(Russia) Yevgeny Shabayev	(Bulgaria) Yordan Yovchev	
Men's parallel bars	(Russia) Alexei Nemov (Ukraine) Rustam Sharipov	—	(Spain) Jesús Carballo (Italy) Boris Preti	
Men's horizontal bar	(Ukraine) Rustam Sharipov	(Russia) Yevgeny Shabayev	(Italy) Yuri Chechi (Italy) Boris Preti	
Women's vault	(Romania) Simona Amânar	(Ukraine) Lilia Podkopayeva	(Russia) Svetlana Khorkina	
Women's uneven bars	(Ukraine) Lilia Podkopayeva	(Russia) Svetlana Khorkina	(Romania) Gina Gogean	
Women's balance beam	(Ukraine) Lilia Podkopayeva	(Belarus) Elena Piskun	(Romania) Simona Amânar	
Women's floor exercise	(Romania) Simona Amânar	(Russia) Dina Kochetkova	(Ukraine) Lilia Podkopayeva (Russia) Svetlana Khorkina	

== Rhythmic gymnastics ==
1989 European Cup Final (Hanover, West Germany)

Event	Gold	Silver	Bronze	Ref.
Individual all-around	(Soviet Union) Alexandra Timoshenko	(Bulgaria) Adriana Dunavska	(Spain) Ana Bautista (Bulgaria) Julia Baicheva	
Rope	(Spain) Ana Bautista (Bulgaria) Adriana Dunavska	—	(Soviet Union) Alexandra Timoshenko	
Hoop	(Soviet Union) Oksana Skaldina	(Soviet Union) Alexandra Timoshenko	(Spain) Ana Bautista (Bulgaria) Adriana Dunavska (Bulgaria) Julia Baicheva	
Ball	(Soviet Union) Alexandra Timoshenko	(Spain) Ana Bautista (Soviet Union) Oksana Skaldina	—	
Ribbon	(Soviet Union) Alexandra Timoshenko	(Bulgaria) Adriana Dunavska (Soviet Union) Oksana Skaldina	—	

1991 European Cup Final (Brussels, Belgium)

Event	Gold	Silver	Bronze	Ref.
Individual all-around	(Soviet Union) Alexandra Timoshenko	(Soviet Union) Oksana Skaldina	(Bulgaria) Mila Marinova	
Rope	(Soviet Union) Alexandra Timoshenko	(Bulgaria) Mila Marinova (Bulgaria) Kristina Shikerova	—	
Hoop	(Soviet Union) Alexandra Timoshenko (Bulgaria) Mila Marinova	—	(Romania) Irina Deleanu (Bulgaria) Kristina Shikerova	
Ball	(Soviet Union) Alexandra Timoshenko (Bulgaria) Mila Marinova	—	(Soviet Union) Oksana Skaldina	
Clubs	(Soviet Union) Alexandra Timoshenko (Soviet Union) Oksana Skaldina (Bulgaria) Kristina Shikerova	—	—	

1993 European Cup Final (Málaga, Spain)

Event	Gold	Silver	Bronze	Ref.
Individual all-around	(Bulgaria) Maria Petrova	(Belarus) Larissa Lukyanenko	(Spain) Carolina Pascual	
Hoop	(Bulgaria) Maria Petrova	(Belarus) Larissa Lukyanenko	(Russia) Amina Zaripova	
Ball	(Belarus) Larissa Lukyanenko	(Bulgaria) Maria Petrova	(Spain) Carmen Acedo (Belarus) Tatiana Ogrizko (Russia) Julia Rosliakova	
Clubs	(Belarus) Larissa Lukyanenko	(Spain) Carolina Pascual	(Spain) Carmen Acedo (Russia) Amina Zaripova	
Ribbon	(Bulgaria) Maria Petrova	(Belarus) Larissa Lukyanenko	(Spain) Carolina Pascual	

1995 European Cup Final (Telford, Great Britain)

Event	Gold	Silver	Bronze	Ref.
Individual all-around	(Ukraine) Kateryna Serebrianska	(Ukraine) Elena Vitrychenko (Russia) Yana Batyrshina	—	
Rope	(Belarus) Larissa Lukyanenko (Ukraine) Kateryna Serebrianska	—	(Russia) Yana Batyrshina (Russia) Amina Zaripova	
Ball	(Belarus) Larissa Lukyanenko (Belarus) Olga Gontar	—	(Russia) Yana Batyrshina	
Clubs	(Ukraine) Kateryna Serebrianska	(Ukraine) Elena Vitrychenko (Russia) Yana Batyrshina (Russia) Amina Zaripova	—	
Ribbon	(Russia) Yana Batyrshina (Russia) Amina Zaripova	—	(Ukraine) Elena Vitrychenko	
