= 1991 Rhythmic Gymnastics Junior European Championships =

Gymnastics European competition

- Location: Lisbon, Portugal
- Start date: 04 July 1991
- End date: 7 July 1991

The 1991 Rhythmic Gymnastics Junior European Championships is the 3rd edition of the Rhythmic Gymnastics Junior European Championships, which took place from 4 July 1991 to 7 July 1991 in Lisbon, Portugal.

== Medal winners ==
Event	Gold	Silver	Bronze
Team Competition
Team	Soviet Union; Amina Zaripova; Elena Vitrichenko; Ekaterina Serebrianskaya	Bulgaria; Zornitsa Kalenska; Diana Popova; Iva Ivanova	Spain; Rosabel Espinosa; Carolina Borrell; Bárbara Plaza
Individual
All-Around	Zornitsa Kalenska; Bulgaria	Diana Popova; Bulgaria	Rosabel Espinosa; Spain; Amina Zaripova; Soviet Union
Hoop	Diana Popova; Bulgaria	Zornitsa Kalenska; Bulgaria; Ekaterina Serebrianskaya; Soviet Union	none awarded
Ball	Ekaterina Serebrianskaya; Soviet Union	Elena Vitrichenko; Soviet Union	Rosabel Espinosa; Spain
Clubs	Elena Vitrichenko; Soviet Union	Rosabel Espinosa; Spain	Carolina Borrell; Spain; Zornitsa Kalenska; Bulgaria; Amina Zaripova; Soviet Union
Ribbon	Diana Popova; Bulgaria	Rosabel Espinosa; Spain	Maria Sansaridou; Greece
Groups
All-Around	Spain; Verónica Bódalo; María Álvarez; Sonia Bermejo; Susana Gómez; Pilar Rodrigo; Eva Velasco	Soviet Union	Bulgaria

== Medal table ==
Rank	Nation	Gold	Silver	Bronze	Total
1	Bulgaria (BUL)	3	3	2	8
1	Soviet Union (URS)	3	3	2	8
3	Spain (ESP)	1	2	4	7
4	Greece (GRE)	0	0	1	1
Totals (4 entries)		7	8	9	24
