= Rosabel Espinosa =

Spanish rhythmic gymnast (born 1976)

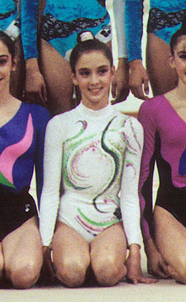

Personal information
- Full name: Rosabel Espinosa de la Casa
- Born: 18 May 1976 (age 50) Alicante, Spain

Gymnastics career
- Discipline: Rhythmic gymnastics
- Country represented: Spain; (1989-1993)
- Club: Club ECA
- Head coach: Emilia Boneva
- Retired: yes
Medal record
Rhythmic Gymnastics
Representing Spain
European Championships
Bronze medal – third place	1992 Stuttgart	Team
Junior European Championships
Silver medal – second place	1991 Lisbon	Clubs
Silver medal – second place	1991 Lisbon	Ribbon
Bronze medal – third place	1989 Tenerife	Team
Bronze medal – third place	1991 Lisbon	Team
Bronze medal – third place	1991 Lisbon	All-Around
Bronze medal – third place	1991 Lisbon	Ball

Rosabel Espinosa de la Casa (born 18 May 1976) is a retired Spanish rhythmic gymnast. She's a multiple European Championships medalist.

== Biography ==
Rosabel started practicing rhythmic gymnastics at the Escuela de Competición of Alicante (Club ECA) trained by Francisca Maneus (also known as Paqui Maneus). In December 1987, at the age of 11, she was 6th in the tournament «Objective '92» in Alicante. n 1988 she was called up for a selection of young promises "Barcelona 92", among them there were some future stars of the Spanish rhythmic gymnastics as Ada Liberio, Edi Moreno, Carmen Acedo, Carolina Pascual, Eider Mendizábal, Gemma Royo, Noelia Fernández and Montse Martín.

In 1989 she was chosen by Emilia Boneva to enter the junior national team. In April she participated in the Communaute Europeenne tournament, where she placed 10th. In June, at the Junior European Championships in Tenerife, she won bronze in team with Ada Liberio and Edi Moreno, finishing 6th in the All-Around and 5th with rope, hoop and ball. In October, at the Tournament of Les Arènes de l'Agora d'Évry, she won silver in teams.

In June 1990 she was 7th in the Ciudad de Alicante tournament. That same year, in the III Phase of the Spanish Cup she won bronze, and was 4th in the Final of the Spanish Cup. In April 1991 he won 7th place in the Ciudad de Alicante tournament. In July of that year she participated again in the Junior European Championships in Lisbon, winning bronze in team along Carolina Borrell, Bárbara Plaza and the substitute Peligros Piñero, bronze in the All-Around, bronze with ball and silver with clubs and ribbon. At the end of the year she was 8th at the Spanish Championships.

In March 1992, as part of the senior team, she participated in the Louvain-la-Neuve tournament, where she won gold in the All-Around and with clubs, silver with hoop, and bronze with rope and ball. In June she won team bronze at the European Championships in Stuttgart along Carmen Acedo and Carolina Pascual, she also finished 17th in the All-Around preliminaries but didn't compete in the final as only 2 gymnasts per country could qualify. Later she was crowned Spanish champion tied with Noelia Fernández.

In November 1993, she was selected for the World Championships, where she was 4th in the team competition with Carmen Acedo, Amaya Cardeñoso and Carolina Pascual, se performed only with rope, finishing 119th in the All-Around, and was 5th in the rope final tied with Cardeñoso and Magdalena Brzeska. She retired at the end of 1993.

Later Rosabel graduated in physical education, working as a teacher in a school in Rojales, and is a licensed national rhythmic gymnastics coach. She is currently a coach at the Club ECA in Alicante alongside former national gymnasts Vanesa Muñiz and Natalia Marín.

In September 2018, she traveled with several former gymnasts from the Spanish team to the World Championships in Sofia to meet again with the former national team coach Emilia Boneva, and a tribute dinner was also organized in Boneva's honor. After Boneva's death on 20 September 2019, Rosabel and other former national gymnasts gathered to pay tribute to her during the Euskalgym held on 16 November 2019. The event took place before 8,500 attendees at the Bilbao Exhibition Center de Baracaldo and was followed by a dinner in Boneva's honor.
