= Maria Stolbova =

Russian group rhythmic gymnast (born 1984)

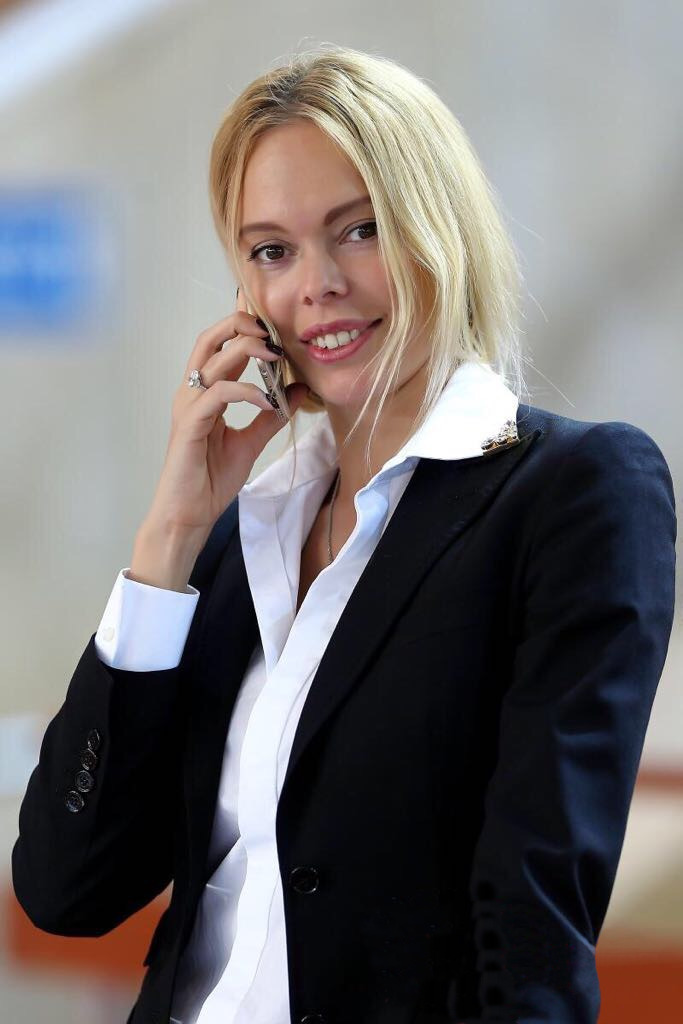

Personal information
- Alternative name: Мария Юрьевна Столбова
- Born: 3 May 1984 (age 42) Perm, Russian SFSR, Soviet Union
- Height: 176 cm (5 ft 9 in)

Gymnastics career
- Discipline: Rhythmic gymnastics
- Country represented: Russia
- Retired: 2002
Medal record
Representing Russia
Group Rhythmic Gymnastics
World Championships
Gold medal – first place	2002 New Orleans	Group
European Championships
Gold medal – first place	2002 Granada	Group

Maria Stolbova (Russian: Мария Юрьевна Столбова; born 3 May 1984 in Perm) is a Russian rhythmic gymnast, an Honoured Master of Sports, and a World and European champion.

== Biography ==
Stolbova was born in Perm in 1984. She won a silver medal at the Russian Junior Championship in 1996. In 1998, she was admitted to the Specialised School for Young Olympic Trainees No. 74 in Moscow. Later that year she became a member of the Russian youth team.

In 1999, she won the Championship of the Russian Armed Forces.

In 2002, she won gold in group exercises with the Russian national team (alongside Ksenia Dzhalaganiya and others) at both the World and European Rhythmic Gymnastics Championships.

After retiring from professional sport that year, she became a model, posing for photoshoots in Playboy, Maxim and other magazines.

In 2009, she married businessman George (Egor) Vitalievich Sirota.

In 2016, she moved to London with her family, where she opened two sports clubs: Centrum Gymnastics and Maria Stolbova’s Rhythmic Gymnastics Academy (where she works as a senior coach).
