= European Gymnastics Championships =

Annual gymnastics tournament

- Status: active
- Genre: sporting event
- Date: mid-year
- Frequency: annual
- Country: varying
- Inaugurated: 1955

European Gymnastics organises the European Gymnastics Championships for each of the following gymnastics disciplines:

== Events ==
=== Current ===
Discipline	Competition	First held	Current frequency
Artistic gymnastics	European Men's Artistic Gymnastics Championships	1955	Biennially (even years since 1990)
Artistic gymnastics	European Women's Artistic Gymnastics Championships	1957	Biennially (even years since 1990)
Artistic gymnastics	European Men's and Women's Artistic Gymnastics Individual Championships	2005	Biennially (odd years)
Trampoline	European Trampoline Championships	1969	Biennially (even years)
Rhythmic gymnastics	Rhythmic Gymnastics European Championships	1978	Annually
Acrobatic gymnastics	European Acrobatics Championships	1978	Biennially (odd years)
TeamGym	European TeamGym Championships	1996	Biennially (even years)
Aerobic gymnastics	Aerobic Gymnastics European Championships	1999	Biennially (odd years)

=== Defunct ===
Discipline	Competition	First held	Last held
Artistic gymnastics	European Cup in Artistic Gymnastics	1988	1995
Rhythmic gymnastics	European Cup in Rhythmic Gymnastics	1989	1995
Artistic gymnastics and rhythmic gymnastics	European Team Gymnastics Championships	1997	2003

== All-time medal table ==
Notes

- Countries are ranked by number of gold, silver and bronze medals, respectively.
- Results from junior and age group events were not taken into consideration.
- Detailed results from the European Acrobatics Championships are not currently available; therefore, only confirmed total medals for a select number of countries have been added to the table.
- Silver and bronze medals earned at the European Trampoline Championships from 1969 to 1981 are not known at the moment.
- Defunct NOCs are listed in italics.
- Last updated after the 2020 European Women's Artistic Gymnastics Championships

Senior results
		Acrobatic			Aerobic			Artistic (MAG, WAG, Individual)			Rhythmic			Trampoline			TeamGym			Combined			
Rank	Nation	1st place, gold medalist(s)	2nd place, silver medalist(s)	3rd place, bronze medalist(s)	1st place, gold medalist(s)	2nd place, silver medalist(s)	3rd place, bronze medalist(s)	1st place, gold medalist(s)	2nd place, silver medalist(s)	3rd place, bronze medalist(s)	1st place, gold medalist(s)	2nd place, silver medalist(s)	3rd place, bronze medalist(s)	1st place, gold medalist(s)	2nd place, silver medalist(s)	3rd place, bronze medalist(s)	1st place, gold medalist(s)	2nd place, silver medalist(s)	3rd place, bronze medalist(s)	1st place, gold medalist(s)	2nd place, silver medalist(s)	3rd place, bronze medalist(s)	Total
1	Russia	?	?	?	13	15	11	90	65	67	100	44	23	84	42	24	0	0	0	287	167	124	578
2	Soviet Union (and CIS)	?	?	?	0	0	0	141	95	57	26	18	12	37	15	6	0	0	0	204	128	75	407
3	Romania	0	0	0	27	13	17	77	76	61	0	0	2	0	0	0	0	0	0	102	91	84	277
4	Ukraine	?	?	?	0	0	2	25	21	34	32	34	30	11	12	26	0	0	0	68	67	92	227
5	Bulgaria	?	?	?	2	1	4	13	14	13	45	21	41	4	3	5	0	0	0	64	39	63	166
6	France	?	?	?	6	10	12	15	25	20	1	4	3	29	22	23	0	0	0	61	61	58	170
7	Germany (and FRG)	?	?	?	0	0	0	24	36	46	0	0	2	35	26	24	1	0	2	60	62	74	196
8	Great Britain	?	?	?	0	0	0	20	30	17	0	0	0	28	32	40	0	0	0	48	62	57	167
9	Belarus	?	?	?	0	0	0	8	14	12	10	31	30	21	20	20	0	0	0	39	65	62	166
10	Italy	0	0	0	6	6	8	21	14	24	1	7	10	0	0	0	0	0	0	28	27	42	97
11	Hungary	0	2	1	4	10	8	20	12	13	0	0	3	0	0	0	0	0	0	24	24	25	73
12	Spain	0	0	0	9	7	2	8	7	7	1	2	9	6	5	14	0	0	0	24	21	32	77
13	Denmark	0	0	0	0	0	0	0	0	0	0	0	0	2	3	7	21	8	12	23	11	19	53
14	Portugal	?	?	?	0	0	1	0	0	0	0	0	0	19	23	19	0	0	0	19	23	20	62
15	Belgium	10	11	?	0	0	0	2	1	2	0	0	0	4	4	3	0	0	0	16	16	5	36
16	Sweden	0	0	0	0	0	0	4	8	6	0	0	0	2	2	4	9	18	9	15	28	19	60
17	Greece	0	0	0	0	0	0	14	6	8	1	6	2	0	0	0	0	0	0	15	12	10	37
18	Switzerland	?	?	?	0	0	0	13	7	18	0	0	0	1	1	1	0	0	0	14	8	19	41
19	Czechoslovakia	0	0	0	0	0	0	14	5	12	0	1	4	0	0	0	0	0	0	14	6	16	36
20	Poland	?	?	?	0	0	0	5	7	9	0	0	0	7	8	9	0	0	0	12	15	18	45
21	Yugoslavia	0	0	1	0	0	0	12	7	11	0	0	0	0	0	0	0	0	0	12	7	12	31
22	East Germany	0	0	0	0	0	0	11	16	21	0	0	0	0	0	0	0	0	0	11	16	21	48
23	Israel	6	0	5	0	0	0	2	4	8	3	4	5	0	0	0	0	0	0	11	8	18	37
24	Netherlands	0	0	1	0	0	0	8	12	10	0	0	0	1	2	2	0	0	0	9	14	13	36
25	Slovenia	0	0	0	0	0	0	6	5	6	0	0	0	0	0	0	0	0	0	6	5	6	17
26	Azerbaijan	?	?	?	1	0	0	0	1	0	1	2	8	1	1	1	0	0	0	3	4	9	16
27	Turkey	0	0	0	0	1	0	2	3	3	1	0	0	0	0	0	0	0	0	3	4	3	10
28	Iceland	0	0	0	0	1	1	0	0	0	0	0	0	0	0	0	2	5	2	2	6	3	11
29	Finland	0	0	0	0	0	0	2	4	5	0	0	0	0	0	0	0	1	2	2	5	7	14
30	Norway	0	0	0	0	0	0	0	1	0	0	0	0	0	0	0	2	3	8	2	4	8	14
31	Georgia	1	0	1	0	0	0	0	0	0	0	0	0	1	3	1	0	0	0	2	3	2	7
32	Lithuania	1	3	0	0	0	0	1	0	1	0	0	0	0	0	0	0	0	0	2	3	1	6
33	Croatia	0	0	0	0	0	0	2	7	1	0	0	0	0	0	0	0	0	0	4	7	1	12
34	Armenia	0	0	0	0	0	0	1	3	5	0	0	0	0	0	0	0	0	0	1	3	5	9
35	Czech Republic	0	0	0	0	0	0	0	1	1	0	0	0	0	0	0	1	0	1	1	1	2	4
36	Latvia	0	0	0	0	0	0	1	1	1	0	0	0	0	0	0	0	0	0	1	1	1	3
36	Slovakia	0	0	0	0	0	0	0	0	1	0	0	0	1	1	0	0	0	0	1	1	1	3
38	Albania	0	0	0	0	0	0	1	0	0	0	0	0	0	0	0	0	0	0	1	0	0	1
38	Ireland	0	0	0	0	0	0	1	0	0	0	0	0	0	0	0	0	0	0	1	0	0	1
40	Austria	0	0	1	0	1	0	0	1	1	0	0	0	0	0	0	0	0	0	0	2	2	4
41	Estonia	0	0	0	0	0	0	0	0	0	0	0	1	0	0	0	0	1	0	0	1	1	2
42	Cyprus	0	0	0	0	0	0	0	0	1	0	0	0	0	0	0	0	0	0	0	0	1	1
42	Luxembourg	0	0	0	0	0	0	0	0	1	0	0	0	0	0	0	0	0	0	0	0	1	1
42	Moldova	0	0	0	0	0	0	0	0	0	0	0	0	0	0	1	0	0	0	0	0	1	1

== See also ==
- Gymnastics at the European Games
