= Kristina Shikerova =

Bulgarian rhythmic gymnast

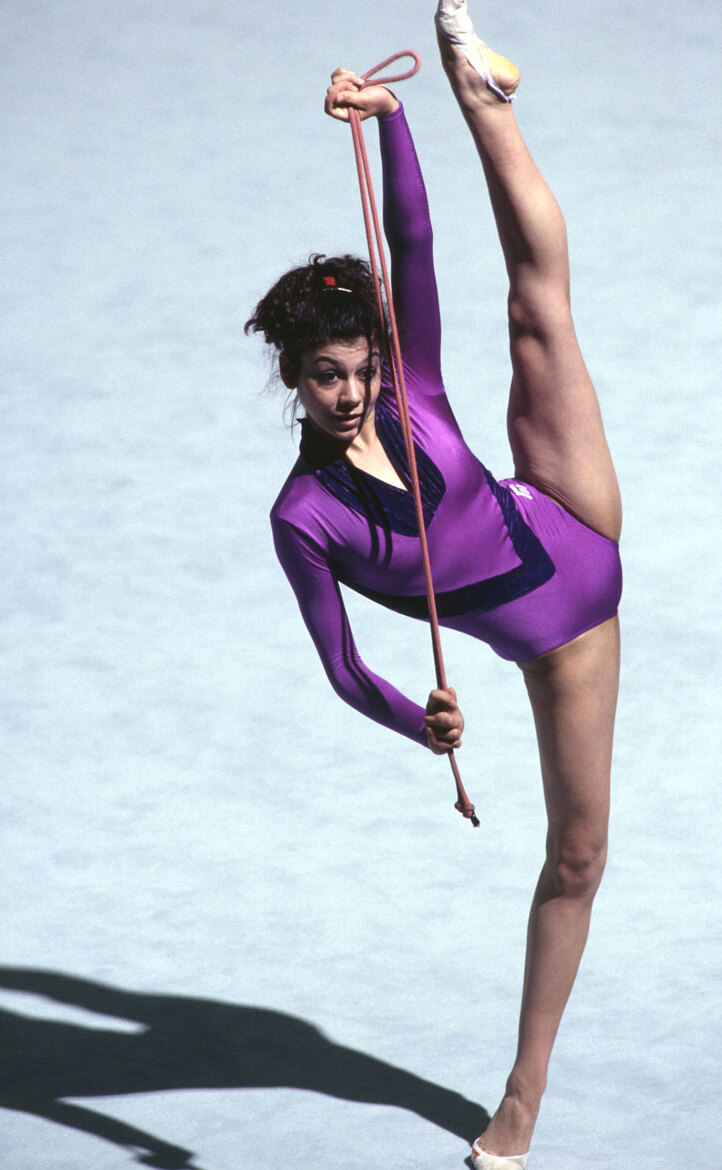
- Shikerova competing with rope in 1991

Gymnastics career
- Discipline: Rhythmic gymnastics
- Country represented: Bulgaria
- Retired: yes
Medal record
Rhythmic gymnastics
Representing Bulgaria
Event	1st	2nd	3rd
World Championships	0	2	0
European Championships	1	2	0
Total	1	4	0
World Championships
Silver medal – second place	1991 Piraeus	Team
Silver medal – second place	1991 Piraeus	Rope
European Championships
Silver medal – second place	1993 Bucharest	Group All-Around
Silver medal – second place	1993 Bucharest	Six Ropes
Gold medal – first place	1993 Bucharest	4 Hoops + 2 Pairs of Clubs

Kristina Shikerova (Bulgarian: Кристина Шикерова) is a retired Bulgarian rhythmic gymnast. She competed as both an individual and group member and won medals at the European Championships and World Championships. She now works as a coach.

== Personal life ==
Shikerova has three children with a businessman whom she was married to for over twenty years before they divorced. She coaches her daughter Siyana in gymnastics. In 2023, she received a degree in sports from the National Sports Academy "Vasil Levski".

== Career ==
Shikerova began training in artistic gymnastics at age 6 and was introduced to rhythmic gymnastics at age 7 by a coach she met at a competition. She joined the national team at age 10, where she trained for 14-15 hours a day.

At the European Cup in June 1991, she won a gold medal in the clubs final and finished fourth in the all-around. Her best performance at an international competition was that October at the 1991 World Championship in Piraeus, where she won the silver medal in the rope final and another silver medal in the team competition, along with her teammates, Mila Marinova and Maria Petrova. She was also fourth in the individual all-around as well as in the hoop final.

In 1993, Shikerova became a member of the national group. As part of the group, she competed at the 1993 Bucharest European Championships. There, she and the group won two silver medals, in the all-around and in six ropes, as well as the gold medal in four hoops and two pairs of club.,

Shikerova retired in 1994 and began coaching at Levski Club. After coaching there for more than a decade, in 2017, she founded her own gymnastics club.
