= Julia Baicheva =

Bulgarian gymnast

- Юлия Байчева
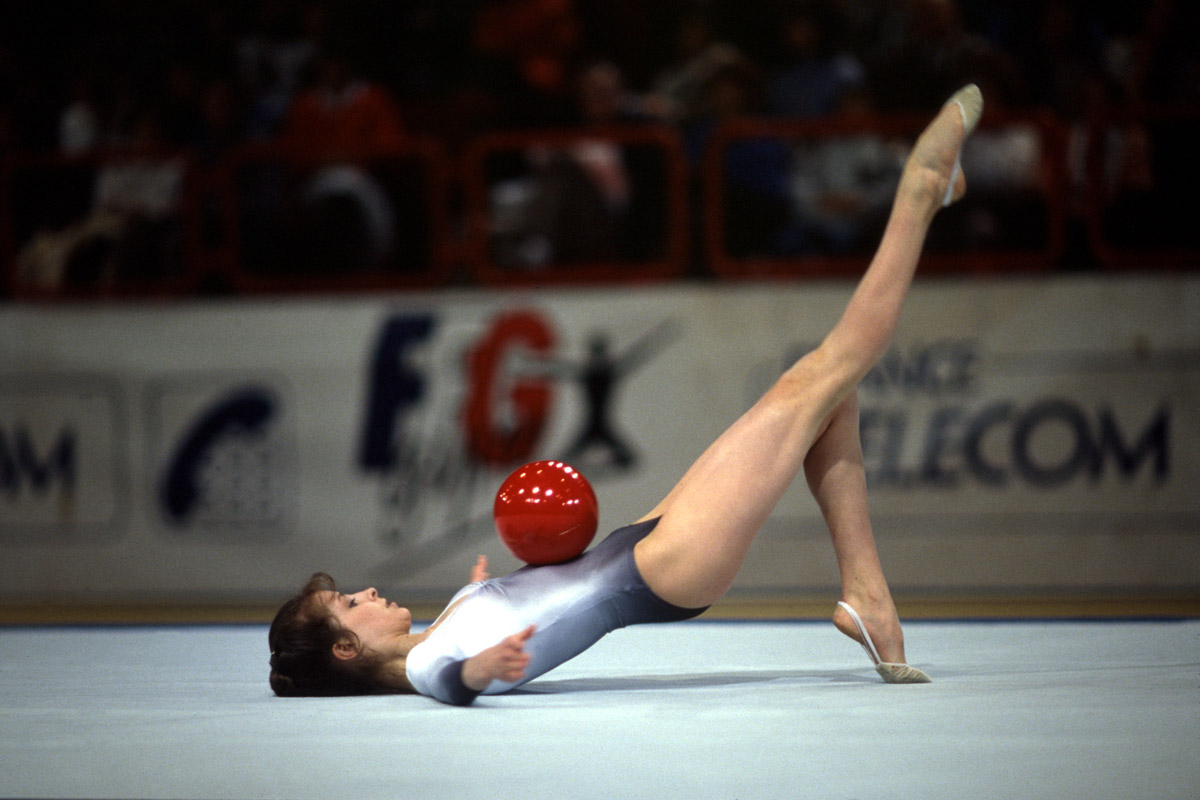

Personal information
- Born: 12 February 1972 (age 54) Plovdiv, Bulgaria

Gymnastics career
- Discipline: Rhythmic gymnastics
- Country represented: Bulgaria (1989-1993)
- Head coach: Neshka Robeva
- Retired: yes
Medal record
Representing Bulgaria
European Championships
Gold medal – first place	1990 Gothenburg	All-Around
Silver medal – second place	1990 Gothenburg	Team
Silver medal – second place	1990 Gothenburg	Hoop
Silver medal – second place	1990 Gothenburg	Clubs
Bronze medal – third place	1990 Gothenburg	Rope
Bronze medal – third place	1990 Gothenburg	Ball
World Championships
Gold medal – first place	1989 Sarajevo	Team
Gold medal – first place	1993 Alicante	Team
Silver medal – second place	1989 Sarajevo	Ribbon
Bronze medal – third place	1993 Alicante	Rope

Julia Baicheva (Bulgarian: Юлия Байчева; born 12 February 1972) is a Bulgarian former rhythmic gymnast. She is the 1990 European champion and also won medals at the World championships. She now works as a coach.

== Personal life ==
Baicheva was born in Plovdiv on 12 February 1972. She married Georgi Dukov, a fellow athlete, but became widowed in 1996 after he died in a car accident. She later remarried.

== Career ==
Baicheva trained under Neshka Robeva and Lilia Ignatova at the Levski club.

Baicheva debuted internationally at the World Championships in Sarajevo in 1989, where she won gold in the team event along with Adriana Dunavska and Bianka Panova. Individually, she won silver with ribbon.

She attempted to quit gymnastics twice in 1990. However, her best competition was that year at the European Championships in Gothenburg, where she won the all-around title. She won medals in every event final, winning silver with hoop and clubs and bronze with rope and ball. In the team event, she also won silver with her teammates Dimitrinka Todorova and Neli Atanassova.

In 1993, she participated in the World Championships in Alicante, where she was 9th in the all-around and won bronze in the rope final. She also qualified for the hoop and clubs finals; she was 8th in both. She won gold in teams along with Maria Petrova and Branimira Dimitrova.

After her competitive career, she began to coach at Levski. In 2016, a member of the national group, Tsvetelina Stoyanova, attempted suicide, and Baicheva commented on the incident to condemn allegations that the gymnastics federation had pushed her too hard or had removed her from the group to add a new member with better connections. In 2017, she moved to teach at the "Sofia Sport" club founded by Kristina Shikerova.
