= Victoria Stadnik =

Ukrainian rhythmic gymnast

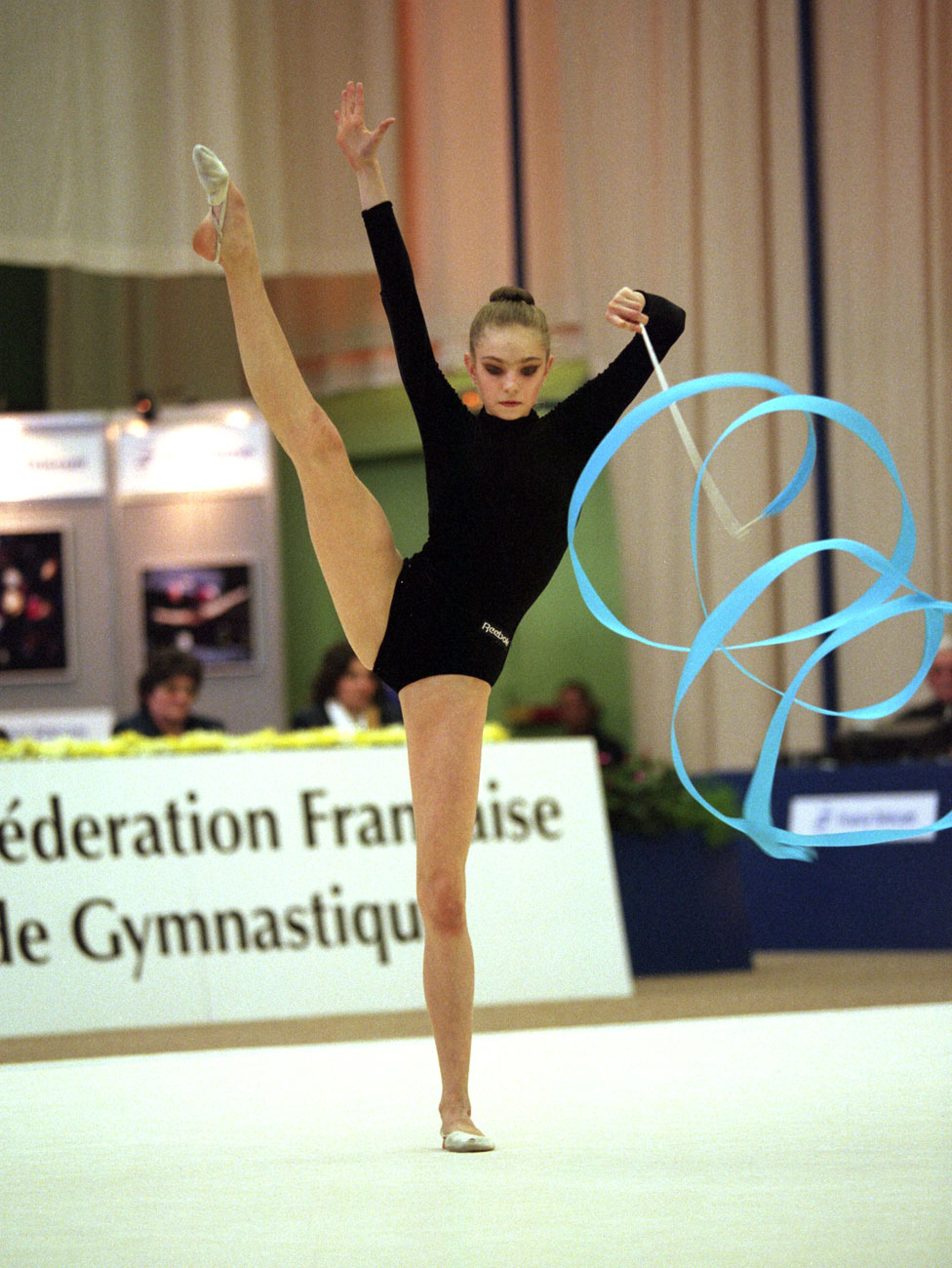
- Viktoria Stadnik, Corbeil-Essonnes (France)14/05/95

Personal information
- Born: November 25, 1979 (age 46) Odessa, USSR

Gymnastics career
- Discipline: Rhythmic gymnastics
- Country represented: Ukraine
Medal record
World Championships
Bronze medal – third place	1995 Vienna	Team
Bronze medal – third place	1996 Budapest	5 Hoops
Junior European Championships
Bronze medal – third place	1993 Bucharest	Team
Bronze medal – third place	1993 Bucharest	Rope
Bronze medal – third place	1993 Bucharest	Ball
Bronze medal – third place	1993 Bucharest	Ribbon

Victoria Stadnik (born 25 November 1979 in Odessa, USSR) is an individual and group rhythmic gymnast who competed at the 1995 and 1996 World Rhythmic Gymnastics Championships. She competed and won multiple bronze medals at the 1993 Rhythmic Gymnastics European Championships.
