= Kristina Kliukevičiūtė =

Lithuanian rhythmic gymnast

- Born: 10 July 1975 (age 51) Kaunas, Lithuanian SSR, Soviet Union

Gymnastics career
- Discipline: Rhythmic gymnastics
- Country represented: Lithuania
Medal record
Rhythmic Gymnastics
Representing Soviet Union
Junior European Championships
Gold medal – first place	1989 Tenerife	Clubs
Silver medal – second place	1989 Tenerife	Team
Silver medal – second place	1989 Tenerife	Hoop
Bronze medal – third place	1989 Tenerife	All-around
Bronze medal – third place	1989 Tenerife	Rope

Kristina Kliukevičiūtė (born 10 July 1975 in Kaunas) is a Lithuanian rhythmic gymnast. She was the first gymnast to represent Lithuania at the Olympics in 1996 and was a ten-time national champion. She now works as a coach.

== Biography ==
Kliukevičiūtė was born in Kaunas. She began artistic gymnastics in kindergarten, but after a fall from the balance beam, she became scared of training. Her parents took her to watch the rhythmic gymnasts' training to calm her down, and she became fascinated with the sport.

She received a Master of Sports, International Class in 1989. From 1989 to 1998, she won the all-around at the national championships ten consecutive times, and she was also the Soviet junior champion in 1988 and 1989. Recalling her life growing up in the Soviet sports system, Kliukevičiūtė said that she was forced to remain at an extremely low weight and that gymnasts found many methods to hide food and tamper with their scales to make their weight look lower.

She competed at the 1989 Junior European Championships, where she won a total of five medals, one gold (clubs), two silver (team and hoop), and two bronze (all-around, rope). In 1990, she won the senior Soviet bronze all-around medal.

After Lithuania regained independence in 1990, she competed at both editions of the Baltic Sea Games in 1993 and 1997 and won both.

Kliukevičiūtė hoped to compete at the 1992 Summer Olympics in Barcelona, but she did not qualify, a result that was so disappointing that she almost quit gymnastics. She was invited to compete for the Russian team before she had a series of injuries, including a broken leg and torn ligament, and Kliukevičiūtė again considered quitting.

However, she recovered and continued training, and she successfully represented Lithuania in the rhythmic gymnastics individual all-around competition at the 1996 Summer Olympics in Atlanta. There she was 37th in the qualification round and did not advance to the semifinal. She was the first gymnast to represent Lithuania at the Olympics.

She worked as a coach at the Kaunas Sports School from 1997 to 2009.
