= Verónica Bódalo =

Spanish rhythmic gymnast

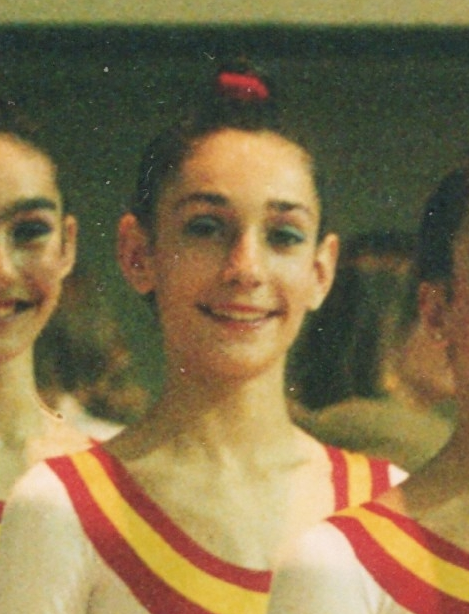

Personal information
- Full name: Verónica Bódalo Climent
- Born: June 12, 1976 (age 50) Alicante, Spain

Gymnastics career
- Discipline: Rhythmic gymnastics
- Country represented: Spain; (1990-1991)
- Club: Club Jitte / Club ECA / Club Atlético Montemar
- Retired: yes
Medal record
Rhythmic Gymnastics
Representing Spain
Junior European Championships
Gold medal – first place	1991 Lisbon	Group All-Around

Verónica Bódalo Climent (born 12 June 1976) is a former Spanish rhythmic gymnast who was European champion in 1991 with the national junior group.

== Career ==
Verónica took in rhythmic gymnastics when she was 4 years old, later competing with the children's group of the Club Jitte trained by Francisca Maneus and later moving on to the ECA Club (School of Competition of Alicante) of Paqui Maneus and Pancracia Sirvent, although she was also part of the Club Atlético Montemar.

With the Jitte Club she participated in the children's category in the 1987 Spanish Ensemble Championship in Onteniente (5th place) and in 1988 in Playa de Aro (4th place). In 1988 she won the gold medal in the Individual Tournament "Trofeo Fallas". In 1989 she obtained the bronze in a Tournament in Tarragona. In December of that same year he won the bronze in the general of the first category with Club Atlético Montemar in the Spanish Team Championship held in Torrelavega, in addition to the bronze in the 12 clubs final and the gold in the final of 2 balls, 2 ropes and 2 hoops. In that group there were also some gymnasts who belonged or would belong to the team, such as Carolina Pascual, Mónica Ferrández or Noelia Fernández, and would be trained by Rosa Menor.

In 1990, integrating the ECA Club, she achieved 10th place in the All-Around of the junior category and the silver medal in the clubs' final at the Spanish Championship in Palencia. That same season, as part of the group of ECA, she was the junior silver medalist at the Spanish Group Championship, held in Zaragoza. That year she was chosen to join the junior group of the Spanish national rhythmic gymnastics team.

In 1991 Verónica finished in 8th place in the 1st phase of the Spanish Cup, held in Tenerife. Later, she won the gold medal for Communities in the 3rd phase of the Spanish Cup in Zaragoza and in the Final of the Spanish Cup in Malaga. That same year he achieved bronze with ECA in the youth category of the Spanish Championship in Alicante, as well as bronze with rope, hoop and ball, and silver with clubs. As part of the Spanish junior group, in 1991 she won the gold medal at the Caserta International Tournament. That same year she won the gold medal at the Junior European Championships, held in Lisbon. The group was made up of Verónica, María Álvarez, Sonia Bermejo, Susana Gómez, Pilar Rodrigo and Eva Velasco, as well as Estefanía Ariza and Laura Bartolomé as substitutes. The same year the Spanish Federation of Gymnastics awarded them the Gymnastic Merit Medal.

She retired from rhythmic gymnastics in 1992. Later she has dedicated herself to training girls, starting at the ECA Club and since 1999 leading the Municipal School of Rhythmic Gymnastics of Altea.

== Routine music information ==
Year	Apparatus	Music Title
1987	Free Hands	The Mission OST by Ennio Morricone
1988	Ball	"The Pink Panther Theme" by Henry Mancini
1988	Free Hnads	music by Dire Straits
1989	12 clubs	"Una rosa es una rosa" by Mecano
1991	6 ropes	music from the ballet Arraigo by Jerónimo Maesso
