= Stella Salapatiyska =

Bulgarian rhythmic gymnast and coach

- Стела Салапатийска
- Born: 25 April 1979 (age 47) Plovdiv, Bulgaria

Gymnastics career
- Discipline: Rhythmic gymnastics
- Country represented: Bulgaria; (1993-1997)
- Head coach: Neshka Robeva
- Retired: yes
Medal record
Representing Bulgaria
Rhythmic Gymnastics
Junior European Championships
Gold medal – first place	1993 Bucharest	Team
Bronze medal – third place	1993 Bucharest	All-Around
European Championships
Bronze medal – third place	1996 Asker	Team

Stela Salapatiyska (Bulgarian: Стела Салапатийска; born 25 April 1979) is a former Bulgarian rhythmic gymnast who now works as a coach. She is a multiple-time European Championships medalist.

== Career ==
Salapatiyska won the bronze medal in the all-around at the 1993 Junior European Championships held in Bucharest. She also won gold in the team competition with her teammates Boriana Docheva and Elena Stefanova.

At the 1996 European Championships in Asker, she won the team bronze along with her teammate Diana Popova. She also placed fifth in the individual all-around competition and tied for seventh in the ball final. Although she had placed higher than Popova (who was seventh in the all-around), Popova was chosen over her to compete at the 1996 Summer Olympics.

In 1997, at the European Championships in Patras, she placed seventh in the all-around, sixth in the rope final and seventh in the ribbon final.

Salapatiyska was removed from the national team before the 1997 World Championships due to conflicts with the national coach, Neshka Robeva, over her abusive treatment. Salapatiyska alleged experiencing physical abuse as well as insults. She was suspended from competing for two years, and with little hope that she could continue her competitive career afterward, she chose to study to become a coach instead.

Although she received offers to work abroad, she stayed in Bulgaria and began coaching at the club founded by Iliana Raeva. She has coached gymnasts such as Elizabeth Paisieva.

== Personal life ==
Salapatiyska is married to Boyan Naydenov, a football manager. They had their first child, a daughter, in 2006.
