= Silvia Yustos =

Spanish rhythmic gymnast and trainer

- Full name: Silvia Yustos Sánchez
- Born: 28 March 1971 (age 55) Valladolid, Spain

Gymnastics career
- Discipline: Rhythmic gymnastics
- Country represented: Spain; (1985-1989)
- Club: E.T.G. Valladolid
- Head coach: Emilia Boneva
- Retired: yes
Medal record
Representing Spain
World Championships
Bronze medal – third place	1989 Sarajevo	Team

Silvia Yustos Sánchez (born 28 March 1971) is a former Spanish rhythmic gymnast and coach.

== Career ==
She was champion of Spain in the pre-junior category in 1980 and in second category in 1984, in addition to having 5 titles for apparatuses in honor category.

She joined the Spanish national team in 1985, winning gold at the City of Lisbon tournament. In1989, at the World Championships in Sarajevo she won bronze in team alongside Ana Bautista and Ada Liberio.

After her retirement she earned a degree in primary education and physical education and a license in physical education from the University of León. She then worked as a coach for some time. Among her pupils were Sara Bayón and Ana María Peláz. As of early 2024, she works as a teacher.

== Legacy and influence ==
Silvia was one of the longest-lived gymnasts on the national team during the 1980s. Her teammate, Montse Martín, spoke in 2019 about the characteristics as a gymnast that she attributed to her:

A gymnast with a lot of flexibility, she had a great elegance and a nice sensitivity that made her connect with the public quickly [...] Subsequently, she has become a respected national coach.
