= 1989 Rhythmic Gymnastics Junior European Championships =

Gymnastics European competition

- Location: Tenerife, Spain
- Start date: 15 June 1989
- End date: 18 June 1989

The 1989 Rhythmic Gymnastics Junior European Championships is the 2nd edition of the Rhythmic Gymnastics Junior European Championships, which took place from 15 June 1989 to 18 June 1989 in Tenerife, Spain.

== Medal winners ==
Event	Gold	Silver	Bronze
Team Competition
Team	Bulgaria; Mila Marinova; Dimitrinka Todorova; Teodora Blagoeva	Soviet Union; Kristina Kliukevičiūtė; Elena Shamatulskaya; Natalia Sinitaina	Spain; Rosabel Espinosa; Ada Liberio; Edi Moreno
Individual
All-Around	Dimitrinka Todorova; Bulgaria	Mila Marinova; Bulgaria	Kristina Kliukevičiūtė; Soviet Union
Rope	Dimitrinka Todorova; Bulgaria; Mila Marinova; Bulgaria	none awarded	Kristina Kliukevičiūtė; Soviet Union
Hoop	Mila Marinova; Bulgaria	Dimitrinka Todorova; Bulgaria; Kristina Kliukevičiūtė; Soviet Union	none awarded
Ball	Dimitrinka Todorova; Bulgaria; Mila Marinova; Bulgaria; Elena Shamatulskaya; Soviet Union	none awarded	none awarded
Clubs	Kristina Kliukevičiūtė; Soviet Union	Dimitrinka Todorova; Bulgaria; Ada Liberio; Spain; Natalia Sinitaina; Soviet Union	none awarded
Groups
All-Around	Bulgaria	Soviet Union	Spain; Carmen Acedo; Noelia Fernández; Ruth Goñi; Eider Mendizábal; Montserrat Martín; Gemma Royo; Cristina Chapuli; Diana Martín

== Medal table ==
Rank	Nation	Gold	Silver	Bronze	Total
1	Bulgaria (BUL)	8	3	0	11
2	Soviet Union (URS)	2	4	2	8
3	Spain (ESP)	0	1	1	2
Totals (3 entries)		10	8	3	21
