= TeamGym =

Gymnastics competition

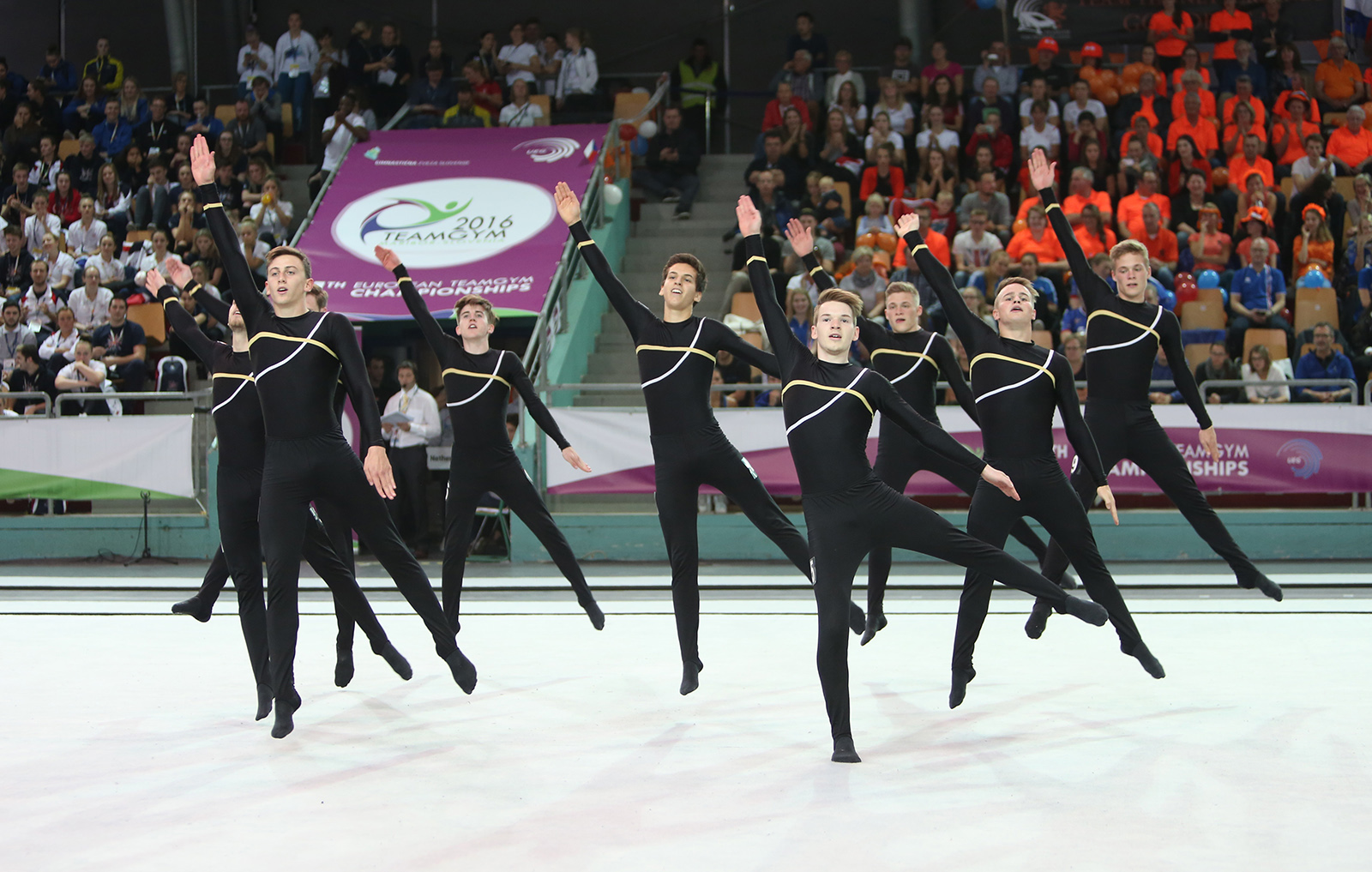
2016-EM Maribor Oeft Team

TeamGym is a form of competition created by the European Union of Gymnastics. The first official competition was held in Finland in 1996. Originally named EuroTeam, TeamGym received its current name in 2002. From 1996 to 2008, the European Championships was an event for clubs; since 2010 the competition is contested with national teams representing different countries. TeamGym events consist of three sections: women, men and mixed teams. Gymnasts perform skills in three different disciplines: floor, tumbling and trampette. In common for the performance is effective teamwork, good technique in the elements and spectacular acrobatic skills.

A variation of the sport in the United States is governed by USA Gymnastics under the Gymnastics for All (GfA) discipline.

== Events ==
=== Floor ===
All members of the Team take part in the floor program, composed of a mixture of dance, flexibility and skill. The routine has to be skillfully choreographed and the judges look out for gymnasts to be synchronised and for all gymnasts to correctly perform each element.

Within the routine you must include 10 elements on the TeamGym Code of Points. These can differ for each team.

Elements include:

- Leaps, jumps or hops - Acro elements - Balances - Group lift - Flexibilty element

Floor routines are performed to music.

=== Trampet ===
A trampet is a small square trampoline used in gymnastics. In TeamGym, the trampet is positioned at the end of a 25-meter-runway in front of a mat. The trampet is adjusted at an angle, tilted towards the gymnast, who approaches the trampet at a run. The gymnast jumps onto the trampet and performs a somersault, landing on the mat. Part of the TeamGym trampet program is performed with a vaulting apparatus, which is positioned between the trampet and the mat.

Trampet programs are performed to music. Each team completes three consecutive rounds. During each round, six gymnasts perform one skill each. At least one round is performed using the vaulting table. The first round is usually the "team-round" where every gymnast competes the same skill. Each athlete closely follows the previous athlete without pause, making for a high-speed program. This is referred to as "streaming". At least two gymnasts have to be moving (usually one is running and the other one is about to take off from the trampet and perform an element) or else there will be a deduction of points made towards the team.

Beginners usually start with simple jumps, such as the straight, tuck, star, straddle and pike jumps. Intermediate moves include tuck front, pike front, and straight front somersaults, while advanced moves include straight halves, straight fulls and doubles - with or without twists. Backward moves such as tuck backs or straight backs are not usually performed because the gymnast approaches the trampet at a forward run, making it difficult to land such moves.

=== Tumbling ===
Again, here there are three runs (rounds) involved. The “Team Run”, like trampet, all six gymnasts must perform the same series. One has to include all six gymnasts doing a forwards series. Another round must include all gymnasts performing a backwards series. Each series must have at least three different acrobatic elements at European level.

== See also ==
- European Gymnastics Championships
- European Union of Gymnastics
