= European Gymnastics =

European gymnastics governing body

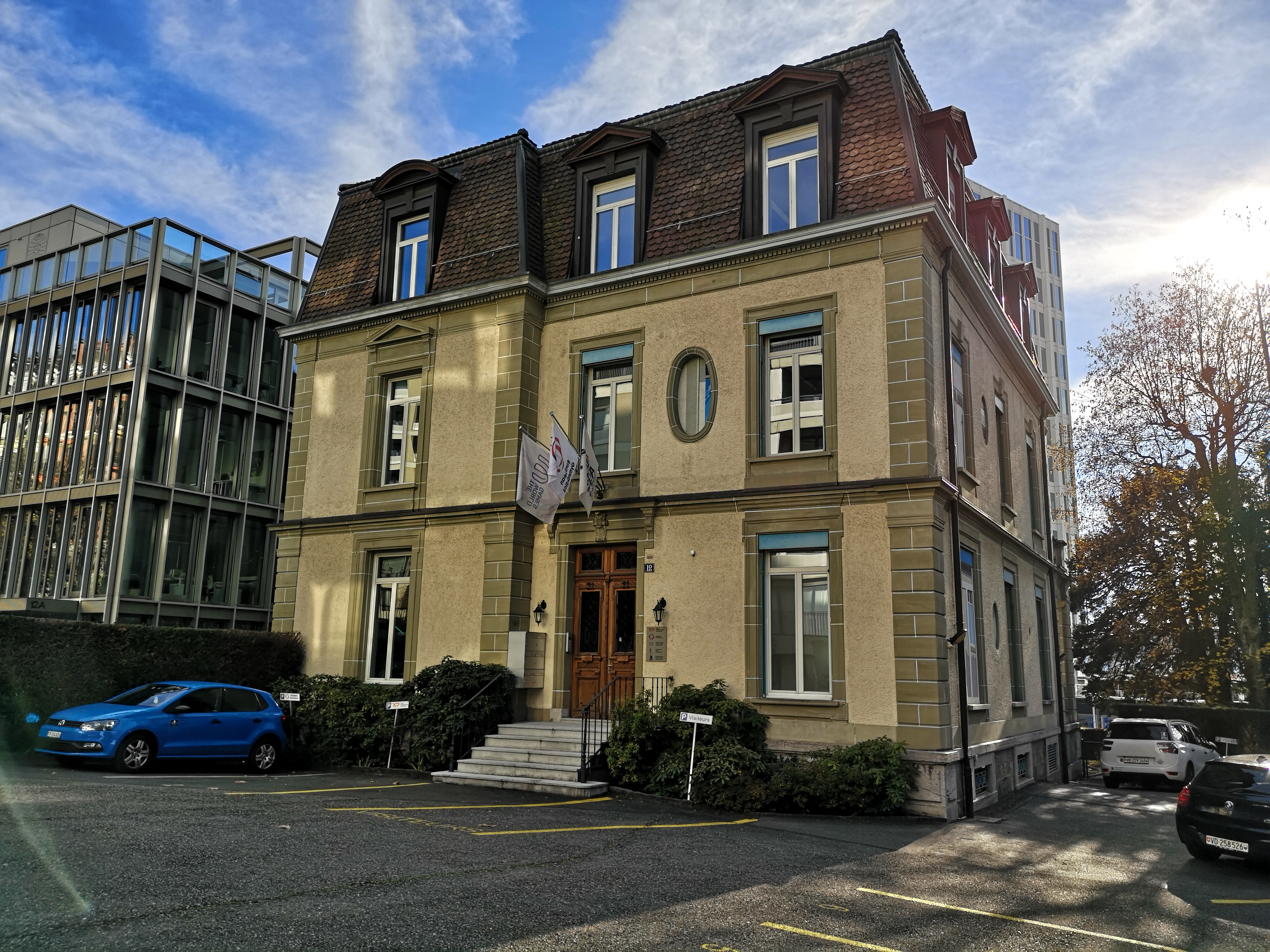
- Headquarters of European Gymnastics in Lausanne.
- Formation: 27 March 1982
- Headquarters: Lausanne
- Region served: Europe
- President: Farid Gayibov
- Website: EuropeanGymnastics.com

European Gymnastics is one of five continental unions that represents the interests of Europe in the International Gymnastics Federation (French: Fédération Internationale de Gymnastique or FIG). It was formed on 27 March 1982 as the European Union of Gymnastics (French: Union Européenne de Gymnastique or UEG) and adopted its current name on 1 April 2020.

== Events ==
European Gymnastics organises European Gymnastics Championships for each of the gymnastic disciplines.

=== Current ===
Discipline	Competition	First held	Current Frequency
Artistic gymnastics	European Men's Artistic Gymnastics Championships	1955	Annually
Artistic gymnastics	European Women's Artistic Gymnastics Championships	1957	Annually
Trampoline	European Trampoline Championships	1969	Biennially (even years)
Rhythmic gymnastics	Rhythmic Gymnastics European Championships	1978	Annually
Acrobatic gymnastics	Acrobatic Gymnastics European Championships	1978	Biennially (odd years)
TeamGym	European TeamGym Championships	1996	Biennially (even years)
Aerobic gymnastics	Aerobic Gymnastics European Championships	1999	Biennially (odd years)

=== Defunct ===
Discipline	Competition	First held	Last held
Artistic gymnastics	European Cup in Artistic Gymnastics	1988	1995
Rhythmic gymnastics	European Cup in Rhythmic Gymnastics	1989	1995
Artistic gymnastics and rhythmic gymnastics	European Team Gymnastics Championships	1997	2003

== Member federations ==
In 2015, European Gymnastics consisted of 50 member federations

Federation	Country	Year joined
Royal Belgian Gymnastics Federation	Belgium	1982
Danish Gymnastics Federation	Denmark	1982
Royal Spanish Federation of Gymnastics	Spain	1982
France Gymnastics Federation	France	1982
British Gymnastics	United Kingdom	1982
Royal Dutch Gymnastics Union	Netherlands	1982
Italian Gymnastics Federation	Italy	1982
Gymnastics Federation of Luxembourg	Luxembourg	1982
Norwegian Gymnastics Federation	Norway	1982
Gymnastics Federation of Portugal	Portugal	1982
	West Germany	1982
San Marino Gymnastic Federation	San Marino	1982
Swedish Gymnastics Federation	Sweden	1982
Swiss Gymnastics Federation	Switzerland	1982
Turkish Gymnastics Federation	Turkey	1982
Liechtenstein Gymnastics and Athletics Association	Liechtenstein	1983
	Czechoslovakia	1983
Austrian Association for Gymnastics	Austria	1984
Finnish Gymnastics Federation	Finland	1984
Hungarian Gymnastics Federation	Hungary	1984
	East Germany	1985
Bulgarian Gymnastic Federation	Bulgaria	1985
Polish Gymnastic Association	Poland	1986
Cyprus Gymnastics Federation	Cyprus	1986
Hellenic Gymnastics Federation	Greece	1986
Gymnastics Ireland	Ireland	1986
Iceland Gymnastics Federation	Iceland	1986
	Soviet Union	1986
Romanian Gymnastics Federation	Romania	1987
	Yugoslavia	1987
Andorran Gymnastics Federation	Andorra	1989
Monégasque Federation of Gymnastics	Monaco	1989
Israel Gymnastics Federation	Israel	1989
Belarus Gymnastics Association	Belarus	1992
Estonian Gymnastics Federation	Estonia	1992
Latvia Gymnastics Federation	Latvia	1992
Lithuanian Gymnastic Federation	Lithuania	1992
Russian Gymnastics Federation	Russia	1992
Ukrainian Gymnastics Federation	Ukraine	1992
Gymnastics Federation of Slovenia	Slovenia	1992
Croatian Gymnastics Federation	Croatia	1992
Albanian Gymnastics Federation	Albania	1993
Armenian Gymnastics Federation	Armenia	1993
United Gymnastics Federation of Georgia	Georgia	1993
Gymnastics Federation of Slovakia	Slovakia	1993
Czech Gymnastic Federation	Czech Republic	1993
Union of Gymnastics Federations of the Republic of Moldova	Moldova	1993
	Bosnia and Herzegovina	1995
Azerbaijan Gymnastics Federation	Azerbaijan	1996
Federation of Gymnastics Sports of Macedonia	North Macedonia	2002
Kosovo Gymnastics Association	Kosovo	2015

=== Russia and Belarus suspension ===
After the 2022 Russian invasion of Ukraine, the European Gymnastics suspended Russian athletes from participating in her competitions. At the end of November 2025, the restriction was lifted.
