= Yelena Shevchenko (gymnast) =

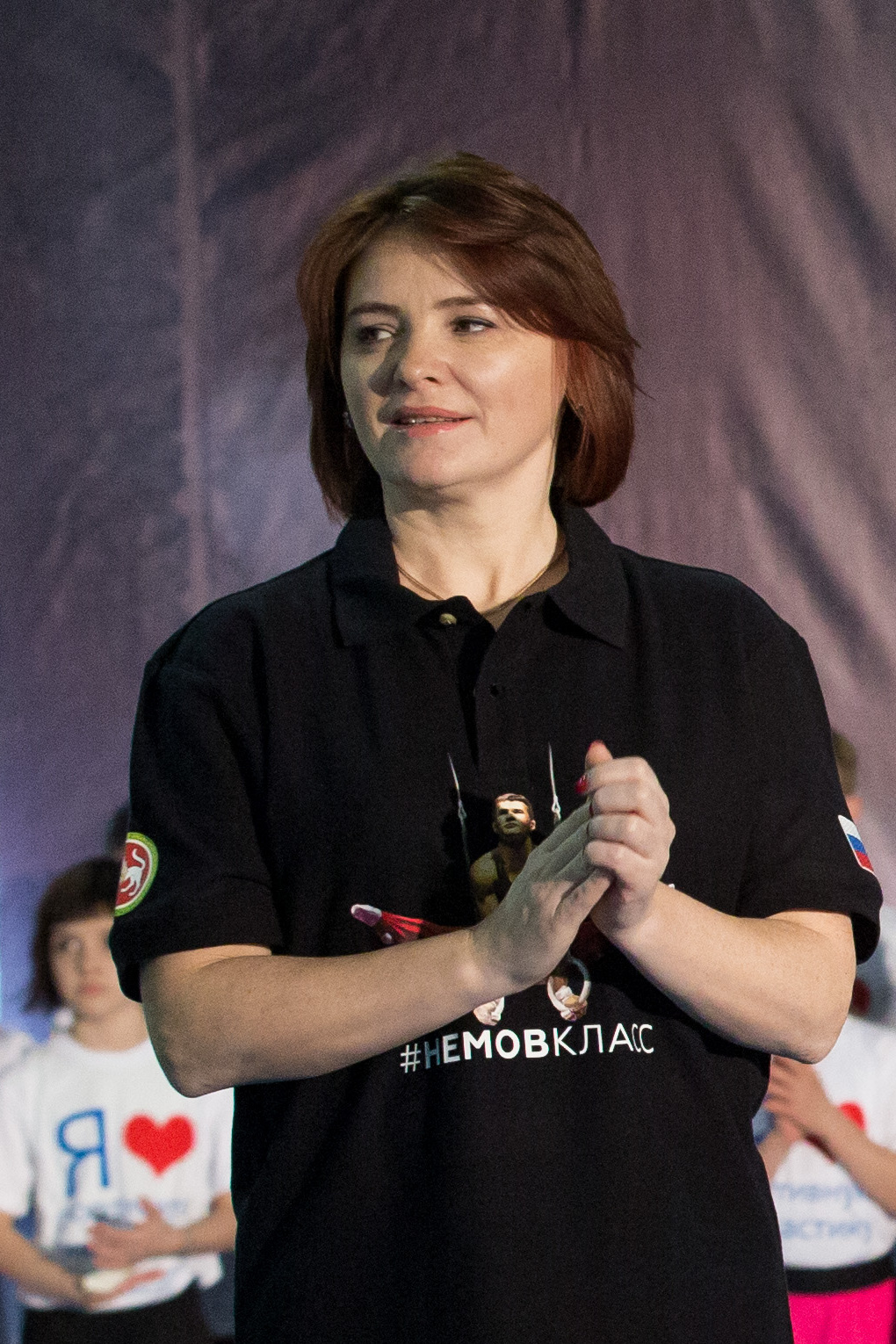

Personal information
- Born: 7 October 1971 (age 54) Moscow, Russian SFSR, Soviet Union
- Height: 1.52 m (5 ft 0 in)
- Weight: 42 kg (93 lb)

Sport
- Sport: Artistic gymnastics
- Club: CSKA Moscow
Medal record
Representing the Soviet Union
Olympic Games
Gold medal – first place	1988 Seoul	Team

Yelena Nikolayevna Shevchenko (Russian: Елена Николаевна Шевченко; born 7 October 1971) is a retired Russian gymnast. She competed at the 1988 Summer Olympics in all artistic gymnastics events and won a gold medal with the Soviet team. Individually her best achievement was ninth place in the vault.

She was included to the Olympic team owing to her strong performance at national competitions and the 1986 Goodwill Games. She missed the 1987 world championships due to injury. She retired from competitions in 1989 and since then works as a gymnastics coach and referee; in particular, she worked as a judge at the 2001 World Championships. She married speed skater Vladislav Olenin, and in 1999 gave birth to a son during a stay in England.
