= 1993 Rhythmic Gymnastics European Championships =

- Location: Bucharest, Romania
- Start date: 20 May 1993
- End date: 23 May 1993

The 1993 Rhythmic Gymnastics European Championships is the 9th edition of the Rhythmic Gymnastics European Championships, which took place from 20 May to 23 May in Bucharest, Romania. This was the first edition of united senior and junior European Championships. From now on, in even years the seniors individual competitions and junior group competitions take place and in odd years the other way around.

== Medal winners ==
Event	Gold	Silver	Bronze
Team Competition
Team	Bulgaria; Boriana Docheva; Elena Stefanova; Stella Salapatiyska	Romania; Filis Serif; Dana Carteleanu; Alina Stoica	Ukraine; Victoria Stadnik; Diana Popova; Tatiana Popova
Junior Individual
All-Around	Olga Gontar; Belarus	Yana Batyrshina; Russia	Elena Stefanova; Bulgaria
Rope	Yana Batyrshina; Russia	Olga Gontar; Belarus	Victoria Stadnik; Ukraine; Elena Stefanova; Bulgaria
Ball	Olga Gontar; Belarus	Yana Batyrshina; Russia	Victoria Stadnik; Ukraine
Clubs	Yana Batyrshina; Russia	Katia Pietrosanti; Italy; Elena Stefanova; Bulgaria	None awarded
Ribbon	Olga Gontar; Belarus	Yana Batyrshina; Russia	Eugenia Kouzkina; Russia; Victoria Stadnik; Ukraine
Senior Groups
All-Around	Russia	Bulgaria	Spain; Carolina Borrell; Alicia Martín; Cristina Martínez; Bárbara Plaza; Maider Olleta; Pilar Rodrigo
6 Ropes	Russia	Bulgaria	Hungary; Romania
4 Hoops + 4 Clubs	Bulgaria; Russia	None awarded	Spain; Carolina Borrell; Alicia Martín; Cristina Martínez; Bárbara Plaza; Maider Olleta; Pilar Rodrigo

== Medal table ==
Rank	Nation	Gold	Silver	Bronze	Total
1	Russia (RUS)	5	3	1	9
2	Belarus (BLR)	3	1	0	4
3	Bulgaria (BUL)	2	3	2	7
4	Romania (ROU)	0	1	1	2
5	Italy (ITA)	0	1	0	1
6	Ukraine (UKR)	0	0	4	4
7	Spain (ESP)	0	0	2	2
8	Hungary (HUN)	0	0	1	1
Totals (8 entries)		10	9	11	30
