= Mila Marinova =

Bulgarian rhythmic gymnast (born 1974)

- Мила Маринова
- Born: 3 June 1974 (age 52) Sofia

Gymnastics career
- Discipline: Rhythmic gymnastics
- Country represented: Bulgaria
- Club: Slavia
- Retired: yes
Medal record
Representing Bulgaria
World Championships
Silver medal – second place	1991 Athens	Hoop
Silver medal – second place	1991 Athens	Clubs
Silver medal – second place	1991 Athens	Team
Bronze medal – third place	1991 Athens	All-around
Bronze medal – third place	1991 Athens	Ball
European Cup Final
Gold medal – first place	1991 Brussels	Hoop
Gold medal – first place	1991 Brussels	Ball
Silver medal – second place	1991 Brussels	Rope
Bronze medal – third place	1991 Brussels	All-around
Goodwill Games
Gold medal – first place	1990 Seattle	Hoop
Silver medal – second place	1990 Seattle	All-around
Silver medal – second place	1990 Seattle	Rope
Silver medal – second place	1990 Seattle	Ribbon
Silver medal – second place	1990 Seattle	Ball

Mila Marinova Picus, née Marinova (Bulgarian: Мила Маринова; born 3 June 1974) is a Bulgarian rhythmic gymnast who later competed domestically in the United States and now works as a coach. She is the 1991 World bronze all-around medalist and a Bulgarian national champion.

== Biography ==
Marinova was born in Sofia, Bulgaria. She trained in both the Slavia and Levski clubs during her career.

As a junior, Marinova competed at the 1989 Junior European Championships, where she won silver in the all-around as well as gold in three of the four apparatus finals. That year, she was also the national junior champion.

The next year, she won the Bulgarian senior title. She competed at the 1990 World Cup, where she won silver in the all-around. She won three more medals in the event finals, a gold with ribbon, silver with hoop, and bronze with ball.

At the 1990 Goodwill Games, she won the silver medal in all-around as well as in three of the event finals - all but hoop, where she won gold.

In June 1991, she competed at the European Cup Final, where she won bronze in the all-around behind Alexandra Timoshenko and Oksana Skaldina. In the apparatus finals, she won gold with hoop and ball and silver with rope. That October, she represented Bulgaria at the World Championships, where she again won bronze in the all-around behind Skaldina and Timoshenko. She won a further two silvers in the apparatus finals, hoop and clubs, and a bronze with ball. With her teammates Maria Petrova and Kristina Shikerova, she also won silver in the team event.

After her retirement, she moved to Jacksonville, Florida in the United States with her coach and began coaching alongside her. She married in 1995, and she had a son in 1998. Marinova began to train again in 1998. Speaking about her comeback, she said "I have a lot more fun than I did before" and that she thought that older gymnasts were better than younger ones because they were able to show more artistry.

She competed domestically and spent two years on the US national team. In 1999, she was fourth at the national championships. The next year, she was third, but she withdrew from the apparatus finals, citing exhaustion. She resumed coaching after her second retirement and now works at Florida Elite Gymnastics.
