= Ksenia Dzhalaganiya =

Russian group rhythmic gymnast

- Alternative name: Ксения Джалагания
- Born: July 7, 1985 (age 41) Moscow, Russian SFSR, Soviet Union
- Height: 178 cm (5 ft 10 in)

Gymnastics career
- Discipline: Rhythmic gymnastics
- Country represented: Russia
- Gym: Novogorsk
- Head coach: Irina Viner
- Assistant coach: Oxana Skaldina
- Retired: 2003
Medal record
Representing Russia
Group Rhythmic Gymnastics
World Championships
Gold medal – first place	2002 New Orleans	Group
European Championships
Gold medal – first place	1999 Budapest	Group

Ksenia Dzhalaganiya (Russian: Ксения Николаевна Джалагания, born 7 July 1985) is a Russian group rhythmic gymnast, who is now the founder and director of Dubai Youth Olympic school of rhythmic gymnastics in the United Arab Emirates.

She is a World champion in group exercises (2002), a European champion in group exercises (1999), Honoured Master of Sports in rhythmic gymnastics, and winner of several international championships and Grand Prix events.

== Personal life ==
Ksenia Dzhalaganiya was born to Tatiana and Nikolay Dzhalaganiya in Moscow. In 2004, she graduated from the Aspect College in London and in 2008 she graduated from the Russian State University of Physical Culture, Sport, Youth and Tourism.

In September 2015 Ksenia married her fiancé, the Group Chief Executive Officer (CEO) of Cockett Marine Oil - Cem Saral. They met in Singapore in 2010 where Ksenia was coaching a junior national team of rhythmic gymnastics and three years later both moved to Dubai.

== Gymnastics career ==
Dzhalaganiya started rhythmic gymnastics at the age of five. In 1993, she won her first gold medal t the Grand Prix in Germany.

In 1997, Dzhalaganiya began training with A.N. Janina and Oxana Skaldina. In 1998, she became a member of the Russian Junior team of rhythmic gymnastics. In 1999 she won the European Junior Gymnastics Championships in Budapest.

Dzhalaganiya was a member of the Russian Olympic team in rhythmic gymnastics from 2000 to 2003. In 2002 as a member of the Russian team in the group exercises she won gold medals and became an absolute World Champion. After returning to Russia, Dzhalaganiya took part in a press conference devoted to the championship (along with the other winners). In the same year Dzhalaganiya was awarded the title of Honoured Master of Sports of Russia and completed her secondary education at the Moscow School of Olympic Reserve.

In 2003 Dzhalaganiya ended her sports career and moved on to coaching. In 2010, she became a coach of Singapore Junior national team of rhythmic gymnastics. While preparing young gymnasts for the Youth Olympic Games in 2014. Dzhalaganiya accompanied her team to many International competitions.

== Coaching career ==
After retiring from professional sport, Dzhalaganiya continued her gymnastics career as a coach. In 2010, she signed a contract with Singapore Gymnastics Federation and led a Singapore junior national team of rhythmic gymnastics.

In 2015 Dzhalaganiya opened Dubai Youth Olympic school of rhythmic gymnastics.
