= Zhang Xia =

Chinese gymnast

Personal information
- Nationality: Chinese
- Born: 21 June 1975 (age 51) Xintai, Shandong, China

Sport
- Sport: Gymnastics
Medal record
Representing China
Goodwill Games
Gold medal – first place	1990 Seattle	Uneven Bars
Bronze medal – third place	1990 Seattle	Team

Zhang Xia (born 21 June 1975) is a Chinese gymnast. She competed in six events at the 1992 Summer Olympics. At the 1990 Goodwill games in Seattle, she won the gold medal on uneven bars along with a bronze medal with her team.
