= Ada Liberio =

Spanish rhythmic gymnast

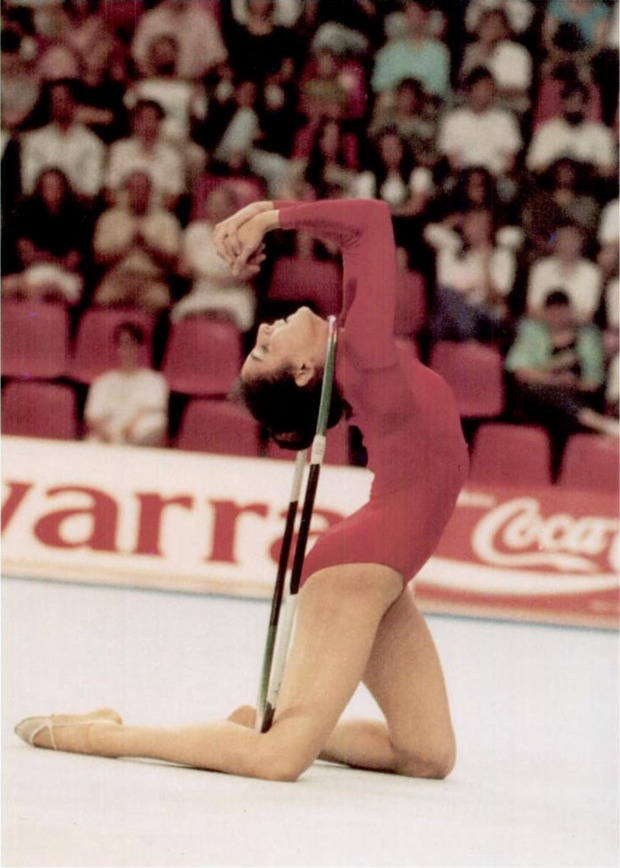

Personal information
- Full name: Ada Liberio Romo
- Born: 10 August 1974 (age 52) Zaragoza, Spain

Gymnastics career
- Discipline: Rhythmic gymnastics
- Country represented: Spain (1986-1991)
- Club: Club Deportivo Zaragozano de Gimnasia
- Head coach: Emilia Boneva
- Retired: yes
Medal record
Event	1st	2nd	3rd
Junior European Championships	0	1	1
World Championships	0	0	1
Total	0	1	2
Rhythmic Gymnastics
Representing Spain
World Championships
Bronze medal – third place	1989 Sarajevo	Team
Junior European Championships
Silver medal – second place	1989 Tenerife	Clubs
Bronze medal – third place	1989 Tenerife	Team

Ada Liberio Romo (born 10 August 1974) is a retired Spanish rhythmic gymnast. She is a European and world medalist.

== Biography ==
She trained at the Zaragozano Gimnasia Sports Club, being trained by Cathy Xaudaró. Along with other gymnasts such as Ana Bolea or the sisters Elmira and Cristina Dassaeva, she made the club become one of the leading teams in rhythmic gymnastics at the regional level for several decades.

In 1984, she ranked fourth in the children's category and won the silver medal in rope and the bronze medal in freehands and hoop at the Spanish Championships. In 1985 she was champion of Aragon in children and runner-up at nationals. Becoming champion of Aragon in children again in 1986 and winning bronze in that same category in the Spanish Championships.

In 1986 she was invited to join the national team by Emilia Boneva. The same year she competed in the tournament Cerceu D'Or in Bulgaria, finishing 11th.

As a junior in the Spanish team, she participated in the first Junior European Championships in 1987, held in Athens, where he placed 15th overall and 7th in the ribbon final. That same year she was the Spanish champion in the second category, also getting gold in ball, hoop and ribbon's finals. In the 1988 Spanish Championships, held in Lloret de Mar, she was champion in the first category both in the All-Around and with ball, and that same year she was champion of Aragon.

In June 1989, at the Junior European Championships in Tenerife, she took 5th place in the general classification and won team bronze together with Rosabel Espinosa and Edi Moreno. In the apparatus finals she was fifth with ball, and fourth with hoop and rope, she also obtained silver with clubs. She then moved to the senior category, becoming once again Spanish champion in Murcia in the first category, obtaining the gold medal in all the finals. Selected for the World Championships in Sarajevo, she was 12th in the All-Around, 8th in the hoop final and also won the team bronze medal along Ana Bautista and Silvia Yustos. In the Ibero-American Games she was first in the All-Around and won the gold medal in ball and hoop.

In 1990, in the VI City of Barcelona International Cup, she won gold in the All-Around and with ball, silver with ribbon and bronze with hoop. In addition, she was proclaimed Spanish champion in the honor category, ahead of Noelia Fernández and Mónica Ferrández, in Guadalajara. Then she placed 5th in the world ranking during the qualification tournaments for the World Cup, but she had an injury in which she fractured her foot and could not participate in the final competition. At the Goodwill Games in Seattle she took 6th place in the All-Around, 5th with rope, hoop and ball, and 7th with ribbon.

In 1990 the Royal Spanish Gymnastics Federation awarded him the Medal of Gymnastic Merit. In July 1991 she made the decision to retire.

After Boneva's death on 20 September 2019, Ada and other former national gymnasts gathered to pay tribute to her during the Euskalgym held on 16 November 2019. The event took place before 8,500 attendees at the Bilbao Exhibition Center de Baracaldo and was followed by a dinner in Boneva's honor.
