= Mat (gymnastics) =

Safety pad put on the floor

Mats are used for safety in gymnastics, and in training new skills. They are usually a piece of foam (covered in leather) ranging from 1.5 to 28 inches thick, covered in a vinyl or plastic lining. The foam ranges in density from relatively firm to very soft.

Landing mats are usually blue but can be almost any other color. They come in various sizes, from tiny mats used on the beam to vast mats used in the foam pits.

Typically, mat use is mandatory in both competition and practice. On every event except floor exercise, pommel horse, and vault, gymnasts may use an additional landing mat without deduction, which may be adjusted for distance.

== Types ==
=== Beam pads ===
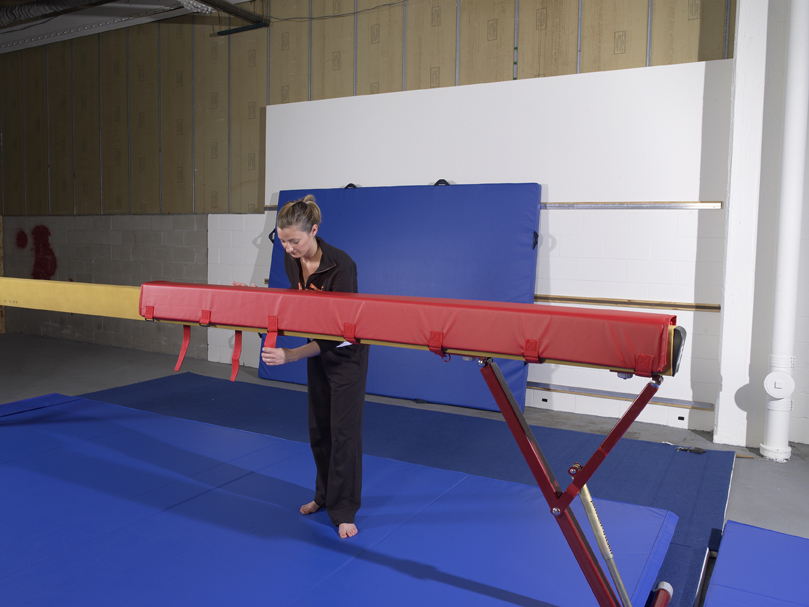
This gymnastics coach is fastening a foam beam wrap to the balance beam.

These thin mats fasten around the balance beam. They are used only in high-level training to give gymnasts additional protection and a more expansive landing space while working on the apparatus. If necessary, makeshift beam pads can also be constructed from soft mats over the beam surface.

=== Blocks ===
Blocks are firm, trapezoid or rectangular-shaped mats. They can be attached to other blocks via velcro and straps. Blocks are routinely used as step-stools for gymnasts working on the bars or beam and as practice vaulting surfaces.

=== Crash mats ===
These extremely thick, soft mats are typically used when an athlete learns a new, high-impact skill.

=== Folding panel mats ===
These mats are thin, firm mats about twelve feet in length. They usually have alternating color panels and can be folded, stacked, and attached to other mats via velcro strips at the ends. Generally used for practicing tumbling moves, these mats may be stacked to provide a protective surface for gymnasts working on the low balance beam or provide a means for a gymnast to reach the bars or rings. They have a history of usage in gymnastics, martial arts, and physical education classes. Schools generally purchase new folding mats once every seven years. These mats protect the body from high-impact collisions with hard, solid surfaces such as hardwood or concrete flooring. There are two main categories of foam used in these types of mats: cross-linked polyethylene foam and polyurethane foam.

==== Foam core ====
===== Polyethylene foam =====
Cross-linked polyethylene foam is very solid and sturdy. When used in a folding panel gym mat, it is generally accepted to be at a standard thickness of 1 3/8". Mats with this type of foam would be considered for professional use in sporting events.

===== Polyurethane foam =====
The foam is firm, but not as firm as the cross-linked polyethylene foam used in 1 3/8" thick models. Because of the lack of firmness, mats made with this type of foam generally use specifically 2" thick 100 ILD open cell 4.5 lb. density polyurethane foam. Generally accepted uses of mats with this kind of foam are practice venues, home use, and youth amateur sports events.

==== Vinyls ====
Although each mat may be made of different foam, they generally have similar vinyl enclosures. 14- to 18-ounce polyester laminated vinyl is usually used in all folding mat applications. The vinyl covers should be fire-retardant (class A), puncture and mildew-resistant, and antibacterial to help maintain good hygiene. Velcro on each end of the mat allows a near-seamless connection to additional mats for tumbling runs or expansive areas.

==== Sizes ====
Ranging from 4 feet x 8 feet to 6 feet x 12 feet, sizes usually only matter when limited by space or personal preference. In most cases – like in gymnastics – multiple mats are purchased to be strung together via velcro to create the ultimate sure-footed tumbling experience. Generally, mats used for gymnasiums and gymnastics mats come in 2-foot-wide panels, which is why many in the industry call them folding panel mats or folding mats. The 2-foot-wide panels allow for ease in both setup and clean up when using the mats to become the perfect compact size for storage.

=== Incline mats ===
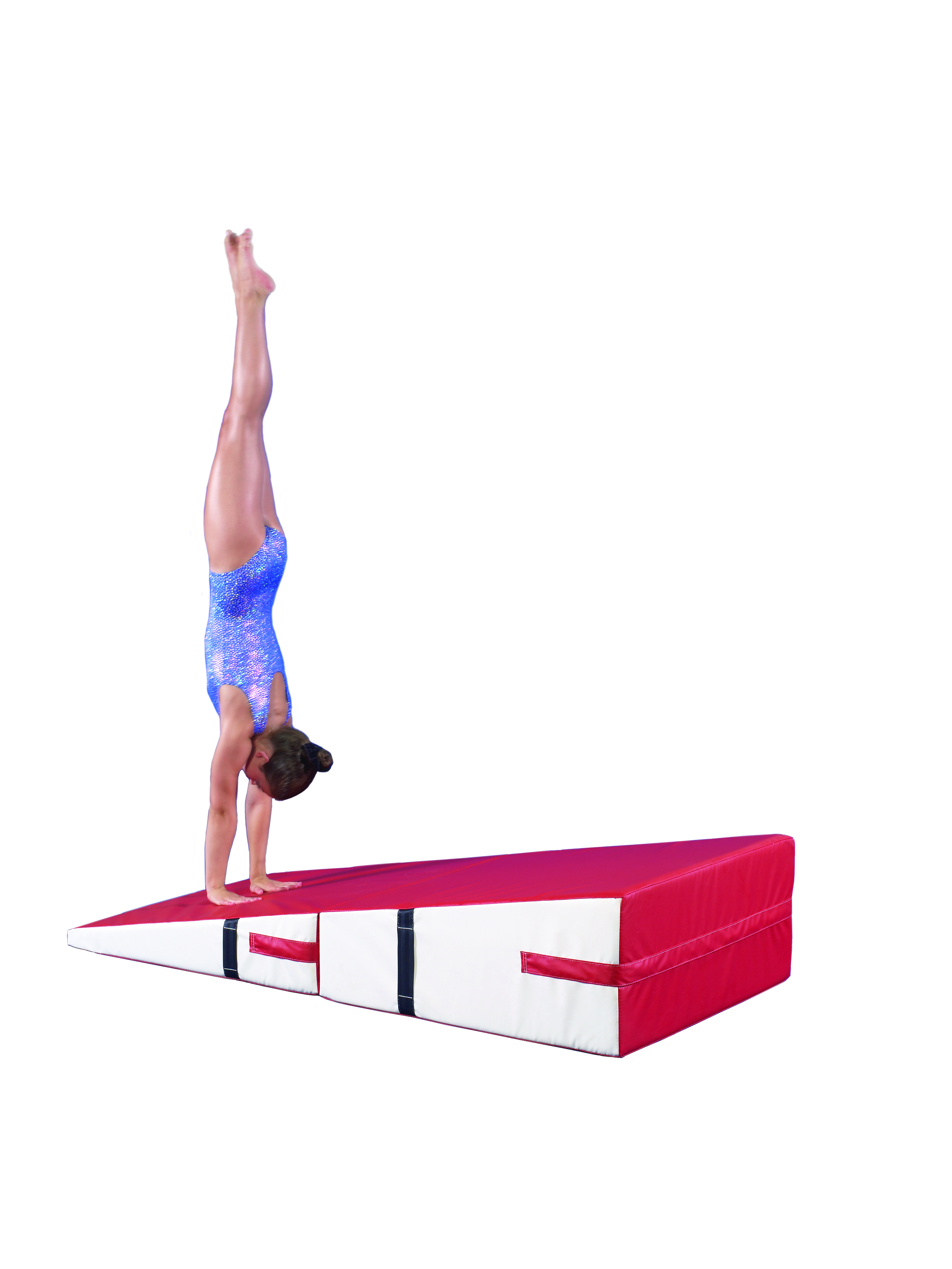
This gymnast performs a handstand on a folding incline.

Incline mats, also known as wedge mats, cheese mats, or simply "the cheese", are firm mats shaped like right triangles. They are mainly used to teach and train beginning and intermediate gymnastics skills such as rolls, walkovers, and handsprings.

=== Springboard mats ===
These firm mats are used on vault. They are U-shaped and surround the springboard on three sides. If the gymnast's foot misses the springboard during their vault attempt, they can push off the mat for momentum and, hopefully, avoid a serious injury. Under the current Code of Points, performing a Yurchenko-style vault without the safety mat results in an automatic score of zero.

=== Landing mats ===
These mats are thin and soft, usually white or red, to distinguish them from the other mats and floor exercise area. They are used on the floor exercise to lessen the "sting," or impact, of tumbling run landings and for dismounts on the beam or floor. Sting mats are routinely used in training but rarely permitted in competition.
