= Carolina Borrell =

Spanish rhythmic gymnast

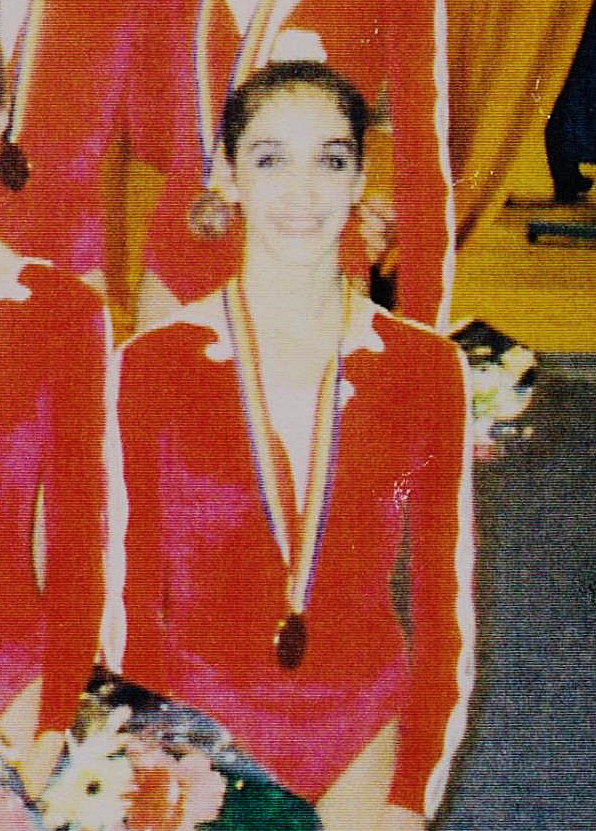

Personal information
- Full name: Carolina Borrell Penades
- Born: Murcia, Spain

Gymnastics career
- Discipline: Rhythmic gymnastics
- Country represented: Spain (1991-1993)
- Club: Escuela de Competición
- Retired: yes
Medal record
Rhythmic Gymnastics
Representing Spain
Junior European Championships
Bronze medal – third place	1991 Lisbon	Team
Bronze medal – third place	1991 Lisbon	Clubs
European Championships
Bronze medal – third place	1993 Bucharest	All-Around
Bronze medal – third place	1993 Bucharest	4 Hoops + 4 Clubs

Carolina Borrell Penades is a former Spanish rhythmic gymnast who competed in the Spanish national rhythmic gymnastics team. As an individual, she achieved bronze both in teams and in clubs at the 1991 European Junior Championships in Lisbon, while with the group she won bronze in both in the All-Around and with 4 hoops + 4 clubs at the 1993 European Championships in Bucharest.

== Career ==
Borrell trained as a rhythmic gymnast at the Escuela de Competición of Murcia.

In 1991, she entered the national team as a junior individual gymnast, participating in the European Junior Championships in Lisbon, where she won the bronze medal in the team category together with Rosabel Espinosa, Bárbara Plaza and substitute Peligros Piñero, as well as the bronze medal in the clubs final. That same year she won the bronze medal in the honor category at the Spanish Championship, held in Torrevieja, where she finished behind Carolina Pascual and Mónica Ferrández.

In 1993 she became part of the senior national team. That year Ana Roncero became the national team manager and María Fernández Ostolaza joined the team as coach. The renewed starting group for that year was made up of Carolina, Alicia Martín, Cristina Martínez, Maider Olleta, Bárbara Plaza and Pilar Rodrigo, with María Álvarez and Regina Guati as substitutes. Lorena Barbadillo, Paula Cabo and Eva Velasco were also in the group. In the European Championship in Bucharest, the Spanish group won the bronze medal in the All-Around and in the 4 hoops + 4 clubs' final, and the 6th place with 6 ropes. She retired after this championship.

== Routine music information ==
Year	Apparatus	Music Title
1990	Ball	Adagio in G minor by Remo Giazotto.
1990	Rope	Smooth Criminal by Michael Jackson.
1990	Ribbon	
1991	Ball	Unchained Melody by Alex North and Hy Zaret
1991	Clubs	Piano Sonata No. 14 by Ludwig van Beethoven.
1991	Hoop	
1992	Ball	unknown song by Ludwig van Beethoven
1992	Clubs	Verano porteño by Astor Piazzolla.
1992	Rope	Asturias (Leyenda) from Suite española, Op. 47 by Isaac Albéniz
