= Eva Rueda =

Spanish artistic gymnast (born 1971)

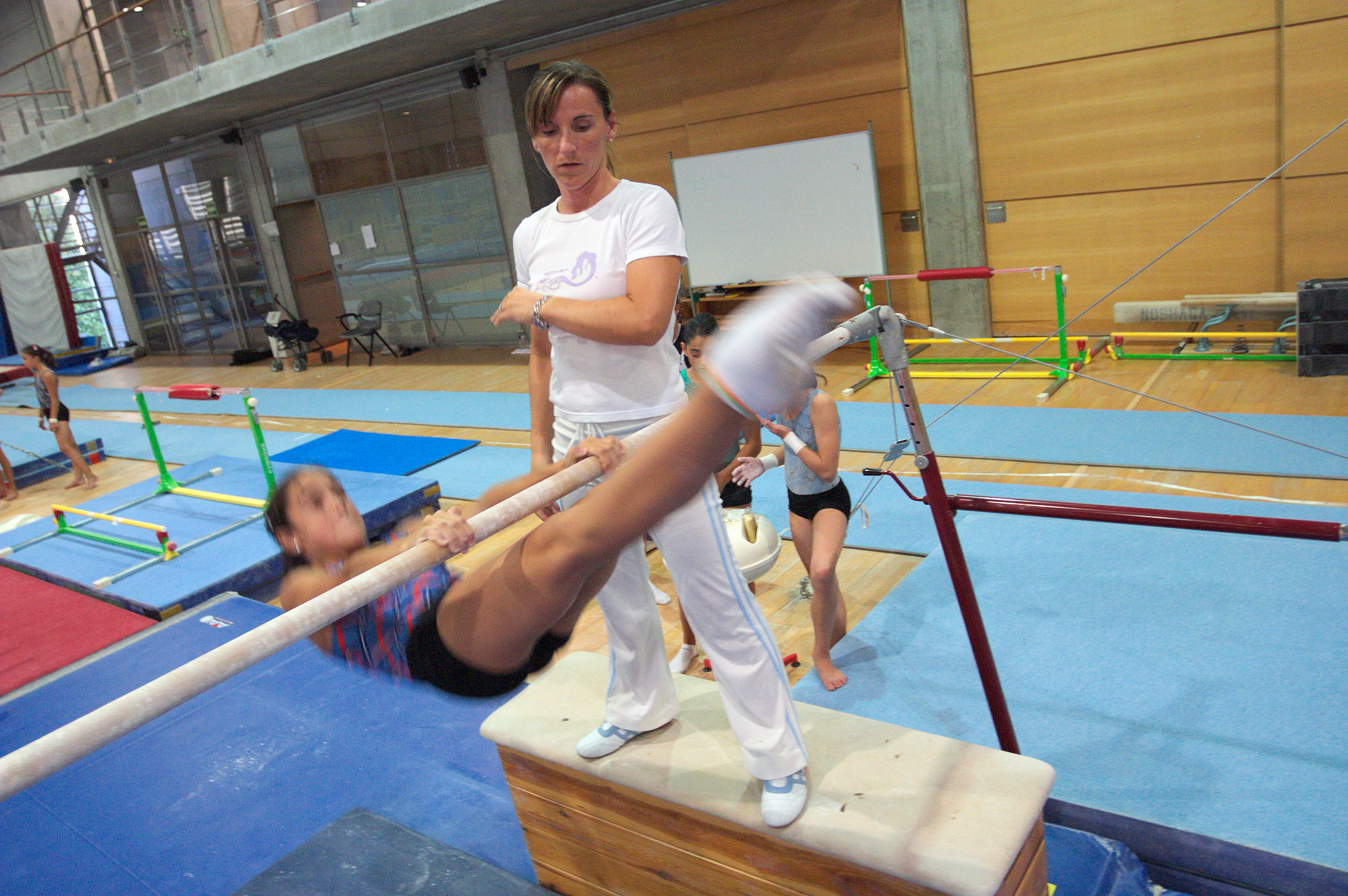

Personal information
- Nationality: Spanish
- Born: 13 September 1971 (age 54) Madrid, Spain

Sport
- Sport: Artistic gymnastics

Eva Rueda (born 13 September 1971) is a Spanish artistic gymnast, born in Madrid. She competed at the 1988 Summer Olympics and the 1992 Summer Olympics.

== Eponymous skill ==
Rueda has one eponymous balance beam skill listed in the Code of Points.

Apparatus	Name	Description	Difficulty (Note: Valid for the 2025–2028 Code of Points)
Balance beam	Rueda	All flic-flac variations with piking and stretching of hips in flight phase with swing down to cross straddle sit	C (0.3)
