= European TeamGym Championships =

Gymnastics competition

The European TeamGym Championships is a competitions organized by the European Union of Gymnastics in the sport of TeamGym.

== Results ==
			Men			Women			Mixed		
Year	Ed.	Host	Gold	Silver	Bronze	Gold	Silver	Bronze	Gold	Silver	Bronze
1996	I	(Finland) Jyväskylä	Sweden	Denmark	Sweden	Sweden	Estonia	Germany	Denmark	Finland	Sweden
1998	II	(Denmark) Odense	Denmark	Sweden	Denmark	Germany	Sweden	Finland	Czech Republic	Denmark	Czech Republic
2000	III	(United Kingdom) Birmingham	Denmark	Denmark	Sweden	Denmark	Denmark	Germany	Denmark	Sweden	Denmark
2002	IV	(France) Châlons-en-Champagne	Denmark	Sweden	Denmark	Denmark	Sweden	Sweden	Denmark	Sweden	Denmark
2004	V	(Austria) Dornbirn	Denmark	Sweden	Norway	Norway	Sweden	Denmark	Denmark	Sweden	Norway
2006	VI	(Czech Republic) Ostrava	Denmark	Denmark	Sweden	Sweden	Iceland	Denmark	Denmark	Sweden	Denmark
2008	VII	(Belgium) Ghent	Denmark	Denmark	Sweden	Sweden	Iceland	Denmark	Denmark	Norway	Sweden
2010	VIII	(Sweden) Malmö	Denmark	Sweden	Norway	Iceland	Sweden	Norway	Norway	Sweden	Denmark
2012	IX	(Denmark) Aarhus	Denmark	Sweden	Norway	Iceland	Sweden	Finland	Denmark	Norway	Sweden
2014	X	(Iceland) Reykjavík	Denmark	Sweden	Norway	Sweden	Iceland	Denmark	Denmark	Norway	Sweden
2016	XI	(Slovenia) Maribor	Denmark	Sweden	Norway	Sweden	Iceland	Denmark	Sweden	Denmark	Iceland
2018	XII	(Portugal) Lisbon	Denmark	Sweden	Norway	Sweden	Iceland	Denmark	Sweden	Denmark	Iceland
2020	XIII	(Portugal) Guimarães	Sweden	Iceland	Great Britain	Iceland	Sweden	Finland	Sweden	Great Britain	Italy
2022	XIV	(Luxembourg) Luxemburg	Denmark	Norway	Sweden	Sweden	Iceland	Denmark	Great Britain	Denmark	Sweden
