= Matt (name) =

Matt or Mat is a male given name, often used as a nickname for Matthew. Less commonly, it is used as a surname.

== Given name ==
=== Athletes ===
- Matt Acton (born 1992), Australian association football player
- Matt Adams (born 1998), American baseball player
- Matt Ammendola (born 1996), American football player
- Matt Araiza (born 2000), American football player
- Matt Asiata (born 1987), American football player
- Matt Bahr (born 1956), American football player
- Matt Ballin (born 1984), Australian rugby league player
- Matt Barnes (disambiguation), multiple people
- Matt Beaty (born 1993), American baseball player
- Matt Bentley (born 1979), American professional wrestler
- Matt Besler (born 1987), American footballer
- Matt Bessette (born 1984), American mixed martial artist
- Matt Biondi (born 1965), American swimmer
- Matt Birk (born 1976), American football player
- Matt Blake (born 1985), American baseball coach
- Matt Blair, (1950–2020), American football player
- Matt Borgschulte (born 1990), American baseball coach
- Matt Bradley (ice hockey) (born 1978), Canadian ice hockey player
- Matt Bradley (American football) (1960–2002), American football player
- Matt Brash (disambiguation), multiple people
- Matt Bryant (born 1975), American football player
- Matt Brennan (American football) (1897–1963), American football player
- Matt Bullard (born 1967), former basketball player
- Matt Burke (rugby union, born 1973), Australian rugby union player
- Matt Buschmann (born 1984), American baseball player and coach
- Matt Bush (disambiguation), multiple people
- Matt Bushman (born 1995), American football player
- Matt Cain (born 1984), American baseball player
- Matt Carpenter (baseball) (born 1985), American baseball player
- Matt Carroll (basketball) (born 1980), American basketball player
- Matt Cassel (born 1982), American football player
- Matt Cavanaugh (born 1956), American football player
- Matt Chapman (born 1993), American baseball player
- Matt Coates (born 1991), Canadian football player
- Matt Cole (born 1996), American football player
- Matt Coleman III (born 1998), American basketball player for Hapoel Haifa of the Israeli Basketball Premier League
- Matt Cook (ice sledge hockey) (1987–2010), Canadian ice sledge hockey player
- Matt Cook (rugby league) (born 1986), English rugby union and rugby league footballer
- Matt Cooke (born 1978), Canadian ice hockey player
- Matt Corral (born 1999), American football player
- Matt Crafton (born 1976), American racecar driver
- Matt Davidson (baseball) (born 1991), American baseball player
- Mat Dawson (born 1972), English retired rugby union player
- Matt Dermody (born 1990), American baseball player
- Matt DiBenedetto (born 1991), American race car driver
- Matt Dickerson (born 1995), American football player
- Matt Duchene (born 1991), Canadian hockey player
- Matt Duffie (born 1990), New Zealand rugby union footballer
- Matt Duffy (born 1991), American baseball player
- Matt Duffy (baseball, born 1989), American baseball player
- Matt Dunigan (born 1960), Canadian Football league
- Matt Elliott (footballer) (born 1968), Scottish footballer
- Matt Entz (born 1972), American football coach
- Matt Erickson (born 1975), American baseball player and coach
- Matt Evans (rugby union) (born 1988), Canadian rugby union player
- Matt Farniok (born 1997), American football player
- Matt Feiler (born 1992), American football player
- Matt Fish (born 1969), basketball player
- Matt Flanagan (American football) (born 1995), American football player
- Matt Flynn (born 1985), American football player
- Matt Forte (born 1985), American football player
- Matt Foster (born 1995), American baseball player
- Matt Gage (born 1993), American baseball player
- Matt Garstka (born 1989), American drummer
- Matt Garza (born 1983), American baseball player
- Matt Gay (born 1994), American football player
- Matt Gillett (born 1988), Australian rugby league player
- Matt Giteau (born 1982), Australian rugby union footballer
- Matt Goncalves (born 2001), American football player
- Matt Gono (born 1996), American football player
- Matt Gulbin (born 2002), American football player
- Matt Hamilton (curler) (born 1989), American curler
- Matt Hanousek (born 1963), American football player
- Matt Hardy (born 1974), American professional wrestler
- Matt Harvey (born 1989), American baseball player
- Matt Hasselbeck (born 1975), American football player
- Matt Hayden (born 1971), professional cricketer
- Matt Hazeltine (1933–1987), American football player
- Matt Hedges (born 1990), American footballer
- Matt Hennessy (born 1997), American football player
- Matt Henningsen (born 1999), American football player
- Matt Hernandez (born 1961), American football player
- Mat Hoffman (born 1972), American BMX rider
- Matt Holland (born 1974), footballer
- Matt Holliday (born 1980), American baseball player
- Matt Hughes (fighter) (born 1973), American mixed martial artist
- Matt Jones (basketball) (born 1994), American basketball player
- Matt Jones (Australian footballer) (born 1987), Australian rules footballer
- Matt Jones (footballer, born 1980), Welsh international football player
- Matt Jones (footballer, born 1986), English football goalkeeper for Belenenses
- Matt Jones (golfer) (born 1980), Australian professional golfer
- Matt Jones (ice hockey) (born 1983), American ice hockey defenseman
- Matt Jones (rugby union) (born 1984), Welsh international rugby union player
- Matt Jones (running back) (born 1993), American football running back
- Matt Jones (wide receiver) (born 1983), American football wide receiver
- Matt Kalil (born 1989), American football
- Matt Kaskey (born 1997), American football player
- Matt Kemp (born 1984), American baseball player
- Matt Kenseth (born 1972), American racing driver and 2003 NASCAR Winston Cup Champion
- Matt Kilroy (1866–1940), American baseball player
- Matt Koch (born 1990), American baseball player
- Matt Kohn (born 1981), American football player
- Matt Krook (born 1994), American baseball player
- Matt LaFleur (born 1979), American football coach
- Matt Landers (born 1999), American football player
- Mat Latos (born 1987), American Major League Baseball pitcher
- Matt Lauter (born 2002), American football player
- Matt Lee, Canadian professional wrestler, better known as Shane Matthews
- Matt Leinart (born 1983), American football player
- Matt Leo (born 1992), Australian-American football player
- Matt Lentz (born 1982), American football player
- Matt Lesperance (born 1987), American wheelchair basketball player
- Matt Le Tissier (born 1968), former English International association football player
- Matt Light, (born 1978), American football
- Matt Lloyd (footballer) (born 1965), Australian rules footballer
- Matt Lloyd (Paralympian) (born 1972), British ice sledge hockey Paralympian
- Matt Manning (born 1998), American baseball player
- Matt Manning (rugby league) (born 1974), Australian rugby league footballer
- Matt McCrane (born 1994), American football player
- Matt McGloin (born 1989), American football player
- Mat Mendenhall (born 1957), American former National Football League player
- Matt Mervis (born 1998), American baseball player
- Matt Milano (born 1994), American football player
- Matt Millen (born 1958), American Football player
- Matt Moore (disambiguation), several people
- Matt Morgan (wrestler) (born 1976), American professional wrestler
- Matt Morris (baseball) (born 1974), retired baseball player
- Matt Moylan (born 1991), Australian rugby league player
- Matt Mullins, American martial artist
- Matt Murray (ice hockey, born 1994), Canadian Ice Hockey
- Matt Nable (born 1972), Australian rugby league footballer and actor
- Matt Nagy (born 1978), American football player
- Matt Neal (born 1966) a British touring car driver
- Matt O'Riley (born 2000), English-Danish football player
- Matt Olson (born 1994), American baseball player
- Matt Orzech (born 1995), American football player
- Matt Osborne (1957–2013), professional wrestler
- Matt Patricia (born 1974), American football coach
- Matt Peacock (disambiguation), multiple people
- Matt Peart (born 1997), Jamaican-American football player
- Matt Perry (rugby union) (born 1977), English rugby union footballer
- Matt Postle (born 1970), Welsh racing cyclist
- Matt Prater (born 1984), American football player
- Matt Prince (born 1973), a.k.a. Wifebeater, American professional wrestler
- Matt Pryor (American football) (born 1994), American football player
- Matt Pushard (born 1997), American baseball player
- Matt Quatraro (born 1973), American baseball coach
- Mat Rebeaud (born 1982), Swiss freestyle motocross rider
- Matt Reiswerg (born 1980), American soccer player, coach, and administrator
- Matt Reynolds (American football) (born 1986), American football player
- Matt Reynolds (baseball coach), American college baseball coach
- Matt Reynolds (infielder) (born 1990), American baseball player
- Matt Reynolds (pitcher) (born 1984), American baseball player
- Matt Rhule (born 1975), American football coach
- Mat Robinson (born 1986), Canadian ice hockey player
- Matt Robinson (American football) (born 1956), American football player
- Matt Robinson (footballer, born 1907) (1907–1987), English football player
- Matt Robinson (footballer, born 1993), English football player
- Matt Robinson (rugby league) (born 1990), New Zealand rugby league player
- Mat Rogers (born 1976), Australian former rugby league footballer
- Matt Ruff (born 1990), Football player
- Matt Ryan (American football) (born 1985), American football player
- Matt Scoggin (born 1963), American diver
- Matt Schaub (born 1981), American football player
- Matt Simms (American football) (born 1988), American football player
- Matt Snell (born 1941), American football player
- Matt Sokol (born 1995), American football player
- Matt Stairs (born 1968), baseball player
- Matt Stajan (born 1983), ice hockey player
- Matt Stover (born 1968), American former football player
- Matt Strahm (born 1991), American baseball player
- Matt Svanson (born 1999), American baseball player
- Matt Swarmer (born 1993), American baseball player
- Matt Thaiss (born 1995), American baseball player
- Mat Toshack (born 1973), Australian former rugby league footballer
- Matt Trobbiani, Australian game designer
- Matt Turk (born 1968), American football player
- Matt Vierling (born 1996), American baseball player
- Matt Vogler (born 1969), American football player
- Matt Waletzko (born 1999), American football player
- Matt Wallner (born 1997), American baseball player
- Matt Ward (lacrosse player) (born 1983), American lacrosse player
- Matt Wieters (born 1986), American baseball player
- Matt Williams (third baseman) (born 1965), American baseball player
- Matt Wise (born 1975), American baseball player and coach
- Matt Wisler (born 1992), American baseball player
- Matt Zollers (born 2006), American football player for the Missouri Tigers

=== Musicians ===
- Matt Bellamy (born 1978), guitarist, pianist and lead singer of Muse
- Matt Berninger (born 1971), frontman and lead singer of The National
- Matt Bettinelli-Olpin (born 1978), original guitar player and co-songwriter for influential punk/ska band Link 80
- Matt Cameron (born 1962), former Soundgarden drummer and current drummer of Pearl Jam
- Matt Champion (born 1995), member of boy band Brockhampton
- Matt Costa (born 1982), singer/songwriter from Huntington Beach, California
- Matt Dangerfield, founder, lead vocalist and guitarist of English punk rock band The Boys
- Matt Dubb, American producer, composer, and arranger
- Matt Freeman (born 1966), bassist for the bands Operation Ivy and Rancid
- Matt Garstka (born 1989), drummer for metal band Animals as Leaders
- Matt Helders (born 1986), drummer for the Arctic Monkeys
- Matt Heafy (born 1986), vocalist and guitarist for the metal bands Trivium and Capharnaum
- Matty Healy (born 1989), vocalist and frontman of English pop rock band The 1975
- Matt Hoopes (born 1981), lead guitarist for the band Relient K
- Matt Houston (singer) (born 1977), French R&B singer and music producer originating from Guadeloupe (aka Matt)
- Matt Hunter (singer) (born 1998), American Latin-influenced pop singer, now known as Matt Hunter Correa
- Matt Johnson (singer) (born 1961), British singer/songwriter and founder and only constant member of multimedia band The The
- Mat Kearney (born 1978), American singer-songwriter and musician
- Matt Mahaffey (born 1973), American musician and producer
- Matt Maher (born 1974), Canadian contemporary Christian music artist, songwriter, and worship leader
- Matt Maeson (born 1993), American singer-songwriter
- Matt Maltese (born 1995), English singer-songwriter
- Matt Monro (1930–1985), British singer
- Mat Osman (born 1967), English musician, bassist of the rock band Suede
- Matt Redman (born 1974), English musician
- Matt Shultz (born 1983), lead singer of Cage The Elephant
- Matt Shadows (born 1981), vocalist for Avenged Sevenfold
- Matt Sharp (born 1969), former member of Weezer
- Matt Simmonds, demoscene musician
- Matt Slocum, former member of Sixpence None the Richer and composer of "Kiss Me"
- Matt Slocum (disambiguation), several people
- Matt Sorum (born 1960), hard rock drummer and percussionist
- Matt Traynor (born 1987), former drummer of Blessthefall
- Matt Tuck (born 1980), singer for Bullet for My Valentine
- M. Ward (born 1973), singer-songwriter and guitarist

=== Actors ===
- Mat Baynton (born 1980), British actor and musician
- Matt Bennett (born 1991), American actor
- Matt Berry (born 1974), British actor and musician
- Matt Bomer (born 1977), American actor
- Matt Cohen (actor) (born 1982), American actor
- Matt Czuchry (born 1977), American actor
- Matt Dallas (born 1982), American actor
- Matt Damon (born 1970), American actor
- Matt Dillon (born 1964), American actor
- Matt Evans (actor) (born 1986), Filipino actor
- Mat Fraser (fl. 1980s-present), English actor
- Matt Gunther (1963–1997), American actor and model
- Matt Hobby (born 1985), American actor and comedian
- Matt L. Jones (born 1981), American actor and comedian
- Matt Keeley (born 1991), American actor and writer
- Matt Lanter (born 1983), American actor
- Matt LeBlanc (born 1967), American actor
- Matt Lintz (born 2001), American actor
- Matt McCooey (born 1981), English-Japanese actor
- Matt Murray (actor) (born 1989), American actor
- Matt Newton (born 1977), American actor
- Matt Prokop (born 1990), American actor
- Matt Robinson (actor) (1937–2002), American actor
- Matt Ryan (actor) (born 1981), Welsh actor
- Matt Shipman, American voice actor
- Matt Shively (born 1990), American actor
- Matt Smith (actor) (born 1982), English actor
- Matt Stone (born 1971), American actor
- Mat Stevenson (born 1969), Australian actor
- Matt Zimmerman (actor) (1934–2022), Canadian actor
- Matt Walsh (comedian) (born 1964), American comedian and actor

=== Politicians ===
- Matt Bevin (born 1967), American politician
- Matt Blunt (born 1970), American politician and former naval officer
- Matt Cartwright (born 1961), American politician
- Mat Erpelding (born 1975), American politician
- Matt Gaetz (born 1982), American politician
- Matt Gonzalez, Green Party politician
- Matt Jeneroux (born 1981), Canadian politician
- Matt Jones (American politician), American politician
- Matt Lesser, American politician
- Matt Liang, Canadian politician
- Matt Mead (born 1962), American politician and attorney
- Matt Schlinker, American politician
- Matt Vitale, American politician
- Matt Wiebe (born 1979), Canadian politician

=== Writers, journalists and editors ===
- Matt Barbet, journalist
- Matt Bruenig (born 1988), American political commentator
- Matt Casamassina, editor for the website IGN
- Matt Cohen (writer), Canadian writer
- Matt Hill (writer), British writer
- Matt Hongoltz-Hetling, American journalist
- Matt Jones (writer) (born 1968), British television writer and television producer
- Matt Lauer, television journalist
- Matt Levine (columnist) (born 1978), Jewish journalist
- Matt Robinson (poet) (born 1974), Canadian poet
- Matt Walsh (political commentator) (born 1986), American right-wing political commentator and author

=== Other ===
- Matt Allwright, British television presenter
- Matt Clark (baseball) (born 1986), American professional baseball player
- Mat Collishaw (born 1966), English photographic and video artist
- Matt Cook (historian), Birkbeck College professor
- Mat Dickie, English indie video game developer
- Mat Franco (born 1988), American magician and winner of the ninth season of America's Got Talent
- Matt Groening, best known as the creator of The Simpsons and Futurama
- Matt Gunther (photographer), American artist
- Matt Harding, Internet celebrity better known as "Dancing Matt"
- Matt Harvey (born 1989), American professional baseball player
- Matt Iseman, American comedian and host of American Ninja Warrior since Season 2
- Matt Jones (interaction designer) (born 1968), active researcher and organizer of scientific conferences
- Matt Kemp (born 1984), American professional baseball player
- Mat Kirkby, English filmmaker, winner of the 2015 Academy Award for Best Live Action Short Film
- Matt Klentak (born 1980), American professional baseball executive
- Matt Kuwata, also known as Matt Rose, (born 1994), Japanese tarento, model, and musician
- Matt Lucas (born 1974), British comedian, best known for Little Britain
- Matt Mullenweg (born 1984), cofounder of WordPress and CEO of Automattic
- Matt Moore (baseball) (born 1989), American professional baseball player
- Matt Morgan (comedian), comedian and comedy writer
- Matt Nelson (disambiguation), multiple people
- Matt Pritchett, cartoonist in the UK Daily Telegraph
- Matt Sauer (born 1999), American professional baseball player
- Matt Taylor (scientist), project scientist for the Rosetta mission
- Matt Vesely, Australian filmmaker
- Matt West, choreographer
- Matt West (baseball), American professional baseball player

== Fictional characters ==
- Mat, a character in a Czech series Pat & Mat
- Mat Cauthon, a character in the Wheel of Time fantasy series
- Matt (Death Note) (real name: Mail Jeevas), in the anime Death Note
- Matt the Radar Technician, one-time Saturday Night Live character played by Adam Driver
- Matt Casey, a main character in the series Chicago Fire
- Matt Foley, Saturday Night Live parody character
- Matt Freeman (Power of Five), a character in Anthony Horowitz's The Power of Five series
- Matt Horner, in the StarCraft franchise
- Matt Hooper, in Jaws movie franchise
- Matt Ishida, Digimon Adventure
- Matt Murdock, secret identity of the Marvel Comics Earth-616 superhero Daredevil
- Matt Murdock, secret identity of the Marvel Comics Earth-65 supervillain Kingpin
- Matt Oleander, in Degrassi: The Next Generation
- Matt Parkman, a character from the tv show Heroes
- Matt Robinson (Neighbours), in the Australian soap opera Neighbours

== Surname ==
- Adolf von Matt (1909–1982), Swiss printer and politician
- Albert Edward Matt, British composer, Grand March: Fame and Glory (Op. 21)
- Andrea Matt (born 1961), Liechtenstein politician
- Annemarie von Matt (1905–1967), Swiss artist
- Elisabeth von Matt (1762–1814), Austrian astronomer
- Francis Xavier Matt, German-American immigrant and founder of Matt Brewing Company
- Hans von Matt (1899–1985), Swiss painter and sculptor
- Hans von Matt-Odermatt (1869–1932), Swiss editor and politician
- Hans von Matt-Stofer (1842–1900), Swiss publisher and politician
- Heinrich von Matt (died c. 1538), Landammann of Nidwalden
- Helmuth Matt (1946–2018), Liechtenstein chemist and politician
- Jamille Matt (born 1990), Jamaican footballer
- Johannes Matt (born 1961), Liechtenstein trustee and politician
- Josef von Matt (1901–1988), Swiss writer and publisher
- Leonard von Matt (1909–1988), Swiss photographer
- Patrick Matt (born 1969), Liechtenstein track cyclist
- Peter von Matt (1937–2025), Swiss philologist and author
- Richard Matt (1966–2015), American convicted murderer and prison escapee

== See also ==
- Maat (disambiguation)
- MAT (disambiguation)
- Matt (disambiguation)
- Matte (disambiguation)
- Matthew (name)
