= Von Matt family =

Family from Nidwalden, Switzerland

The von Matt family (also Vonmatt) is an old family of Nidwalden, originally from Dallenwil, whose members have been citizens of Stans since 1512. From the early 16th century it provided Landammänner (chief magistrates). A line of goldsmiths developed around 1700, and in the 19th century a line was founded whose members were active in publishing, politics, and the arts.

== History ==
The Winkelried House (Winkelriedhaus) at Stans-Oberdorf

The von Matt are an old family of Landleute (full citizens of the canton) of Nidwalden, originally from Dallenwil. They are first mentioned in 1322 with Welti Chunli von Matte. In 1512 (Jung) Hensli from Dallenwil became a Genossenbürger (member of the community sharing the common land) of Stans, and the family has held citizenship of Stans since then. The earliest documented ancestor is Hartmann. After some members of the family had pursued military careers and the von Matts had become connected by marriage with the Zelger family, the family provided its first Landammänner in the early 16th century (Heinrich). One expression of this social rise was the ownership of the Winkelried House (Winkelriedhaus) at Stans-Oberdorf.

Around 1700 a line of goldsmiths developed, descended from the guild master (Zunftmeister) Heinrich Anton. The most famous member of the family was the goldsmith Anton Maria, who moved to Sachseln in 1770. Other descendants worked in Lucerne as goldsmiths and watchmakers.

In the 19th century Kaspar and his son Hans founded a line whose members were active on the one hand in publishing and politics, and on the other in many fields of art. Their printing and publishing business produced, among other things, the Catholic conservative Nidwaldner Volksblatt, whose editorship remained in the hands of the von Matts until the middle of the 20th century. This journalistic platform and the family's extensive political, social, and cultural involvement opened the way for some members into the cantonal government (Adolf) and the Federal Assembly (Kaspar's son Hans and another Hans). Their engagement with the written word led several von Matts to literary work: Josef; Kaspar's son Hans; Hans's grandson Hans, who was also a painter and sculptor; and the latter's wife, the painter, draftswoman, and object artist Annemarie. Like these last two artists, the photographer Leonard also became known beyond Nidwalden.

== Bibliography ==
- K. von Deschwanden, "Urkundliches Verzeichniss der Landammänner, Vorgesetzten und Amtsleute des Landes Unterwalden nid dem Wald", in Der Geschichtsfreund, 26, 1871, 64–66
- Schweizerisches Geschlechterbuch, 7, 841–850
- F. von Matt, Stammbaum Hartmann von Matt, manuscript, 1981 (Kantonsbibliothek Nidwalden, Stans)
- H. von Matt, Kunst in Stans bis 1900, 1982

=== Archives ===
- Staatsarchiv Nidwalden, Stans
