= Joseph Wolfgang von Deschwanden =

Swiss mathematician and first director of ETH Zurich

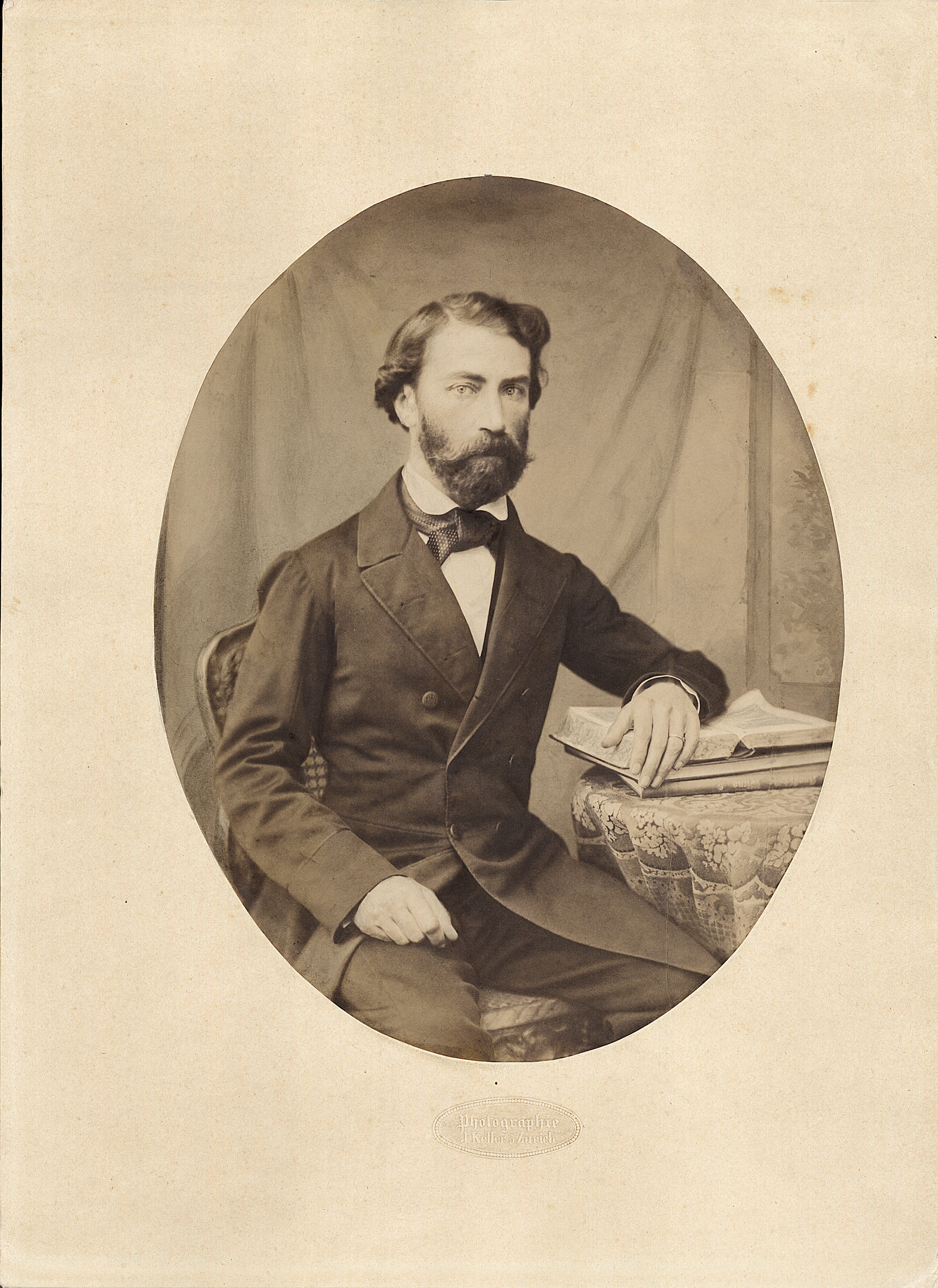
- Born: July 21, 1819; Stans, Nidwalden
- Died: April 11, 1866 (aged 46); Zurich
- Occupations: Mathematician; Professor; Academic administrator
- Spouse: Ottilie Grossbach (m. 1858)
- Children: 1 daughter

Joseph Wolfgang von Deschwanden (21 July 1819 – 11 April 1866) was a Swiss mathematician and educator. He was professor of applied mathematics and descriptive geometry, rector of the Zurich Industrial High School (Industrieschule), and the first director of the Swiss Federal Polytechnic School (ETH Zurich).

== Life and career ==
Von Deschwanden was born in Stans on 21 July 1819, the son of Louis Victor von Deschwanden, a captain, lawyer and amateur artist, and Carolina née von Deschwanden; his parents came from different branches of the Deschwanden family of Kerns. He was the eldest of four children and the older brother of Karl von Deschwanden and Theodor von Deschwanden.

After his early schooling in Stans, he attended the Catholic cantonal school of St. Gallen (1834–1837). In 1838 he was admitted to the second year of the Zurich Industrial High School (Industrieschule). After obtaining his diploma, he enrolled in 1840 at the University of Zurich. He became an assistant teacher of applied mathematics at the Industrial High School in 1841, and was appointed full professor the following year at the age of just 23. He served as rector of the school from 1847 to 1855. In 1858 he married Ottilie Grossbach, from a Lucerne family of teachers whose father, Ernst Grossbach, was originally from Bavaria; the couple had one daughter.

Von Deschwanden acquired his extensive knowledge in mathematics and engineering through study trips to southern Germany, France, Belgium, and Great Britain. He was considered a gifted communicator who could captivate his students, and his contemporaries also regarded him as a landscape painter of considerable sensitivity.

== Role in founding ETH Zurich ==
During the planning work for the creation of a federal university, the president of the Zurich cantonal government, Alfred Escher, appointed von Deschwanden in 1851 to the expert commission. With his specialist knowledge in engineering, he played a key role in drafting the bill that led to the Federal Act on the Federal Polytechnic School of 1854, establishing the Swiss Federal Polytechnic School. He became its first director in 1855, serving concurrently as professor of descriptive geometry. He stepped down from the directorship in 1859 but retained his teaching position until his death.

== Later life ==
An enthusiastic teacher and researcher, von Deschwanden found the administrative responsibilities increasingly burdensome. The workload of combining the roles of director and professor took a toll on his already fragile health. Regular periods of treatment provided only temporary relief from his chronic pulmonary tuberculosis. He died in Zurich on 11 April 1866, aged 46.

== Bibliography ==
=== Archival collections ===
- Hochschularchiv der ETH Zürich, Zurich, Nachlass Joseph Wolfgang von Deschwanden.
- Staatsarchiv Nidwalden, Stans, Familienarchiv Deschwanden.

=== Primary sources ===
- Jaeggli, Alvin (ed.): Katalog des Nachlasses von Josef Wolfgang von Deschwanden (1819–1866). Professor für darstellende Geometrie und erster Direktor des Eidgenössischen Polytechnikums in Zürich, 1969.
- Gyr, Peter (ed.): Katalog des Nachlasses von Josef Wolfgang von Deschwanden (1819–1866) – erster Direktor des Eidgenössischen Polytechnikums in Zürich, 1986 (supplement to the catalogue by Alvin Jaeggli).

=== Secondary literature ===
- Oechsli, Wilhelm: Festschrift zur Feier des fünfzigjährigen Bestehens des Eidg. Polytechnikums, 1905.
- Guggenbühl, Gottfried: Geschichte der Eidgenössischen Technischen Hochschule in Zürich, 1955.
- Wermke, Ernst: "Deschwanden, Joseph Wolfgang Aloys von", in: Neue Deutsche Biographie, vol. 3, 1957, pp. 613–614.
- Gyr, Peter: Josef Wolfgang von Deschwanden (1819–1866), erster Direktor des Eidgenössischen Polytechnikums in Zürich, doctoral thesis, University of Fribourg, 1981.
- Gugerli, David; Kupper, Patrick; Speich, Daniel: Die Zukunftsmaschine. Konjunkturen der ETH Zürich 1855–2005, 2005.
- Westermann, Andrea: "Das Tagebuch des ersten Polytechnikumsdirektors", in: Burri, Monika; Westermann, Andrea (eds.): ETHistory 1855–2005, 2005, pp. 215–218.
