= Nidwaldner Volksblatt =

Former newspaper of canton Nidwalden, Switzerland

- Type: Weekly (later biweekly and daily) newspaper
- Founder: Kaspar von Matt
- Founded: 1866
- Language: German
- Headquarters: Stans, Switzerland

The Nidwaldner Volksblatt was a newspaper of the canton of Nidwalden, Switzerland.

== History ==
The Nidwaldner Volksblatt was founded in 1866 as a Catholic conservative weekly by the printer Kaspar von Matt at Stans, and remained in the hands of the von Matt family until 1923. Among its notable editors were the publisher, poet, and politician Hans von Matt-Stofer (1867–1884); his son, the influential Catholic conservative National Councillor Hans von Matt-Odermatt (1884–1923); the chaplain and writer Konstantin Vokinger (1930–1953, contributing articles until his death in 1965); and, from 1979 to 1999, Werner Flury (born 1939, contributing articles until 2004). The paper gained a national resonance through the weekly world-politics reports that the parish priest of Kerns, Josef Ignaz von Ah, contributed from 1867 to 1896. It was later enriched by the religious and cultural supplement Nidwaldner Stubli (1923–1974).

On the initiative of a group of conservative clergy who considered the reformist Catholic positions of Hans von Matt-Odermatt insufficiently combative, the newspaper was sold in 1923 to the Nidwaldner Volksblatt company and thereafter appeared twice a week. Between 1985 and 1991 it was a daily, allied with the conservative Vaterland of Lucerne, and had some 4,000 subscribers. In 1991 it merged with the Nidwaldner Tagblatt to form the Nidwaldner Zeitung and became a regional edition of the Luzerner Zeitung (itself created around the same time from the merger of the Vaterland and the Luzerner Tagblatt). The Nidwaldner Volksblatt company, dissolved in 2017, made several unsuccessful attempts to revive the increasingly monopolized Nidwalden media landscape.

== Bibliography ==
- Fritz Blaser, Bibliographie der Schweizer Presse, 1958, 718
- Nidwaldner Volksblatt, 22 October 1966 (special issue)
- Karin Schleifer, Vom Kampfblatt zum Kopfblatt – 150 Jahre "Nidwaldner Volksblatt", 2017
- Max Huber, Unter Druck. Die Presse in der Zentralschweiz. Von den Anfängen bis zur Gegenwart, 2023, 120, 236, 361, 534–536
