= Martin Rosenberg (politician) =

Swiss journalist and politician

- Born: 29 March 1908; Bünzen, Switzerland
- Died: 1 January 1976 (aged 67); Bern, Switzerland
- Education: University of Fribourg
- Occupations: Journalist, politician
- Known for: Secretary General of the Conservative Christian Social People's Party
- Spouse: Lydia Fischer
- Children: 6, including Felix Rosenberg

Martin Rosenberg (29 March 1908 – 1 January 1976) was a Swiss journalist and politician who served as Secretary General of the Conservative Christian Social People's Party from 1941 to 1968. He was also a prominent Catholic student leader and federal editor of the Vaterland newspaper.

== Early life and education ==
Rosenberg was born on 29 March 1908 in Bünzen, a rural Catholic village, to Xaver Rosenberg, a farmer and innkeeper of the Rössli, and Anna Ammann. Following the custom of Catholic circles at the time, he attended the gymnasium in Einsiedeln from 1924 to 1928, then studied law at the University of Fribourg from 1929 to 1933, and subsequently in Paris and Louvain. He completed his studies in 1934 with a thesis on the ecclesiastical policy of Augustin Keller. In 1937, he married Lydia Fischer, a teacher also from the Freiamt. The couple had six children, including Felix Rosenberg, who would later become a Thurgau State Councillor and Director General of PTT (Posts, Telephones and Telegraphs).

== Career ==
=== Student leadership ===
Rosenberg built his entire political career on a network maintained since his youth and socialization within conservative Catholic institutions. As central president of the Schweizerischer Studentenverein (Swiss Student Association, SSS) from 1932 to 1933 and editor of its journal Civitas from 1937 to 1944, he faced the challenge of preventing the Catholic student world from shifting into the Frontist camp. Pursuing an ambivalent policy, particularly in his attitude toward the corporatist state, he required the SSS to distance itself from the Fronts in terms of association law, while authorizing collaboration on content matters, such as during the launch of a popular initiative for the total revision of the Federal Constitution.

=== Journalism ===
As editor of the federal section of the Vaterland from 1935 to 1972, the organ of the Lucerne Catholic conservatives, Rosenberg considered himself, along with other journalists, one of the spearheads of the Catholic milieu against radicalism and socialism. With his 1964 articles on the Mirage affair, he initiated the creation of Switzerland's first Parliamentary Inquiry Committee and thus played a decisive role in reorienting national defense and security policy.

=== Party politics ===
As Secretary General of the Conservative People's Party, later the Conservative Christian Social People's Party, from 1941 to 1968, Rosenberg contributed decisively to shaping the party's public image and defining its political position. Defending the institutional unity of the party, he left his mark on its reorganization in 1957. Compared to other Catholic conservative representatives of the time, he followed the rise of the Christian social movement with greater mistrust. In 1965, he was a founding member of the European Union of Christian Democrats (vice-president until 1971). It was also in his party's interest that Rosenberg worked for the adoption of the magic formula. With Federal Councillor Philipp Etter, his longtime friend, he played a decisive behind-the-scenes role in its introduction during the 1959 Federal Council election; this formula governed the composition of the government until 2003.

== Bibliography ==
=== Works by Rosenberg ===
- Rosenberg, Martin (1937). "Die kirchenpolitischen Ideen Augustin Kellers" [The ecclesiastical political ideas of Augustin Keller]. Revue d'histoire ecclésiastique suisse. 31: 1–36, 168–199, 209–241, 353–386.
- Rosenberg, Martin, ed. (1943–1955). Die Schweizerische Konservative Volkspartei. Jahrbücher 1939–1955 [The Swiss Conservative People's Party. Yearbooks 1939–1955].
- Rosenberg, Martin, ed. (1959–1967). Die Konservativ-christlichsoziale Volkspartei der Schweiz. Jahrbücher 1955–1967 [The Conservative Christian Social People's Party of Switzerland. Yearbooks 1955–1967].
- Rosenberg, Martin (1970). Der Frontenfrühling und die Erneuerungsbewegungen der dreissiger Jahre [The Front Spring and the renewal movements of the 1930s].

=== Secondary sources ===
- Secrétariat général du Parti conservateur populaire, ed. (1955). Drei Wahlen – und ihre Lehren. Die Bundeskanzlerwahl vom 13. Dezember 1951, die Bundesratswahl vom 22. Dezember 1953, der 16. Dezember 1954 [Three elections – and their lessons].
- Flury, Christoph (1994). «Von der Defensive zur gültigen Präsenz». Die Konservativ-Christlichsoziale Volkspartei der Schweiz in der Zeit nach dem Zweiten Weltkrieg (1950–1960) ["From defensive to valid presence". The Conservative Christian Social People's Party of Switzerland in the period after the Second World War (1950–1960)].
- Altermatt, Urs (2012). Das historische Dilemma der CVP. Zwischen katholischem Milieu und bürgerlicher Mittepartei [The historical dilemma of the CVP. Between Catholic milieu and bourgeois center party].
- Späti, Christina (2013). "Historische Parteienforschung in der Schweiz. Überblick, Forschungsstand und neue Perspektiven" [Historical party research in Switzerland. Overview, state of research and new perspectives]. Traverse. 20 (1): 156–172.
- Zaugg, Thomas (2020). "Katholizismus und Biografie. Möglichkeiten einer Sozialgeschichte jenseits von 'Ghetto', 'Moderne' und 'Antimoderne'" [Catholicism and biography. Possibilities of a social history beyond 'ghetto', 'modernity' and 'anti-modernity']. Revue suisse d'histoire. 70 (2): 196–218.
- Kunz, Lukas (2022). Martin Rosenberg (1908–1976). Eine politische Biografie [Martin Rosenberg (1908–1976). A political biography] (Master's thesis). University of Lausanne.
