= Theodor von Deschwanden =

Swiss painter (1826–1861)

- Born: February 26, 1826; Stans, Switzerland
- Died: December 19, 1861 (aged 35); Stans, Switzerland

Theodor von Deschwanden (26 February 1826 – 19 December 1861) was a Swiss genre and history painter from Stans, canton of Nidwalden. He was known for small-format works characterized by sentimentality, attention to detail, and a close observation of nature.

== Life and training ==
Deschwanden was born on 26 February 1826 in Stans into a Catholic family of the Kerns commune. He was the son of Louis Victor von Deschwanden, a captain, lawyer, and amateur artist, and the brother of Karl von Deschwanden. He learned the rudiments of drawing from his father before becoming a pupil of Melchior Paul von Deschwanden from 1840 to 1844, then of his brother Johann Wolfgang at the industrial school in Zurich. From 1845 he studied at the academy in Munich.

He subsequently traveled to Paris, Northern Italy, Belgium, and the Netherlands. During his time in Paris, he made numerous copies of works by Horace Vernet. He was a friend of Rudolf Koller, Robert Zünd, and Ernst Stückelberg, and counted among his patrons Queen Pauline of Württemberg and the princesses Charlotte of Salm and Elisabeth of Fürstenberg.

He died on 19 December 1861 in Stans at the age of 35.

== Work ==
Deschwanden produced genre and history paintings in small format, marked by sentimentality, fidelity to detail, and closeness to nature.

== Bibliography ==
- G. Hess, Kunstmaler Theodor Deschwanden, 1826–1861, 1951.
