= Adolf von Matt =

Swiss politician (1909–1982)

Member of the cantonal government (Regierungsrat) of Nidwalden
- In office 1962–1974

Municipal president (Gemeindepräsident) of Stans
- In office 1949–1952

Personal details
- Born: 19 August 1909 Stans, Switzerland
- Died: 7 December 1982 (aged 73) Stans, Switzerland
- Party: Catholic Conservatives, later CVP
- Spouse: Elisabeth Kaiser (m. 1945)
- Occupation: Printer; publisher

Adolf von Matt (19 August 1909 – 7 December 1982) was a Swiss printer, publisher, and Catholic conservative politician from Nidwalden. In 1932 he took over his father's printing works and publishing house in Stans, and from 1962 to 1974 he was a member of the cantonal government of Nidwalden.

== Biography ==
Adolf von Matt was a member of the von Matt family. He was the son of Adolf von Matt, a councillor (Ratsherr), and Marie née Achermann. In 1945 he married Elisabeth Kaiser, daughter of Franz Kaiser, a drawing teacher and councillor.

He attended primary school and the Gymnasium in Stans, which he did not complete, trained as a printer in Hochdorf, and attended a technical school for printing (Technikum für Buchdruck) in Leipzig, qualifying as a master printer. After a stay in Paris and a period as a manager in Visp, in 1932 he took over his father's printing works and the publishing house in Stans that published, among other titles, the Nidwaldner Volksblatt.

As a representative of the Catholic Conservatives, later the CVP, he was a member of the municipal council (Gemeinderat) of Stans from 1940 to 1952 and municipal president (Gemeindepräsident) from 1949 to 1952, and a member of the cantonal parliament (Landrat) from 1949 to 1962. From 1962 to 1974 he was a member of the cantonal government (Regierungsrat) of Nidwalden, where he headed finance (Finanzdirektor) from 1962 to 1970 and economic affairs (Volkswirtschaftsdirektor) from 1970 to 1974. As finance director he reformed the cantonal accounting system.

From 1962 to 1974 he chaired the board of directors of the Nidwalden electricity company (Elektrizitätswerk Nidwalden), and from 1971 to 1974 he was president of the bank council (Bankrat) of the Nidwalden cantonal bank (Nidwaldner Kantonalbank).

== Bibliography ==
- F. von Matt, Stammbaum Hartmann von Matt, manuscript, 1981 (Kantonsbibliothek Nidwalden, Stans)
- Nidwaldner Volksblatt, 24 December 1982

=== Archives ===
- Staatsarchiv Nidwalden, Stans
