= Werkbund =

Werkbund, a German compound word denoting a productive or creative association, may refer to:

- Deutscher Werkbund, a German association of artists, architects, designers, and industrialists, founded 1907
- Österreichischer Werkbund (de), an Austrian association of artists, architects, industrialists and craftsmen, founded 1912
- Schweizerischer Werkbund (de) (SWB), a Swiss association of artists and designers, founded 1913

== See also ==
- Werkbund Exhibition (1914), held in Cologne, Germany
