= Danioth =

Danioth is a surname. Notable people with the surname include:

- Aline Danioth (born 1998), Swiss alpine ski racer
- Heinrich Danioth (1896–1953), Swiss painter
