= Matte =

Matte may refer to:

== Art ==
- Paint with a non-glossy finish
  - See diffuse reflection
- A framing element surrounding a painting or watercolor within the outer frame

== Film ==
- Matte (filmmaking), filmmaking and video production technology
- Matte painting, a process of creating sets used in film and video
- Matte box, a camera accessory for controlling lens glare
- Open matte, a filming technique that involves matting out the top and bottom of the film frame in the movie projector

== People ==
- Tom Matte (1939–2021), American football player, quarterback in college and (mostly) running back in the NFL (1960s-1970s)
- René Matte (ice hockey), Canadian ice hockey coach
- Louis Matte, Canadian ice hockey coach
- Martin Matte, Canadian comedian
- Christian Matte, Canadian ice hockey player
- Joe Matte (ice hockey, born 1908), Canadian ice hockey player born 1908
- Joe Matte (ice hockey, born 1893), Canadian ice hockey player born 1893
- Matte family, a powerful Chilean family
- Sébastien Matte La Faveur, pharmacien particulier de Louis XIV

== Places ==
- Rivière à Matte (English: Matte's River), a tributary of the northwest shore of the St. Lawrence River, in Neuville, Quebec, Canada
- A neighborhood in Bern, Switzerland

== Other uses ==
- In American English, of a surface: having a non-glossy finish; see gloss (optics)
- Matte display, an electronic display with a matte surface
- Matte (metallurgy), a term for the liquid generated by smelting non-ferrous metals, such as copper

== See also ==
- Mat, a generic term for a piece of fabric or flat material, generally placed on a floor or other flat surface, and serving a range of purposes
- Mate (disambiguation)
- Matt (disambiguation)
- Matthew (disambiguation)
- Maat (disambiguation)
- Mat (disambiguation)
