= MATS =

The acronym MATS may refer to:

- Marc-André ter Stegen, a German footballer
- Master of Arts in Theological Studies, a graduate-level academic degree
- Measurements with Advanced Trapping Systems, an Helmholtz research group for young investigators
- Mercury and Air Toxics Standards, as set by the U.S. Environmental Protection Agency
- Metropolitan Adelaide Transport Study, an abandoned transport scheme for the city of Adelaide
- Military Air Transport Service, a defunct command of the United States Air Force
- Montgomery Area Transit System, the public transportation in Montgomery, Alabama
- Mainz-Tele-Surgery, the pediatric surgical telemedical service of the University Medical Center Mainz, Germany
- Mesospheric Airglow/Aerosol Tomography and Spectroscopy, a Swedish satellite project in atmospheric physics

== See also ==
- Mat (disambiguation)
- Mads (disambiguation)
