= René Matte =

René Matte may refer to:

- René Matte (politician) (1935–2016), Canadian politician
- René Matte (ice hockey) (born 1972), Canadian ice hockey coach and executive
