= Karl von Deschwanden =

Swiss jurist and legal historian

- Born: April 23, 1823; Stans, Nidwalden
- Died: April 25, 1889 (aged 66); Stans, Nidwalden
- Occupations: Lawyer, judge, legal historian
- Spouse: Caroline von Deschwanden (m. 1852)

Karl von Deschwanden (23 April 1823 – 25 April 1889) was a Swiss lawyer, judge, and legal historian from Stans, Nidwalden. He held several high judicial offices and contributed substantially to the legal history of Nidwalden, editing key primary sources and drafting a proposed civil law code for the canton.

== Life ==
Karl von Deschwanden was born in Stans on 23 April 1823, the son of Louis Victor von Deschwanden, a captain, lawyer, and amateur artist. He was the brother of Theodor von Deschwanden. In 1852 he married his cousin Caroline von Deschwanden, daughter of Niklaus von Deschwanden, a lawyer in Stans.

He attended the gymnasium in Stans before studying law in Zurich from 1842 to 1844, where he came under the influence of Friedrich Ludwig Keller and Johann Caspar Bluntschli. He subsequently practiced as a lawyer in Stans.

== Career ==
=== Journalism and politics ===
In 1848–1849, Deschwanden edited the Nidwaldner Wochenblatt, a radical newspaper in which he advocated for the federal state, a full revision of the cantonal constitution, and the humanization of criminal law. He served as secretary of Stans (1854), member of the communal executive council (1860), and president of the municipality (1866). He sat in the Nidwalden Grand Council from 1862 to 1874 and was a member of the Constituent Assembly of 1877.

=== Judicial offices ===
Deschwanden held successive judicial positions in Nidwalden: president of the police court (1866), president of the court of cassation (1881), and president of the cantonal court (1887).

=== Legal scholarship ===
He was a member of the legislative commission for the revision of Nidwalden civil law. His draft property law (Sachenrechtsentwurf) of 1863, though discussed, was never enacted. He published widely on Nidwalden legal history, with contributions appearing notably in the Zeitschrift für Schweizerisches Recht and the Geschichtsfreund. He also edited several legal sources from Nidwalden as well as the federal diet recesses (Eidgenössische Abschiede) for the period 1533–1555.

He was a founding member and president of the Nidwalden Historical Society (1864), a major in the cantonal militia, and president of the Nidwalden officers' society. The University of Zurich awarded him an honorary doctorate.

== Bibliography ==
=== Works ===
- Contributions to the Zeitschrift für Schweizerisches Recht and Geschichtsfreund
- Edition of Nidwalden legal sources
- Edition of the Eidgenössische Abschiede, 1533–1555

=== Secondary literature ===
- B. Zelger, Karl von Deschwanden und sein Sachenrechtsentwurf für Nidwalden, 1974
