= Leonard von Matt =

Swiss photographer (1909–1988)

- Born: 14 March 1909; Stans, Switzerland
- Died: 12 November 1988 (aged 79); Wolfenschiessen, Switzerland
- Occupation: Photographer
- Spouse: Brigitte Lehmann (m. 1937)
- Father: Hans von Matt-Odermatt
- Relatives: Hans von Matt (brother); Josef von Matt (brother)

Leonard von Matt (14 March 1909 – 12 November 1988) was a Swiss photographer. He was the author of more than 50 photo books on art, architecture, and religion, with a focus on Rome and Italy. Like his brother, the artist Hans von Matt, and Hans's wife Annemarie von Matt, he became known beyond Nidwalden.

== Biography ==
Leonard von Matt was the son of Hans von Matt and a brother of Hans and Josef. In 1937 he married Brigitte Lehmann. He attended the college (Kollegium) in Stans and, from 1924 to 1928, the Gymnasium in Engelberg.

He worked as a bookseller from 1930 to 1936 and as an assistant at the Eidenbenz studio (Atelier Eidenbenz) in Basel in 1938–1939, and was a freelance photographer from 1945 to 1973. He was the author of more than 50 photo books on art, architecture, and religion, with a focus on Rome and Italy. In 1995 a retrospective of his work was shown in Lucerne.

== Works ==
- Leonard von Matt, edited by M. Kaiser-von Matt et al., 1995

== Bibliography ==
- Photographie in der Schweiz, 1992
- M. Kaiser-von Matt et al., "Leonard von Matt", in Nidwaldner Kalender, 135, 1994, 61–73
