= Mat (disambiguation) =

A mat is a hard or soft floor covering that generally is placed on a floor or other flat surface.

Mat or MAT may also refer to:

== Places ==
- Mat District, a district in Dibër County, Albania
- Mat (municipality), a municipality in Dibër County, Albania
- Mat (Adriatic Sea), a river in Albania
- Mat (region), in Albania
- Mat River, a tributary of the Kaladan River in Mizoram State, India
- Mat River, Virginia, a tributary of the Mattaponi River in the United States

== People ==
- Mat (name), a masculine given name
- Mats (given name)

== MAT ==
- MAT Macedonian Airlines
- MAT Airways, defunct, Skopje, Republic of Macedonia
- Malta, UNDP country code
- Management Aptitude Test, India
- Manifattura Automobili Torino, Italian cars manufacturer
- Manufacture Nationale d'Armes de Tulle, French manufacturer of MAT-49 machine pistol
- Master of Arts in Teaching, degree
- Medial axis transform
- Medication-assisted treatment
- Micro alloy transistor
- Middletown Area Transit, a transit district serving Middlesex County, Connecticut
- Miller Analogies Test, a graduate school admissions test
- Mission Against Terror, a 2011 video game
- Mobile Anisotropy Telescope
- Moghreb Athletic Tetouan, a Moroccan sports club
- Monades Apokatastasis Taksis, a special police force in Greece
- Monoamine transporter
- Most advantageous tender, a means of evaluating tenders in procurement
- Moscow Art Theatre, a theatre company
- Mousterian of Acheulean tradition _{(fr)}, a cultural and technological facies of the Mousterian
- Multi-academy trust a UK schools governance model
- Multi Axis Trainer, another name for an aerotrim, a 3-axis gimbal used for training of pilots and astronauts
- Multifocal atrial tachycardia, an irregular heart rhythm
- National Rail station code of Matlock railway station, England
- Maghawir al-Thawra (MaT), the Arabic name of the Revolutionary Commando Army

== Other uses ==
- A flong or matrix, a paper mould made from an impression of printing type
- Mat (1926 film), Soviet Union
- Mat (picture framing)
- Mat (Russian profanity), a category of Russian-language profanities
- A character in the Czech stop-motion series Pat & Mat
- A clump or plait of densely tangled hair or fur; in humans, this may include:
  - Dreadlocks
  - Polish plait
- Gospel of Matthew
- Mat_{m×n}(R), a notation for the algebra of m×n matrices over a ring R
- The Mats or the Replacements, American rock band

== See also ==
- MATS (disambiguation), acronym
- Lệ Mật, a village in Vietnam
- Maat (disambiguation)
- Mati (disambiguation)
- Matt (disambiguation)
- Matte (disambiguation)
- Matthew (given name)
