= Josef Ignaz von Ah =

Swiss priest and writer (1834–1896)

- Lithograph from the Schweizerische Portrait-Gallerie, 1888
- Born: 15 December 1834; Sachseln, Switzerland
- Died: 31 August 1896 (aged 61); Kerns, Switzerland
- Occupations: Priest; teacher; writer

Josef Ignaz von Ah (15 December 1834 – 31 August 1896) was a Swiss priest, educator, and writer. His appeal to Swiss Catholics in 1856 led to the founding of the Piusverein in 1857, and from 1866 until his death he wrote about 1,500 editorials on world affairs for the Nidwaldner Volksblatt.

== Biography ==
Josef Ignaz von Ah was the son of Theodor, a farmer and shoemaker, and Anna Maria née Imfeld. He attended the secondary school and the Gymnasium in Sarnen from 1844 and the lyceum in Einsiedeln from 1852, and he studied philosophy and theology at the seminary in Chur. After his ordination as a priest in 1857 he was a curate in Bern, and from 1859 in Fribourg. In 1863 he became a catechist and teacher in Stans, and in 1867 parish priest of Kerns. From 1873 to 1887 and from 1895 to 1896 he was a school inspector and a member of the education council (Erziehungsrat) of Obwalden.

His early literary acquaintance with the French pulpit orators and with liberal Catholicism inspired him in 1856 to launch an appeal to Swiss Catholics, which led to the founding of the Piusverein (Pius IX Association) in 1857. He was its first secretary until 1863. As an educator, preacher, and author of edifying historical books and patriotic plays, he was known beyond the canton. From 1866 until his death he wrote about 1,500 editorials on world affairs for the Nidwaldner Volksblatt, which earned him the nickname Weltüberblicker ("surveyor of the world"). Thanks to his broad-mindedness, he had connections with the various political camps.

== Works ==
- Ausgewählte Predigten und Predigt-Entwürfe, edited by J. Beck, 5 vols., 1904–1915

== Bibliography ==
- N. Duss, Josef Ignaz von Ah, 1834–1896, 1975 (with a list of works)
- E. Omlin, Die Geistlichen Obwaldens vom 13. Jahrhundert bis zur Gegenwart, 1984
- P. A. von Segesser: Briefwechsel, edited by V. Conzemius, vols. 5–8, 1992–
