= Annemarie von Matt =

Swiss artist (1905–1967)

Annemarie von Matt (born Marie Gunz: 10 April 1905 – 27 November 1967) was a Swiss painter, graphic artist and writer.

== Life ==
Marie Gunz was born in Root, a Catholic village to the north of Luzern, along the road towards Zürich. Konstantin Gunz, her father, was a train driver. The third of her parents' seven recorded children, she was described during her school years as "a wild girl who loved to draw". She received not quite seven years of schooling, which was normal for her class at this time, and then took a series of jobs in domestic service, both as a nanny and as a housemaid. There was no question of higher education: she is identified in some sources as a "self-taught artist". That does not tell the full story, however. She was ambitious and strikingly beautiful. As a young women she took studio work as a nude model which gave her a connection to the dynamic artistic network in central Switzerland in the 1920s. She approached her artistic career from the Arts and Crafts movement, studying with the goldsmith Martha Haefeli in Luzern between 1926 and 1928. Her first textiles work, her first wall hangings and her first drawings quickly followed. Marie became Annemarie. She took her inspiration, especially, from popular religious art. Frequent themes were saints and madonnas (carvings on slate, sculpture, oil and tempera paintings, domestic altars). At the same time, the fevered beau monde optimism radiated out from Paris and New York towards central Switzerland. Her art increasingly challenged conventions and celebrated the pleasure principal. At the end of the 1920s she found acceptance in artist circles, joining the Schweizerischer Werkbund and, later, the "Gesellschaft Schweizerischer Malerinnen, Bildhauerinnen und Kunstgewerblerinnen" ("Association of Swiss women painters, sculptors and Artists" / GSMBK). She enjoyed increasing public recognition and received commissions, including one for a postage stamp celebrating the Female Auxiliaries (" Frauenhilfsdienst"). Her works featured regularly in exhibitions in Switzerland between 1929 and 1940.

Another member of the youthful artistic circle of the time was the painter-sculptor Hans von Matt (1899–1985) whom Annemarie Gunz married she was thirty, in 1935. Hans was from Stans, an ancient city in the hills to the south of the lake, and it was here that the couple made their home. Her new husband was a member of a long established Nidwalden family. Annemarie von Matt's own profile as an artist, exhibiting and winning arts prizes at festivals in the region, seems to have been enhanced by her marriage. At the same time she herself became the model for some of his sculpted figures. Hans and Annemarie von Matt remained married until her death in 1967.

Sources differ over when Annemarie von Matt first met the charismatic author-theologian Josef Vital Kopp, but their love affair blossomed in 1940. The affair was conducted, in part, by letter, and at times achieved what one source identifies as "literary merit". Annemarie's art was no longer so widely displayed in central Switzerland, where the impact of war in all the surrounding countries had in any case triggered economic austerity and a reduced appetite for challenging public art. The love affair became increasingly a thing of unhappiness, and she became increasingly withdrawn, spending much of her time in solitude reading, writing or arranging and cataloguing her art collection.

The years 1946-1955 can be seen as Annemarie von Matt's second period. The few sculpted forms she produced had a magical symbolism and later came to be seem as precursors of concept art. There are also drawings and collages which mirror her own "individual mythology". During the time she also authored numerous aphoristic observations, "word pictures" and poems that draw attention to her fascination with language. After 1955 she was no longer productive, and by the time of her death she had been largely forgotten. Interest in her work has revived subsequently, however.
