= Konstantin Vokinger =

Swiss priest and writer (1888–1965)

- Born: 17 June 1888; Stans, Switzerland
- Died: 13 October 1965 (aged 77); Zug, Switzerland
- Occupations: Priest; editor; writer

Konstantin Vokinger (17 June 1888 – 13 October 1965) was a Swiss priest, newspaper editor, and writer. He was editor of the Nidwaldner Volksblatt from 1930 to 1953. From 1930 to 1934 he campaigned for the canton of Nidwalden to supply its own electric power, and he contributed substantially to the approval of a cantonal power plant by the Landsgemeinde in 1934. He wrote works on historical, religious, and folklore subjects.

== Biography ==
Konstantin Vokinger was the son of Adalbert, a state archivist (Staatsarchivar) and heraldist, and Marie née Odermatt. After attending St. Fidelis College (Kollegium St. Fidelis) in Stans, he studied theology in Chur and was ordained a priest in 1912. He was a chaplain in Obbürgen from 1913 to 1922, an assistant priest (Pfarrhelfer) in Wolfenschiessen from 1922 to 1930, and a chaplain in Büren, Nidwalden, from 1930 to 1938. He promoted the building of new churches in Obbürgen and Büren, and in Wolfenschiessen he had a children's home built, financed by a wealthy citizen of the municipality who had emigrated to America.

From the 1920s Vokinger wrote radio plays and radio addresses, as well as articles for the Nidwaldner Kalender. From 1930 to 1953 he was editor of the Nidwaldner Volksblatt, and he wrote for it until his death. He shaped the paper with his conservative and popular style.

From 1930 to 1934 Vokinger campaigned politically for the canton of Nidwalden to supply itself with electric power. He paid for the first engineering work himself and promoted the power plant in the press. After the newspaper's company (Gesellschaft Nidwaldner Volksblatt) put a stop to his open partisanship, he published his opinions from 1933 in a polemical periodical, Der Bannalperbote. In this way he contributed substantially to the approval of the project for a cantonal power plant by the Landsgemeinde of 1934. After a falling-out with the initiative committee at the end of 1934, he was no longer politically active.

To devote more time to his work as a writer and editor, Vokinger became chaplain of the convent of St. Clare (Frauenkloster St. Klara) in Stans in 1938, a post he held until his death in Zug in 1965. He wrote works on historical, religious, and folklore subjects.

== Works ==
- Bruder-Klausen-Buch, 1936
- Nidwaldens Freiheitskampf 1798, 1940
- Die Kirche von Stans, 1947
- Nidwalden, Land und Leute, 1958

== Bibliography ==
- Nidwaldner Volksblatt, 16 October 1965; 22 October 1966 (special issue)
