= Melchior Lussy =

Swiss statesman (1529–1606)

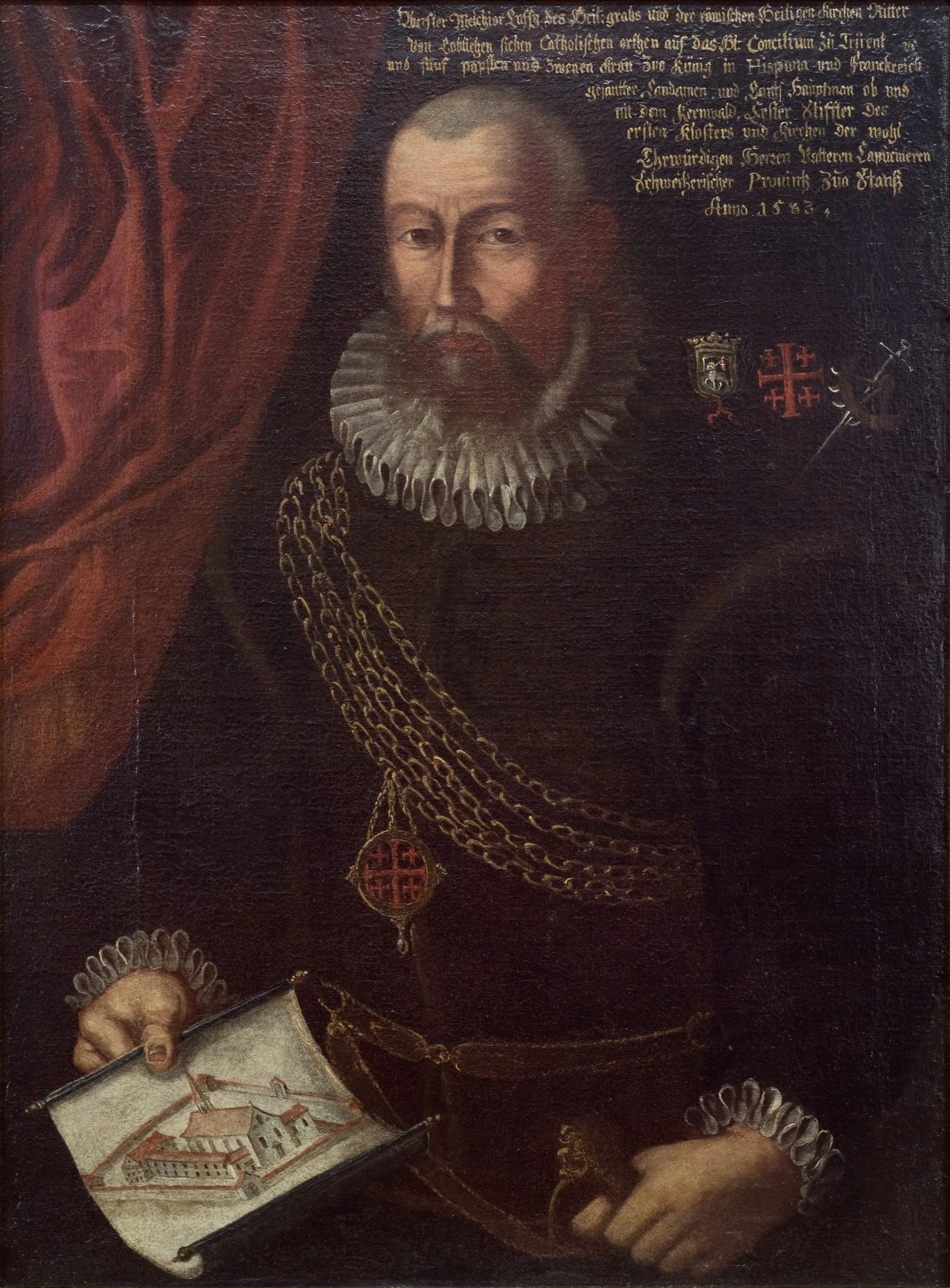
Anonymous portrait, 1583

Melchior Lussy, also known as Melchior Lussi (1529 – 14 November 1606), was a Swiss political leader, mercenary and diplomat who represented the Catholic cantons of Switzerland at the Council of Trento. He was the most powerful Swiss statesman of the second half of the 16th century, along with Ludwig Pfyffer von Altishofen, and a leading figure of the Counter-Reformation in Switzerland.

== Biography ==
Lussy was born in 1529 in Stans, in the canton of Nidwalden, the son of Johann Lussy, Vogt of the Engelberg valley. He belonged to a family of magistrates, originally from Beckenried, that had moved to Stans around 1500. After studying at the convent school of Engelberg, Lussy learned Italian with his uncle Peter Lussy, Landvogt of Bellinzona, and became an interpreter to the Landvogt of Locarno. He served as the head clerk of Nidwalden from 1551 to 1555. In 1554, Lussy entered French service as chief field clerk, and later commanded Swiss mercenaries in the pope's service that were defeated near Paliano in 1557, during the Italian War of 1551–1559.

Lussy returned to Switzerland in 1558 and was appointed Landvogt of Bellinzona the same year. His friendship with Carlo Borromeo, future Archbishop of Milan, gave him access to influential circles in Northern Italy and led, in 1560, to the conclusion of a treaty with the Republic of Venice for the recruitment of Swiss mercenaries. Lussy gained prestige and wealth from his pension as a Swiss colonel in Venetian service. He bought Winkelriedhaus in Stans, which he turned into an impressive Renaissance residence, as well as other properties in Stans and Obbürgen. Lussy would also built in 1586 a manorial residence in Wolfenschiessen, called the "High House" (Hechhuis).

In 1561, Lussy was elected Landamman of Nidwalden; he went on to serve eleven terms in this office until 1595. From 1562 to 1563, he was the envoy of the Catholic cantons to the Council of Trento. Lussy went on diplomatic missions to Paris in 1582, where he signed a Swiss alliance with France, Madrid in 1589, Savoy and Florence, and met several popes. He supported the Counter-Reformation by inviting Capuchins to Nidwalden and founding a convent in Stans in 1582. In his later years, Lussy considered leaving his functions and becoming a hermit, but was dissuaded by his wife and relatives. He went on pilgrimages to Jerusalem in 1583, where he was made a Knight of the Holy Sepulchre, and to Santiago de Compostela in 1590.

Lussy married four times: first Katharina Amlehn from Lucerne; second, Marie Cleopha zu Käs, also from Lucerne; third, Anna Auf der Maur from Schwyz; and fourth, Agatha Wingartner from Stans. He became the first Landeshauptmann of Obwalden and Nidwalden in 1593, but was forced to retire from politics in 1596 due to apoplexy. Lussy died in Stans on 14 November 1606.
