= Luzerner Tagblatt =

Former newspaper of Lucerne, Switzerland

- Type: Daily newspaper
- Founder: Xaver Meyer von Schauensee
- Founded: 1 January 1852
- Language: German
- Headquarters: Lucerne, Switzerland

The Luzerner Tagblatt was a daily newspaper published in Lucerne, Switzerland, from 1 January 1852 to 31 October 1991.

== History ==
Until June 1858 the paper bore the title Tagblatt für die Kantone Luzern, Uri, Schwyz, Unter- und Obwalden und Zug. Launched by the printer and publisher Xaver Meyer von Schauensee as a simple, politically neutral advertising sheet, it became the principal Radical newspaper of central Switzerland. In 1879 Heinrich Keller took over its printing, and in 1884 its publication. Founded in 1916, Keller & Co. became a joint-stock company in 1921 but remained in the family's hands until 1939; thereafter the capital was held sometimes by Radical interests and sometimes by majority shareholders.

The Luzerner Tagblatt's readership, and then its advertising volume, began to be overtaken by those of the Luzerner Neuste Nachrichten, an independent newspaper. To counter this competition, the publishers of the Luzerner Tagblatt and of the daily Vaterland (close to the Christian Democratic People's Party) founded the advertising pool Tandem in 1971. In 1990 the Luzerner Tagblatt had a print run of 38,400 copies (including its three regional editions). In 1991 it merged with the stronger Vaterland to form the Luzerner Zeitung, which became the Neue Luzerner Zeitung after merging in turn, in 1995, with the Luzerner Neuste Nachrichten.

== Bibliography ==
- Wechsel und Bestand, 1988
- M. Huber, Geschichte der politischen Presse im Kanton Luzern 1914–1945, 1989
- H. Kunz, Der Luzerner Presse-Eintopf, [1996]
- K. Suter, Pressegeschichte des Kantons Luzern von 1945 bis 1970, 1996
