= Hans von Matt =

Swiss artist (1899–1985)

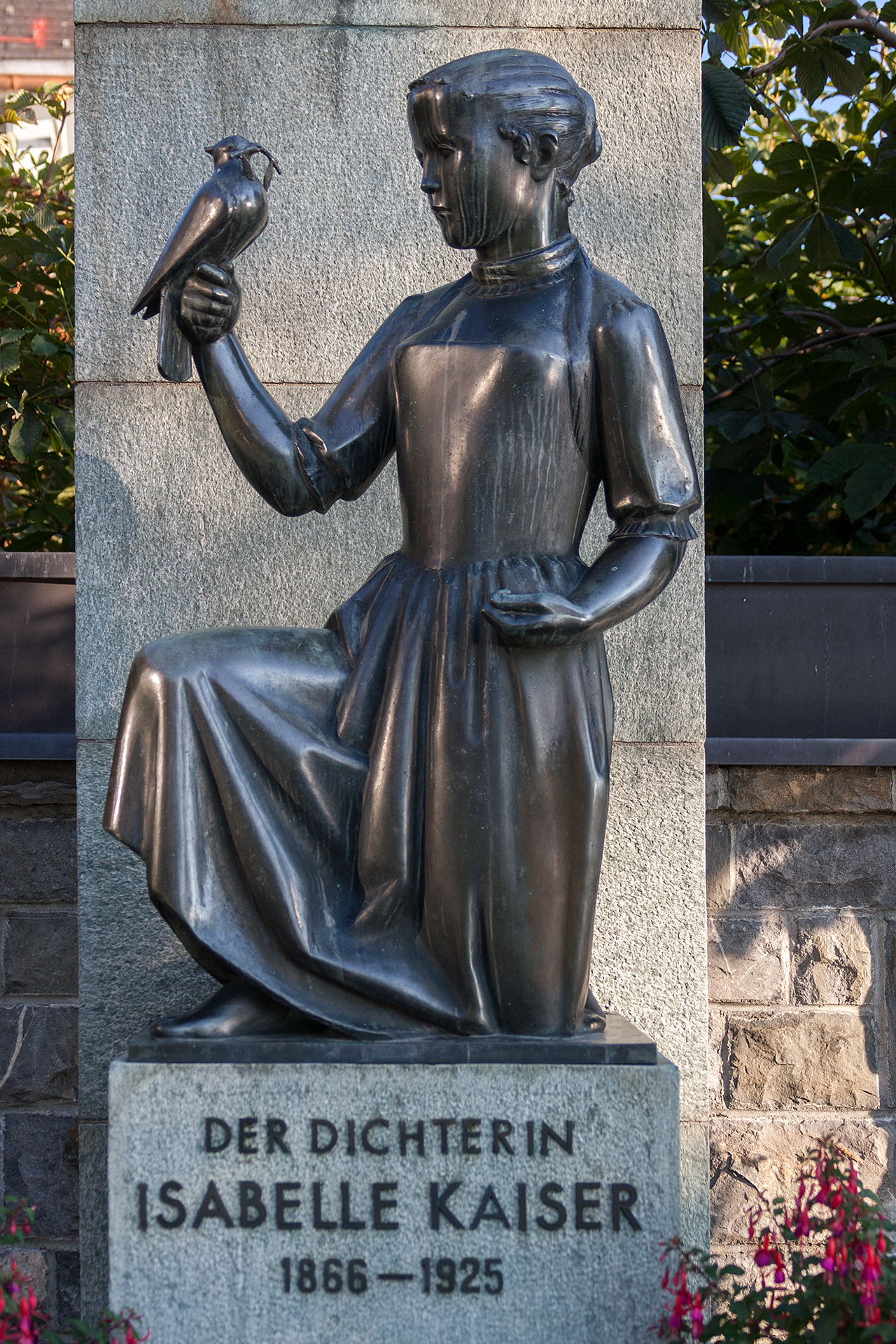
- " Mädchen mit Taube", Beckenried; Memorial for Isabelle Kaiser, 1866-1925 Hans von Matt, 1935
- Born: Hans Caspar von Matt; 7 May 1899; Stans, Nidwalden, Switzerland
- Died: 8 November 1985 (aged 86); Stans, Nidwalden, Switzerland
- Occupations: painter sculptor author arts administrator
- Spouse: Annemarie Gunz (1905-1967)
- Parent(s): Hans von Matt senior (1869-1932); Marie von Odermat (1877-1972)

Hans von Matt (7 May 1899 - 8 November 1985) was a Swiss painter and sculptor. He was at the heart of an artists' network, known to some contemporaries as much for their fun-loving lifestyle as for serious artistic endeavour. He emerged as a writer on the arts and a "culture politician". He was born and lived in Central Switzerland.

== Life ==
Hans Caspar von Matt was born in Stans, the administrative capital of the Nidwalden, a small rural German-speaking canton on the south side of Lake Lucerne. His father, also called Hans von Matt (1869–1932), was a book dealer and local magistrate who took up politics and became a CVP member of the Swiss parliament.

After successful completion of his schooling, in 1918 Hans von Matt enrolled in the class of Joseph von Moos at the Lucerne University of Applied Sciences and Arts on the far side of the lake. The next year he moved further afield, entering the École des Beaux-Arts (as it was known at that time) in Geneva. Here he studied painting and sculpture under David Estoppey and James Vibert respectively. Von Matt was becoming an assiduous networker, and during his time in Geneva he made contact with Kurt Seligmann and Alberto Giacometti. During 1920 he undertook a lengthy study trip to Florence where he was much impressed by what he saw of the work of Sandro Botticelli. He was a student at the Munich Fine Arts Academy between 1921 and 1923. Later in the 1920s he attended several of the winter courses given in Paris by André Lhote.

In 1924 he began establishing himself as an artist, and later also as a sculptor, in Stans, his hometown, where in 1927 he built his own studio. On 25 September 1935 Hans von Matt married the artist-model Annemarie Gunz in Stans. She was a prominent participant in the central Switzerland arts scene of the time, and sat as the model for several of Hans von Matt's better known paintings of women.

Around 1939 Hans von Matt set out on a parallel career as a writer on themes such as folklore and local history. He also published a number of monographs on well known personalities from Central Switzerland. These included the artists Melchior Wyrsch and Heinrich Danioth, along with the sculptor Josef Maria Christen. Another was the Lucerne-based conservator and arts patron Paul Hilber.

In 1927 he became a member of the Swiss Werkbund (artists' association). In 1937 he became a member of the Luzern Arts Society ("Kunstgesellschaft Luzern"), serving as its vice-president from 1958. He was a member of the National Arts Commission ("Eidgenössische Kunstkommission") between 1941 and 1953, and its vice-president between 1949 and 1953. He was a founder, and between 1944 and 1953 a member of the executive board with the Swiss Luke Society for Promoting Church Art ("Schweizerische Lukasgesellschaft zur Förderung der kirchlichen Kunst"). And between 1947 and 1974 he was a member of the Nidwalden canton Historical Society.

== Works ==
Hans von Matt's career as an artists began during his student years in Munich and Geneva. Initially he was drawn towards expressionism. Later in the 1920s, influenced by the cubist precepts of André Lhote in Paris and by Karl Geiser, von Matt's styles acquired a more individualistic form, clear and compact. His figures of maidens and of saints display a gentleness of expression and softened body shapes. Human bodily forms up till 1961 also tend towards a slightly lengthened distorted shape.

Commissions for contemporary religious sculpture provided many opportunities for church statuary and grave memorials across the northern part of Switzerland. As he grew older he increasingly favoured smaller bronze and terracotta figures. From 1961 he began to engage with the more abstract forms associated with Jean Arp, Henri Laurens and Henry Moore. His figures now no longer appeared in such self-contained forms, but were characterised by "break-outs" and sweeping lines.

== Prizes (selection) ==
- 1963 Luzern Press prize (for authorship)
- 1969 Central Switzerland Arts prize (for authorship)

== Family ==
Hans von Matt's had four brothers. Two of these were the writer and radio personality Josef von Matt (1901–1988) and the photographer Leonard von Matt.
