= Heinrich von Matt =

Landammann of Nidwalden (died c. 1538)

- Died: c. 1538
- Title: Landammann of Nidwalden
- Term: 1527, 1529, 1533, 1536
- Spouse: Margret Zelger (m. 1505)
- Father: (Jung) Hensli

Heinrich von Matt (first mentioned 1510; died c. 1538) was Landammann (chief magistrate) of Nidwalden in 1527, 1529, 1533, and 1536. He was one of the first members of the von Matt family to hold the office.

== Biography ==
The Winkelried House (Winkelriedhaus) in Stans, which Heinrich von Matt owned from 1530

Heinrich von Matt was the son of (Jung) Hensli (Hensli the Younger), a mercenary from Dallenwil who was at the Battle of Novara in 1513. In 1505 he married Margret Zelger, daughter of Marquard Zelger. In 1512 he and his father became Genossenbürger (members of the community sharing the common land) of Stans.

He was bailiff (Landvogt) of Blenio from 1510 to 1511 and an envoy to the Federal Diet (Tagsatzung) from 1516 to 1520, and from 1525 he was treasurer (Säckelmeister). He was Landammann of Nidwalden in 1527, 1529, 1533, and 1536. From 1530 he owned the Winkelried House (Winkelriedhaus) in Stans.

After some members of the von Matt family had pursued military careers and the family had become connected by marriage with the Zelger family, it provided its first Landammänner in the early 16th century, among them Heinrich. One expression of this social rise was the ownership of the Winkelried House.

== Bibliography ==
- K. von Deschwanden, "Urkundliches Verzeichniss der Landammänner, Vorgesetzten und Amtsleute des Landes Unterwalden nid dem Wald", in Der Geschichtsfreund, 26, 1871, 64; 27, 1872, 1–2
- H. Achermann, H. Horat, Das Winkelriedhaus, 1993, 30
