= Rochus Lussi =

Swiss artist

- Rochus Lussi on 21 November 2009 in Genova (photo by Markus Wiedemeier)
- Born: 5 August 1965 (age 60); Stans, Switzerland
- Known for: sculpture

Rochus Lussi (born 5 August 1965 in Stans) is a Swiss artist.

Lussi has worked as an independent sculptor in Stans (Nidwalden) as a woodwork and art teacher since 1992.

1988–1995 Formal studies as sculptor in Brienz (Bern), further courses at the Art School in Lucerne and one year of studies with Jan Hendrych at the Academy of Fine Arts in Prague (Czech Republic). Head of exhibition group, Galerie Chäslager, Stans, 2002–2007.

Board member of visarte central Switzerland (visual arts association, Switzerland)
Member of the Culture Commission, canton of Nidwalden
Work as a curator in different exhibition projects.
