= Hans von Matt-Stofer =

Swiss politician (1842–1900)

- Oil portrait by Carl Georg Kaiser, 1899

Member of the National Council
- In office 1890–1896

Member of the cantonal government (Regierungsrat) of Nidwalden
- In office 1890–1898

Personal details
- Born: 7 August 1842 Stans, Switzerland
- Died: 30 September 1900 (aged 58) Lucerne, Switzerland
- Party: Catholic Conservative
- Spouse: Marie Stofer (m. 1867)
- Children: Hans von Matt-Odermatt
- Parent(s): Kaspar von Matt; Aloisia Lussi
- Occupation: Publisher; editor; antiquarian bookseller

Hans von Matt, also known as Hans von Matt-Stofer (7 August 1842 – 30 September 1900), was a Swiss publisher, man of letters, and Catholic conservative politician from Nidwalden. In 1866 he and his father were among the founders of the Nidwaldner Volksblatt, whose editorship he took over in 1867. He was a member of the National Council from 1890 to 1896.

== Biography ==
Hans von Matt was the son of Kaspar von Matt, a councillor (Ratsherr) and church administrator (Kirchmeier), and Aloisia Lussi. In 1867 he married Marie Stofer, daughter of Kaspar Stofer. He attended primary school and the Gymnasium in Stans. After joining his father's printing and trading business, he worked as a traveling salesman and editor, and later as a publisher, antiquarian bookseller, and man of letters.

From 1874 to 1877 he was a member of the Nidwalden cantonal parliament (Landrat). He was municipal president (Gemeindepräsident) of Stans from 1877 to 1879 and a member of its municipal council (Gemeinderat) until 1883. He was also a member of the constitutional council (Verfassungsrat) in 1876–1877, a member of the poor relief board (Armenrat) of Stans from 1877 to 1880, a judge of the high court (Oberrichter) from 1877 to 1883, and church administrator (Kirchmeier) from 1889 to 1891. From 1890 to 1896 he sat in the National Council as a Catholic conservative, and from 1890 to 1898 he was a member of the cantonal government (Regierungsrat), heading the education department from 1895 to 1898.

He was a member of the Schweizerischer Studentenverein and sat on the boards of the Historical Society of Nidwalden (Historischer Verein Nidwalden), of the journal Katholische Schweizerblätter, and of the Swiss Society for the Preservation of Historic Art Monuments (Schweizerische Gesellschaft für die Erhaltung historischer Kunstdenkmäler).

In 1866 Hans von Matt and his father were among the founders of the Nidwaldner Volksblatt, whose editorship he took over in 1867. With the help of Philipp Anton von Segesser and Josef Ignaz von Ah, among others, he succeeded in making the Catholic-oriented local paper known beyond the canton's borders. He edited the paper until 1884; his son Hans von Matt-Odermatt was its editor from 1884 to 1923.

In 1876–1877 he had a formative influence on the drafting of the new cantonal constitution of Nidwalden, and in particular he advocated greater support for primary schools. From 1893 to 1897 Nidwalden politics were severely shaken by a dispute over the rate of interest on Gülten (a type of land charge); he tried in vain to settle it by proposing the creation of a fund to redeem them (Gültentilgungskasse). In federal politics, too, he was more concerned with mediating between the parties than with sharpening their differences. He wrote poems, obituaries, and historical essays.

== Bibliography ==
- Nidwaldner Volksblatt, 6 and 13 October 1900
- Nidwaldner Kalender, 42, 1901, 21–24
- 100 Jahre Nidwaldner Volksblatt, 1966
- E. Gruner, Die schweizerische Bundesversammlung 1848–1920, 1, 1966, 340

=== Archives ===
- Kantonsbibliothek Nidwalden, Stans
- Staatsarchiv Nidwalden, Stans
