= Matt =

Matt may refer to:

- Matt (name), people with the given name or surname Matt
- In British English, of a surface: having a non-glossy finish, see gloss (optics)
- Matt, Switzerland, a municipality
- "Matt", the cartoon by Matt Pritchett in the UK Telegraph newspapers
- MATT, gay male erotic artist (born Charles Edward Kerbs)

== See also ==
- Maat (disambiguation)
- Mat (disambiguation)
- Matte (disambiguation)
- Matthew (name)
- Mutt (disambiguation)
