= Isabelle Kaiser =

Swiss writer

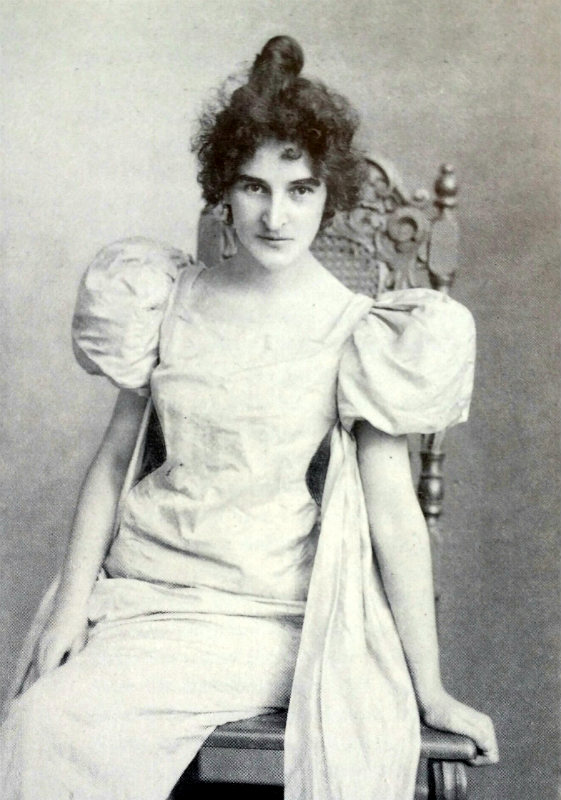
Isabelle Kaiserr, photograph by Johannes Meiner around 1899

Isabelle Kaiser (2 October 1866, in Beckenried – 17 February 1925, in Beckenried) was a Swiss writer who produced works in the French and German languages. She received the prize of the French Academy.

== Works ==
=== French ===
==== Poetry ====
French poems:

- Ici-Bas (1888)
- Sous les étoiles (“Under the stars,” 1890)
- Des ailes (1897)
- Le jardin clos (1912)

==== Novels and stories ====
Other works in French:

- Cœur de femme (“Heart of a woman,”1891)
- Sorcière (1895)
- Héro (1898)
- Notre père qui êtes aux cieux (“Our father who is in heaven,” 1899)
- Vive le roi! (“Long live the king!,” 1903)
- L'Eclair dans la voile (1907)
- Marcienne de Fluë (1909)

=== German ===
Her works in German include:

- Wenn die Sonne untergeht (“When the sun sets,” 1901), a novel
- Mein Herz (“My heart,” 1908), poems
- Die Friedensucherin (“A woman searching for peace,” 1908), a romance
- Der wandernde See (1910)
- Von ewiger Liebe (“On eternal love,” 1913)
