= Mads =

Mads may refer to:

- Mads (given name)
- MADS Theatre, in England
- MADS-box, a family of genes and proteins
- Metadata Authority Description Schema, a schema used in the library community
- Mads (film), a 2024 French film
