= Luzerner Zeitung =

Swiss German-language daily newspaper

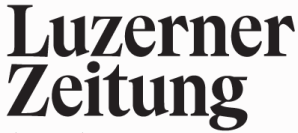
- Type: Daily newspaper
- Owner: CH Media
- Editor-in-chief: Thomas Bornhauser
- Founded: 1996; 30 years ago
- Language: German
- Headquarters: Lucerne
- Country: Switzerland
- Circulation: 127,244 (2009)
- Sister newspapers: Neue Zürcher Zeitung; St. Galler Tagblatt
- ISSN: 1421-7430
- OCLC number: 605736113
- Website: luzernerzeitung.ch (in German)

Luzerner Zeitung (LZ) is a Swiss German-language daily newspaper, published in Lucerne.

== History and profile ==
Luzerner Zeitung was created in 1996 through the merger of Luzerner Zeitung (LZ) and Luzerner Neuste Nachrichten (LNN). Luzerner Zeitung (1991–1996) had replaced the two daily newspapers Luzerner Tagblatt and Vaterland. The paper is owned by CH Media which also owns Neue Zürcher Zeitung and St. Galler Tagblatt. Its editor-in-chief is Thomas Bornhauser.

The newspaper is published in six regional editions:

Regional title	Canton	Website
–	Lucerne	
Neue Nidwaldner Zeitung	Nidwalden	
Neue Obwaldner Zeitung	Obwalden	
Neue Urner Zeitung	Uri	
Zuger Zeitung	Zug	zugerzeitung.ch

In 1997 Neue Luzerner Zeitung had a circulation of 131,761 copies. Its circulation was 133,000 copies in 2003. According to WEMF AG, as of 2004, the newspaper had a certified distribution of 134,526 copies and a readership of 290,000. The 2006 circulation of the paper was 131,004 copies. It was 127,244 copies in 2009.
