= Matt Vitale =

American politician

Member-elect of the Missouri House of Representatives from the 96th district
- Assuming office January 6, 2027
- Succeeding: Brad Christ

Personal details
- Party: Democratic
- Website: Campaign website

Matt Vitale is an American politician of the Missouri Democratic Party who is the representative-elect for the 96th district in the Missouri House of Representatives. He was elected in the 2026 general election. Vitale is an accessibility advocate and civil rights specialist.
