= Hans von Matt-Odermatt =

Swiss politician (1869–1932)

Member of the National Council
- In office 1917–1932

Member of the cantonal government (Regierungsrat) of Nidwalden
- In office 1910–1931

Personal details
- Born: 3 January 1869 Stans, Switzerland
- Died: 22 March 1932 (aged 63) Stans, Switzerland
- Party: Conservative People's Party
- Spouse: Marie Odermatt
- Children: Hans von Matt; Josef von Matt; Leonard von Matt
- Parent: Hans von Matt-Stofer
- Occupation: Newspaper editor

Hans von Matt, also known as Hans von Matt-Odermatt (3 January 1869 – 22 March 1932), was a Swiss Catholic conservative politician and newspaper editor from Nidwalden. He was editor of the Nidwaldner Volksblatt from 1884 to 1923, a member of the cantonal government of Nidwalden from 1910 to 1931, and a member of the National Council from 1917 to 1932. In the 1920s he was one of the leading figures of politically organized Catholicism.

== Biography ==
Hans von Matt was the son of Hans von Matt. He married Marie Odermatt, daughter of Josef Odermatt, a master saddler. His sons included Hans, Josef, and Leonard.

After attending the Gymnasium in Stans from 1881 to 1885, he completed his education with a language stay in Namur, Belgium. In 1886 he joined his father's business, which he ran as its principal owner from 1900 to 1932. At the same time he was editor of the Nidwaldner Volksblatt from 1884 to 1923. In 1923, on the initiative of a group of conservative clergy who considered his reform-Catholic stance insufficiently combative, the paper was sold to the Nidwaldner Volksblatt company (Gesellschaft Nidwaldner Volksblatt).

His political career began with his election to the Nidwalden cantonal parliament (Landrat), of which he was a member from 1898 to 1910 and from 1931 to 1932. He was a member of the cantonal government (Regierungsrat) from 1910 to 1931, presiding over it six times as Landammann between 1920 and 1930, and headed its education department. With his election to the National Council in 1917 he also became active at the federal level, until 1932.

As president of the Catholic Conservative People's Party of Nidwalden (Katholisch-Konservative Volkspartei Nidwaldens) and as secretary (until 1920) and member of the inner party committee of the Conservative People's Party of Switzerland, he was one of the leading figures of politically organized Catholicism in the 1920s. At the federal level he initiated the re-establishment of the Holy See's representation to the Swiss Confederation. In the National Council he chaired the committee on copyright in works of literature and art.

His political work was shaped above all by his extensive legislative activity for his home canton. Although not a lawyer, he drafted a large part of the cantonal laws, among them the cantonal constitution of 1913 and, in particular, the law on aid for uninsured damage caused by natural hazards (Gesetz über die Hilfe bei unversicherten Elementarschäden), which was the first of its kind and served as a model for other cantons.

Von Matt had wide-ranging talents and interests and was also involved in social and cultural matters. He was one of the co-founders of the literary journal Schweizerische Rundschau and supported various social institutions, among them Caritas, the Swiss Association for the Abnormal (Schweizerische Vereinigung für Anormale), Pro Senectute, Pro Juventute, and the St. Anna Association, a Swiss society for the care of the sick and of women in childbed (Schweizerische Gesellschaft für Kranken- und Wöchnerinnenpflege St.-Anna-Verein).

== Bibliography ==
- E. Gruner, Die schweizerische Bundesversammlung 1848–1920, 1, 1966, 340–341
