= Matt Peacock (disambiguation) =

Matt Peacock (1952–2004) was an Australian journalist, writer of Killer Company.

Matt(hew) Peacock can also refer to:

- Matthew Peacock (racehorse trainer) for Dante (1942–1956)
- Matt Peacock, married Jodie Marsh in 2007 as culmination of TV series Totally Jodie Marsh: Who'll Take Her Up the Aisle?
- Matt Peacock (baseball) (born 1994), American professional baseball pitcher
