= Maat (disambiguation) =

Ma'at or Maat is an Egyptian goddess and concept.

Maat or MAAT may also refer to:

- Maat (TV series), Hum TV drama serial
- Maat (rank), naval rank of the German Navy, Kriegsmarine, and Kaiserliche Marine
- Member of the Association of Accounting Technicians
- Maat Kheru, the true intonation with which the dead must recite magical incantations according to Maspus
- Maat Mons, the highest volcano on the planet Venus
- Maat (film), a 2013 Indian Marathi-language drama film
- Museum of Art, Architecture and Technology, also known as MAAT, Lisbon, Portugal

== People ==
- Albert Jan Maat, Dutch politician and member of the European Parliament
- Martin de Maat, teacher and artistic director at the Second City in Chicago

== Languages ==
The word occurs in Afrikaans, Dutch and Frisian where it means "friend" or "measure"; Finnish "lands"; Turkish and Indonesian "check mate"; Arabic مات "dead"; Hindi मत "don't"

== See also ==
- Mat (disambiguation)
- MAT (disambiguation)
- Matt (disambiguation)
- Matte (disambiguation)
- Matthew (name)
