= Josef von Matt (writer) =

Swiss writer (1901–1988)

- Born: 23 September 1901; Stans, Switzerland
- Died: 14 November 1988 (aged 87); Stans, Switzerland
- Occupations: Writer; bookseller; publisher
- Spouse: Agnes Bertha Blättler (m. 1924)
- Father: Hans von Matt-Odermatt
- Relatives: Hans von Matt (brother); Leonard von Matt (brother)
- Awards: Innerschweizer Radiopreis (1961)

Josef von Matt (23 September 1901 – 14 November 1988) was a Swiss writer, bookseller, and publisher from Stans. He wrote plays, poems, and stories in dialect and in Standard German, as well as the lyrics of the Nidwaldner Tanzliedli, which became part of the folk heritage.

== Biography ==
Josef von Matt was the son of Hans von Matt and a brother of Hans and Leonard. In 1924 he married Agnes Bertha Blättler. He attended the Gymnasium in Stans and a commercial school in Saint-Maurice, and worked as a bookseller, publisher, and dealer in antiquarian books.

From 1931 to 1980 he edited the Nidwaldner Kalender, and from 1932 he was editor of the Anzeigeblatt für die katholische Geistlichkeit der deutschsprachigen Schweiz (a gazette for the Catholic clergy of German-speaking Switzerland) in Stans. He also contributed to radio.

He wrote plays (Dr Wilderer, 1931), poems, and stories in dialect and in Standard German (Nidwaldnerchost, 1965; Z'Nidwalde drheime, 1979), as well as the lyrics of the Nidwaldner Tanzliedli, which became part of the folk heritage.

From 1937 to 1943 he was president of the Historical Society of Nidwalden (Historischer Verein von Nidwalden), and from 1952 to 1970 president of the Nidwalden radio section of the Central Swiss Radio and Television Society (Innerschweizer Fernseh- und Radiogesellschaft). In 1961 he received the Central Swiss Radio Prize (Innerschweizer Radiopreis).

== Bibliography ==
- Kosch, Deutsches Literatur-Lexikon, 10, 544
- B. S. Scherer (ed.), Innerschweizer Schriftsteller, 1977, 344
