= Matt Nelson =

Matt Nelson may refer to:

- Matt Nelson (American football) (born 1995), American football player
- Matthew Nelson (musician) (born 1967), American singer-songwriter
- Matthew Nelson (soccer) (born 1977), American soccer goalkeeper
- Matthew Nelson (field hockey) (born 1998), field hockey player from Ireland
- Matt Nelson (protester), a person who protested by self-immolation

See also

- Matheu Nelson (born 1999), American baseball player
- WeRateDogs, a social media brand created in 2015 by Matt Nelson
