= Matt Slocum (disambiguation) =

Matt Slocum (born 1972) is a guitarist, cellist, pianist and composer. It may also refer to the following people:

- Matt Slocum (drummer) (born 1981), American jazz drummer and composer.
- Matt Slocum (keyboardist) (born 1974), keyboardist
