= Matt Brash =

Matt Brash may refer to:

- Matt Brash (veterinarian) (born 1963), British veterinarian
- Matt Brash (baseball) (born 1998), Canadian baseball pitcher
