= Louis Matte =

Canadian ice hockey player and coach

Louis Matte (born June 8, 1972) is a Canadian professional ice hockey coach. He has been serving as assistant coach of Genève-Servette HC in the National League (NL) since 2008. Matte is the twin brother of René Matte who also coaches ice hockey.

== Career ==
Born in Quebec City, Quebec, Matte attended Université Laval from 1992 to 1996, earning a physical education degree. Forced to retire from his playing career at an early age due to injury, Matte turned to coaching. He coached at the youth level in his native province of Québec, before moving to Switzerland in 1997, joining Genève-Servette HC, where he worked in the club's youth setup.

In 2008, he was named assistant coach of Genève-Servette's men's team in the Swiss top-flight National League (NL). Working alongside head coach Chris McSorley, Matte helped win the 2013 and 2014 Spengler Cup.
