= Albert E. Matt =

British composer

Albert Edward Matt (usually credited as Albert E. Matt or only Matt), (20 March 1864 – 7 December 1941) was a British musician, composer and trombone player. The grand march Fame and Glory (Op. 21), which was first published in 1924, is Matt's most famous work. The march is by tradition played first in order at the veterans' march past of the Cenotaph at London Whitehall on Remembrance Day. It was composed by Matt and originally arranged by a certain Charles Godfrey. Remembrance Day commentators sometimes mention the march's title, but never its composer.
