= Melchior Paul von Deschwanden =

Swiss painter (1811–1881)

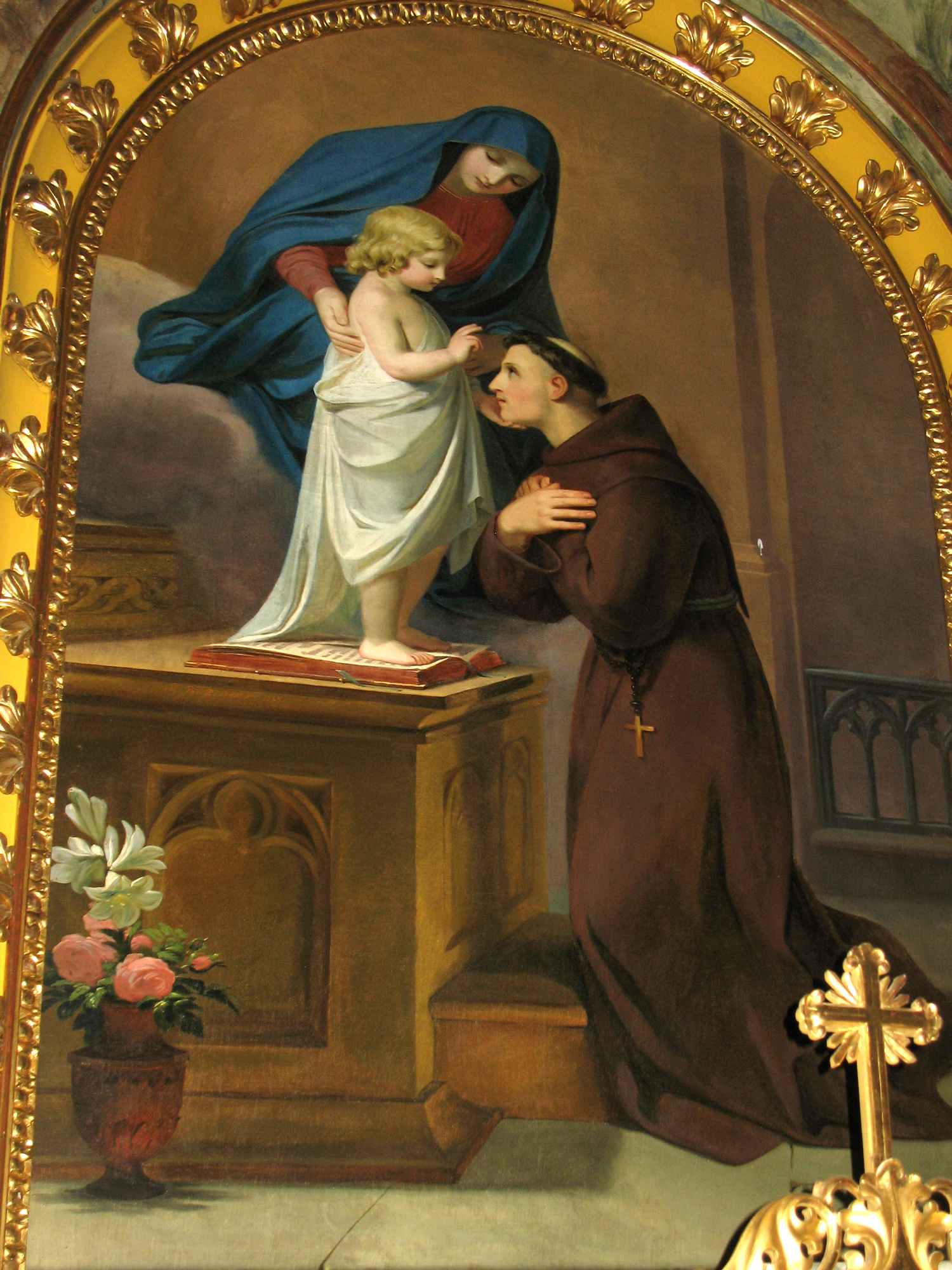
Saint Antony by Deschwanden in Urtijëi

Melchior-Paul von Deschwanden (January 10, 1811 – February 25, 1881) was a Swiss religious painter.

== Early life in Switzerland ==
Deschwanden was born in Stans, in Canton Nidwalden, the son of Johann Baptist Deschwanden and Regina Luthiger. He was Roman Catholic and remained a bachelor.

== Artistic training ==
He studied drawing with Louis Victor von Deschwanden, Johann Kaspar Moos (1825–1826) in Zug, Daniel Albert Freudweiler and Johann Caspar Schinz in Zurich (1827), then he enrolled in the Munich Academy (1830). After going to Lausanne to learn French (1835–1836), he returned home. From 1838 to 1840, he studied at the Florentine Academy where he won first prize for an oil of a male nude. In Florence he was particularly drawn to the works of Fra Angelico.

== Religious painter ==
After a meeting with the Nazarene artist Friedrich Overbeck, he made a conscious decision to devote his life's work to religious painting. After returning to Switzerland finally, he received his first order from an ecclesiastical source, altarpieces for the chapel of St. Peter in Lucerne. In 1842 he met members of the Düsseldorf school of painters and became interested in the work of the Austrian artist Eduard von Steinle, a fashionable religious painter and a Nazarene. In 1845 he discovered in the church of St. Louis in Munich murals by Peter von Cornelius, a classical artist who had been influenced by the Nazarenes, and visited one of his pupils the portrait painter and history painter Wilhelm von Kaulbach. Though himself a portraitist of talent, he devoted more of his time to religious paintings, creating a style of simple understandable compositions, expressive figures and a smooth technique.

Deschwanden is believed to have painted over 2000 works, amongst which the greatest number are altarpieces, and for nearly forty years he dominated religious painting in Switzerland. His works were well received in Catholic and Protestant circles. Consequently, he sent his works all over the world, and examples may be found in churches in Annapolis, Maryland and Covington, Kentucky. His work was widely reproduced in pious chromolithographic reproductions.

One of Deschwanden's depictions of the Adoration of the Magi was hung in the village church of Lewtrenchard, by the Anglican priest Sabine Baring-Gould.

== Pupils ==
Deschwanden is known to have taken many pupils, amongst whom were the fellow artist from Stans Adalbert Baggenstos, and the Swiss-born American painter Adolfo Müller-Ury in whose arms he is documented as dying in February 1881.

== Deschwanden Memorial ==
In the front garden of the former Nidwaldner Kantonalbank in the centre of Stans is a monument by the Swiss sculptor Auguste Stanser Blaesi (1903–1979) that was erected in memory of Deschwanden in the autumn of 1933.
