= Heinrich Danioth =

Swiss painter and poet

- Born: 1 May 1896; Altdorf, Switzerland
- Died: 3 November 1953 (aged 57); Flüelen, Switzerland
- Spouse: Hedi Weber (m. 1932)
- Family: Madeleine Danioth (daughter), Cilly Danioth (daughter)

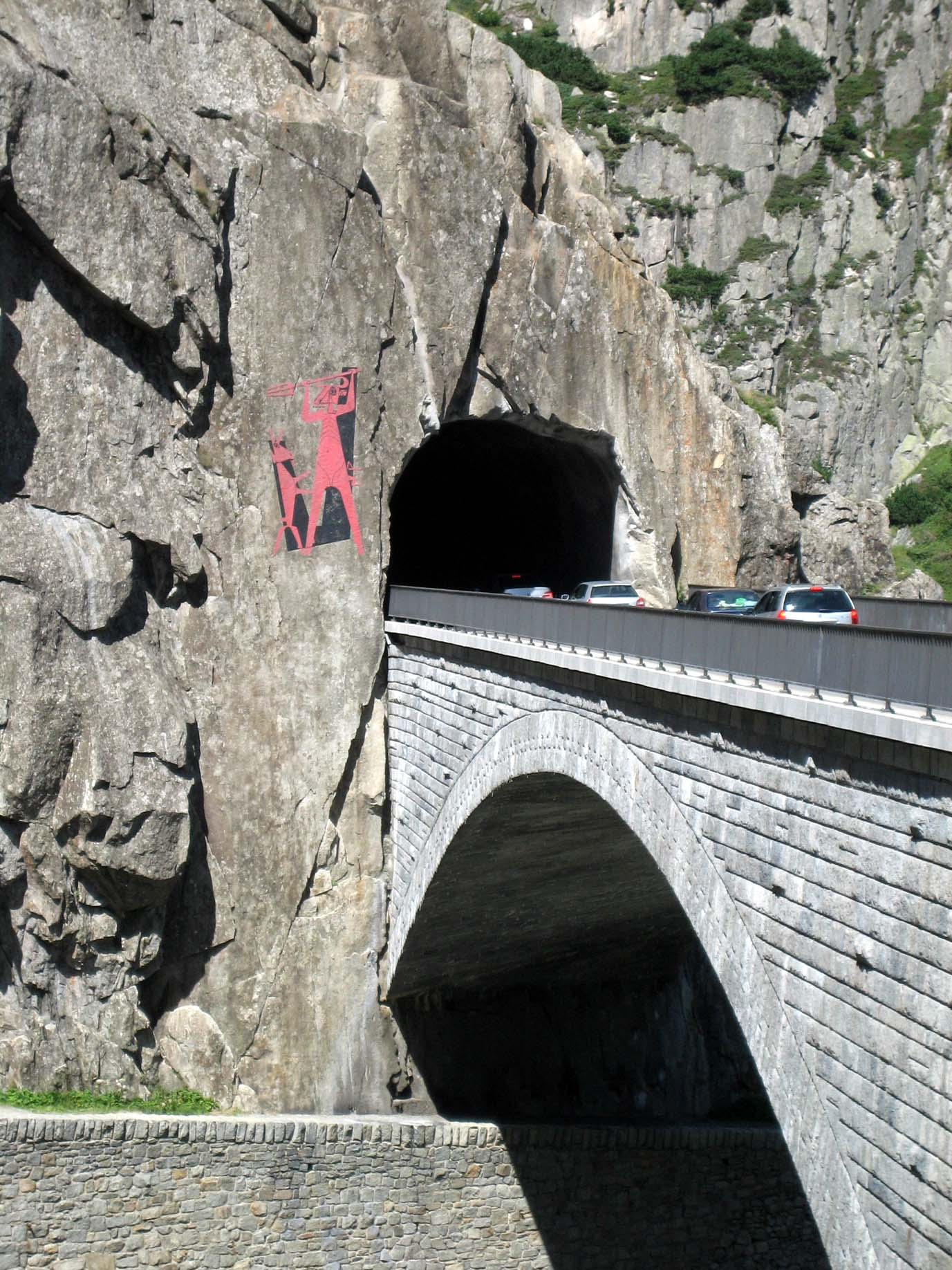
Devil image in the Schöllenen Gorge

Heinrich Danioth (1896–1953) was a Swiss painter and poet.

== Early life ==
Heinrich Danioth was born on 1 May 1896 in Altdorf, Switzerland. In 1912, he received some of his basic artistic training in the Basel studio of fellow artist Rudolf Löw, as well as taking evening courses at the local commercial school.

== Career ==
His career began in 1916 when he started work in the Vaterhaus in Altdorf as a freelance artist in his personal studio. After some time in active service, he gave up a position as a church painter in Upper Valais in 1919 "for artistic reasons of conscience". Throughout 1920-21, he attended the master class of the German expressionist August Babberger at the Baden State Art School in Karlsruhe. Babberger’s work would prove to have a profound influence on his own.

He returned to his native Switzerland in 1927, where he began to introduce Expressionism to the Canton of Uri. In 1929, he took up residence in Flüelen, and in 1931, built his own residential and studio house above Lake Uri. He would work at this location for the rest of his life.

== Notable works ==
=== Paintings ===
Some of Danioth’s most notable works include the murals, "Tellsprung" and "Rütlischwur", on the walls of the Tellspielhaus, an Altdorf theatre, in 1927.

He painted the mural “Fundamentum” in 1936. It is currently located at the Federal Letter Museum, one of three historical museums in Schwyz, Switzerland.

Another notable work is the large-format mural "Föhnwacht", created on behalf of the Federal Art Commission. A sculptor named Hans von Matt initiated the project after calls to decorate the waiting hall of the new SBB station in Flüelen. It took a year for Danioth to design it, as he searched for a suitable topic. Both the new station and the mural were inaugurated in November 1944. It is displayed there to this day.

He is also known for the image of the devil and the goat on the rock face above the Schöllenen. It was re-attached to a new location when the new cantonal road was built (ca. 1958).

=== Poetry ===
Danioth was also active in writing. In addition to detailed diaries, he wrote compilations of short and often humorous verses. Towards the end of his life, purely literary texts were created. Danioth’s most famous poetry work is the "Urner Krippenspiel" from 1945. In 1951, he wrote the radio play The Sixth of the Seven Days. As a result, he was posthumously awarded the Radio Prize of Central Switzerland.

== Personal life ==
Danioth married Hedi Weber in 1932. He had two children, Madeleine and Cilly.

== Death ==
Heinrich Danioth died on 3 November 1953, after a failed operation to remove a brain tumor.

== Legacy ==
The works of Danioth were shown at the Kunstmuseum Luzern from 17 October—24 November 1954.

The Swiss director Felice Zenoni portrayed Heinrich Danioth's life and work in Danioth the Devil Painter (German: Danioth: Der Teufelsmaler), a documentary film starring actor Hanspeter Müller-Drossaart as Danioth. The film was released in Switzerland on January 15, 2015.
