= René Matte (ice hockey) =

Canadian professional ice hockey coach and executive

René Matte (born June 8, 1972 in Quebec City, Quebec) is a Canadian professional ice hockey coach and executive. His twin brother Louis is also coaching.

== Coaching career ==
A native of Val-Bélair, Matte coached the Gouverneurs de Sainte-Foy (midget AAA) in his home province of Québec, before serving as assistant coach of the Remparts de Québec (LHJMQ) from 2000 to 2002. He then took the same position at fellow LHJMQ side Saguenéens de Chicoutimi. He was promoted to head coach during the 2002-03 season and relieved of his duties the following season in November 2003. In the 2004–05 and 2005-06 seasons, he served as assistant coach on the Cataractes de Shawinigan's coaching staff.

In 2006, Matte moved to Switzerland, accepting the assistant coach position at HC Fribourg-Gottéron of the top-flight National League A (NLA). During his five-year assistant coach tenure, he served as head coach on an interim basis twice. In June 2015, he moved from assistant coach to assistant sports director, especially working in youth development. He later worked as a pundit for the Swiss TV channel RTS.

On July 4, 2017, he took the job as assistant coach at Swiss NLA side HC Ambrì-Piotta.
