= Vaterland (newspaper) =

Catholic conservative newspaper in Lucerne

- Type: Daily newspaper
- Founder(s): Josef Duret and others
- Publisher: Räber (1871–1959); Maihof (1959–1991)
- Language: German
- Headquarters: Lucerne
- Country: Switzerland

Vaterland was a Catholic conservative daily newspaper published in Lucerne, Switzerland, from 1871 to 1991. The newspaper first appeared on 1 October 1871 as the successor to the Luzerner Zeitung, which had been published since 1833 by the Räber printing house. In 1991, it merged with the Luzerner Tagblatt to form the Luzerner Zeitung.

== History ==
The newspaper was founded by a group that included episcopal chancellor Josef Duret. The founders intended to give the newspaper a supraregional importance, though it never achieved this goal. In 1939, three-quarters of its readership was based in Lucerne.

Vaterland served as the mouthpiece of the conservative-majority cantonal government. For several decades, its board of directors was presided over by a member of the Cantonal Council: Heinrich Walther from 1919 to 1947, and Emil Emmenegger from 1947 to 1968.

The newspaper was printed by Räber until 1959, after which it operated its own printing house in Maihof. In 1991, Vaterland merged with its former rival, the radical newspaper Luzerner Tagblatt, to form the Luzerner Zeitung.

== Bibliography ==
- Huber, Max. Geschichte der politischen Presse im Kanton Luzern 1914-1945. 1989.
- Suter, K. Pressegeschichte des Kantons Luzern von 1945 bis 1970. 1996.
- Luginbühl, D. Vom "Zentralorgan" zur unabhängigen Tageszeitung? Das "Vaterland" und die CVP 1955-1991. 2007.
