= Schweizerischer Werkbund =

Schweizerischer Werkbund, (translated as Swiss Werkbund) is a Swiss association of artists, architects, designers, and industrialists established in 1913, inspired by the mission of the Deutscher Werkbund.

The Werkbund was founded on 17 May 1913 by different actors of the arts, architecture, advertisement, industry and politics at the Kunstgewerbemuseum in Zurich. This meeting was called by Alfred Altherr.

The Werkbund hosted meetings, lectures, and exhibitions. The Werkbund created a film to publicize the very first Swiss housing exhibition held within Belgium. The exhibition was known as WOBA. They also published a monthly journal titled, Das Werk.

The instigation of the die Gut Forme campaign after World War II was the responsibility of the Werkbund. The campaign sought to proliferate the aims and ideals of the functionalism movement, and continued from sometime during 1949 to its closure sometime during 1969.
