= Mats (given name) =

- Languages: Swedish, Norwegian, Estonian
- Name day: 24 February (Sweden, Estonia and Norway)

Other names
- Related names: Matthew, Matthias, Mati, Madi, Mäido, Maido, Maidu, Mait, Matis, Matti, Mads

Mats is a given name, a Scandinavian and Estonian form of Matthew or Matthias, and may refer to:

- Mats Berglind (1952–2016), Swedish politician
- Mats Berglund (born 1970), Swedish politician
- Mats Bergman (born 1948), Swedish actor
- Mats Eilertsen (born 1975), Norwegian jazz musician and composer
- Mats Ekman (1865–1934), Estonian poet
- Mats Engman (born 1954), Swedish Air Force major general
- Mats Frøshaug (born 1988), Norwegian ice hockey player
- Mats Gren (born 1963), Swedish footballer and coach
- Mats Grorud (born 1976), Norwegian director and animator
- Mats Gustafsson (born 1964), Swedish saxophone player
- Mats Haakenstad (born 1993), Norwegian footballer
- Mats Hellström (1942–2026), Swedish politician
- Mats Hinze (born 1970), Swedish far right-wing anarchist and attempted bomber
- Mats Hummels (born 1988), German footballer
- Mats Johansson (1951–2017), Swedish journalist and politician
- Mats Jonsson (born 1957), Swedish rally driver
- Mats André Kaland (born 1989), Norwegian footballer
- Mats Kettilmundsson (ca. 1280–1326), Swedish knight, riksdrots and statesman
- Mats Kirkebirkeland (born 1989), Norwegian politician
- Mats Knoester (born 1998), Dutch footballer
- Mats Laarmann (1873–1964), Estonian politician
- Mats Lanner (born 1961), Swedish golfer
- Mats Lidström (born 1959), Swedish cellist, chamber musician, composer, teacher and publisher
- Mats Lillebo (born 1994), Norwegian footballer
- Mats Magnusson (born 1963), Swedish footballer
- Mats Møller Dæhli (born 1995), Norwegian footballer
- Mats Moraing (born 1992), German tennis player
- Mats Mõtslane (1884–1956), Estonian writer and politician
- Mats G. Nilsson (born 1968), Swedish politician
- Mats Nilsson (born 1983), Swedish grappler and mixed martial artist
- Mats Nilsson (born 1956), Swedish Air Force officer
- Mats Nõges (1879–1973), Estonian physician, editor and politician
- Mats Odell (born 1947), Swedish politician
- Mats Rosseli Olsen (born 1991), Norwegian ice hockey player
- Mats Paulson (1938–2021), Swedish singer and songwriter
- Mats Persson (consultant), (born 1978), Swedish consultant and journalist
- Mats Persson, (born 1980), Swedish politician
- Mats Pertoft (born 1954), Swedish politician
- Mats Ronander (born 1954), Swedish rock musician
- Mats Rondin (1960–2014), Swedish cellist and conductor
- Mats Söderlund (born 1967), Swedish singer
- Mats Solheim (born 1987), Norwegian footballer
- Mats Sundin (born 1971), Swedish ice hockey player
- Mats Thornes (born 2002), Norwegian footballer
- Mats Traat (1936–2022), Estonian poet and author
- Mats Wahl (1945–2025), Swedish author and dramatist
- Mats Wallberg (born 1949), Swedish ice speed skater
- Mats Waltin (born 1953), Swedish ice hockey player
- Mats Welff (born 1947), Swedish Army major general
- Mats Wieffer (born 1999), Dutch footballer
- Mats Wiking (born 1961), Swedish politician
- Mats Wilander (born 1964), Swedish tennis player
- Mats Zuccarello (born 1987), Norwegian ice hockey player

== See also ==
- Matthew (given name)
- MATS (disambiguation)
