= Metković (disambiguation) =

Metković is a city in the Dubrovnik-Neretva County of Croatia.

Metković may also refer to:

- RK Metković (Rukometni Klub Metković) is a handball club from Metković, Croatia.
- Mačvanski Metković, a village near Bogatić, Serbia
- Pocerski Metković, a village near Šabac, Serbia

== See also ==
- Matković, a Serbo-Croatian surname
