= Madis =

Male given name

- Gender: Male
- Language: Estonian
- Name day: 24 February

Origin
- Region of origin: Estonia

Other names
- Related names: Mati, Mattias, Madi, Mäido, Maido, Maidu, Mait, Matis, Mats, Matti

Madis is an Estonian masculine given name. As of 1 January 2020, 2,635 men in Estonia bear the name Madis. It is the 53rd most popular male name in Estonia.

Notable Estonian people named Madis include:

- Madis Aruja (1936–1995), Estonian conservationist, geographer and ski-orienteer
- Madis Kallas (born 1981), Estonian decathlete
- Madis Kalmet (born 1955), Estonian actor and theatre director
- Madis Kõiv (1929–2014), Estonian writer, philosopher and physicist
- Madis Laiv (born 1937), Estonian racing driver
- Madis Lepajõe (1955–2020), Estonian cyclist, sport figure and politician
- Madis Mihkels (born 2003), Estonian racing cyclist
- Madis Milling (1970–2022), Estonian actor, television and radio presenter and politician
- Madis Pärtel (born 1985), Estonian volleyball player
- Madis Timpson (born 1974), is an Estonian politician, lawyer, and civil servant
- Madis Üürike (born 1943), Estonian politician and financial expert
- Madis Vihmann (born 1995), Estonian football player

Madis may refer to:

- Madis (born 1987), Polish composer and electronic music producer
- Marine Air Defense Integrated System (MADIS), Short-range surface-to-air shoot-on-the-move air defense weapon on atop a Joint Light Tactical Vehicle (JLTV)
