= Matthew (given name) =

English language male given name

- Pronunciation: /ˈmæθ.juː/
- Gender: Masculine

Origin
- Origin: Hebrew
- Meaning: "Gift of God"

Other names
- Alternative spelling: Mathew, Mathews
- Nicknames: Matt, Matty
- Popularity: see popular names

Matthew is an English language masculine given name. It ultimately derives from the Hebrew name "מַתִּתְיָהוּ" (Matityahu).

== Etymology ==
The Hebrew name מַתִּתְיָהוּ (Matityahu) was transliterated into Greek as Ματταθίας (Mattathias). It was subsequently superseded by Ματθαῖος (Matthaios); this was Latinised as Matthaeus, which became Matthew in English. The popularity of the name is due to Matthew the Apostle, one of the twelve apostles of Jesus and the traditional author of the Gospel of Matthew.

Maiú and Maidiú were both a borrowing of the name Matthew among the Anglo-Normans settlers in Ireland. Maitiú is the most common Irish form of the name. Matthew is also used as an anglicisation of the Irish name Mathúin (meaning 'bear').

== Popularity ==
The name Matthew became popular during the Middle Ages in Northwest Europe, and has been very common throughout the English-speaking world.

In Ireland, Matthew was ranked the 10th most popular male name in 2007. In 2008, it was ranked 15th, falling to 20th between 2009-2010, and then 24th between 2011-2012. In 2016, it was the 30th most popular male name in Ireland, rising to 26th in 2017.

In the United Kingdom, Matthew has been among the 10 most popular male names. Matthew has been in the top 2,000 most popular male names in Australia, Canada and the United States.

== Variations ==
- Maciej
- Madis
- Mads
- Maitiú
- Máté
- Matei
- Matej
- Matěj
- Mateja
- Mateo
- Mateu
- Mateus
- Mateusz
- Matevž
- Matas
- Matha
- Mathai
- Matthei
- Matheus
- Mathias
- Mathieu
- Mathis
- Mathus
- Matias
- Matías
- Matija
- Matīss
- Matko
- Matouš
- Matúš
- Mats
- Matt
- Matteo
- Matthaeus
- Matthaios
- Matthias
- Matthieu
- Matthijs
- Matti
- Mattie
- Mattia
- Mattias
- Mattis
- Matty
- Matvei (Matfei, Matfey)
- Mathew
- Mattheo

== Surnames ==
A number of surnames are derived from the name in different languages:

== See also ==
- List of people with given name Matthew
