= Wasama =

Surname list

Wasama is a Finnish surname. Notable people with the surname include:

- Jarmo Wasama (1943–1966), Finnish ice hockey player
- Matti Wasama (1918–1970), Finnish ice hockey player
