= Matti (given name) =

Matti is a given name, originated from the Hebrew Mattityahu, meaning "gift of God". It is a popular Finnish version of Matthew or Matthias. Matti (מתי) is also a short for the Yiddish Mattisyahu. It may refer to:

== In sports ==
- Matti Breschel (born 1984), Danish road bicycle racer
- Matti Hagman (1955–2016), Finnish hockey player
- Matti Hamberg (1932–2025), Finnish speed skater
- Matti Hautamäki (born 1981), Finnish ski jumper
- Matti Jutila (1932–2025), Finnish-born Canadian Olympic wrestler
- Matti Killing (born 1948), Estonian rowing coach
- Matti Klinga (born 1994), Finnish footballer
- Matti Mäki (born 1982), Finnish swimmer
- Matti Niemi (athlete) (born 1976), Finnish hurdler
- Matti Niemi (rowing) (born 1937), Finnish coxswain
- Matti Nuutinen (born 1990), Finnish basketball player
- Matti Nykänen (1963–2019), Finnish ski jumper
- Matti Oivanen (born 1986), Finnish volleyball player
- Matti Pitkänen (born 1948), Finnish former cross-country skier
- Matti Rajakylä (born 1984), Finnish swimmer
- Matti Santahuhta (born 1981), Finnish football manager and former player
- Matti Wasama (1918–1970), Finnish hockey player

== In music ==
- Matti Caspi (1949–2026), Israeli composer, musician, singer and lyricist
- Matti Kärki (born 1972), Swedish death metal vocalist
- Mátti Kovler (born 1980), Israeli/American composer of music theatre
- Matti Lehtinen (1922–2022), Finnish operatic baritone
- Matti Salminen (born 1945), Finnish operatic bass singer

== In politics ==
- Matti Hannola (born 1939), Finnish farmer and politician
- Matti Kuusimäki (born 1943), Finnish lawyer
- Matti Lonkainen (1874–1918), Finnish politician
- Matti Maasikas (born 1967), Estonian diplomat
- Matti Mattson (1916–2011), American labor organizer, social activist, veteran of the Spanish Civil War
- Matti Miikki (1889–1960), Finnish farmer and politician
- Matti Nikki, Finnish software developer, researcher and Internet anti-censorship activist
- Matti Päts (1933–2024), Estonian politician
- Matti Turkia (1871–1946), Finnish politician
- Matti Vanhanen (born 1955), Finnish politician and former Prime Minister of Finland

== In other fields ==
- Matti Aarnio (1901–1984), Finnish military officer
- Matti Friedman, Israeli-Canadian journalist and author
- Matti Haapoja (1845–1895), Finnish serial killer
- Matti Jutila (1943–2026), Finnish mathematician and academic
- Matti Klinge (1936–2023), Finnish historian
- Matti Kuusela (born 1956), Finnish journalist
- Matti Kuusi (1914–1998), Finnish folklorist, paremiographer and paremiologist
- Matti Pohto (1817–1857), Finnish book collector
- Matti Saari (1986–2008), perpetrator of the Kauhajoki school shooting
- Matti Seppälä (1941–2020), Finnish geomorphologist
- Matti Åkerblom (1740–1819), Finnish church builder

== See also ==
- Vesa-Matti Loiri, Finnish actor, musician and comedian
- Mati (disambiguation)
