= Matīss =

Matīss is a Latvian given name and surname, the Latvian form of Matthew. Matīss was the 46th most popular baby boy name in Latvia in 2020, falling from 33rd in 2015 and 25th in 2000–2010. Notable people with the name include:

- Matīss Akuraters (born 1982), Latvian percussionist
- Matīss Kivlenieks (1996–2021), Latvian ice hockey goaltender
- Matīss Burģis (born 1989), Latvian table tennis player
- Matīss Kulačkovskis (born 1997), Latvian basketball player
- Anrijs Matīss (born 1973), Latvian politician and former Minister for Transport of Latvia
