= Hannola =

Hannola is a Finnish surname. Notable people with the surname include:

- Matti Hannola (born 1939), Finnish farmer and politician
- Pyry Hannola (born 2001), Finnish footballer

== See also ==
- Hannoa
