= Mathieu =

Mathieu is both a surname and a given name. Notable people with the name include:

== Surname ==
- André Mathieu (1929–1968), Canadian pianist and composer
- Anselme Mathieu (1828–1895), French Provençal poet
- Claude-Louis Mathieu (1783–1875), French mathematician and astronomer
- Émile Léonard Mathieu (1835–1890), French mathematician
- Frédéric Mathieu (born 1977), French politician
- Gail D. Mathieu, United States ambassador to Namibia
- Georges Mathieu (1921–2012), French painter
- Henriette Mathieu-Faraggi (1915–1985), French nuclear physicist
- Jérémy Mathieu (born 1983), French footballer
- Luc Mathieu (born 1972), French journalist
- Marie-Alexandrine Mathieu (1838–1908), French artist known for her etchings
- Michel Mathieu (disambiguation), multiple people, including:
  - Michel Mathieu (Canadian politician) (1838–1916), Canadian politician
  - Michel Mathieu (French politician) (1944–2010), French diplomat
- Mireille Mathieu (born 1946), French singer
- Paul-Henri Mathieu (born 1982), French tennis player
- Simonne Mathieu (1908–1980), French tennis player
- Tyrann Mathieu (born 1992), American football player
- W. A. Mathieu (born 1937), composer, musician, and educator

== Given name ==
- Mathieu Amalric (born 1965), French actor and filmmaker
- Mathieu Bablet (born 1987), French comics creator
- Mathieu Beaudoin (born 1984), Canadian ice hockey player
- Mathieu Beaudoin (Canadian football) (born 1974), Canadian football player
- Mathieu Betts (born 1995), Canadian-American football player
- Mathieu Biron (born 1980), Canadian hockey defenceman
- Mathieu Bois (born 1988), Canadian breaststroke swimmer
- Mathieu Debuchy (born 1985), French footballer
- Mathieu Flamini (born 1984), French footballer
- Mathieu "ZywOo" Herbaut (born 2000), French Counter-Strike player
- Mathieu Kassovitz (born 1967), French director, screenwriter, producer, editor, and actor
- Mathieu Kérékou (1933–2015), President of Benin
- Mathieu Kingsbury (born 1985), Canadian racing driver
- Mathieu Lafon (born 1984), French footballer
- Mathieu Ladagnous (born 1984), French road racing cyclist
- Mathieu Lavoie, Canadian politician in Quebec
- Mathieu Lemay, Canadian politician in Quebec
- Mathieu Lelièvre (born 2005), Canadian sledge hockey player
- Mathieu Montcourt (1985–2009), French tennis player
- Mathieu de Montmorency (1767–1826), French statesman during the French Revolution
- Mathieu Orfila (1787–1853), Spanish-born French toxicologist and chemist
- Mathieu van der Poel (born 1995), Dutch cyclist
- Mathieu Raynal (born 1981) French rugby union referee
- Mathieu Schneider (born 1969), American hockey defenseman
- Mathieu Valbuena (born 1984), French footballer

== See also ==
- Matthieu
- Matthew (name)
- Mathieu function, special function useful for treating a variety of interesting problems in applied mathematics
- Mathieu transformation, subgroup of canonical transformations in classical mechanics.
- Mathieu groups, a family of five sporadic simple groups
