= Matthai =

Matthäi, Matthai are surnames of several origins, all related to local rendering of Matthew. "Matthäi" may also be rendered as Matthaei. Notable people with the surname include:

- Friedrich Matthäi (1777–1845), German painter
- George Matthai (1887–1947), Indian zoologist
- John Matthai (1886–1959), Indian economist
- John Matthai (civil servant), Indian former Chief Secretary of Kerala
- Pallithanam Luca Matthai (1880–1962), Indian agriculturalist
- Ravi J. Matthai (1927–1984), Indian scholar
- Sigrid Matthäi, birth name of Sigrid Schmidt (born 1930), German folklorist
