= Matti Saari =

Matti Saari may refer to:

- Matti Saari (fl. 2009), editor-in-chief of the Finnish family magazine Apu
- Matti Juhani Saari (1986–2008), perpetrator of the Kauhajoki school shooting

== See also ==
- Matti (given name), a Finnish version of the name Matthew
- Saari, a Finnish locality
