= Mattie (name) =

Mattie is a unisex given name. It is often used as a nickname for other names.

== People ==
- Mattie Blaylock (1850–1888), common-law wife of the American lawman Wyatt Earp
- Mattie Moss Clark (1925–1994), American gospel choir director and mother of the Clark Sisters gospel group
- Mattie Curry (1924–1964), Canadian missionary
- Mattie Belle Davis (1910–2004), American judge
- Mattie Daughtry, American politician elected to the Maine House of Representatives in 2012
- Mattie Delaney, American delta blues singer and guitarist
- Mattie Donnelly (hurler), Irish hurler
- Mattie Do, Laotian-American film director
- Mattie Donnelly (Gaelic footballer), Irish Gaelic football player
- Mattie Forde, Irish Gaelic footballer
- Mattie Griffith Browne (c. 1825–1906), American suffragist
- Mattie Hunter (born 1954), American politician
- Mattie Kenny (born 1964), Irish former hurler and manager
- Mattie McDonagh (1936–2005), Gaelic footballer
- Mattie McGrath (born 1958), Irish politician
- Mattie Murphy, Irish hurling manager and former player, the latter in the 1970s and '80s
- Mattie Clyburn Rice, African-American member of the United Daughters of the Confederacy
- Mattie Stepanek (1990–2004), American poet and peace advocate

== Fictional characters ==
- Mattie Franklin, a Marvel Comics superhero
- Mattie Ross, a character in the novel True Grit and the film adaptations
- Mattie Silver, in the novel Ethan Frome
- Mattie Storin, in the British television series House of Cards
- Mattie Jensen, in the Nancy Drew book and HerInteractive PC game Stay Tuned for Danger

== Surname ==
- Jamie Mattie (born 1980), Canadian-born Austrian ice hockey defenceman

== See also ==
- Matty (name)
- Matti (given name)
