= Mathai =

Mathai (Malayalam: മത്തായി) is a given name or surname, usually the Malayalam variant of Matthew, and may refer to:

- Mathai (singer) (Sharon Mathai, born 1992), a contestant on season two of American TV series The Voice
- Mathai Joseph, Indian computer scientist
- Mathai Manjooran, Indian freedom fighter from Kerala
- A. M. Mathai (1935–2025), mathematician
- M. O. Mathai, Special assistant of the Prime Minister of India Jawaharlal Nehru
- Ranjan Mathai
- Varghese Mathai, mathematician and an Australian Research Council Senior Research Fellow at the University of Adelaide
- Wanjira Mathai (born 1971), Kenyan environmentalist

== See also ==
- Matthew (name)
- Matthai
