= Mateus (name) =

Mateus is a Portuguese given name and surname, equivalent to the English Matthew. Notable people with the name include:

== Given name ==
- Mateus (ambassador), Armenian ambassador of Emperor Dawit II of Ethiopia
- Mateus Aleluia (born 1943), Brazilian musician and ethnomusicologist
- Mateus Alves (born 2001), Brazilian tennis player
- Mateus dos Anjos (born 1983), Brazilian footballer
- Mateus Asato (born 1993), Brazilian guitarist
- Mateus Soares de Azevedo (born 1959), Brazilian historian
- Mateus de Oliveira Barbosa (born 1987), Brazilian footballer
- Mateus Borelli (born 1993), Brazilian footballer
- Mateus Garcia Borges (born 1983), Brazilian footballer
- Mateus Caramelo (1994-2016), Brazilian footballer
- Mateus Evangelista Cardoso (born 1994), Brazilian athlete
- Mateus dos Santos Castro (born 1994), Brazilian footballer
- Mateus Costa, Indian football head coach
- Mateus Galiano da Costa (born 1984), Angolan footballer
- Mateus Lima Cruz (born 1993), Brazilian footballer
- Mateus Fernandes (died 1515), Portuguese architect
- Mateus Fonseca (born 1993), Portuguese footballer
- Mateus Alberto Contreiras Gonçalves (born 1983), Angolan footballer
- Mateus Gregório (born 1993), Brazilian weightlifter
- Mateus Alonso Honorio (born 1983), Brazilian footballer
- Mateus Facho Inocêncio (born 1981), Brazilian athlete
- Mateus de Brito Júnior, Angolan minister
- Mateus Versolato Júnior (born 1983), Brazilian goalkeeper
- Mateus Levendi (born 1993), Albanian footballer
- Mateus Lopes (born 1975), Cape Verdean footballer
- Mateus Müller de Souza Lopes (born 1995), Brazilian footballer
- Mateus Alves Maciel (born 1988), Brazilian footballer
- Mateus Gonçalves Martins (born 1994), Brazilian footballer
- Mateus da Costa Meira (born 1975), perpetrator of the 1999 Morumbi Shopping shooting
- Mateus Moreira (died 1645), Brazilian Catholic martyr
- Mateus Norton (born 1996), Brazilian footballer
- Mateus Vicente de Oliveira (1706-1786), Portuguese architect
- Mateus Paraná (born 1987), Brazilian football striker
- Mateus Pasinato (born 1992), Brazilian goalkeeper
- Mateus Mendes Ferreira Pires (born 1992), Brazilian footballer
- Mateus Meira Rita, São Toméan politician
- Mateus de Sá (born 1995), Brazilian athlete
- Mateus Shkreta (born 1994), Albanian footballer
- Mateus da Silva (born 1991), Brazilian footballer
- Mateus de Oliveira Silva (born 1994), Brazilian football midfielder
- Mateus Ferreira da Silva (born 1995), Brazilian footballer
- Mateus Solano (born 1981), Brazilian actor
- Mateus Feliciano Augusto Tomás (1958-2010), Angolan Roman Catholic bishop
- Mateus Uribe (born 1991), Colombian professional footballer
- Mateus Vital (born 1998), Brazilian footballer
- Mateus Viveiros (born 1966), Brazilian football player
- Mateus Ward (born 1999), American actor
- Mateus de Oliveira Xavier (1858-1929), Portuguese Roman Catholic Diocese

== Surname ==
- David Mateus (born 1980), Portuguese rugby union footballer
- Diogo Mateus (born 1980), Portuguese rugby union footballer
- Octávio Mateus (born 1975), Portuguese dinosaur paleontologist and biologist

== See also ==
- Matheus
- Matthias
