= Toppolanmäki =

Archaeological site in Valkeakoski, Finland

Toppolanmäki is an Iron Age cemetery and prominent archaeological site in Valkeakoski, Finland. It was first discovered in 1930s, when gravel was being taken from the area and at least ten burials were destroyed in the process. Since then, the site has been excavated in 1936, 1937, 1951, 2017 and 2018, revealing burials of 15 individuals. Based on the finds and radiocarbon datings, the cemetery was used in the Crusade Period (1050–1150). According to pollen and spore analysis, mosses were used as linings in coffins and grave pits at the site. The juniper remains found from the graves may suggest that the Early Medieval landscape around Toppolanmäki was more open than today and consisted of grassy meadows and juniper bushes.

== Ancient DNA results ==
Grave No. 3 was first excavated by Sakari Pälsi in 1936 revealing bones of a single individual. As the burial was without any other finds, the grave was documented by drawing and filled with the bones left untouched. In 2017, the grave was reopened for further studies by Ulla Moilanen and the bones were taken for testing. Osteological analysis revealed that the bones belonged to a man, who was around 40–50 years old at the time of death. Based on the extracted DNA, that was tested in Germany, the individual had Y-chromosome DNA haplogroup N-M178.

== See also ==
- Levänluhta
