= Akuraters =

Akuraters is a surname. Notable people with the surname include:

- Jānis Akuraters (1876–1937), Latvian poet, writer, playwright, and politician
- Matīss Akuraters (born 1982), Latvian musician
