= Anna B. Eckstein =

German pacifist (1868–1947)

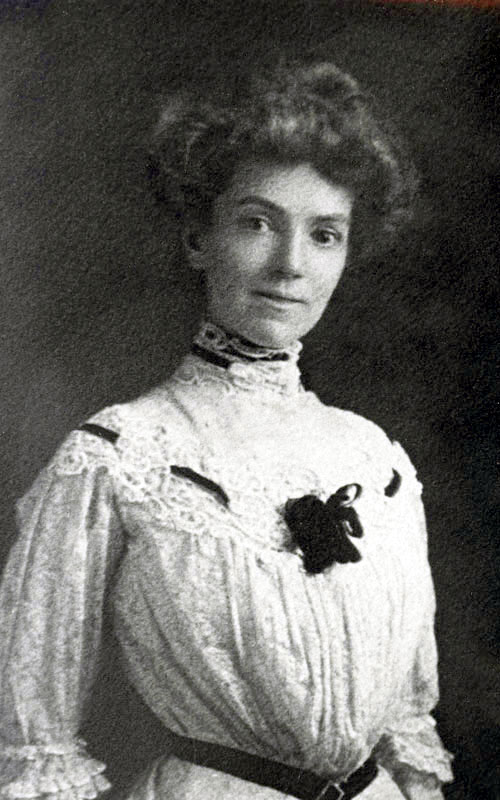
- Eckstein c. 1907
- Born: Bernhardine Anna Eckstein; 14 June 1868; Coburg, Saxe-Coburg and Gotha, North German Confederation
- Died: 16 October 1947 (aged 79); Coburg, American zone, Occupied Germany
- Known for: Peace activism

Anna Bernhardine Eckstein (14 June 1868 – 16 October 1947) was a German champion of world peace, who trained as a teacher and campaigned for peace across the world. She gathered six million signatures on a petition and, in 1913, was nominated for the Nobel Peace Prize. The outbreak of the First World War interrupted her plans but her ideas influenced the Kellogg–Briand Pact of 1928.

== Early life ==
Eckstein was born on 14 June 1868 in Coburg to Johann Nikolaus Eckstein and Anna Barbara Eckstein, née Götz. Her father was a porter and assistant telegraphist at the Werra-Eisenbahn-Gesellschaft, a railway company. Eckstein had a younger brother named Ernst and an older sister named Antonie (Toni), who was born with a disability. Financial reasons limited her formal education to attending a girls' school from 1874 to 1882. However, Eckstein's teacher Ottilie Frese supported her in learning English and French, which made her want to become a teacher herself. She was confirmed in the main church of Coburg in 1882.

At the age of 16, in September 1884, Eckstein left Germany to visit relatives in New York. The reasons for this are unclear. Her parents might have wanted to prevent her from forming a relationship with an aristocrat who was out of her range, or it was to support her teaching career. For the first few years she worked as a maid or teacher at various places and then took on a job as a private teacher for the daughter (Mamie) of a Jewish merchant (Godfrey Mannheimer) who had immigrated from Germany. While working in this household from December 1887 to October 1893 she joined the Mannheimer family on three trips to Germany.

== Peace activism ==
Dressed in white in Vienna in 1911

Eckstein moved to Boston in 1894, at first living with the novelist Martha "Mattie" Griffith Browne and still working as a teacher. In response to her disappointment at the outcomes of the Hague Conventions she joined the American Peace Society, of which she became vice president between 1905 and 1911. She collected over one million signatures, signed by supporters from the US, UK, and Germany, for a proposal she had written prior to the second peace conference in The Hague. On 4 July 1907 she handed this document to the chairman of the conference. Since Eckstein did not see the treaties of this second conference as a success, she organised her own version funded by her own money. She went on to collect six million signatures which she planned to present at the third Hague peace conference in 1914 but the outbreak of the First World War prevented this. This setback caused her to suffer a breakdown but her ideas eventually influenced the Kellogg–Briand Pact of 1928.

With the support of the American publisher Edwin Ginn, Eckstein travelled through Canada and Europe to promote her ideas. In 1909, Eckstein attended the second National Peace Congress in Chicago, USA, where she read a "World Petition to the Third Hague Conference". The same year, she moved back to her birthplace Coburg. From there she continued to travel to most European countries, and also Australia, New Zealand, Japan, and China, where she gained increasing support for her cause. She used to wear white dresses as a symbol of peace. Amongst others, Eckstein worked with Bertha von Suttner, Alfred Hermann Fried, Ludwig Quidde, and Jean Jaurès. Especially in France and Germany, she also had to deal with opposition and criticism, but was nevertheless nominated for the Nobel Peace Prize in 1913.

== World War I ==
During the First World War, Eckstein wrote articles for a magazine on international law, whose editor was the German expert for international law, Theodor Niemeyer. She also published the book Staatenschutzvertrag zur Sicherung des Weltfriedens (State Protection Treaty to Preserve World Peace).

== Later life and death ==
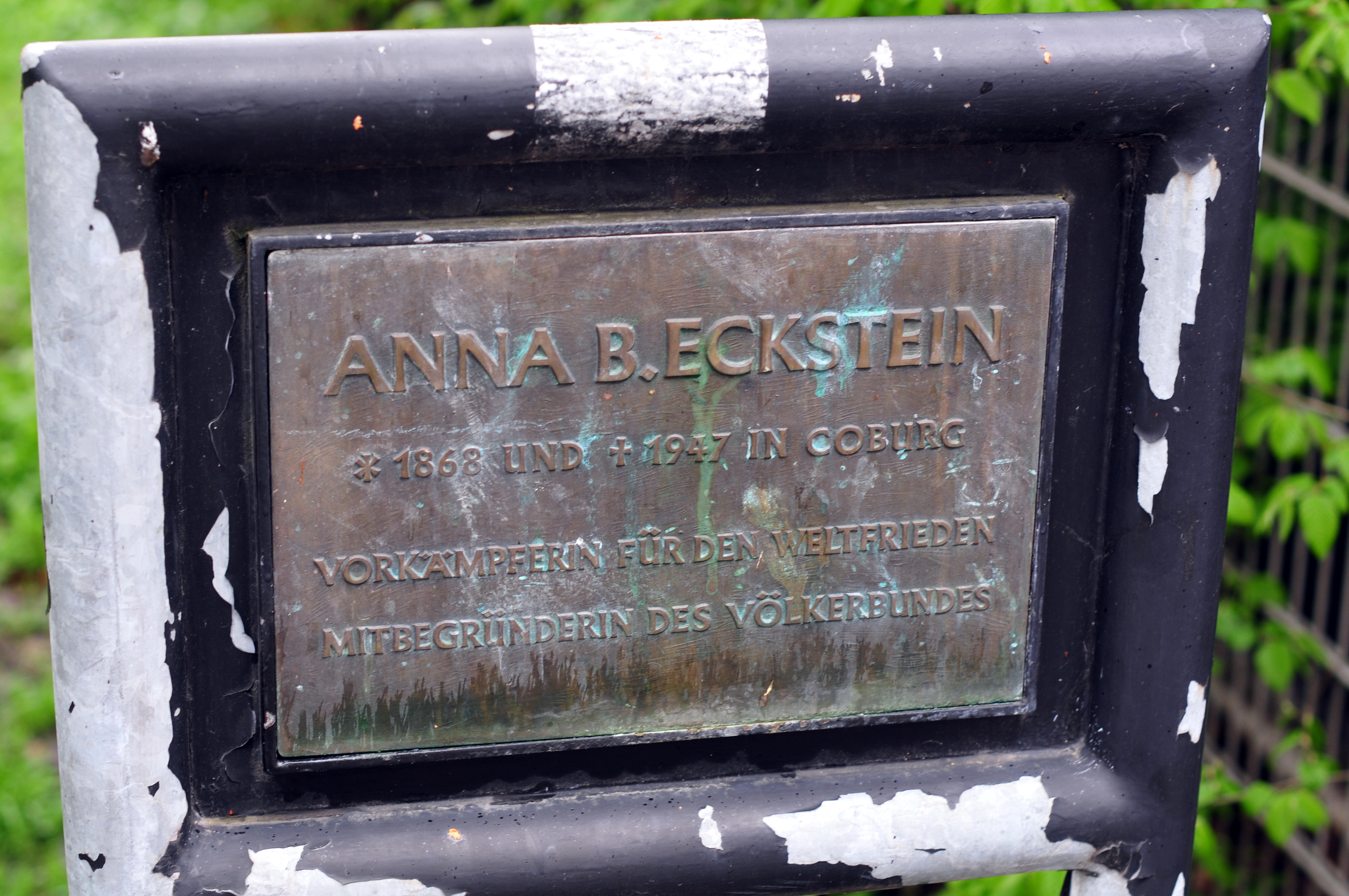
Plaque in Coburg

After the end of World War I Eckstein worked with the Deutsche Liga für den Völkerbund (German League of Nations) and set up regional groups of it, including in her home town Coburg. There she was very active in trying to keep the rise of National Socialism at bay. Eckstein also helped establish a local society of the German Democratic Party, an adult education centre, a community club, and a society for literature and music. In addition to that, Eckstein was active in the Protestant church, and was a member of the state synod.

Eckstein stayed in Switzerland from March to September 1933, and then returned to Coburg. In order to maintain awareness of the Kellogg–Briand Pact, she continued writing letters, and in 1942, she attempted to publish a manuscript titled "The Will to Power Harmonized", but the Reich Ministry of Public Enlightenment and Propaganda, under Goebbels, denied her permission. She died on 16 October 1947 at her home in Coburg.

== Legacy ==
The city of Coburg honoured Eckstein and her accomplishments by naming a green space after her in 1987.

In 2013 a primary school in Meeder was renamed to Anna-B.-Eckstein-Schule. The school has a peace museum on the ground floor and a room dedicated to the life of Anna Eckstein.

== See also ==
- List of peace activists
