= Mateu =

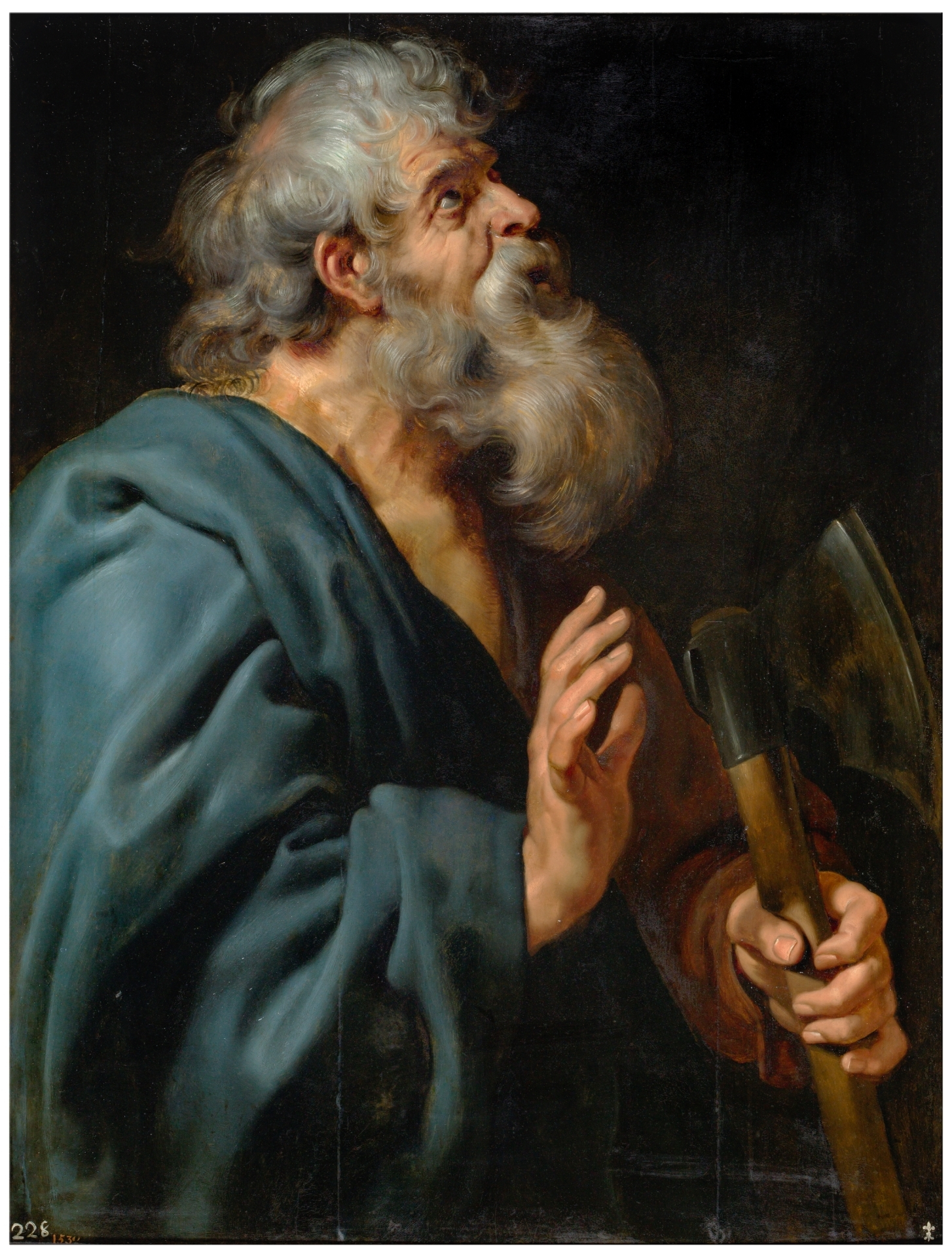
Mateu, aka St. Matthias

Mateu is a Catalan name, meaning Matthew. Notable people with the name include:

== Given name ==
- Mateu Morral (1880–1906), Spanish anarchist

== Surname ==
- Antonio Mateu Lahoz (born 1977), Spanish football referee
- Iñaki Mateu (born 1997), Argentine rugby union player
- Jaume Mateu (1382–1452), Valencian painter of the Gothic style
- Marc Mateu (born 1990), Spanish football midfielder

== See also ==
- Sant Mateu (disambiguation)
