= Matthieu =

Matthieu is a given name or surname. It comes from French Matthieu, which is from Latin Matthaeus, derived from Greek Ματθαῖος (Matthaios) from Hebrew מתתיהו (Matatyahu), מתיתיהו (Matityahu), meaning "gift of the Lord; gift of Yahweh". The name may refer to:

== First name ==
- Matthieu Aikins (born 1984), Canadian journalist
- Matthieu Androdias (born 1990), French rower
- Matthieu Bareyre (born 1986), French director
- Matthieu Bataille (born 1978), French judoka
- Matthieu Bemba (born 1988), French football player
- Matthieu Blazy (born 1984), French-Belgian designer
- Matthieu Bochu (born 1979), French football player
- Matthieu Bonafous (1793–1852), French botanist
- Matthieu Borsboom (born 1959), Dutch admiral
- Matthieu Boujenah (born 1976), French comedian
- Matthieu Boulo (born 1989), French cyclist
- Matthieu Chalmé (born 1980), French football player
- Matthieu Chedid (born 1971), French singer
- Matthieu Cottière (1581–1656), French pastor and writer
- Matthieu Dafreville (born 1982), French judoka
- Matthieu de La Teulière (died 1702), French painter
- Matthieu Delpierre (born 1981), French football player
- Matthieu Descoteaux (born 1977), Canadian ice hockey player
- Matthieu Dreyer (born 1989), French football player
- Matthieu Epolo (born 2005), Belgian football player
- Matthieu Fontaine (born 1987), French football player
- Matthieu Franke (born 1985), German rugby player
- Matthieu Gianni (born 1985), French football player
- Matthieu Hartley (born 1960), British musician
- Matthieu Jeannes (born 1987), French cyclist
- Matthieu Jost (figure skater) (born 1981), French dancer
- Matthieu Lahaye (born 1984), French racing car driver
- Matthieu Laurette (born 1970), French artist
- Matthieu Lecuyer (born 1980), French racing car driver
- Matthieu Lièvremont (born 1975), French rugby player
- Matthieu Louis-Jean (born 1976), French football player
- Matthieu Madelaine (born 1983), French swimmer
- Matthieu Marais (1664–1737), French jurist and writer
- Matthieu Mendès (born 1982), French musician
- Matthieu Onoseke (born 1988), Congolese football player
- Matthieu Ory (1492–1557), French theologian and inquisitor
- Matthieu Péché (born 1987), French canoeist
- Matthieu Petit-Didier (1659–1728), French theologian
- Matthieu Pichot (born 1989), French football player
- Matthieu Proulx (born 1981), Canadian football player
- Matthieu Reynaud (born 2001), French singer
- Matthieu Ricard (born 1946), French Buddhist monk
- Matthieu Rosset (born 1990), French diver
- Matthieu Sans (born 1988), French football player
- Matthieu Saunier (born 1990), French football player
- Matthieu Sprick (born 1981), French cyclist
- Matthieu Suiche (born 1988), French computer scientist and entrepreneur
- Matthieu Ugalde (born 1992), French rugby player
- Matthieu van Eysden (1896–1970), Dutch actor
- Matthieu Vaxivière (born 1994), French racing car driver
- Matthieu Verschuere (born 1972), French football player

=== Fictional characters ===
- Matthieu Joineau, French name of James Jones from the animated series Fireman Sam

== Surname ==
- Claude Matthieu (1766–1818), French general and diplomat
- François X. Matthieu (1818–1914), Canadian pioneer of Oregon
- Georg David Matthieu (1737–1778), German engraver and painter
- Jean-Baptiste Charles Matthieu (1763–1833), French politician
- Pierre Matthieu (1563–1621), French writer

== See also ==
- Matthieu River, Dominica
- Mathieu
- Matthew (name)
