= Prosecutor General of Finland =

The Prosecutor General of Finland (Finnish: Valtakunnansyyttäjä, Swedish: Riksåklagare) is the supreme prosecutor and head of the National Prosecution authority. The current Prosecutor General of Finland is Raija Toiviainen.

The Prosecutor General directs and develops prosecutorial activity by issuing general instructions and guidelines to prosecutors, appoints local prosecutors, and may take over a case from a subordinate prosecutor. The Prosecutor General acts as the prosecutor in the High Court of Impeachment, if the Parliament decides that charges are to be brought against the President of Finland or against a member of the Finnish Council of State.

Some of the duties of the Prosecutor General are assigned to the Deputy Prosecutor General, the office of which is held by Jorma Kalske. For routine prosecutorial tasks, the office has thirteen State Prosecutors, whose jurisdiction covers the entire country.

The first Prosecutor General of Finland was Matti Kuusimäki.

== See also ==
- Prosecutor
