= Matković =

Matković is a Croatian and Serbian surname, a patronymic derived from the masculine given name Matko. It may refer to:

- Dobrica Matković (1888–1973), Yugoslav politician
- Draga Matković (1907–2013), Croatian-born German classical pianist
- Gordana Matković (born 1960), Serbian politician
- Hrvoje Matković (1923–2010), Croatian historian
- Ivica Matković (football coach) (born 1953), Croatian football coach
- Ivica Matković (Ustaša) (1913–1945), Ustaša lieutenant colonel and concentration camp commandant
- Blanka Matković (born 1976), Croatian historian

== In popular culture ==
- Kristijan Matković, a Serbian soldier in a video game Battlefield 3

== See also ==
- Matkić
