= Matha (given name) =

Matha is a variant of the name Maitiú, an Irish form of Matthew.

== People with the name ==
- Matha Mág Tighearnán (fl. 1290–1311), Baron or Lord of Tullyhunco barony, County Cavan
- Matha Óg Ó Maoil Tuile (17th century), secretary to Rudhraighe Ó Domhnaill, 1st Earl of Tyrconnell and Hugh Ó Neill, 2nd Earl of Tyrone
- Matha mac Úmóir, one of the druids of the Tuatha Dé Danann according to Irish legend

== See also ==
- Maitiú
- Matthew
