= Matty =

Matty is a unisex given name and surname. It is also frequently a nickname of given names such as Matthew or Mateo.

== People with the given name or nickname ==
Notable people with the given name or nickname include:

=== A–E ===
- Matty Alou (1938–2011), Major League Baseball player from the Dominican Republic
- Matty Appleby (born 1972), English former footballer
- Matty Ashurst (born 1989), English rugby league player
- Matty Askin (born 1988), English cruiserweight boxer
- Matty Baldwin (1885–1918), American boxer
- Matty Beharrell (born 1993) English professional rugby league player
- Matty Bell (1899–1983), American college football player, football and basketball head coach and athletics administrator
- Matty Beniers (born 2002), American ice hockey player
- Matty Blair (born 1989), English footballer
- Matty Blythe (born 1988), English rugby league player
- Matty Cash (born 1997), Polish footballer
- Matty Cardarople (born 1983), American actor
- Matty Dale (born 1986), English rugby league player
- Matty Dawson-Jones (born 1990), English rugby league player
- Matty Dixon (born 1994), English professional footballer
- Matty Edwards (born 1991), English footballer

=== F–L ===
- Matty Fleming (born 1996), English rugby league player
- Matty Fouhy (1924–1977), Irish hurler
- Matty Fozard (born 1995), English rugby league player
- Matty Fryatt (born 1986), English footballer
- Matty Geoghegan (fl. 1936), Irish footballer
- Matty Hadden (born 1990), rugby league player from Northern Ireland
- Matty Cakes Haslip (born 1994), American Squatch Hunter & Silver Bullet Aficionado
- Matty Healy (born 1989), British musician, lead singer of The 1975
- Matty Holmes (born 1969), English former footballer
- Matty Hughes (born 1992), English footballer
- Matthew Ianniello (1920–2012), New York mobster known as "Matty the Horse"
- Matty James (born 1991), English footballer
- Matthew Johns (born 1971), Australian rugby league football commentator and former player, star of The Matty Johns Show variety television show
- Matty Kay (born 1989), English footballer
- Matty Kemp (1907–1999), American film actor
- Matty Lee (born 1998), British diver
- Matty Lewis (born 1975) American musician, rhythm guitarist and co-lead singer of Zebrahead
- Matty Litherland (born 2005), English footballer
- Matty Lund (born 1990), English footballer

=== M–T ===
- Matty Maher (1854–1931), Irish hurler
- Matty Malneck (1903–1981), American jazz bandleader, violinist, violist and songwriter
- Matty Marsh, English rugby league player
- Matty Matlock (1907–1978), American Dixieland jazz clarinetist, saxophonist and arranger
- Matty McNair, American explorer
- Matty McLean, New Zealand TV presenter
- Matty Mullins (born 1988), lead singer of American band Memphis May Fire
- Matty Pattison (born 1986), South African footballer
- Matty Pearson (born 1993), English footballer
- Matty Poole, English footballer who made his professional debut in 2009
- Matty Power (1901–1965), Irish hurler
- Matty Rich (born 1971), American film director, screenwriter, and video game executive
- Matty Roberts (disambiguation), several people
- Matty Robson (born 1985), English footballer
- Matty Russell (born 1993), Scottish rugby league player
- Matt Ryan (American football) (born 1985), nicknamed Matty Ice, American football player
- Matty Simmons, American film and television producer, and newspaper reporter
- Matty Smith (born 1987), English rugby league player
- Matty Templeton (born 1996), English footballer

== People with the surname ==
- Leigh Matty, a member of the British rock band Romeo's Daughter
- Richard P. Matty (1932–2019), American politician

== Fictional characters with the name ==
- the title character of the English folk ballad "Matty Groves"
- Matty Levan, in Skins
- Matty Nolan, in the British soap opera Brookside
- Matty McKibben, in the Awkward television series

== See also ==
- Mattie (name)
