= Kustaa Killinen =

Finnish politician

Kustaa Killinen (7 September 1849, Isokyrö – 5 January 1922) was a Finnish schoolteacher, writer and politician. He belonged to the Young Finnish Party. Killinen served as a Member of the Diet of Finland from 1897 to 1906 and as a Member of the Parliament of Finland from 1913 to 1916.
