= Mattis =

Mattis is a male given name, a Norwegian form of Matthew, and also a short form for Matthias. Notable people with the name include:

== Given name ==
- Mattis Hætta (1959–2022), Norwegian singer
- Mattis Mathiesen (1924–2010), Norwegian photographer and film director
- Mattis Næss (born 1973), Norwegian sprint canoer

== Last name ==
- Anne Tamar-Mattis, American attorney, human rights advocate, and founder of interACT
- Dwayne Mattis (born 1981), professional footballer
- Everton Mattis (born 1957), cricketer
- Guilherme Mattis (born 1990), football player
- James Mattis (born 1950), American general and former Secretary of Defense
- Peter Mattis, American computer programmer
- Ralph Mattis (1890–1960), baseball player
- Sam Mattis (born 1994), American Olympic discus thrower
- Shane Mattis (born 1980), professional goalkeeper from Jamaica
- Tyesha Mattis (born 1999), British artistic gymnast

== See also ==
- Mattis v Pollock, English tort law case
- Mattis Point, Newfoundland and Labrador
