= Mati (given name) =

Male given name

- Gender: Male
- Name day: 24 February

Mati is a male given name.

People named Mati include:

- Mati Ahven (1943–2022), Estonian politician
- Mati Alaver (born 1954), Estonian skier and coach
- Mati Erelt (born 1941), Estonian linguist
- Mati Ilisson (born 1960), Estonian politician
- Mati Kaal (born 1946), Estonian zoologist, mammalogist, animal ecologist and zoo director
- Mati Karelson (born 1948), Estonian chemist
- Mati Karmin (born 1959), Estonian sculptor
- Mati Kepp (born 1947), Estonian politician
- Mati Klarwein (1932–2002), German painter
- Mati Klooren (1938–2000), Estonian actor
- Mati Kuulberg (1947–2001), Estonian composer and violinist
- Mati Laur (born 1955), Estonian historian
- Mati Lember (born 1985), Estonian football player
- Mati Mandel (born 1945), Estonian archaeologist and historian
- Mati Mark (1941–2008), Estonian sport shooter
- Mati Meos (born 1946), Estonian engineer and politician
- Mati Nei (born 1942), Estonian chess player
- Mati Nuude (1941–2001), Estonian singer and weightlifter
- Mati Õun (1942–2024), Estonian military historian, writer, teacher and sports figure
- Mati Palm (1942–2018), Estonian opera singer
- Mati Pari (born 1974), Estonian football player
- Mati Pentus (born 1967), Russian mathematician of Estonian descent
- Mati Raidma (born 1965), Estonian politician
- Mati Shemoelof (born 1972), Israeli poet, editor, journalist and activist
- Mati Sirkel (born 1949), Estonian translator and writer
- Mati Talvik (1942–2018), Estonian television journalist
- Mati Unt (1944–2005), Estonian writer, essayist and theatre director
- Mati Vaarmann (born 1951), Estonian diplomat
- Mati Vaikjärv (born 1944), Estonian archer
- Matías Fernández (born 1986; also known as Mati Fernández), Chilean football player
