= Matthaios =

Matthaios is a Greek given name. Notable people with the name include:

- Matthaios Kamariotis (died 1490), Greek scholar of the Renaissance era
- Matthaios Kofidis (1855–1921), Greek businessman and member of the Ottoman parliament
- Matthaios Paranikas (1832-1914), Greek scholar
- Matthaios Tsahouridis (born 1978), Greek composer and musician of stringed instruments

== See also ==
- Matthew (name)
