= Tuurala =

Village in Isokyrö, Finland

Coordinates: 63°01′N 22°17′E

Tuurala is a village in Isokyrö, Finland. In 1997, it was nominated as "village of the year" in Southern Ostrobothnia. The village association has purchased a former school house, which is now used to organize educational events and as an information point with 12 computer work stations.
