= Maitiú =

Maitiú is the Irish form of Matthew, a masculine given name of biblical origin.

== People ==
- Maitiú Ó Tuathail, Irish physician

== See also ==
- List of Irish-language given names
- Matha
- Feis Maitiú Corcaigh
