= Isokyrö =

Isokyrö Storkyro
- Municipality
- Isokyrön kunta Storkyro kommun
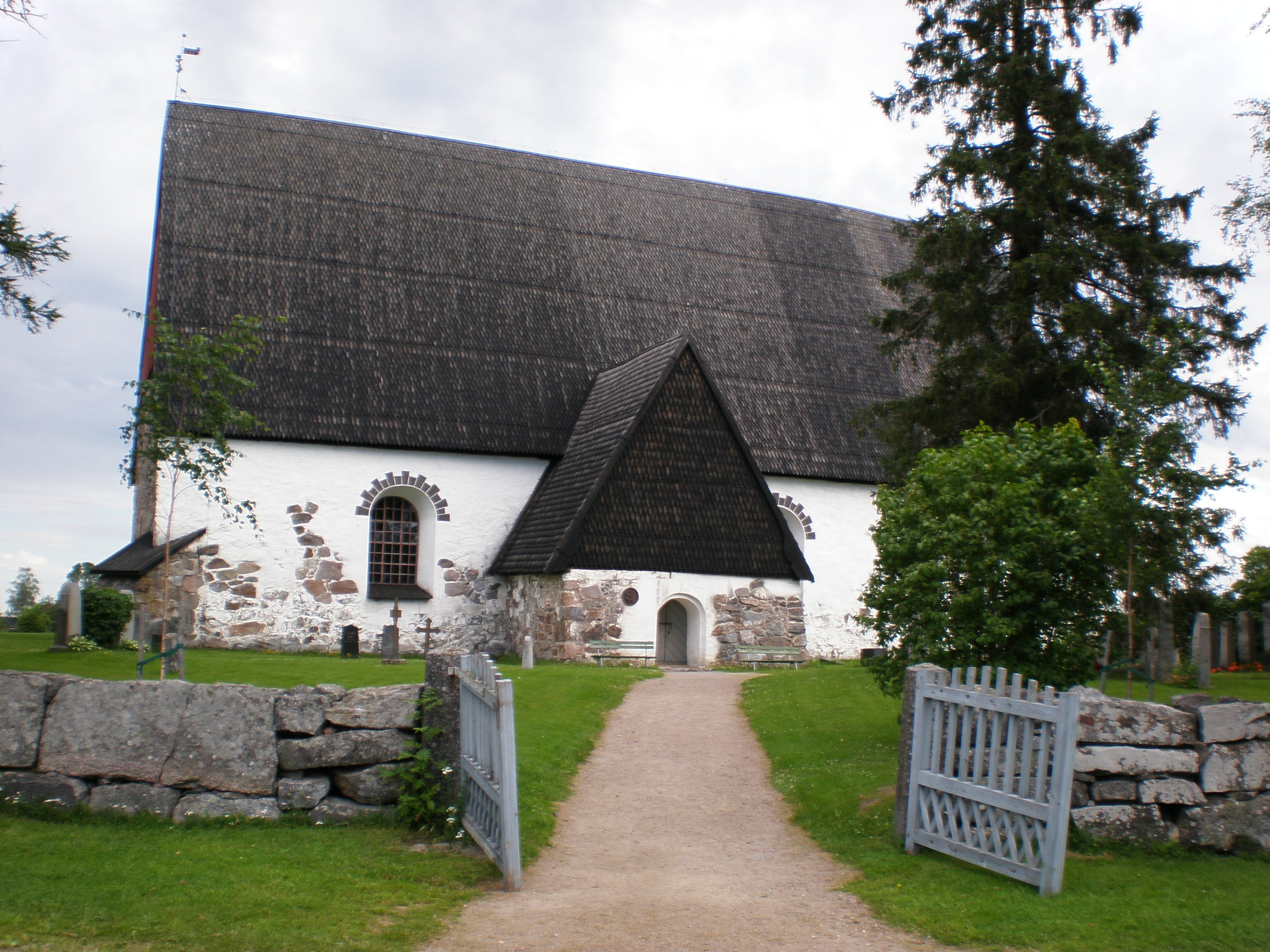
- Isokyrö Church

- Coat of arms

- Location of Isokyrö in Finland
- Interactive map of Isokyrö
- Coordinates: 63°00′N 022°19′E
- Country: Finland
- Region: South Ostrobothnia
- Sub-region: Seinäjoki
- Charter: 1785

Government
  - Municipality manager: Tero Kankaanpää

Area (2018-01-01)
  - Total: 356.91 km^{2} (137.80 sq mi)
  - Land: 354.13 km^{2} (136.73 sq mi)
  - Water: 2.79 km^{2} (1.08 sq mi)
  - Rank: 216th largest in Finland

Population (2025-12-31)
  - Total: 4,261
  - Rank: 184th largest in Finland
  - Density: 12.03/km^{2} (31.2/sq mi)

Population by native language
  - Finnish: 97% (official)
  - Swedish: 0.8%
  - Others: 2.2%

Population by age
  - 0 to 14: 16.1%
  - 15 to 64: 55.4%
  - 65 or older: 28.5%
- Time zone: UTC+02:00 (EET)
  - Summer (DST): UTC+03:00 (EEST)
- Website: isokyro.fi

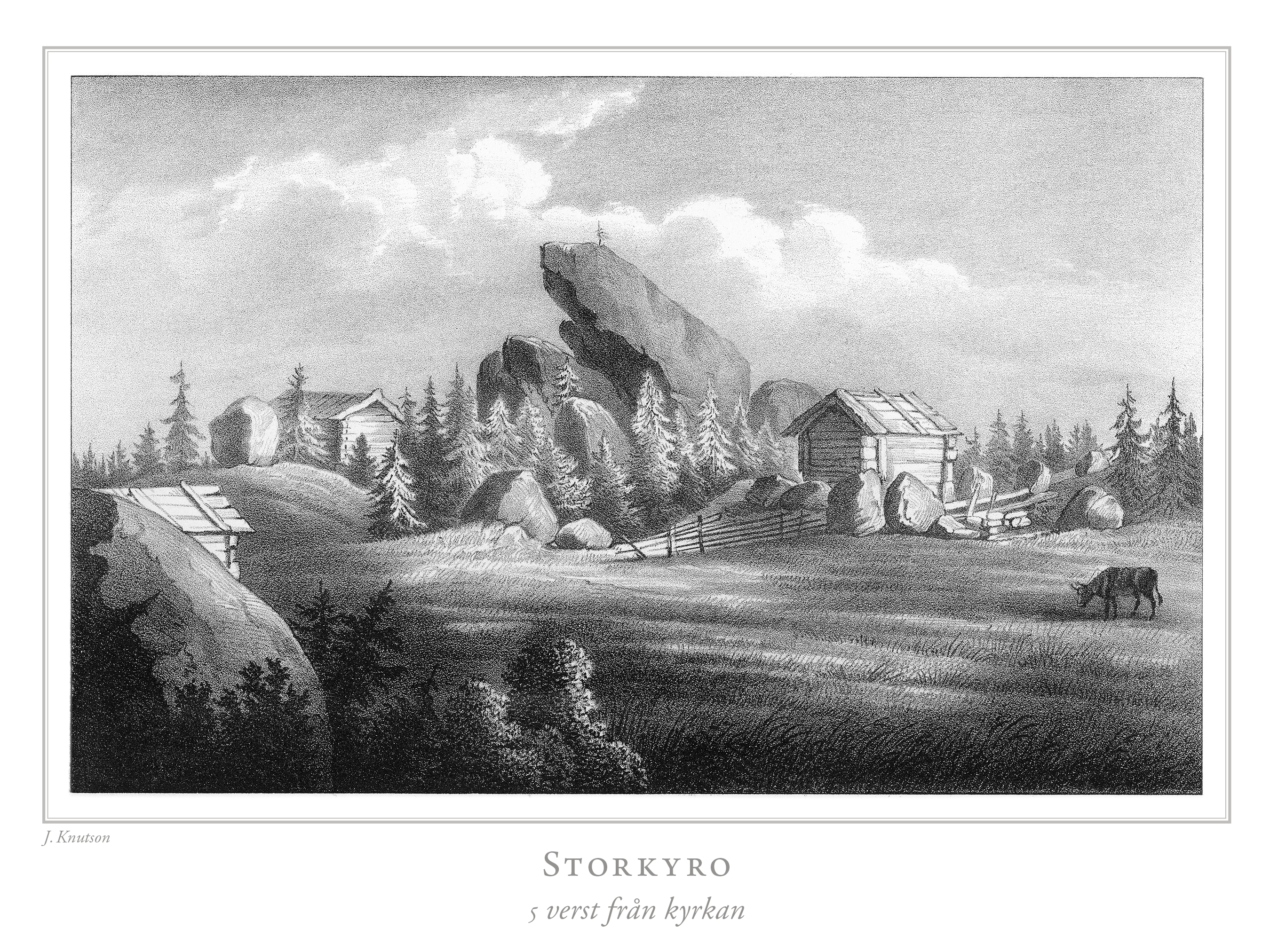
Illustration in Finland framstäldt i teckningar edited by Zacharias Topelius and published 1845-1852.

Isokyrö (Finnish: [ˈisoˌkyrø]; Swedish: Storkyro) is a municipality of Finland. It is located in the South Ostrobothnia region, 43 kilometres (27 mi) from Vaasa. The municipality has a population of 4,261 (31 December 2025) and covers an area of 356.91 square kilometres (137.80 sq mi) of which 2.79 km^{2} (1.08 sq mi) is water. The population density is 12.03 inhabitants per square kilometre (31.2/sq mi).

In the name of the municipality, "iso" means big; "kyrö", on the other hand, is a Tavastian dialect and means a quarry, rocky or rugged terrain for hiding. The municipality is unilingually Finnish.

According to Traficom, Isokyrö is the most motorized municipality in Finland with 718 cars per thousand inhabitants.

== Geography ==
There are 13,000 hectares (32,000 acres) of cultivated fields.

Isonkyrö's neighboring municipalities are Ilmajoki, Kauhava, Laihia, Seinäjoki, Vaasa and Vörå.

Localities:

- Tuurala

== Notable people ==
- Matti Haapoja (1845–1895), serial killer
- Kustaa Killinen (1849–1922), schoolteacher, writer and politician
- Matti Pohto (1817–1857), bookbinder and book collector
- Eino S. Repo (1919–2002), journalist and politician
- Ilmari Turja (1901–1998), journalist, playwright and lawyer
- Marjo Yli-Kiikka (born 1978), sports shooter

== See also ==
- Levänluhta
- Isokyrö railway station
- Tervajoki railway station
- Battle of Napue
