= Matouš =

Matouš is a Czech masculine given name and surname (feminine: Matoušová). It is a Czech variant of the name Matthew. Notable people with the name include:

== Given name ==
- František Klácel, full name František Matouš Klácel (1808–1872), Czech writer and philosopher
- Matouš Ruml (born 1985), Czech actor
- Matouš Trmal (born 1998), Czech footballer

== Surname ==
- Helena Matouš (born 1921), Czech-Italian tennis player
- Ilja Matouš (1931–2018), Czech cross-country skier
- Jan Matouš (born 1961), Czech biathlete
- Josef Matouš (born 1942), Czech ski jumper
- Elena Matous (born 1953), Italian alpine skier who competed for Italy, San Marino, Iran and Luxembourg
- Milan Matouš (1923–2003), Czech-Italian ice hockey player and tennis player

== See also ==
- Matouš the Cobbler, 1948 Czechoslovak film
