= Juhani Aataminpoika =

Finnish serial killer (1826–1854)

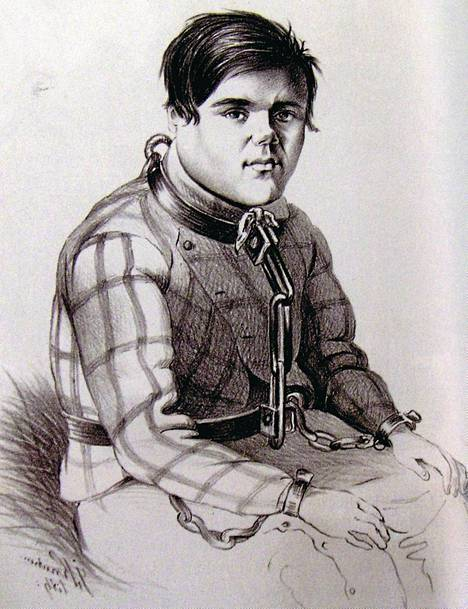
- 1849 lithography of Juhani Aataminpoika by Johan Knutson
- Born: Johan Adamsson; 31 July 1826; Vesivehmaa, Grand Duchy of Finland
- Died: September 1854 (aged 28); Sveaborg (Suomenlinna), Grand Duchy of Finland
- Other name: "Kerpeikkari"
- Conviction: Murder
- Penalty: Death; commuted to life imprisonment plus 40 lashes

Details
- Victims: 12
- Span of crimes: October – November 1849
- Country: Finland
- Date apprehended: 20 November 1849

Juhani Aataminpoika (Finnish pronunciation: [ˈjuhɑni ˈɑːtɑminˌpoi̯kɑ]; 31 July 1826 – September 1854) alias Kerpeikkari (Finnish: [ˈkerpei̯kːɑri]), was a Finnish serial killer. He killed 12 people in southern Finland between October and November 1849. He has been characterized as the first serial killer in Finland.

== Biography ==
Juhani Aataminpoika left home at the age of 15, living a nomadic life and committing petty crimes. In October 1849, he was charged with stealing horses and imprisoned. During his imprisonment, he was taken from the Hämeenlinna prison to Hauho, where the court was to be held on his crimes. During transport, he escaped, starting a homicidal spree. In Lammi he killed the master and mistress of the Helisevä croft with a man named Kustaa Kratula. From there, he went back to his home in Heinola, where he killed his stepfather and mother and their two children before fleeing to the forest.

Shortly afterwards, he killed a man to get his certificate to get a job at a canal site. Aataminpoika travelled to the Saimaa Canal killing more people on the way. He did not stay at the canal work site but killed a sailor in order to get his papers.

At the beginning of November, Aataminpoika returned to Lammi, from which he left with his friend Antti Suikko to go to the Tyry croft in the village of Hattelmala. The men vandalized the house, maimed the tenants, and stole their money. The elderly mistress of the house died later from her injuries, but the others managed to survive the attack.

Shortly thereafter, on 20 November, Aataminpoika was caught in Palsa near the Lammi and Padasjoki border. At the end of the trial, the Vyborg Court of Appeal sentenced him to death. The sentence was upheld in the Senate's Department of Justice, but the Emperor commuted it to 40 lashes and a life imprisonment sentence. He was transferred to Sveaborg (Suomenlinna) in January 1853 and kept there, chained to a wall, until his death in 1854.

Juhani Aataminpoika was also known by the nickname "Kerpeikkari", which is coined from Swedish word skarprättare, meaning 'executioner'. He was famous in his own time, but his actions were eventually forgotten and he did not end up with the same level of fame as, for example, Matti Haapoja. In the 2000s, however, he once again sparked an interest in researchers.

== Film ==
A film about Juhani Aataminpoika's life is in the planning stages. The script is written by Kari Hietalahti, and the film is to be directed by Peter Franzén. Earlier plans were to see the movie released by the autumn of 2017, but as of 2022, the film has yet to be financed, putting it in production limbo.

== See also ==
- List of serial killers by country
  - Matti Haapoja

== Sources ==
- Hämeenlinnan Kaupunkiuutisten artikkeli vuodelta 2003 (Archive.org)
- Kaijus Ervasti (1992). The Murmansk Portrait: Matti Haapoja 1845-1895. Helsinki. ISBN 951-37-0976-0.

== Literature ==
- Jarmo Haapalainen (2007). Twelve murders in five weeks, Heinola's "beast" Finnish record (in Finnish). Heinola. ISBN 978-952-99946-0-1.
- The only serial killer in Finland. Juhani Aataminpoika's crimes and punishment (in Finnish). Teemu Keskisarja. 2008. ISBN 978-951-796-538-5.
