= Matthaeus =

Matthaeus (also Matthæus) is a given name, the Latin form of Matthew. Notable people:

- Matthaeus Greuter (1564–1638), German etcher and engraver who worked in Rome
- Matthaeus Pipelare (c. 1450 – c. 1515), Netherlandish composer, choir director, and possibly wind instrument player of the Renaissance
- Matthaeus Platearius (12th century), physician from the medical school at Salerno
- Matthaeus Silvaticus (c. 1280 – c. 1342), Latin medical writer and botanist
- Matthæus Yrsselius (1541–1629), abbot of St. Michael's Abbey, Antwerp from 1614 until his death
