= Mati Ilisson =

Estonian politician

Mati Ilisson (born 24 May 1960 in Tõrva) is an Estonian politician. He was a member of VIII Riigikogu, representing the Social Democratic Party.
