= Levänluhta =

Spring & archaeological site in Finland

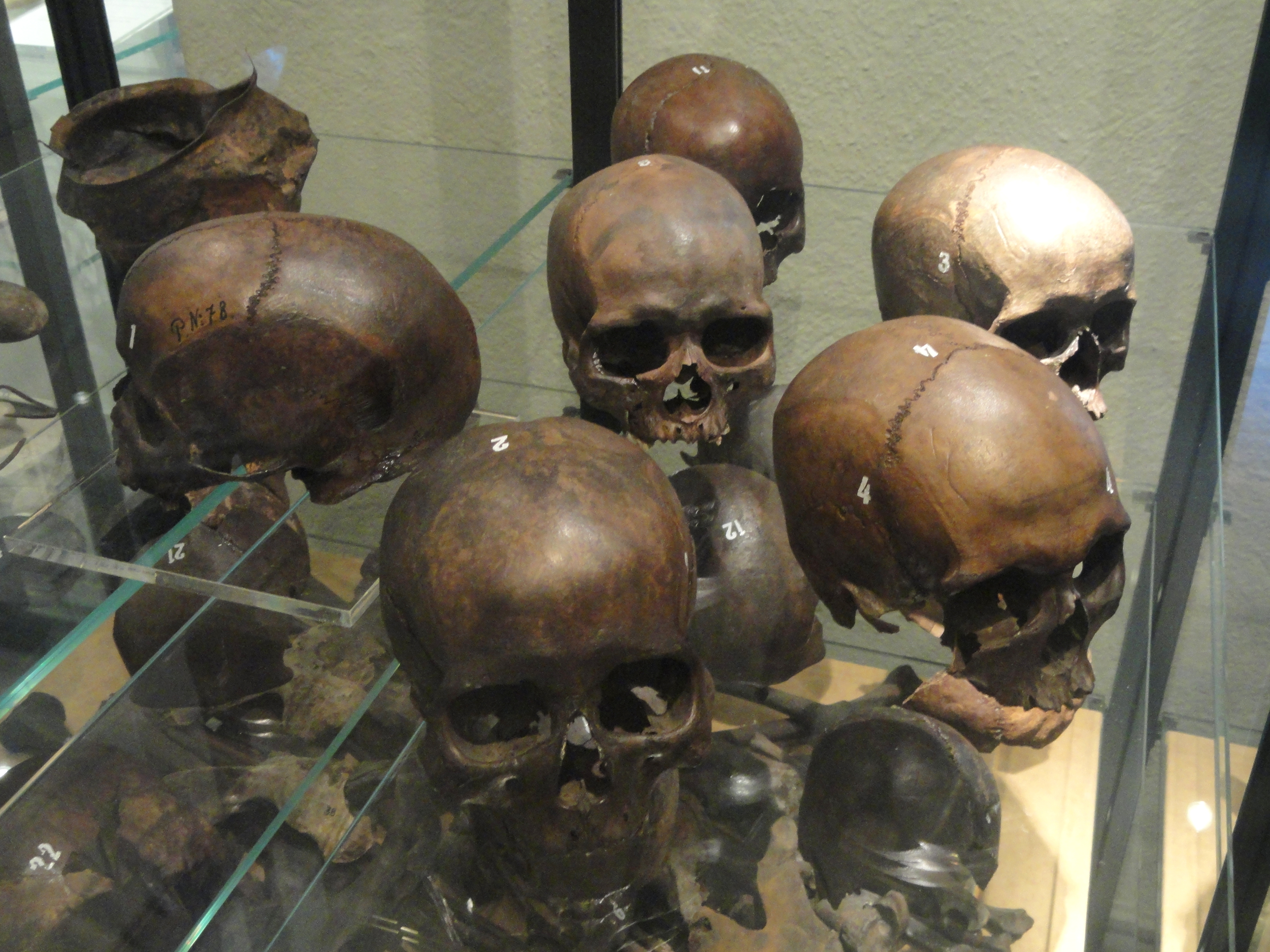
Remains from Levänluhta at the National Museum of Finland.

Levänluhta (Finnish: [ˈleʋænˌluhtɑ]; lit. "alga's floodmeadow") or Leväluhta is a spring and prominent archaeological site in the village of Orismala in Isokyrö, Finland. It was used as an Iron Age water graveyard from the 5th to the 8th centuries, containing remains of around 100 individuals. It's one of the oldest known burial sites in Finland with preserved human bones, as the waterlogged environment had contributed to an exceptionally good preservation of the remains.

Ancient DNA of 13 individuals from Levänluhta has been further studied, revealing that most of them had some Siberian-derived genetic ancestry like all Fenno-Ugric peoples, with a slightly closer resemblance to Sami than Finnish people, but the difference was not considerable.
