= Matheus =

Matheus is a Portuguese given name: Notable people with the name include:

== Given name ==
- Matheus Aiás (born 1996), Brazilian footballer
- Matheus Alessandro (born 1996), Brazilian footballer
- Matheus Pucinelli de Almeida (born 2001), Brazilian tennis player
- Matheus Alueendo (born 1961), Namibian military officer
- Matheus Alves (born 1993), Brazilian footballer
- Matheus Alves (born 2005), Brazilian footballer
- Matheus Anjos (born 1998), Brazilian soccer player
- Matheus Babi (born 1997), Brazilian footballer
- Matheus Banguelê (born 1996), Brazilian footballer
- Matheus Barbosa (born 1994), Brazilian footballer
- Matheus dos Santos Batista (born 1995), Brazilian footballer
- Matheus Bertotto (born 1993), Brazilian footballer
- Matheus Bissi (born 1991), Brazilian footballer
- Matheus Biteco (1995-2016), Brazilian footballer
- Matheus Borges Domingues (born January 1992), Brazilian footballer
- Matheus Borges (born 1993), Brazilian hockey player
- Matheus Cotulio Bossa (born 1993), Brazilian footballer
- Matheus Simonte Bressaneli (born 1993), Brazilian footballer
- Matheus Bueno (born 1998), Brazilian footballer
- Matheus Butrymowicz (1745-1814), Polish-Lithuanian statesman and landlord
- Matheus Carvalho (born 1992), Brazilian footballer
- Matheus Cassini (born 1996), Brazilian footballer
- Matheus de Castro (1569-1677), first Catholic bishop from India
- Matheus Cavichioli (born 1986), Brazilian footballer
- Matheus Costa (footballer) (born 1995), Brazilian football player
- Matheus Costa (football manager) (born 1987), Brazilian football manager
- Matheus Cuello (born 1995), Uruguayan footballer
- Matheus Cunha (born 1999), Brazilian footballer
- Matheus Dantas (born 1998), Brazilian footballer
- Matheus Davó (born 1999), Brazilian footballer
- Matheus Diovany (born 1994), Brazilian footballer
- Matheus Fernandes (born 1998), Brazilian footballer
- Matheus Ferraz (born 1985), Brazilian footballer
- Matheus Frizzo (born 1998), Brazilian footballer
- Matheus Galdezani (born 1992), Brazilian footballer
- Matheus Gonçalves (born 1994), Brazilian footballer
- Matheus Henrique (born 1997), Brazilian footballer
- Matheus Iacovelli (born 1998), Brazilian footballer
- Matheus Menezes Jácomo (born 1991), Brazilian footballer
- Matheus Jesus (born 1997), Brazilian footballer
- Matheus de Sancto Johanne (died 1391), French composer
- Matheus de Layens (died 1483), Belgian architect
- Matheus Leist (born 1998), Brazilian racing driver
- Matheus Leoni (born 1991), Brazilian footballer
- Matheus Lopes (born 1985), Brazilian football defender
- Matheus Dória Macedo (born 1994), Brazilian footballer
- Matheus Machado (born 2001), Brazilian footballer
- Matheus Lima Magalhães (born 1992), Brazilian footballer
- Matheus Mancini (born 1994), Brazilian footballer
- Matheus Marcondes (born 1903), Brazilian long-distance runner
- Matheus Mascarenhas (born 1998), Brazilian footballer
- Matheus Matias (born 1998), Brazilian footballer
- Matheus Humberto Maximiano (born 1989), Brazilian footballer
- Matheus Nachtergaele (born 1968), Brazilian actor
- Matheus Leite Nascimento (born 1983), Brazilian footballer
- Matheus Neris (born 1999), Brazilian footballer
- Matheus Nicolau (born 1993), Brazilian mixed martial artist
- Matheus Nolasco (born 1995), Brazilian footballer
- Matheus Nunes (born 1998), Brazilian footballer
- Matheus Oliveira (born 1994), Brazilian footballer
- Matheus Ortigoza (born 1993), Brazilian footballer
- Matheus Pato (born 1995), Brazilian footballer
- Matheus Peixoto (born 1995), Brazilian footballer
- Matheus Pereira (born 1996), Brazilian footballer
- Matheus Pereira (born 1998), Brazilian footballer
- Matheus Reis (born 1995), Brazilian footballer
- Matheus Rezende (born 1995), Brazilian footballer
- Matheus Ribeiro (born 1993), Brazilian footballer
- Matheus Rocha (born 1998), Brazilian footballer
- Matheus Rodrigues (born 1996), Brazilian football player
- Matheus Rossetto (born 1996), Brazilian footballer
- Matheus Sales (born 1995), Brazilian footballer
- Matheus Salustiano (born 1993), Brazilian footballer
- Matheus Santana (born 1996), Brazilian swimmer
- Matheus Isaías dos Santos (born 1996), Brazilian footballer
- Matheus Oliveira Santos (born 1997), Brazilian footballer
- Matheus Santos (volleyball) (born 1996), Brazilian volleyball player
- Matheus Sávio (born 1997), Brazilian footballer
- Matheus Shikongo (born 1950), Namibian politician
- Matheus da Silva (born 2000), Brazilian footballer
- Matheus Nogueira da Silva (born 1986), Brazilian footballer
- Matheus Silva (born 1996), Brazilian footballer
- Matheus Thuler (born 1999), Brazilian footballer
- Matheus Vargas (born 1996), Brazilian footballer
- Matheus Caldeira Vidotto (born 1993), Brazilian footballer
- Matheus Coradini Vivian (born 1982), Brazilian footballer

== Surname ==
- Carlos Matheus (born 1984), Brazilian mathematician
- Carlos César Matheus (born 1984), Brazilian football midfielder
- Giovanna Venetiglio Matheus (born 1989), Brazilian trampoline gymnast
- Jean Matheus (1590-1672), French engraver
- Jonas Matheus (born 1986), Namibian boxer
- Michael Matheus (born 1953), German historian
- Rosângela Matheus (born 1963), Brazilian politician
- William Matheus (born 1990), Brazilian footballer

== See also ==
- Matthias
- Mateus (name)
