= Mads (given name) =

Mads is a male given name, a Danish, Norwegian and Swedish Scandinavian form of the English name Matthew. Notable people with the name include:

== Business ==
- Mads Clausen (1905–1966), Danish industrialist and founder of Danfoss
- Mads Langaard (1815–1891), Norwegian brewery owner and industrialist
- Mads Johansen Lange (1807–1856), Danish trader, entrepreneur and peacemaker on Bali

== Music ==
- Mads Arp, Danish composer, producer and electronic music pioneer
- Mads Benjamin Kortland Hav (born 1985), Danish rapper
- Mads Christian (born 2000), Danish singer
- Mads Eriksen (born 1962), Norwegian guitarist and composer
- Mads Langer (born 1984), Danish composer, singer-songwriter and pop musician born Langer Clausen
- Mads Tolling (born 1980), Danish-American violinist and composer
- Mads Tunebjerg, Danish bass player in the Danish rock band Kashmir
- Mads Vinding, Danish jazz double-bassist

== Politics ==
- Mads Fuglede (born 1971), Danish politician
- Mads Gilbert (born 1947), Norwegian doctor, activist and politician
- Mads Lauritz Madsen (1782–1840), Norwegian politician
- Mads Rørvig, Danish politician

== Sports ==
- Mads Aaquist (born 1994), Danish footballer
- Mads Agger (born 1999), Danish footballer
- Mads Albæk (born 1990), Danish footballer
- Mads Andersen (rower) (born 1978), Danish rower
- Mads Burnell (born 1994), Danish mixed martial artist
- Mads Dahm (born 1988), Norwegian footballer
- Mads Hermansen (born 2000), Danish footballer
- Mads Juel Andersen (born 1997), Danish footballer
- Mads Glæsner (born 1988), Danish swimmer
- Mads Jørgensen (born 1979), Danish retired footballer
- Mads Jørgensen (footballer, born 1998), Danish footballer
- Mads Junker (born 1981), Danish pundit and retired footballer
- Mads Kaggestad (born 1977), Norwegian retired road racing cyclist
- Mads Laudrup (born 1989), Danish professional football player who currently plays for HB Køge
- Mads Østberg (born 1987), Norwegian rally car driver
- Mads Pedersen (badminton) (born 1990), Danish badminton player
- Mads Pedersen (cyclist) (born 1995), Danish road racing cyclist, 2019 Road Race World Champion
- Mads Pedersen (footballer, born 1993), Danish footballer
- Mads Rasmussen (born 1981), Danish rower
- Mads Roerslev (born 1999), Danish footballer
- Mads Søndergaard (born 2002), Danish footballer
- Mads Timm (born 1984), Danish footballer
- Mads Valentin (born 1996), Danish footballer

== Other fields ==
- Mads Alstrup (1808–1876), Danish portrait photographer
- Mads Andersen (chess player) (born 1995), Danish chess grandmaster
- Mads Andersen (poker player) (born 1970), Danish poker and backgammon player
- Mads Brügger (born 1972), Danish filmmaker and TV host
- Mads Eriksen (cartoonist) (born 1977), Norwegian cartoonist
- Mads Gram (1875–1929), Norwegian physician
- Mads Kähler Holst (born 1973), Danish archaeologist and museum curator
- Mads Mikkelsen (born 1965), Danish actor
- Mads Nissen (born 1979), Danish photojournalist
- Mads Sjøgård Pettersen, Norwegian actor

== Fictional characters ==
- Mads Nielsen, a character from a German Netflix series Dark
