= Matthaei =

Matthaei is a surname. Notable people with the surname include:

- Charise Matthaei (born 2000), German ice dancer
- Christian Frederick Matthaei (1744–1811), Thuringian classical scholar
- Dieter Matthaei (born 1949), German radiotherapist
- Gabrielle Matthaei (1876–1930), English plant physiologist and economic botanist
- Heinrich August Matthaei (1781–1835), German violinist and composer
- J. Heinrich Matthaei (1929–2025), German biochemist
- Kurt Matthaei (1886–1974), German lawyer and Nazi Party politician
- Rob Matthaei (born 1966), Dutch footballer and coach
- Rudolf Matthaei (1895–1918), German World War I flying ace
