= Metković, Bogatić =

Metković Метковић (Serbian) Mačvanski Metković
- Village (Selo)
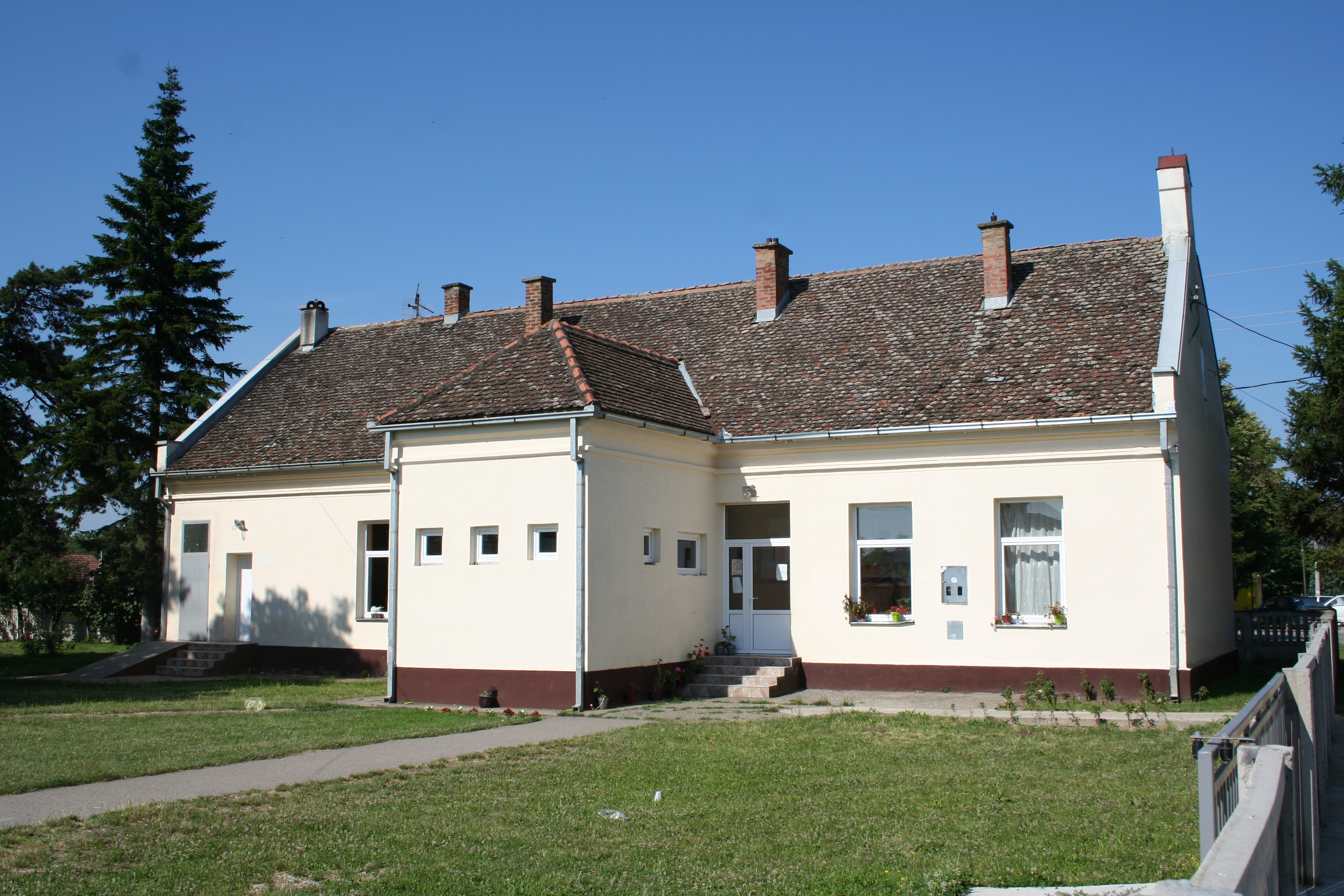
- Interactive map of Metković
- Coordinates: 44.855°N 19.546°E
- Country: Serbia
- Statistical Region: Šumadija and Western Serbia
- Region: Mačva
- District: Mačva District
- Municipality: Bogatić

Population (2002)
  - Total: 1,244
- Time zone: UTC+1 (CET)
  - Summer (DST): UTC+2 (CEST)

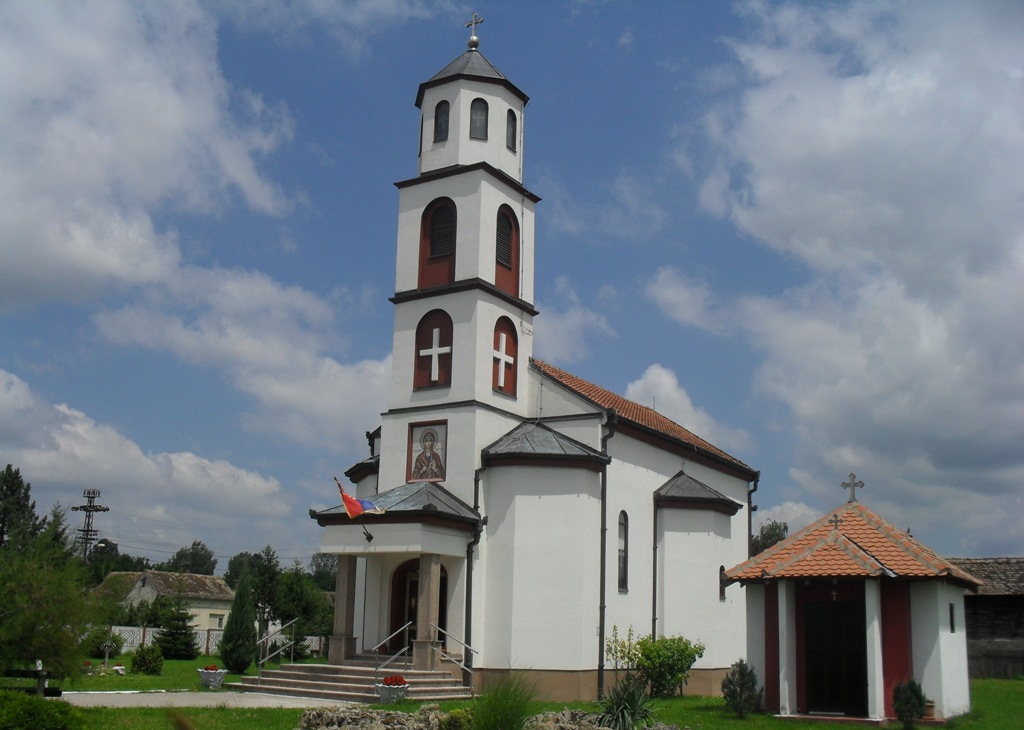
Orthodox church

Metković or Mačvanski Metković (Serbian Cyrillic: Мачвански Метковић, pronounced [mɛ̂tkɔʋit͡ɕ]) is a village in the municipality of Bogatić, Serbia. According to the 2002 census, the village has a population of 1244 people.
