= Jarmo Wasama =

Finnish ice hockey player

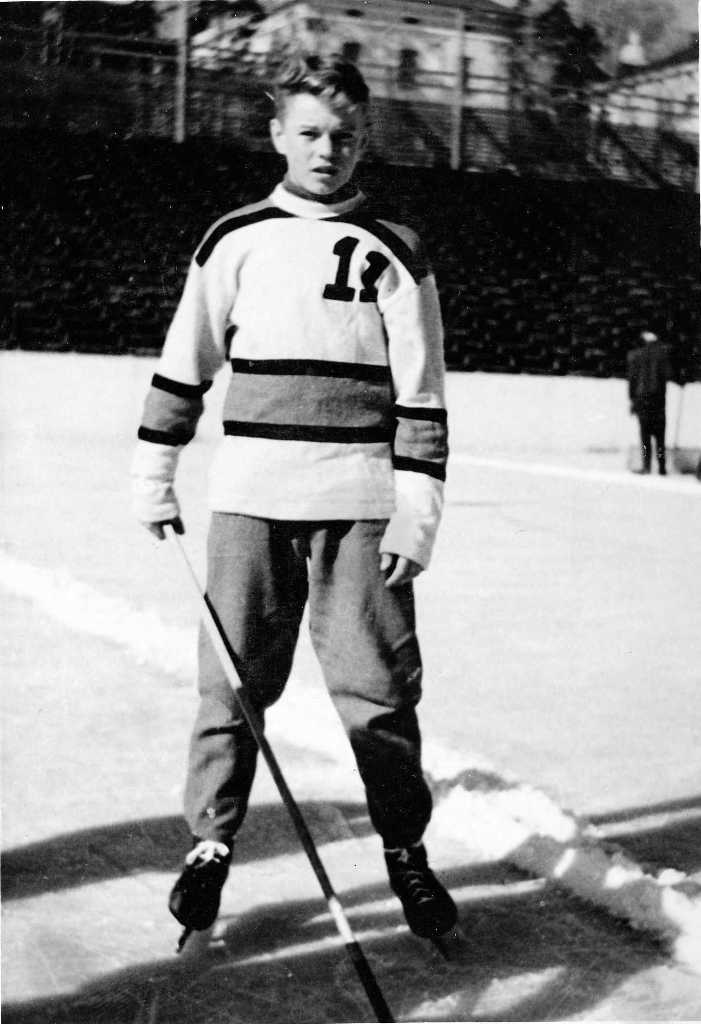
- Born: December 2, 1943 Elimäki, Finland
- Died: February 2, 1966 (aged 22) Tampere, Finland
- Height: 6 ft 1 in (185 cm)
- Weight: 184 lb (83 kg; 13 st 2 lb)
- Position: Defence
- Shot: Left
- Played for: SM-sarja; Ilves
- National team: Finland
- Playing career: 1960–1966

Pertti Jarmo Sakari Wasama (December 2, 1943 in Elimäki, Finland – February 2, 1966 in Tampere, Finland) was an ice hockey player who played in the SM-sarja. He played for Ilves. He was inducted into the Finnish Hockey Hall of Fame in 1985. Wasama won two championships (one after death), one silver and two bronzes. He was elected to all-star team 5 times (one after death).

Wasama possessed good skills for a defenseman in Finland and it is much speculated would Wasama have been the first Finnish player in the NHL. He competed in the men's tournament at the 1964 Winter Olympics.

In February 1966, Wasama lost his life in an automobile accident that resulted from foggy weather conditions. While on his way home from practice, Wasama's car struck a tractor which had stalled on the road. Wasama's car also had a passenger, his father, who did suffer some injuries but survived the accident. Wasama's father, Matti was also a former Ilves-player.

Wasama's jersey number 2 was immediately retired from use by Ilves.

The trophy which is handed out to the best "rookie" player in SM-liiga is named as Jarmo Wasama memorial trophy in honour of Wasama.

== International play ==
Despite his young age by the time of his death Wasama had already played 74 times for national team including 3 World Championship tournaments and 1 Olympics.

The list included the 1965 World Championship tournament which was the first one held in Finland.

International statistics

Year	Team	Event	GP	G	A	Pts	PIM
1962	Finland	WCh	7	0	3	3	0
1963	Finland	WCh	7	1	1	2	4
1964	Finland	Oly	8	0	1	1	6
1965	Finland	WCh	7	3	1	4	2
Senior International Totals			73	7	12	19	12

== Career statistics ==
			Regular Season					Playoffs
Season	Team	League	GP	G	A	Pts	PIM	GP	G	A	Pts	PIM
1960-61	Ilves	SM-liiga	18	4	2	6	28	--	--	--	--	--
1961-62	Ilves	SM-liiga	18	3	4	7	18	--	--	--	--	--
1962-63	Ilves	SM-liiga	18	9	5	14	16	--	--	--	--	--
1963-64	Ilves	SM-liiga	18	4	4	8	4	--	--	--	--	--
1964-65	Ilves	SM-liiga	18	3	4	7	7	--	--	--	--	--
1965-66	Ilves	SM-liiga	16	4	3	7	14	--	--	--	--	--
SM-liiga Totals			106	27	22	49	87	--	--	--	--	--
