= Mats Ekman =

Estonian poet (1865–1934)

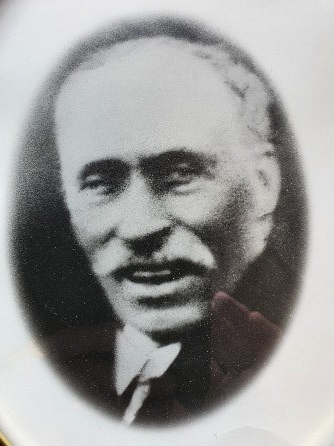
- Mats Ekman
- Born: Mats Ekman; 12 March 1865; Rickul, Estonia
- Died: 13 March 1934 (aged 69); Rickul, Estonia
- Resting place: Roslep Cemetery
- Occupations: Cattle Shepard, postman, manor care taker
- Writing career
- Language: Estonian-Swedish dialect of Nuckö (Noarootsi)
- Genre: Poetry
- Movement: Naturalism

Mats Ekman (12 March 1865 – 13 March 1934) was an Estonian-Swedish village poet from Ätsve in Noarootsi Parish in Läänemaa County, Estonia. Mats Ekman wrote poems in the Estonian-Swedish dialect and his poetry is probably the most popular of all within the Estonian-Swedish cultural sphere.

== Historical background ==
Among several linguistic minorities that lived in Estonia before the Second World War, there was also a Swedish-speaking one. Historical evidence confirms that Swedes have been living in Estonia since the 13th century. According to some archaeological investigations, Swedish settlements may, however, have been existing much earlier than that ("A book about Estonian Swedes”, part 1). However, the Swedish speaking population formed only a small group. Before World War II, they numbered about 9,000 people. Further back in history the Estonian-Swedish population was more numerous, but over time assimilation with the majority population decreased the number of Estonian-Swedes. Practically all members of this minority group lived in Estonia's coastal municipalities within a narrow, but relatively long coastal strip including both mainland and islands, from the areas a bit east of Tallinn (formerly Reval) in the northeast to the small island of Runö (Est. Ruhnu) in the Gulf of Riga in the southwest. Most of Estonian-Swedes made their living as small farmers and fishermen.

With the outbreak of World War II, when the Baltic states were occupied by first the Soviet Union, thereafter Germany, and then again by the Soviet Union, conditions became so unbearable that tens of thousands of Balts escaped west. Of the 9,000 Estonian-Swedes, approx. 8,000 fled, most of them to Sweden. This meant in practice the end of Swedish culture in Estonia.

When we say that this group of people was Swedish-speaking, one must be aware that the geographical location, where the Baltic Sea separates the Estonian-Swedish settlement area from the Swedish mainland, entailed that the Swedish language developed differently in Sweden compared to in Estonia. The Estonian-Swedes therefore over time came to speak in a manner so dissimilar from the national Swedish, that a Swedish listener may at first almost believe that it is a foreign language. In addition, the various Estonian-Swedish areas were so isolated from each other that several dialects developed. Interestingly, linguists have found semantic kinship between the Estonian-Swedish dialects and some archaic dialects in the Dalecarlia (Dalarna) region of Sweden, but also with Icelandic!

Only a few Estonian-Swedes went through higher education, which is why the cultural expressions generally stayed at a folk lore level with local roots, where folk songs and folk dances played an important role. Even within the religious sphere, music was important in the form of hymn singing in the state church and, towards the end of the 19th century and the beginning of the 20th century, when the free-church movement developed, performance of revival songs. Concerning visual arts, the women, above all, produced beautiful art objects in the form of folk costumes, canvases, woven carpets, etc.

The number of Estonian-Swedish poets and fiction writers was very limited during the time when the Estonian-Swedes lived in Estonia, and the number of authors who wrote in the Estonian-Swedish dialect was virtually non-existent. One of few exceptions, however, is the proletarian poet Mats Ekman, who lived 1865-1934. He was a person who fundamentally knew the population, the social conditions and the landscape within the Estonian-Swedish municipality of Rickul (Est. Riguldi) within the Nuckö (Est. Noarootsi) parish, Läänemaa county, and who gave literary expression to this awareness in the form of poems of both serious and humorous embodiment. Mats Ekman's poems became very popular among the Estonian-Swedish common people, especially as Ekman wrote his songs with a rhythmics that made them suitable for singing to simple and well-known melodies. His songs were also often sung when Estonian-Swedes met after their escape to Sweden and other countries.

== Biography ==
=== Early life ===
Viktor Aman has in ("A book about Estonian Swedes”, part 4), presented a life sketch of the poet Mats Ekman, which is here partly reproduced. Much of what is known about Ekman's life came to light during an interview that the Rickul resident Georg Stahl did with the poet during the latter part of his life, an interview which Aman refers to.

As mentioned above, Mats Ekman was born in 1865 on a small farm called Ätsve, located alone in a wooded area in the village of Lucksby situated in Rickul, Nuckö parish in Läänemaa County, Estonia. There he grew up with his parents and four siblings. Due to his birth place, Mats was often given the nickname ”Ätsve Mats”. As a child he often had to herd cattle, a common chore for preschoolers at this time. When he got older, schooling during three winters followed, and after that confirmation teaching.

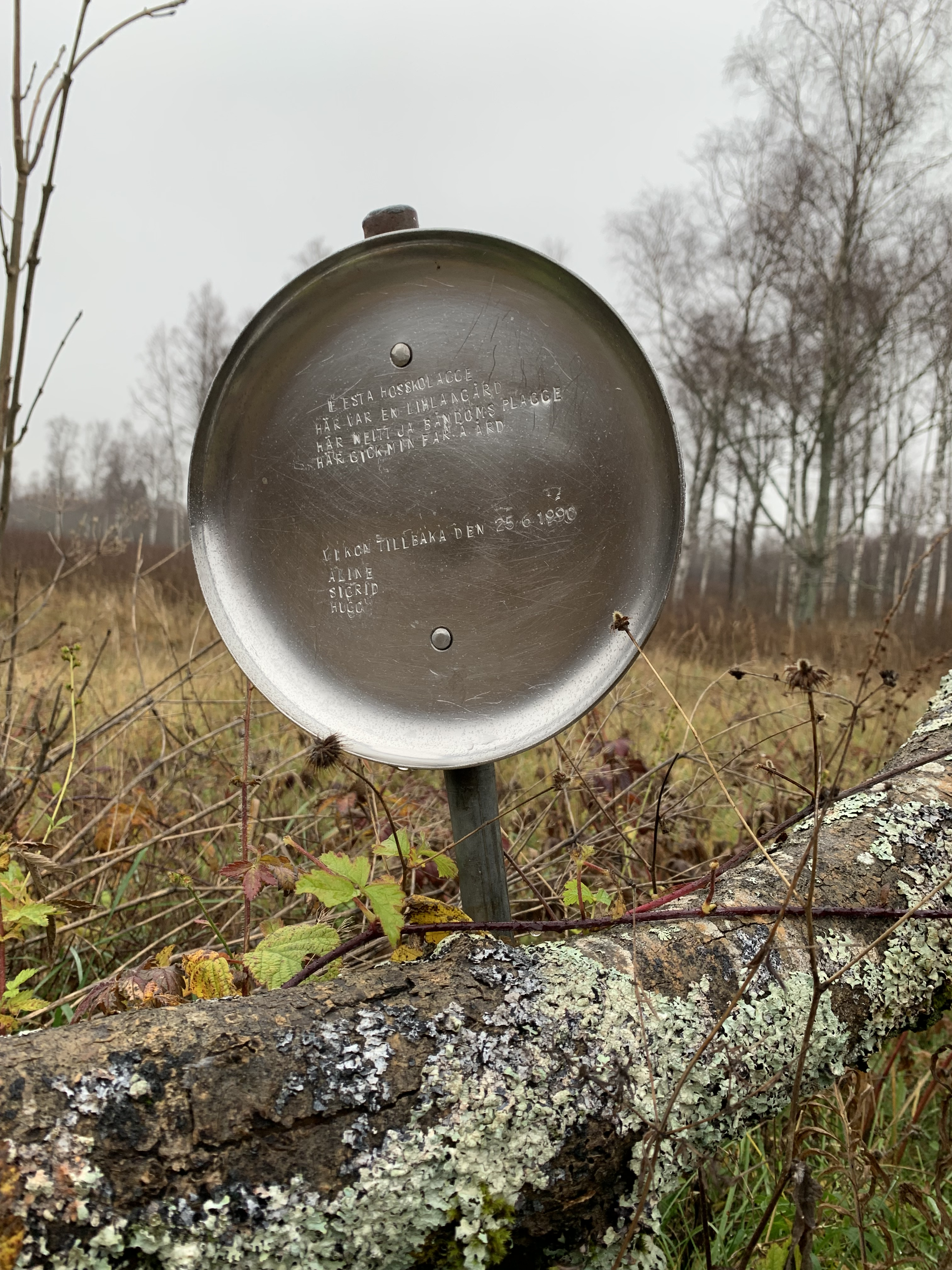
Ätsve, Estonia. Three grandchildren of a brother of Mats Ekman, who were themselves born on the poet's birthplace, put up this memorial plaque on their first trip to Estonia after the country's liberation from the Soviet Union.

At the age of three, Mats had contracted an infectious disease, probably polio. He recovered, but he had suffered permanent paralysis in his right arm. At this time, there was always need for heavy physical work at the country side, and with only one usable arm, there weren't many suitable jobs existing for anyone that much physically disabled. However, one day an official order came that all gates on public roads should be removed. Therefore, a number of cattle guards needed to be employed. The young Mats managed to get such an employment in the village of Harga, and for one summer he sat day and night in a small hut made of straw and reeds, guarding a gate hole. The women of the village brought him food in turn.

=== Youth ===
Mats later ended up at the Rickul manor, where he herded the horses at night and carried mail to and from the small town of Hapsal (Est. Haapsalu) at daytime. The pay was small and the diet limited. The dwelling consisted of a scrub with a bed with long straw in it. A blanket and pillow was brought from his childhood home.

Despite these simple conditions, Mats stayed at the manor for 15 years. He considered later in life that this had been his best time. At the manor he found happy companions and there was always life and movement. To amuse himself and others, he began composing funny "laikar" (songs), and it was during this period that most of his poems were created.

One day Mats had an errand up in the manor's attic. There he found a small office book, half filled in. He tore out the fully written leaves and in this way obtained a book in which he could write down his poems. Until then he had only kept them in memory. He wrote down more than thirty poems, and later he always carried this book with him.

Once when Mats was sailing with the mail across the Hapsal bay in rough weather, he took off his jacket to scoop the boat from water. When finished, he discovered that his book of poems had slipped out of his coat pocket onto the bottom of the boat and gotten soaked. He threw it into the lake in disappointment. Fortunately, he remembered most of the content by heart.

=== Middle age ===
After the fifteen years as a horse keeper and postman, Mats tried his hand as a buyer of rags in the villages, which, however, was not a successful business. Nor did it fare better as a helper to a wandering seller of weaving spoons. Instead, he became a night watchman at Rickul manor, where he stayed until the First World War, when he was about 50 years old. Then Russian dragoons were quartered at the manor, and they had their own guards, which is why Mats became redundant.

After that, Mats returned to herding cattle, this time in the village of Gambyn (Est. Vanaküla) where he served for six summers. Mats was very happy with this period of his life, because the farmers had built a small guard house for him. But then the common pasture was shifted and fenced, which is why Mats again became dismissed.

=== Old age ===
During the last years of his professional life, Mats worked as a school janitor and postman and shared his residence with a female cousin. A friend of Mats urged him to write down the best poems and have them submitted for printing. It became a booklet with 12 poems.

The Swedish priest Sven Danell, who served in Nuckö parish for a few years during the early 1930s, visited Mats Ekman during his old age, when he lived in the municipality's retirement home. Danell asked to see Mats' poems, but he had then lent the poetry booklet to an acquaintance and not received it back. Danell stated that it was the first time he had met a poet who did not even own a copy of his own poems!

Mats Ekman died in the village of Paj in Rickul in the spring of 1934 at the age of 69 years. On 22 June 1990, i.e. 56 years after the poet's death, a memorial stone for Mats Ekman was inaugurated at Roslep's chapel cemetery in Rickul. It was created by the sculptor Tõnis Jõelehts. That the stone is divided symbolizes that the majority of the Estonian-Swedish population fled Estonia during the Second World War, while a minority remained.

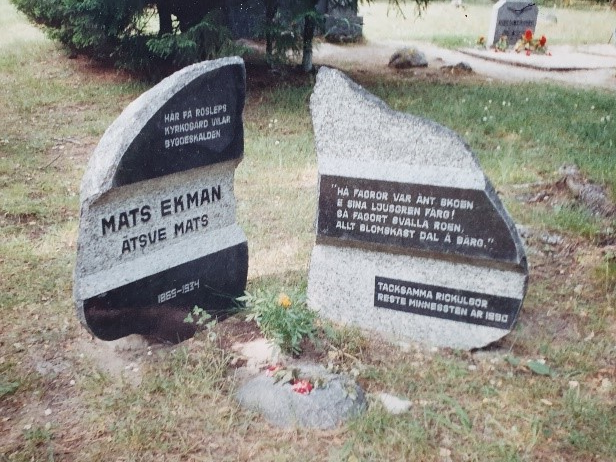
Memorial stone for Mats Ekman at Roslep's chapel cemetery

== Legacy ==
Mats Ekman's poems have mostly circulated handwritten and been sung to simple melodies. A collection of poems by Ekman was, however, published by himself by the influence of the theologian Jacob Blees, schoolmate of Mats, and the linguist Gideon Danell. Without this edition with the title "A rural skald among the old Swedish tribe in Estonia", most of Ekman's poems would probably never have become known to posterity.

Mats Ekman's poems became better known among the public through two small printed booklets published by Birkas Folkhögskola (Birkas´s folk high school) in Nuckö in 1927, "Echoes from the east", and 1929 "Songs from Birkas". The Estonian-Swedes continued to sing Ekman's songs even after their arrival in Sweden, and a number of his poems are included in the songbook, "You beautiful song".

Thanks to records made by Georg Stahl, a larger number of Ekman´s poems, previously unknown to the public, could be issued. A total of 27 poems were published in the journal "Kustbon" (The coastal dweller).

In 2005 a booklet with 45 of Ekman´s poems was published with the title "Båndomshajma (The Childhood Home). Poems by Mats Ekman. A village skald from the Estonian-Swedish community on Estonia's west coast".

Finally, in 2005 also the book "The priest and the howling of wolves" was published enclosing a biography of Mats Ekman and the same 45 poems as in the above “Båndomshajma”.

In the year 2024, the folk musician and music researcher Sofia Joons defended the doctoral thesis "They were strangers and yet relatives. Estonian-Swedish identity formations with songs as tools". In this thesis, a section with an analysis of Mats Ekman's songs is an essential part, where also the musical aspect of Ekman's poetry is highlighted.

== Linguistic analysis ==
Besides Sofia Joons, the two main interpretators of Mats Ekman's poetry are the linguist Edvin Lagman and the historian Elmar Nyman, both born in the same municipality as Mats Ekman and well acquainted with Estonian-Swedish dialects. They have made literary analyzes of Ekman's poetry in the Estonian-Swedish magazine "Kustbon”.

Edvin Lagman writes: "The rural poet submits to a significant limitation by writing in dialect: his circle of readers becomes very limited". Lagman continues: "The understanding becomes incomplete for the outsider, because he cannot live in the dialect's vocabulary". Lagman also emphasizes that a dialect is best able to characterize people and landscape within the area where it is spoken, because it is in this environment that the dialect was formed. Also Elmar Nyman underlines the fact that Mats Ekman's poems above all reflect the poet's childhood and youth memories. He rarely moves outside his own countryside in his poetry.

The motifs in Mats Ekman's poems vary much and can be humorous and indecent, wistfully lyrical or seriously brooding. Social commitment as well as theological and political interest also emerge. Other topics that Ekman's poems highlight are old customs and practices as well as superstitions, themes which are aptly and slightly sarcastically portrayed. The poems can also contain ironic and joking, but also respectful representations of girls in different villages in the province. Also men are described and sometimes joked about, "Kadakasaks" for his arrogance and "Häj" for his laziness. Others, like the sailor "Hans", are portrayed in admiring terms. Love and marriage are other themes. A central, strong poem in Ekman's production is "Kri" ("War"). At the time this poem was written, both the Russo-Japanese War and the First World War were fresh in the minds of the Estonian-Swedish population. The situation of the poor farming people during war time is described concisely and with razor-sharp precision.

As Edvin Lagman points out, the literary expression in Mats Ekman's poems is simple. Elmar Nyman states that three common dance melodies seem to have formed the basis for the verse form and rhythm, and Edvin Lagman gives an example of the verse usage in one of Ekman's poems, "Båndomsminne" ("Childhood memory"). The rhythm is triple iambic and the rhymes are crossed with male and female in every other line. However, the rhymes are not always clean, and Lagman has the impression that Ekman may have deliberately used dirty rhymes to imitate an older, naive form of poetry.

The syntax of the verses plays an important role in Ekman's poetry, and it is noticeable that he rarely violates the natural order of words, which, as Lagman writes, "contributes creating the artistically complete impression that many of his poems do".

Edvin Lagman concludes his literary analysis of Mats Ekman's writing in “Kustbon” no. 3, 1969, by asking himself the question about the content of the poems: "How does Ekman create his overall image?" The answer that Lagman gives is: “Not through detailed logical description, but by highlighting individual, characteristic details in his environment and distinguishing features by the local population. The method of presentation is thus impressionistic.”

Realism is striking in Ekman's poems, which may be connected to the fact that the dialect as such leaves little room for a theoretical-abstract presentation. Lagman emphasizes that by using a colloquial syntax and highly valued folk words and expressions in central places in his poems, a village poet like Mats Ekman creates poems that seem very genuine and thus artistically complete to the people of his own environment. Lagman concludes: "As a work of art, rural poetry can be just as genuine and move just as deeply as the poetic products of a great cultural language."

== Works ==
The only publication that Mats Ekman himself initiated (1924), first after urging of the theologian Jakob Blees, a schoolmate of Mats, together with the linguist Gideon Danell, was a booklet with the title En bygdeskald bland den gamla svenska folkstammen i Estland ("A rural skald among the old Swedish tribe in Estonia"). The booklet which included 12 of Ekman´s poems was submitted by Göteborgs Kungliga Vetenskaps- och Vitterhetssamhälles handlingar (Gothenburg's Royal Academy of Science and Wit).
