= Matti Pohto =

- Born: 7 March 1817; Isokyrö, Grand Duchy of Finland, Russian Empire
- Died: 30 July 1857 (aged 40); Vyborg, Grand Duchy of Finland, Russian Empire
- Cause of death: Murder
- Resting place: Ristimäki Cemetery, Vyborg
- Monuments: Matti Pohto Memorial, National Library of Finland courtyard
- Other name: Kirja-Matti
- Occupations: Bookbinder; Book collector; Book peddler
- Known for: Saving a substantial portion of pre-19th-century Finnish literature following the Great Fire of Turku
- Partner(s): Emanuel Kanajärvi (philanthropic and collection associate)

Matti Pohto (1817-1857) was a book collector in the Russian Empire.

He was bor 7 March 1817 in Isokyrö, in Finland. He died 30 July 1857) in Vyborg, Grand Duchy of Finland. He was a Finnish bookbinder and book collector. Pohto was an uneducated man of peasant stock who is known for his collection that saved a significantly large number of pre-19th century Finnish literature.

== Life ==
Pohto was born into a poor peasant family in the Western Finnish Ostrobothnia region. At the age of eight, Pohto worked as a herder and also earned his living by begging. Later, he worked as a bookbinder and started collecting books in 1838 at the age of 21. Pohto acquired most of his books from manor houses and vicarages throughout Finland.

In 1847, he got to know Fredrik Wilhelm Pipping, the librarian of the Royal Academy of Turku. The library had been destroyed in the 1827 Great Fire of Turku. With Pohto's assistance, Pipping succeeded in collecting almost all Finnish literature printed thus far and re-established the library collection in the nation's new capital Helsinki. In 1857, Pipping published a bibliography of Finnish literature, about 5,000 of 6,603 titles of these were collected by Pohto. His books are now in the collections of the National Library of Finland.

Pohto was murdered in July 1857 on his way to Saint Petersburg. He was staying at a farmhouse in the village of Nuoraa, near Vyborg, and was killed by a farmhand. The man struck Pohto on the head with an axe: he had been coughed on by Pohto and, fearful of contracting tuberculosis, was panicked into the violent act. Pohto was buried in the Ristimäki Cemetery in Vyborg, in present-day Russia. In 1988, his memorial was moved to Helsinki, where it was placed in the courtyard of the University of Helsinki library.
