= Pocerski Metković =

Pocerski Metković Поцерски Метковић (Serbian)
- Village (Selo)
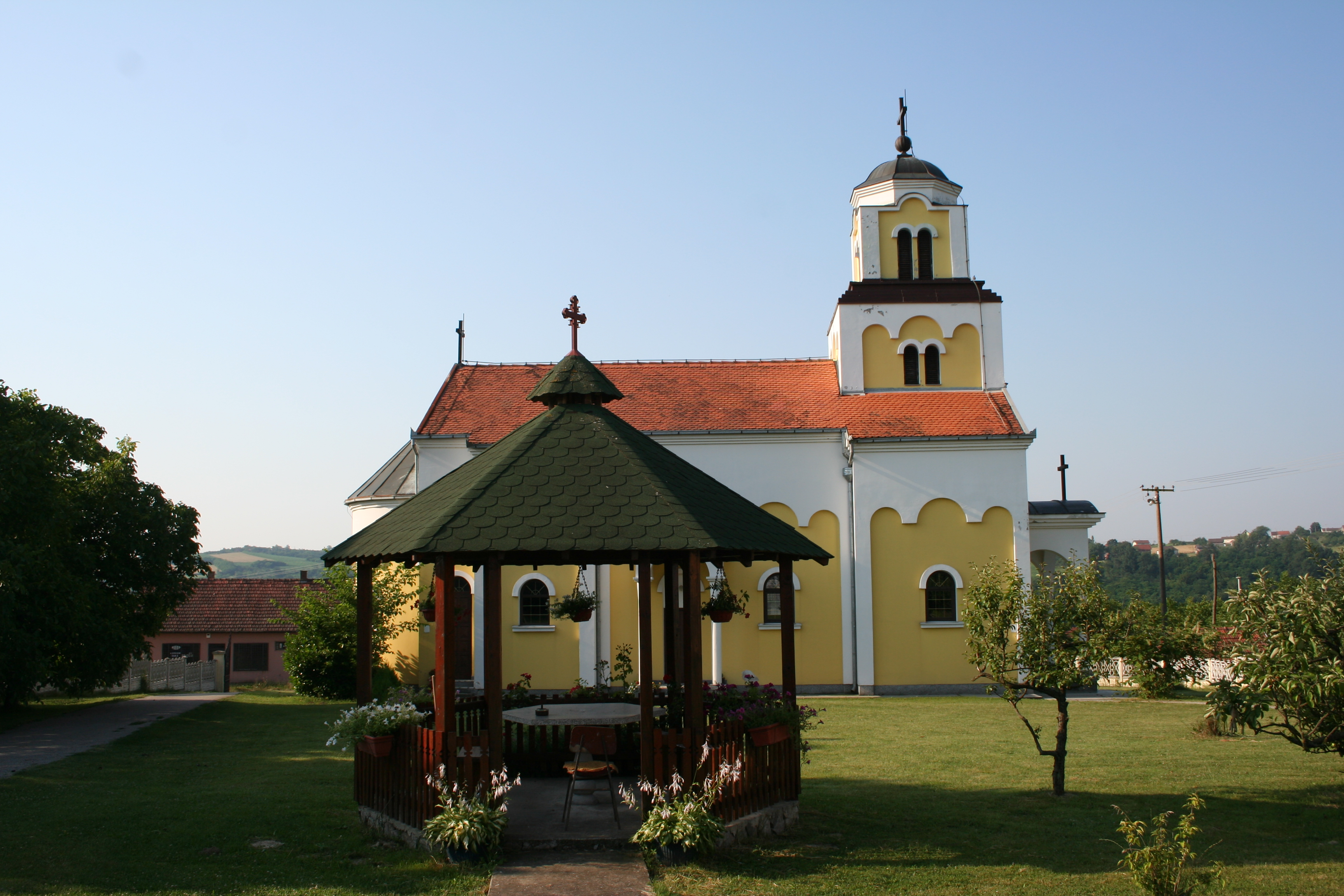

- Location within Serbia
- Coordinates: 44°39′30″N 19°37′12″E
- Country: Serbia
- District: Mačva District
- Municipality: Šabac

Population (2002)
  - Total: 857
- Time zone: UTC+1 (CET)
  - Summer (DST): UTC+2 (CEST)

Pocerski Metković (Serbian Cyrillic: Поцерски Метковић) is a village in the municipality of Šabac, Serbia. According to the 2002 census, the village has a population of 857 people.
