= Matti Kuusimäki =

Finnish lawyer (born 1943)

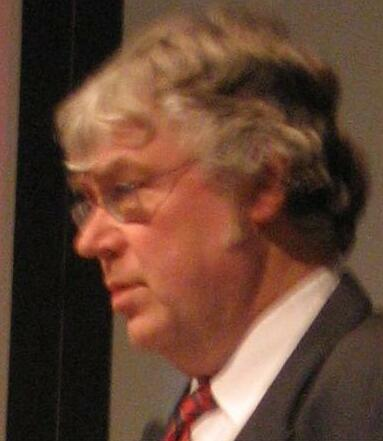
Matti Kuusimäki

Matti Kuusimäki (born May 3, 1943 in Turku) is the former Prosecutor General of Finland. In 2010, he was succeeded by Matti Nissinen.
