= Matti Haapoja =

Finnish serial killer

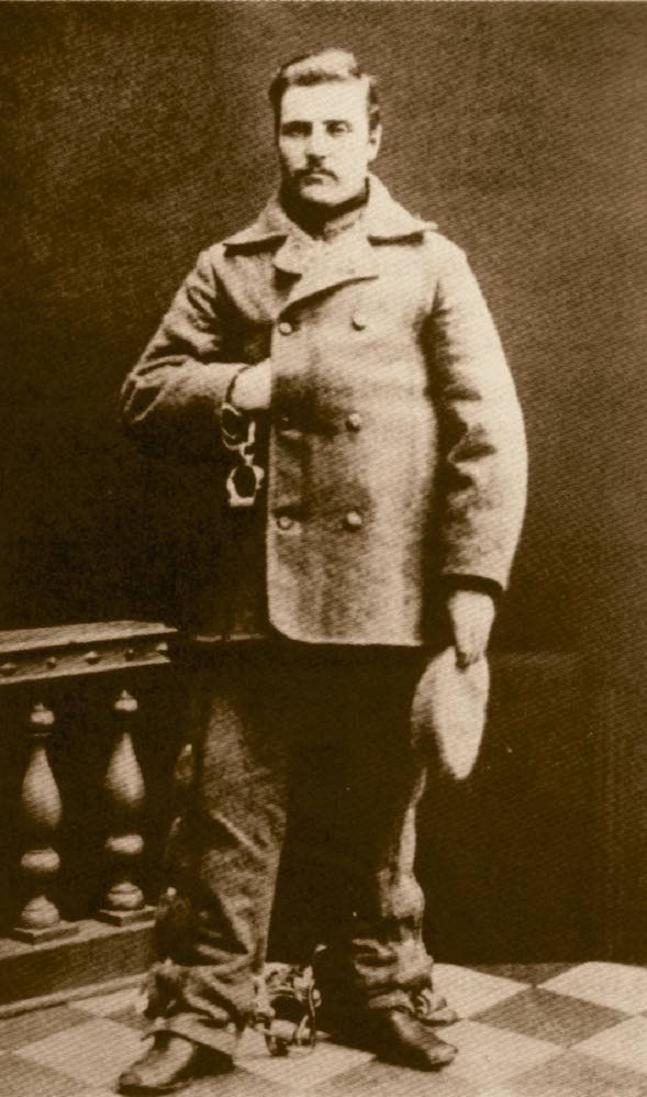
- Born: Matti Haapoja; September 16, 1845; Isokyrö, Finland
- Died: January 8, 1895 (aged 49); Turku, Finland
- Cause of death: Suicide by hanging
- Penalty: Life imprisonment

Details
- Victims: 3 confirmed
- Span of crimes: 1867–1894
- Country: Finland

Matti Haapoja (September 16, 1845 in Isokyrö – January 8, 1895 in Turku) was a Finnish serial killer who was covered extensively by the press at the time of the murders. The exact number of his victims is unknown. He was convicted of two murders and was scheduled for a trial for his third murder when he killed himself in his cell. He can be linked to seven other identified murder cases, but most of those happened during his exile in Siberia and are poorly documented, so his involvement is not certain. It is claimed that he confessed to 18 murders, but there are no details about this supposed confession, and the figure should be regarded as unreliable. Some sources estimate his total number of murders as 22–25. He also non-fatally wounded at least six men in knife fights.

== Early life ==
Matti Haapoja was born in 1845, in Isokyrö, Grand duchy of Finland, the son of a farmer. Haapoja started his criminal career as a brawler, graduating quickly to stealing horses. His first known murder happened on December 6, 1867, when he stabbed his drinking partner Heikki Impponen in a drunken brawl. He was sentenced to serve 12 years in prison at Turku for his murder. During the next 10 years, he escaped from prison four times, spending months at large on each occasion. Around this time he gained great notoriety as a jail-breaker and a thief. His fame as a robber started to grow after the newspapers reported that he had robbed and shot at Esa Nyrhinen on August 12, 1876. Later it was found that Nyrhinen had been hiding Haapoja at his home and the men had had an argument.

== Murders ==
As a result of his escapes and continued thievery, Haapoja was sentenced to life in prison in 1874. After his last escape, he petitioned for his sentence to be changed to an exile to Siberia. This was accepted and he was sent to Omsk oblast in 1880. During his stay there, he is reputed to have killed a man in 1886, after which he was exiled to East Siberia. Folk stories claim that during this time Haapoja killed two other famous Finnish criminals, Juha Antinpoika Leskenantti (a.k.a. Anssin Jukka) and Kaappo Sutki, but these tales are likely false as they offer no conclusive proof.

Around 1889, Haapoja decided to escape Siberia and return to Finland. He later claimed that he intended to emigrate to America. He raised money for this escape by committing a series of robberies and murders. He probably killed at least three men and was involved in the murder of a fourth. He also obtained a passport that belonged to a Russian man whose fate remains unclear.

Haapoja returned to Finland in September 1890. A month later, he murdered and robbed a prostitute, Jemina Salo. He was captured at Porvoo a couple of days later and recognized. At his trial Haapoja behaved arrogantly, confessing to this murder as well as to one of the murders he had committed in Siberia. He hoped that he would be sent back to Siberia but instead, the court gave him a second life term in prison.

On October 10, 1894, Haapoja tried to escape from prison yet again. During this attempt, he killed a guard and wounded two others. When he realized that he couldn't get out, he attempted to commit suicide by stabbing himself, but the wound was not fatal. However, as soon as he had recovered from the self-inflicted stabbing wound, he hanged himself in his cell on January 8, 1895. His skeleton was kept in the Museum of Crime in Vantaa for a long time, until he was finally buried in Ylistaro in 1995.

Writer Kaijus Ervasti wrote a book about Matti Haapoja called Murhamiehen muotokuva – Matti Haapoja 1845–1895 ("Portrait of a murderer – Matti Haapoja 1845–1895").

== Victims ==
=== Confirmed ===
- Farmer Heikki Antinpoika Impponen, who was stabbed to death on December 6, 1867.
- Prostitute Maria Jemina Salo, strangled on October 8, 1890.
- Prison guard Juho Rosted, stabbed on October 10, 1894.

=== Possible ===
- Farmers Matti Heikkilä and Hermanni Hautamäki who were clubbed to death by an unidentified man at Hämeenkyrö on November 15, 1869. Haapoja was in the area at the time and years later he confessed to an unspecified murder "that had happened in November 1869".
- An unknown man who was killed in Siberia in 1886.
- A convict identified only as "Jaakko H." from Alajärvi, Finland, who was killed in Siberia in 1888.
- Estonian barkeeper Rugis was killed by Haapoja in Tomsk in 1889.
- "Rich-Matti" Kuivalainen, who was killed in Tomsk in 1889.
- Estonian convict Gustaf Sepp vanished without trace in Simonjovka, Siberia, in 1889, after he was last seen in the company of Haapoja.

It is possible there were more victims, but only these ten cases can be identified as certain or probable.

=== Attempts ===
- Brawler Juho Tenkku who was stabbed around Christmas, 1866.
- Farmer Hermanni Hösö was stabbed on December 6, 1867.
- Farmer Esa Nyrhinen was shot three times (twice in the leg, once in the face) on August 12, 1876.
- A farmer identified as "Koivuniemi from Vähäkyrö" who was stabbed when Haapoja was apprehended after his last prison escape in January 1879.
- Prison guards Juho Jernvall and Sven Nyman were stabbed during Haapoja's last escape attempt.

During his last escape, he had a chance to attack one more guard, but did not, because this guard had always been nice to the prisoners.

== See also ==
- List of serial killers by country
  - Juhani Aataminpoika
