= Mateus de Brito Júnior =

Angolan government minister

Mateus de Brito Júnior was the Angolan minister for public works and urbanization in the 1994 government of José Eduardo dos Santos.
