= Matti Seppälä =

Finnish geomorphologist (1941–2020)

Matti Kullervo Seppälä (5 September 1941 in Vaasa – 24 November 2020 in Hämeenlinna) was a Finnish geomorphologist specialized in cold climate aeolian processes.

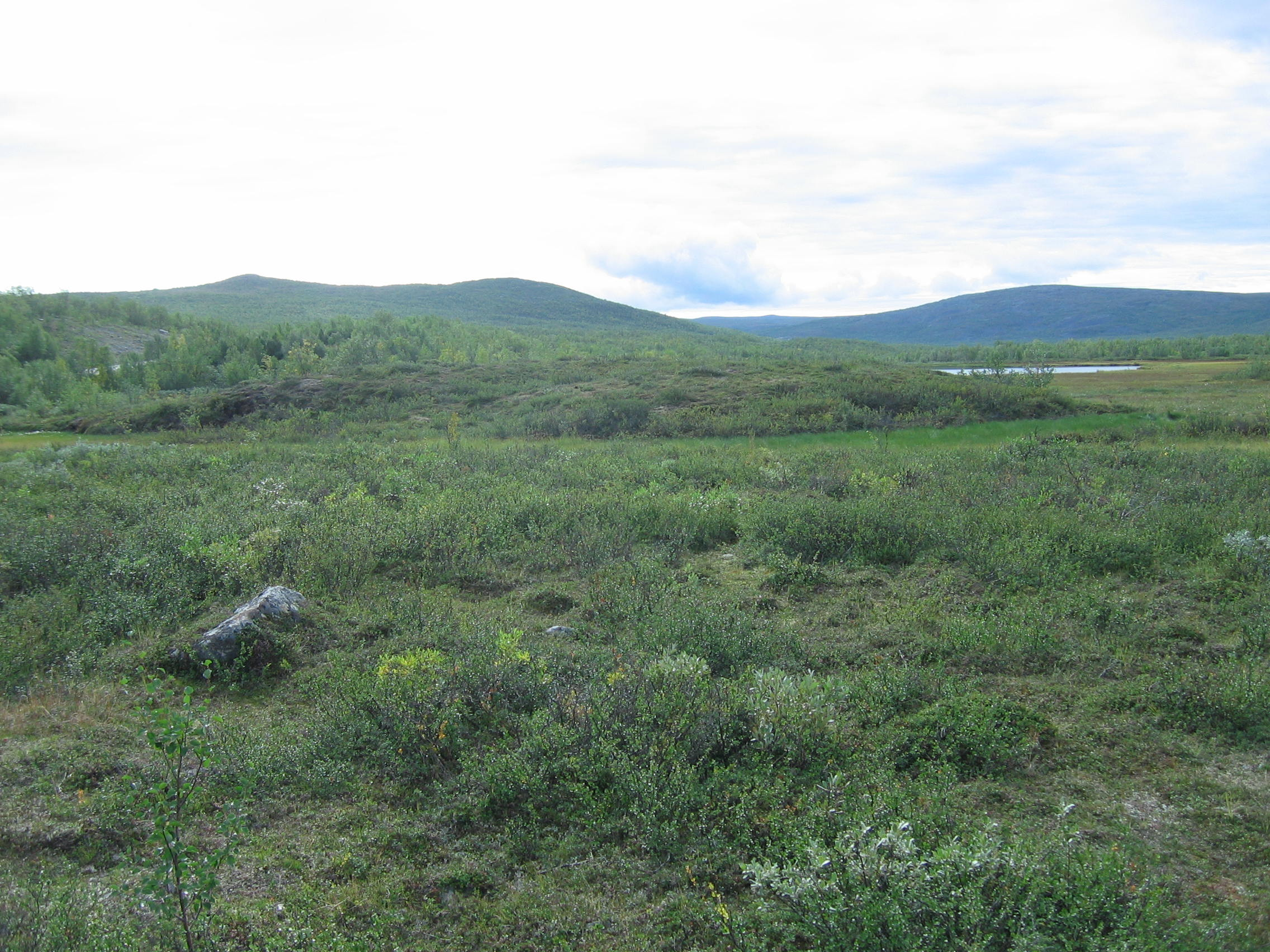
Palsa bog in Enontekiö, Finland.

Seppälä obtained a Ph.D. at the University of Turku in 1971 and moved to work at the University of Oulu. In 1978, he moved to the University of Helsinki and served as professor of physical geography from 1978 to 2009.

Matti Seppälä was also a research fellow at Uppsala University, Université de Montréal, University of Cambridge and Durham University. Seppälä got a one-year Humboldt grant by the German Research Foundation as guest professor at the Heidelberg University in 1977/78. Seppälä was the national representative for Finland in the International Permafrost Association for almost 20 years.

Palsas, as permafrost phenomena were generally known in northern Finland and Sweden since the beginning of the 20th century. Seppälä did detailed palsa studies especially in the 1980s, and he became a foremost expert on palsas.

He was also the first Scandinavian geomorphologist initiating permafrost research in the mountains of northern Finland in the year 1985, together with German colleagues. Many other scientists followed this research approach of mapping and modelling mountain permafrost in Scandinavia.
