= Matko =

Matko is a Croatian given name and surname that may refer to:

Given name

- Matko Babić (born 1998), Croatian football player
- Matko Djarmati (born 1982), Croatian football player
- Matko Jelavić (born 1958), Croatian singer, songwriter, composer and drummer
- Matko Laginja (1852–1930), Croatian lawyer and politician
- Matko Obradović (born 1991), Croatian football goalkeeper
- Matko Perdijić (born 1982), Croatian football goalkeeper
- Matko Talovac, Governor of Slavonia from 1435 to 1445
- Matko Vekić (born 1970), Croatian painter

Surname

- Matija Matko (born 1982), Croatian football player

== See also ==
- Matthew (given name)
