= Mati Kepp =

Estonian politician (born 1947)

Mati Kepp (born 11 September 1947) is an Estonian politician. He was a member of X Riigikogu, representing the People's Union of Estonia.

== Early life and education ==
Kepp was born in Äksi Parish (now part of Tartu Parish). In 1971, he graduated from the Estonian University of Life Sciences with a degree in agronomy.

== Acknowldegements ==
- Order of the White Star, IV Class (2006)
