= Mattie Griffith Browne =

American novelist and suffragist

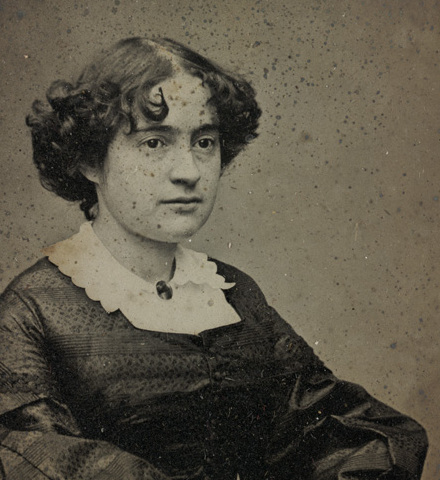
- Born: Martha Grifith; October 2, 1828; Owensboro, Kentucky, U.S.
- Died: May 25, 1906 (aged 77); Boston, Massachusetts, U.S.
- Occupations: Abolitionist; Suffragist
- Writing career
- Notable works: Autobiography of a Female Slave; Madge Vertner

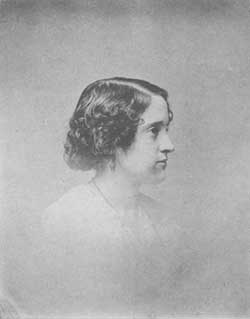
Mattie Griffith Browne, c.1880

Martha "Mattie" Griffith Browne (October 2, 1828 – 25 May 1906) was an anti-slavery novelist and American suffragist.

== Early life ==
Griffith Browne was born in Owensboro, Kentucky, to father Thomas Griffith and mother Martha "Mattie" Young. However, Griffith would soon be orphaned. Her mother, Martha Griffith, died during childbirth and by 1830 her father, Thomas Griffith, had died as well. After 1830, the young Mattie Griffith and her sister Catherine were cared for by their extended Griffith family; but specifically, by their Grandfather Caleb Griffith on their Daviess County, Kentucky homestead.

Griffith spent her childhood between Owensboro, Kentucky and Louisville, Kentucky where she would later remove after the death of her Grandfather Caleb Griffith in 1846.

== Literary career ==
=== Poetry ===
By 1850, Griffith spend the majority of her time in Louisville, Kentucky and was a regular poetry contributor to George D. Prentice's Louisville Daily Courier, a forerunner of the better know Louisville Journal. With her growing notoriety as a poet, in 1852, Griffith published her first collection of poetry, titled simply, Poems by Mattie Griffith.

=== Anti-Slavery Fiction ===
Griffith is best known for her novel, Autobiography of a Female Slave, published in 1856. Set in a fictional Kentucky location modeled off of the Owensboro and Daviess County, Kentucky of her childhood, Griffith recounted her personal experiences during her childhood through the voice of the enslaved woman Ann.

This novel helped bolster Griffith's image and elevated her role in the American Anti-Slavery Movement during the late 1850s. After publication, Autobiography gained the attention of influential abolitionists such as William Lloyd Garrison, Wendell Phillips, and Lydia Maria Child.

Another one of Griffith's notable works is a serialized novel, Madge Vertner, which was serialized in the National Anti-Slavery Standard from July 1859 to May 1860.

During the Civil War, Griffith composed Ratie: A True Story of a Little Hunchback which was also serialized in the National Anti-Slavery Standard in 1862.

== Activism ==
=== Abolition ===
Griffith was born into a wealthy, slaveholding family. After she was orphaned in 1830, she inherited half a dozen enslaved persons from her father's estate. Much of her anti-slavery ideology developed from and was based on the experiences from her childhood. However, in spite of her former slave-holding status, she became an abolitionist and advocated for emancipation in her writing.

Griffith was heavily involved in the American Anti-Slavery Society as a speaker and a propagandist. Griffith worked with other abolitionist women, such as Maria Weston Chapman, in anti-slavery fundraising efforts; specifically, the National Anti-Slavery Bazaars. These bazaars were the main fundraiser for the American Anti-Slavery Society.

Griffith's main role in the American anti-slavery movement was as an author of anti-slavery fiction. Her works such as Autobiography of a Female Slave, Madge Vertner, and Ratie: A True Story of a Little Hunchback, the former published and the two latter were serialized in the National Anti-Slavery Standard. Her writing highlighted moral arguments against slavery and promoted equality among races.

=== Women's Suffrage ===
Griffith took an active role in women's activism. Exposure to women's rights activists in the abolition movement helped develop Griffith's views on women's rights. In 1863, Griffith joined the Women's National Loyal League which advocated for women's rights but also for emancipation and universal suffrage during the Civil War.

=== Education Reform ===
In 1894 she was able to provide lodgings for Anna B. Eckstein who was then working as a teacher in Boston, but would go on be a notable pacifist.

== Travel Abroad ==
Griffith traveled to Europe in 1860 and returned to the United States in 1861.

== Personal life ==
On June 27, 1867, Griffith Browne married the journalist, abolitionist, and banker Albert Gallatin Browne Jr., in New York City. Her husband was the son of Albert G. Browne and mother Sarah J. Cox.

She died on May 25, 1906, from breast cancer, and is buried in Harmony Grove Cemetery in Salem, Massachusetts.

== Works and publications ==
- Browne, Martha Griffith (1853). Poems by Mattie Griffith. New York: D. Appleton & Company. hdl:2027/hvd.hx5a56. OCLC 256758586.
- Browne, Martha Griffith (1857). Autobiography of a Female Slave. New York: Redfield. OCLC 50822597.
- Browne, Martha Griffith (20 December 1862). "Ratie: A True Story of a Little Hunchback". National Anti-Slavery Standard. Vol. XXIII, no. 32. OCLC 53102768. Archived from the original on 18 September 2016.
- Browne, Martha Griffith (15 August 1863). "Letter: Not Slavery and a Truce, but Emancipation and Peace". National Anti-Slavery Standard. Vol. XXIV, no. 14. OCLC 53102638.
