= Mathus =

Mathus is a surname. Notable people with the surname include:

- Didier Mathus, French politician, member of the National Assembly of France
- Jimbo Mathus, American singer-songwriter and musician
