= Michel Mathieu =

Michel Mathieu may refer to:

- Michel Mathieu (French politician) (1944–2010), High Commissioner of the Republic in French Polynesia
- Michel Mathieu (Canadian politician) (1838–1916), lawyer, judge and member of the Canadian House of Commons

== See also ==
- Michael Mathieu (born 1984), Bahamian sprinter
