= Matti Hannola =

Finnish politician (born 1939)

Matti Hannola (born 12 February 1939 in Viipuri) is a Finnish farmer and politician. He was a Member of the Parliament of Finland from March to September 1975, representing the Finnish People's Unity Party (SKYP).
