= Matti Wasama =

Finnish ice hockey player

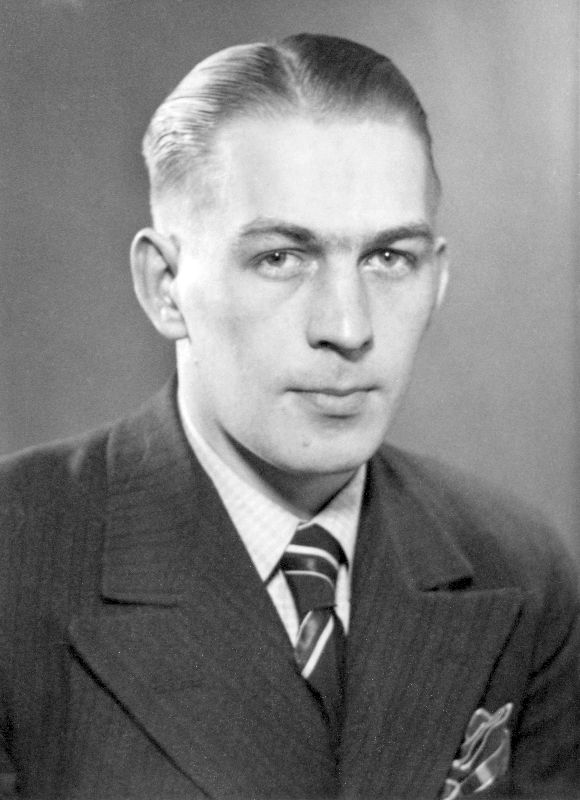
- Born: January 14, 1918 Tampere, Finland
- Died: July 10, 1970 (aged 52) Tampere, Finland
- Position: Forward
- Shot: Left
- Played for: Ilves; TaPa
- Playing career: 1935–1946

Matti Wasama (January 14, 1918, in Tampere, Finland – July 10, 1970, in Tampere, Finland) was a former ice hockey forward who played for Ilves. Matti Wasama was the father of Jarmo Wasama, one of the most promising ice hockey defensemen of his time.

== Playing career ==
Matti Wasama played in SM-liiga from 1935 to 1946. Wasama won the SM-Liga championship three times while he played for Ilves.

Matti Wasama also played for TaPa before he retired in 1946.

== Death of Jarmo Wasama ==
Matti Wasama along with his son, Jarmo, were driving home in February 1966, when their car suddenly struck a stalled tractor in foggy weather. Matti Wasama sustained heavy injuries while his son died despite attempts to revive him in hospital.

Matti Wasama never got over the accident and was deeply depressed until his death in 1970.
