= Mait (given name) =

Male given name

- Gender: Male
- Language: Estonian
- Name day: 24 February

Origin
- Region of origin: Estonia

Mait is an Estonian masculine given name.

People named Mait include:

- Mait Klaassen (born 1955), veterinary scientist and politician
- Mait Kõiv (born 1961), historian (:et)
- Mait Künnap (born 1982), tennis player
- Mait Laas (born 1970), animated film director
- Mait Lepik (born 1968), actor, cinematographer
- Mait Mäekivi (born 1959), cinematographer
- Mait Malmsten (born 1972), actor
- Mait Maltis (born 1951), singer
- Mait Mihkel Mathiesen (1949–2005), politician
- Mait Metsanurk (1879–1957), writer
- Mait Müntel (born 1977), physicist (:et)
- Mait Patrail (born 1988), handball player
- Mait Püümets (1882–1965), physician and politician
- Mait Raun (born 1963), writer
- Mait Riisman (1956–2018), water polo player
- Mait Vaik (born 1969), rock musician and writer
