= Matīss Akuraters =

Latvian musician – percussionist (born 1982)

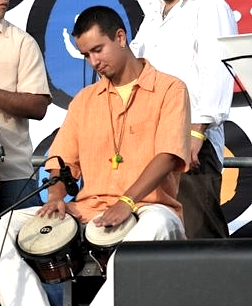
Akuraters performing at the Riga City Festival 2009

Matīss Akuraters (born June 7, 1982) is a Latvian musician – percussionist.

== Biography ==
Akuraters was born June 7, 1982, in Riga, Latvian SSR, Soviet Union. His mother Ieva Akuratere is a well-known Latvian musician; his father Sergejs Akuraters is a photographer.

In his childhood Matīss Akuraters studied piano and clarinet in music school. Akuraters's professional musical career began at age of 16 when he started collaboration with hip hop artists such as Gustavo and Ozols. Later he and his friends DJ Krii and Elvi formed their own hiphop crew "Ritmiņš", in which Akuraters played an Mc role. They recorded songs and played concerts all around the Latvia.

In age of 18 he began studying percussion, and his first instrument turn out to be the tabla – well known Indian percussion. Akuraters learned the tabla in London at The Bharatiya Vidya Bhavan, UK centre and also from jazz musician, drummer and percussionist Brian Melvin.

In 2003 the band Lidojošais Paklājs (The Flying Carpet) is being formed. In 2004 for three years Matīss Akuraters was performing in Gaļina Poļiščuka's musical play "Pūt Vējiņi" at the Latvian National Theatre. This play took part in many foreign theatre festivals in Germany, Moscow, Denmark and Croatia, where the play got award for best music.

Love for percussion led Matīss Akuraters to rich world of Brazilian music. He was fascinated by Brazil's culture so much that in year 2008 he finally fulfilled his dream and went to Brazil to improve his percussionist skills and learn Brazilian culture.

Akuraters spent three months in Brazil, Rio de Janeiro, meeting great artists and contributing his percussion skills at local percussionists community authority – Jaguara, who is a percussionist of current samba king Zeca Pagodinho. Akuraters also learned from Rio's carioca, famous sambista Andreazo and local percussionist from Brasília Tiago Loei.

A few months later after returning from Brazil, Matīss Akuraters organized a Brazilian percussion workshops in Riga and invited Tiago Loei and Andreazo to participate. After successful workshops they formed a group of percussionists "Afro Brasilian Drums".

Matīss Akuraters was participating in various recordings and played with well-known Latvian musicians and bands such as: Haralds Sīmanis, Amber(Aija Vītoliņa), Aivars Hermanis, Ieva Akuratere, Ilze Grunte, El Mars, Samba de Riga, Forshpil, Lidojošais Paklājs (The Flying Carpet), 7th Floor, Diana Pīrāgs, Afro Brazilian Drums.

In year 2008 "Lidojošais Paklājs" (The Flying Carpet) was nominated for the best alternative music album in Latvian Music Awards for the album "Lidojošais Paklājs".

In 2012, Matīss Akuraters joined Latvian indie-rock band Them Lemons as a drummer. The band is not currently active.

In 2014, he recorded CD with choir "Mūza" and went on tour in France, Provence. In 2014, he joined Guitarist Gatis Ziema to record an album, currently band is on high demand, playing live concerts in 2015.

Akuraters spent 5 months in India, deepening his knowledge of playing tabla.
