= List of people with given name Matthew =

This is a list of people with the given name Matthew (sometimes shortened to Matt):

== List ==
- Pope Matthew of Alexandria (disambiguation), multiple people
- Saint Matthew, one of the twelve apostles of Jesus

=== A ===
- Matthew Adams (American football) (born 1995), American football player
- Matthew Adler (born 1962), American law professor
- Matthew Agarwala (born 1986), British economist
- Matthew Algie (1810–1902), British coffee roaster
- Matt Anderson (disambiguation), multiple people
- Matthew Andrews, electrical engineer
- Matthew Anoaʻi (1970–2017), American wrestler known as Rosey
- Matthew Aquino (born 1996), Filipino-Japanese basketball player
- Matthew Arbuckle Jr. (1778–1851), American soldier
- Matthew Arnold (1822–1888), English poet and cultural critic
- Matthew Arnone (born 1994), Canadian soccer player

=== B ===
- Matthew Barzun, American politician
- Matthew Bate, Australian footballer
- Matthew Bate (filmmaker), Australian filmmaker
- Matthew Batten (born 1995), American baseball player
- Mat Baynton (born 1980), English actor and musician
- Mat Beard (disambiguation), several people
- Matt Bellamy (born 1978), English musician
- Matt Bennett (born 1991), American actor
- Matthew Bergeron (born 2000), Canadian gridiron player
- Matt Berry (born 1974), English actor
- Matthew Betz (1881–1938), American film actor
- Matthew Boling, US sprinter, US HS 100 m record holder
- Matt Bomer (born 1977), American actor
- Matthew Boulton (1728–1809), British manufacturer
- Matthew Boyd (disambiguation), multiple people
- Matthew Bozinovski (born 2001), Australian footballer
- Matthew Brady (disambiguation), multiple people
- Matt Brown (disambiguation), multiple people
- Matthew Brettingham (1699–1769), English architect
- Matthew Broderick (born 1962), American film and stage actor
- Matthew Broome, British actor

=== C ===
- Matthew Cameron (born 1985), Australian Paralympic athletics competitor
- Matthew Camp (born 1984), American gay pornographic film actor and social media personality
- Matthew Cantore (born 1976), United States Space Force brigadier general
- Matthew Carey (1760–1839), American publisher and economist
- Matthew Carter (born 1937), typeface designer
- Matthew Carter (diver) (born 2000), Australian diver
- Matthew G. Carter (1913–2012), first African-American mayor of Montclair, New Jersey
- Matthew Carmona, British architect, planner and researcher
- Matthew Casey (born 1999), English professional footballer
- Matthew Causey (born 1953), American academic, singer-songwriter and actor
- Matthew Cavanaugh (born 1956), American professional football player and coach
- Matthew Caws (born 1967), American singer, songwriter and guitarist
- Matt Centrowitz, middle-distance runner, US Olympic Gold Medalist in 2016 Rio 1500m
- Matthew Centrowitz Jr. (born 1989), American middle-distance runner
- Matthew Charlton (1866–1948), Australian politician
- Matthew Chadwick (born 1990), horse racing jockey in Hong Kong
- Matthew Cheung, Hong Kong Chief Secretary for Administration
- Matthew A. Cherry (born 1981), American film director, writer, producer, and American football player
- Matthew Chizhov (1838–1916), Russian sculptor
- Matthew Chojnacki (born 1975), American writer on film and music
- Matthew H. Clark (1937–2023), American prelate of the Roman Catholic Church
- Matthew Clarke, several people
- Matthew Clarkson (1758–1825), American colonial soldier and politician
- Matthew Clarkson (mayor) (1733–1800), American former mayor of Philadelphia
- Matthew Clay (1754–1815), American lawyer, planter, army officer, and politician
- Matthew Clerk (1659–1735), Irish Presbyterian minister
- Matthew Cobb (born 1957), British zoologist and professor
- Matthew Cooper (disambiguation), multiple people
- Matthew Cormack, Australian filmmaker
- Matthew Coronato (born 2002), American ice hockey player
- Matthew Cox (disambiguation), several people
- Matthew Cowles (1944–2014), American actor and playwright
- Matthew Cowley, American Latter-day Saint apostle
- Matthew Cradock (died 1641), British merchant, politician, and the first governor of the Massachusetts Bay Company
- Matthew Crampton (born 1986), English track cyclist
- Matthew Croucher (born 1983), British member of the Royal Marines Reserve and recipient of the George Cross
- Matthew Crosby (born 1980), English comedian and writer
- Matthew Crum (born 1978), American drummer

=== D ===
- Matthew Daddario (born 1987), American actor
- Matt Damon (born 1970), American actor
- Matt Darwin (born 1963), American football player
- Matthew Davies (disambiguation), multiple people
- Matthew Davis (disambiguation), multiple people
- Matthew Dayes (born 1994), American football player
- Matthew Deane (born 1978), Thai singer, actor and television presenter
- Matthew Delisi (born 2000), American professional Overwatch player known as Supertf
- Matthew Dellavedova (born 1990), Australian basketball player
- Matthew Dubé (born 1988), Canadian politician
- Matt Duchene (born 1991), Canadian ice hockey player
- Mathew Dumba (born 1994), Canadian ice hockey player
- Matthew Dunn (born 1973), Australian freestyle and medley swimmer

=== E ===
- Matthew Earnest (born 1969), American theater director
- Matthew George Easton (1823–1894), Scottish Presbyterian preacher and writer
- Matthew Ebden (born 1987), Australian professional tennis player
- Matthew of Edessa (died 1144), Armenian historian
- Matthew Edgar (born 1986), English professional darts player
- Matthew Edison, Canadian actor
- Matthew Edwards (footballer) (1882–1944), footballer
- Matthew Egan (born 1983), former Australian rules footballer
- Matthew Ehlers, American film director, producer, and screenwriter
- Matthew Elderfield (born 1966), Deputy Governor and Head of Financial Regulation at the Central Bank of Ireland
- Matthew van Eldik, Paralympic athletics competitor from Australia
- Matthew Elias (born 1979), Welsh athlete, specialised in the 400 m sprint and 400 m hurdles
- Matthew Elliott (cricketer) (born 1971), Australian former cricketer
- Matthew Elliott (footballer) (born 1968), former professional footballer
- Matthew Elliott (loyalist) (1739–1814), born in County Donegal, Ireland, died in Burlington, Ontario
- Matthew Elliott (politics) (born 1978), British political strategist and lobbyist
- Matthew Elliott (rugby league) (born 1964), Australian professional rugby league football coach and former player
- Matthew Ellis (American musician) of A Hope for Home in Portland, Oregon
- Matthew Emerton (born 1971), Australian mathematician, professor of mathematics at the University of Chicago
- Matthew Gault Emery (1818–1901), the twenty-first Mayor of Washington, D.C.
- Matthew Emmons (born 1981), American rifle shooter
- Matthew Engel (born 1951), British writer, journalist and editor
- Matthew England, physical oceanographer and climate scientist
- Matthew Entenza (born 1961), Minnesota lawyer and former politician
- Matthew Erickson, Canadian voice actor who works for Ocean Studios and Blue Water Studios
- Matthew Etherington (born 1981), English former footballer
- Matthew Etzel (born 2002), American baseball player
- Matthew Evans (cricketer) (born 1974), former English cricketer
- Matthew Evers (born 1976), American pair skater, model and TV personality
- Matthew Ewing (1815–1874), American carpenter and inventor
- Matthew Eyles (born 1979), English cricketer
- Matthew J. Eyring (born 1933), American educational administrator, author, and religious leader

=== F ===
- Matthew Falder (born 1988), English convicted serial sex offender and blackmailer
- Matthew Feldman (1919–1994), American politician
- Matthew Festa (born 1993), American baseball player
- Matthew Festing (1949–2021), English Roman Catholic official
- Matthew Fetherstonhaugh (c.1714–1774), English politician and landowner
- Matthew Fletcher (disambiguation), multiple people
- Matthew Flinders (1774–1814), English navigator and cartographer
- Matthew Forbes, American tennis player
- Matthew Forgues, American racewalker
- Matthew Forde (born 2002) Barbados and West Indies cricketer
- Matthew Fox (born 1966), American actor and model
- Matthew Francis (born 1956), British poet and editor
- Matthew Freud (born 1963), British businessman
- Matthew Friedberger (born 1972), American singer, songwriter and multi-instrumentalist

=== G ===
- Matthew Gagnon (born 1980), American executive, political strategist and writer
- Matthew Garber (1956–1977), British child actor
- Matthew Gidley (born 1977), Australian professional rugby league footballer
- Matthew Giobbi (born 1974), American author and educator
- Matthew Good (born 1971), Canadian rock musician
- Matthew Goode (born 1978), English actor
- Matthew Gotel (born 1999), American football player
- Matthew Gray Gubler (born 1980), American actor
- Matthew Greywolf (born 1977), German musician
- Matthew Griffin (game designer), American game designer and marketer
- Matthew Griswold (governor) (1715–1799), Governor of Connecticut
- Matthew Groening (born 1954), American cartoonist

=== H ===
- Matthew Hale (disambiguation), multiple people
- Matthew Hammett, member of the Alabama house of representatives
- Matthew Harris (disambiguation), multiple people
- Matthew Hayball (born 1997), Australian-American football player
- Matthew Hayden (born 1971), Australian cricketer
- Mattew Kiichi Heafy (born 1986), American musician
- Matty Healy (born 1989), British rock musician
- Matthew Henry (1662–1714), Welsh Nonconformist minister and author
- Matthew Henson (1866–1955), African-American Arctic explorer
- Matthew Herbert (born 1972), British electronic musician
- Matthew Hibner (born 2002), American football player
- Matthew Hoggard (born 1976), English cricketer
- Matthew Hollett, Canadian writer
- Matthew Hopkins (1620–1647), English Witch-hunting
- Matthew Hughes (badminton) (born 1978), Welsh badminton player
- Matt Hughes (writer) (born 1949), Canadian author

=== I ===
- Matthew Ianniello (1920–2012), of the Genovese crime family
- Matthew Illingsworth (born 1968), is a road and track racing cyclist
- Matthew Inabinet (born 1984), Australian sport shooter
- Matthew Inman (born 1982), cartoonist, creator of The Oatmeal webcomic and humor website
- Matthew Innes MA, FRHS, is Vice Master and Professor of History at Birkbeck College, University of London
- Matthew Irmas, American director and producer
- Matthew Irwin (born 1987), Canadian professional ice hockey player
- Matthew Iserhoff of CerAmony, a Canadian duo musical band of Cree origin from Whapmagoostui
- Matthew II Izmirlian (1845–1910), Catholicos of All Armenians of the Armenian Apostolic Church

=== J ===
- Matthew Jarvis (born 1985), Canadian professional poker player
- Matthew Jay (1978–2003), English singer-songwriter
- Matthew Jebb (born 1958), Irish botanist and taxonomist
- Matthew Jensen, several people
- Matthew Johns (born 1971), Australian rugby league football commentator and player
- Matthew Judon (born 1992), American football player
- Matthew Jurman, Australian soccer player

=== K ===
- Matthew Kacsmaryk (born 1977), American judge
- Matthew Kaminski (journalist) (born 1971), American editor and journalist
- Matthew Kelly (disambiguation), multiple people
- Matthew Kenney, American celebrity chef, entrepreneur, author, and educator
- Matthew Kenseth- 2003 NASCAR Cup Series champion
- Matthew Kennedy (disambiguation), multiple people
- Matthew Kigallon (born 1984), English professional footballer
- Matthew Ko (born 1984), Hong Kong actor
- Matthew J. Kok, American actor and writer-director
- Matthew Koma (born 1987), American singer
- Matthew of Kraków (c. 1335–1410), German-Polish scholar and priest
- Matthew Kreuzer (born 1989), Australian rules footballer
- Matthew Kroenig (born 1977), American political scientist and national security strategist

=== L ===
- Matthew Labyorteaux (born 1966), American film, television and voice actor
- Matthew Laflin (1803–1897), American manufacturer, businessman, philanthropist, and pioneer
- Matthew Ladensack (born 1987), American director, producer, screenwriter and entrepreneur
- Matthew Lauter (born 2002), American football player
- Matthew Lawrence (born 1980), American actor
- Matthew Leckie (born 1991), Australian soccer player
- Matthew Lesko (born 1943), American author and television personality
- Matthew Lessner, American artist and independent filmmaker
- Matthew Levatich (born 1964/65), American businessman, CEO of Harley-Davidson
- Matthew Lewis (disambiguation), multiple people
- Matthew Liberatore (born 1999), American baseball player
- Matthew Lillard (born 1970), American actor
- Matthew Lloyd (disambiguation), multiple people
- Matthew Lodge (born 1995), Australian rugby league footballer
- Matthew Logelin, American author, blogger, public speaker, and charity founder
- Matthew López, American playwright, director and screenwriter
- Matthew Lopez, multiple people
- Matthew B. Lowrie, American politician
- Matthew Lyon, American politician

=== M ===
- Matthew Macfadyen (born 1974), British theatre and film actor
- Matthew Marsden (born 1973), English actor
- Matthew Fontaine Maury, Commodore of the United States navy
- Matthew McCloskey, American politician
- Matthew McConaughey (born 1969), American actor
- Matthew McEwen (born 1971), Australian decathlete
- Matthew Mervis (born 1998), American baseball player
- Matthew Mileham (born 1976), British hammer thrower
- Matthew Miller (disambiguation), multiple people
- Matthew Modine (born 1959), American actor
- Matt Moore (disambiguation), multiple people
- Matthew Morrison (born 1978), American actor, dancer, and singer-songwriter
- Matthew Saad Muhammad (1954–2014), professional boxer
- Matthew Murphy (born 1984), English musician; lead vocalist & guitarist of The Wombats
- Matt Murray (born 1994), Canadian ice hockey goaltender
- Matthew Murray (1765–1826), English steam engine and machine tool manufacturer
- Matthew Myers (judge), Australian judge

=== N ===
- Matthew Nathan (1862–1939), British soldier and colonial administrator
- Matthew L. Nathan, 37th Surgeon General of the United States Navy
- Matthew Naythons (born 1946), American photojournalist, physician and publisher
- Matthew Needham (born 1984), British actor
- Matthew M. Neely American politician
- Matthew Neuhaus (born 1958), American diplomat
- Matthew Newkirk (1794–1868), American railroad executive
- Matthew Nielsen (born 1978), Australian professional basketball coach and player
- Matthew Noble (1817–1876), British portrait sculptor
- Matthew Norman (born 1986), Australian drug trafficker
- Matthew Noszka (born 1992), American model and actor

=== O ===
- Matthew Oakley (born 1977), English retired professional footballer
- Matthew O'Brien, American author, journalist and teacher
- Matthew O'Callaghan, American film director, animator, writer, and storyboard artist
- Matthew O'Connor (soccer) (born 1984), Canadian former soccer player
- Matthew O'Connor (swimmer) (born 1971), British former competitive swimmer
- Matthew O'Conor (1773–1844), Irish historian, the O'Conor Don and de jure King of Connacht
- Matthew Odell, American pianist
- Matthew Odmark (born 1974), American musician, a guitarist for Christian alternative folk rock group Jars of Clay
- Matthew O'Donnell MA, BD, DPh was an Irish priest, president of St. Patrick's College, Maynooth
- Matthew O'Dwyer (born 1988), Australian rules footballer
- Matthew Offord, FRGS (born 1969), British Conservative Party politician and a Member of Parliament
- Matthew Ogens, American film director, creative director, photographer and artist
- Matthew O'Hanlon (born 1991), Irish sportsperson
- Matthew Okohh (born 1972), former U.S.–Nigerian soccer player
- Matthew O'Leary (born 1987), American actor
- Matthew Olim, CEO and co-founder of CDNow, Inc.
- Matthew G. Olsen (born 1962), American prosecutor and the former Director of the National Counterterrorism Center (NCTC)
- Matthew Olson, retired American soccer goalkeeper
- Matthew Vincent O'Malley (1878–1931), U.S. Representative from New York in 1931
- Matthew O'Neill (footballer) (born 1984), English professional footballer
- Matthew Oram MBE (1885–1969), New Zealand politician of the National Party
- Matthew O'Reilly (1880–1962), Irish politician
- Matthew O'Rourke (born 1967), New Zealand former cricketer
- Matthew Orr (businessman) (born 1962), entrepreneur living in the UK
- Matthew D. Orwig (born 1959), American attorney
- Matthew O'Shea, the Alderman of the 19th ward of Chicago
- Matthew Osman (born 1983), Australian former professional footballer
- Matthew Otten (born 1981), American former professional basketball player

=== P ===
- Matthew Parker (1504–1575), English Archbishop of Canterbury
- Matthew Paris (c. 1200–1259), Benedictine monk, English chronicler, artist in illuminated manuscripts and cartographer
- Matthew Parris (born 1949), British journalist and politician
- Matthew Patrick (born 1986), American YouTuber
- Matthew Perry (disambiguation), multiple people
  - Matthew Perry (1969–2023), American and Canadian actor
- Matthew Prior (disambiguation), multiple people
- Matthew Pinsent (born 1970), English rower and broadcaster
- Matthew Potter, Irish academic
- Matt Preston (born 1961), English-born Australian food critic, cravat enthusiast and television personality

=== Q ===
- Matthew Quay (1833–1904), American political boss
- Matthew Quick (born 1973), American writer of adult and young adult fiction
- Matthew Quick (artist) (born 1967), Australian artist
- Matthew Quinn (bishop) DD (1821–1885), an Australian Roman Catholic suffragan bishop
- Matthew Quinn (cricketer) (born 1993), New Zealand first-class cricketer
- Matthew Quintal (1766–1799), Cornish able seaman and mutineer aboard HMS Bounty

=== R ===
- Matthew Ramsey (born 1977), American country music singer and songwriter
- Matthew Rabinowitz (born 1973), South African-American entrepreneur and investor
- Matthew Reilly (born 1974), Australian action thriller writer
- Matthew Richardson (disambiguation), multiple people
- Matthew Ridgway (1895–1993), senior United States Army officer
- Matthew Rinker (born 1984), American politician
- Matthew Robinson (disambiguation), multiple people
- Matthew Ryan (disambiguation), multiple people

=== S ===
- Matthew Charles Sanders (born 1981), known by his stage name M. Shadows, American musician
- Matthew Salapu-Faiumu, New Zealand music composer
- Matthew Saville, Australian television and film director
- Matthew J. Saville, New Zealand actor and filmmaker, director of Juniper
- Matt Schwartz (born 1971), British DJ
- Matthew Sergent, American politician
- Seok Matthew (born 2002) Canadian singer and member of the South-Korean boy group Zerobaseone
- Matthew Shepard (1976–1998), American murder victim
- Matthew Silverman (born 1976), American General Manager and President for Baseball Operations for the Tampa Bay Rays
- Matthew Simpson (1811–1884), American bishop of the Methodist Episcopal Church
- Matthew Slater (born 1985), American football gunner New England Patriots
- Matthew Slattery (footballer) (born 2005), Hong Kong professional footballer
- Matthew Smith (disambiguation), multiple people
- Matthew Stafford (born 1988), American football Quarterback for the Los Angeles Rams
- Matthew Stevens (born 1977), Welsh professional snooker player
- Matthew Stone (born 1971), American animator and producer
- Matthew Sturgis, British historian and biographer
- Matthew Sutcliffe (1550?-1629), English
- Matthew Sweet (born 1964), American rock singer-songwriter and musician
- Matthew Schaefer (born 2007) Canadian professional ice hockey player

=== T ===
- Matthew Tavares (born 1990), Canadian musician, songwriter, and music producer
- Matthew Taylor (disambiguation), multiple people
- Matthew Teitelbaum (born 1956), Canadian art historian
- Matthew Thiessen (born 1980), Canadian-American musician, singer and songwriter
- Matthew Thomas (linebacker) (born 1995), American football player
- Matthew Thorton (1714–1803), Irish-born Founding Father of the United States
- Matthew Tkachuk (born 1997), American ice hockey player
- Matthew Tobriner (1904–1982), American judge, lawyer, and law professor
- Matthew Trollinger, United States Marine Corps major general
- Matthew Trundle (1965–2019), British-born New Zealand academic
- Matthew Tuck (born 1980), Welsh musician
- Matthew Turner (disambiguation), multiple people

=== U ===
- Matthew Updike, American Paralympic cyclist
- Matthew Upson (born 1979), English former professional footballer
- Matthew Utai (born 1981), professional rugby league footballer
- Matthew Uttley FRHistS FRSA (born 1965), British academic and writer
- Matthew Uy (born 1990), American born Filipino footballer

=== V ===
- Matthew Vandrau (born 1969), retired English-born South African-raised cricketer
- Matthew VanDyke (born 1979), American documentary filmmaker, revolutionary, and former journalist
- Matthew Vaniel (1919–1981), American professional basketball player
- Matthew Edward Vasgersian (born 1967), American sportscaster and television host
- Matthew Vassar (1792–1868), English-born American brewer, merchant and philanthropist
- Matthew Vaughn (born 1971), English film producer, director, and screenwriter
- Matthew Vellanickal (born 1934), New Testament scholar, vicar general of the Syro-Malabar Catholic Archdiocese of Changanassery
- Matthew of Vendôme, French author of the 12th century, writing in Latin, who had been was a pupil of Bernard Silvestris at Tours
- Matt Vesely, Australian filmmaker
- Matthew Villis (born 1984), English footballer
- Matthew Vines (born 1990), LGBT activist, known for the viral YouTube video The Gay Debate: The Bible and Homosexuality

=== W ===
- Matthew Walker (disambiguation), multiple people
- Matthew Waterhouse (born 1961), English actor and writer
- Matthew Webb, first man to swim the English channel unaided
- Matthew Wells (linebacker) (born 1990), American football player
- Matthew West (born 1977), American contemporary Christian musician, singer-songwriter, and actor
- Matthew Wood (disambiguation), multiple people
- Matthew Williams (disambiguation), multiple people
- Matthew Wright (disambiguation), multiple people

=== X ===
- Matthew Xia, disc jockey

=== Y ===
- Matthew Yap (born 1999), Singaporean Powerlifter and Coach
- Matthew Yglesias (born 1981), American blogger and journalist
- Matthew Young (disambiguation), multiple people

=== Z ===
- Matthew Zell (1477–1548), Lutheran pastor and reformer based in Strasbourg
- Matthew Zeremes, Australian actor known for his television, theatre and film roles
- Matthew Ziff (born 1991), American actor and producer
- Matthew A. Zimmerman, USA (born 1941), retired American Army officer
- Matthew Zions (born 1978), Australian professional golfer
- Matthew Zone, Cleveland, Ohio city councilman
- Matthew Zook, American geographer and professor in the University of Kentucky
- Matthew Zunic (1919–2006), American basketball player and coach

=== Fictional characters ===
- Matthew, a character in the animated series Adventure Time episode "The Mountain"
- Matthew Applewhite, character from American comedy-drama series, Desperate Housewives
- Matthew Brock, a protagonist of American TV series NewsRadio
- Matthew "Matt" Bevilaqua, a character on The Sopranos
- Matthew Cable, a character appearing in DC Comics' Swamp Thing series
- Matthew "Matt" Casey, a main protagonist in American TV series Chicago Fire
- Matthew "Matt" Cordell, main antagonist and centerpiece of the Maniac Cop trilogy
- Matthew Fairchild, one of the protagonists of Cassandra Clare's Last Hours trilogy
- Matthew "Matt" Hagen, the second incarnation of DC Comics supervillain Clayface
- Matthew Kane, a protagonist of Quake IV video game
- Matthew "Matt" McNamara, on the American TV series Nip/Tuck
- Matthew "Matt" Murdock, a.k.a. Daredevil of Earth-616 from the Marvel Comics
  - Matthew "Matt" Murdock, a.k.a. Kingpin of Earth-65 from the Marvel Comics
- Matthew "Matt" Parkman, in American TV series Heroes
- Matthew Patel, a Character from the franchise series Scott Pilgrim
- Matthew "Matt" Robinson, on Australian soap opera Neighbours
- Matthew "Matt" Santos, successor to Josiah Bartlet in The West Wing
- Matthew "Matt" Saracen, in American TV series Friday Night Lights
- Matthew "Matt" Simmons, a protagonist of American TV series Criminal Minds
- Matthew "Matt" Taylor, one of the protagonists of the Until Dawn video game
- Matthew Williams, the personification of Canada in the anime Hetalia
