= Alvis Whitted =

American football player and coach (born 1974)

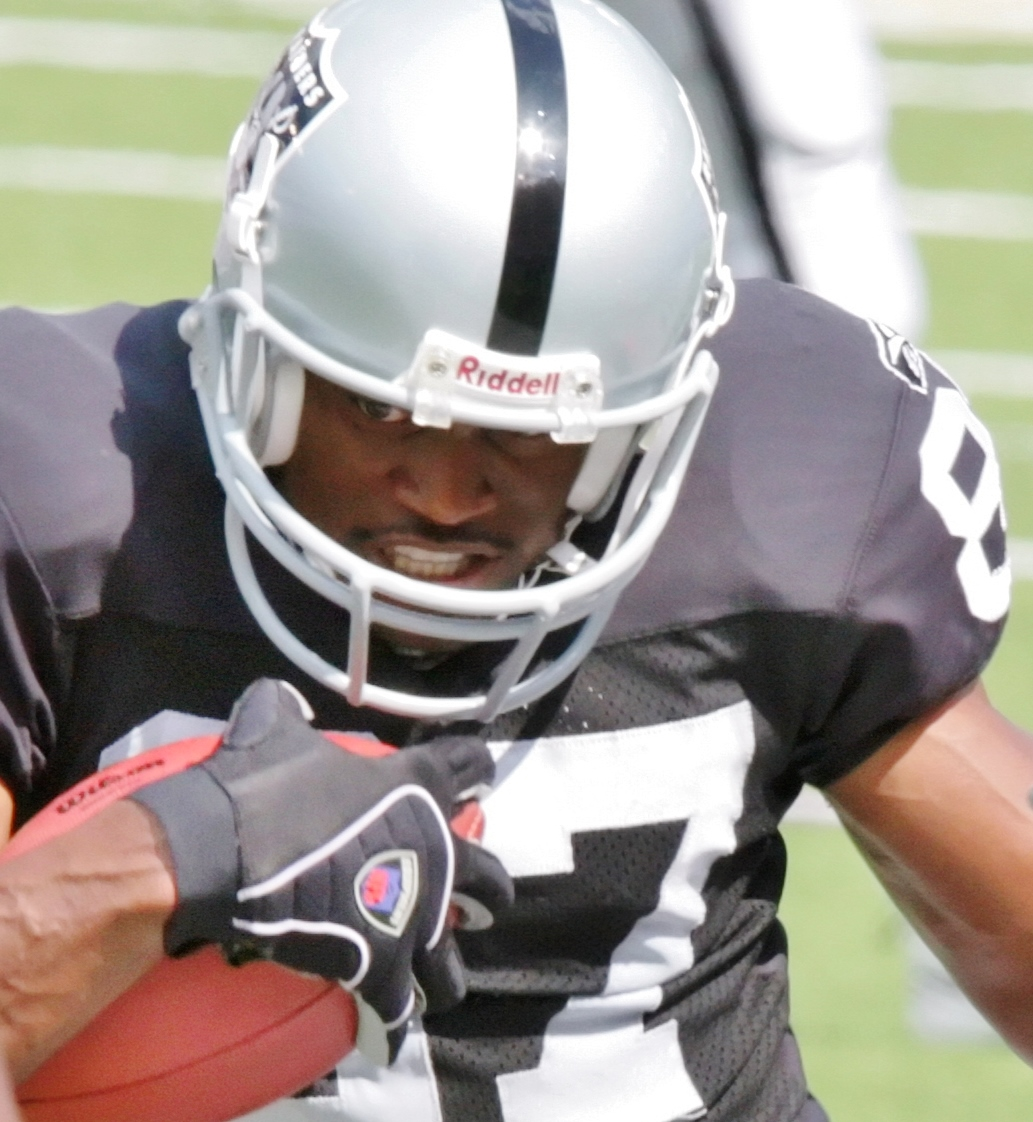
- Whitted with the Oakland Raiders in 2006

Profile
- Position: Wide receivers coach

Personal information
- Born: September 4, 1974 (age 52); Durham, North Carolina, U.S.
- Listed height: 6 ft 0 in (1.83 m)
- Listed weight: 185 lb (84 kg)

Career information
- High school: Orange (Hillsborough, North Carolina)
- College: NC State (1993–1997)
- NFL draft: 1998: 7th round, 192nd overall pick

Career history

Playing
- Jacksonville Jaguars (1998–2001); Atlanta Falcons (2002)*; Oakland Raiders (2002–2006)
- * Offseason or practice squad member only

Coaching
- Millsaps College (2010) Wide receivers coach; UCLA (2011) Offensive quality control coach; Colorado State (2012–2018) Wide receivers coach; Green Bay Packers (2019) Wide receivers coach; Wisconsin (2020–2022) Wide receivers coach; Utah (2023–2024) Wide receivers coach; NC State (2025) Senior offensive analyst; Boise State (2026–present) Pass game coordinator/Wide receivers coach

Career NFL statistics
- Receptions: 74
- Receiving yards: 1,030
- Receiving touchdowns: 6
- Rushing yards: 118
- Rushing average: 8.4
- Return yards: 388
- Return touchdowns: 1
- Stats at Pro Football Reference

Alvis James Whitted (born September 4, 1974) is an American former professional football player who was a wide receiver in the National Football League (NFL). He played college football for the NC State Wolfpack.

== Early life ==
Whitted played two years as a wide receiver at Orange High School in Hillsborough, North Carolina, and was also a standout in track and field. He was a state champion in the 100 and 200 meters as a senior in 1993 and won MVP honors of the NCHSAA 4A state championships as well.

== College career ==
Whitted played his college football at North Carolina State University. He played as a wide receiver.

== Track and field ==
Whitted was the North Carolina state champion in the 100 and 200 meters his senior year of high school in 1993. He would continue running track along with playing football at NC State.

He recorded personal bests of 10.02 seconds in the 100 meters and 20.03 seconds in the 200 meters.

He would later participate in the 1996 U.S. Olympic Trials, where he finished in sixth place in the 200 meters, with a time of 20.29 seconds, running against Michael Johnson and Carl Lewis.

=== Personal bests ===
Event	Time (seconds)	Venue	Date
100 meters	10.02	Chapel Hill, North Carolina	April 20, 1996
200 meters	20.03	Chapel Hill, North Carolina	April 20, 1996
400 meters	45.88	Raleigh, North Carolina	March 24, 1995

== Professional career ==
Whitted was selected in the seventh round of the 1998 NFL draft by the Jacksonville Jaguars, where he played until he was picked up by the Atlanta Falcons in 2002.

He was released by the Falcons but signed with the Raiders shortly after and played special teams during the 2002 NFL season and the team's Super Bowl XXXVII loss. He played as a wide receiver and on special teams from 2003 onwards.

In the 2006 season, Whitted won a starting job at receiver for the Raiders. He totaled 27 receptions for 299 yards on the year with no touchdowns. Whitted was released by the Raiders on September 1, 2007.

== Coaching career ==
=== UCLA Bruins ===
Whitted spent the 2011 season on Rick Neuheisel's staff at UCLA, as offensive quality-control assistant. At UCLA, Whitted worked with wide receivers and special teams, and helped prepare the offense for games by heading the defensive scout team.

=== Colorado State Rams ===
On February 6, 2012, Whitted was named wide receivers coach at Colorado State University. While at Colorado State, he helped mold Rashard Higgins and Michael Gallup into Biletnikoff Award finalist receivers.

=== Green Bay Packers ===
On January 30, 2019, Whitted became the next wide receivers coach for the Green Bay Packers of the National Football League (NFL).

=== Wisconsin Badgers ===
On March 4, 2020, Whitted was announced as the wide receivers coach for the Wisconsin Badgers.

=== Utah Utes ===
On January 24, 2023, he was announced as the new wide receivers coach for the Utah Utes.

=== Boise State Broncos ===
Whitted was hired by Boise State in January 2026 to replace Matt Miller as wide receivers coach and as pass game coordinator, a new position.
