= Powerlifting Singapore =

Governing body for powerlifting in Singapore

- Sport: Powerlifting
- Jurisdiction: National
- Founded: 2011
- Affiliation: International Powerlifting Federation
- President: Clinton Lee
- Vice president: Ng Jun Jie
- Secretary: Daphne Maia Loo

Official website
- www.powerliftingsingapore.com
- (Singapore)

Competition record

Powerlifting Singapore

2014 Asia/Oceania Championships
1st	Marcus Yap	Total/Overall

2015 World Championships
2nd	Marcus Yap	Total/Overall

2015 Asia/Oceania Championships
1st	Christophe Ang, Clinton Lee, Daniel Nobel	Total/Overall
3rd	Kim Derrick	Total/Overall

2016 Asia/Oceania Championships
1st	Marcus Yap, Matthew Yap, Koo Wei Feng	Total/Overall

2017 World Championships
2nd	Matthew Yap	Total/Overall

2017 Asian Championships
1st	Marcus Yap, Matthew Yap, Abigail Looi, Jonathan Chua	Total/Overall
2nd	Matthias Yap	Total/Overall

2018 World Championships
3rd	Abigail Looi	Total/Overall

2018 Asian Championships
1st	Matthew Yap, Matthias Yap, Danial Norfatris, Farhanna Farid	Total/Overall
2nd	Tang Venus	Total/Overall
3rd	Yeong Qing Quan	Total/Overall

2019 Asian Championships
1st	Matthew Yap, Farhanna Farid, Shirley Chu, Danial Norfatris	Total/Overall
2nd	Cindy Witono	Total/Overall

Powerlifting Singapore is the governing body for the sport of Powerlifting in Singapore. Powerlifting Singapore provides fair, drug-tested competitions nationwide, from local to National and International events. Powerlifting Singapore is recognized under the Asian Powerlifting Federation (APF) and the International Powerlifting Federation (IPF). As of 28 June 2014, Powerlifting (Singapore) has also officially endorsed and adopted Anti-Doping Singapore (ADS) drug control policy and regulation which is under compliance of World Anti-Doping Agency (WADA).

== History ==
In 2009, Tan Say Yong, a Singaporean working in the US, came in 1st in his category during the California State Games powerlifting meet. When he returned, his passion and keen interest in this sport were further fuelled after meeting after Tom Liaw, president of the Singapore Weightlifting Federation (SWF), who is also a keen supporter of powerlifting. With the collaboration with SWF, Say Yong and a small group of volunteers formed the Powerlifting Singapore group and organized the 1st local powerlifting meet in 2011, The Singapore National Open 2011. Although done on a very small scale with only 13 participants, this inaugural meet sparked interests from keen sportsmen from the local strength community- hence the birth of the powerlifting scene.

Powerlifting Singapore continued to hold SPO12 (Singapore Powerlifting Open) and SPO13, where national records were being broken year by year. Today SPO has become an annual national sporting event in Singapore which attracts participants and spectators from all parts of Singapore. In addition there has been held Singapore Powerlifting Invitationals (SPI) with competitors coming to Singapore from neighbouring countries such as Malaysia, India, Australia, Hong Kong, Taiwan, Philippines and even the US and UK.

Powerlifting Singapore's first participation in an international event started in 2014, for the Asia & Oceania Championships held in Melbourne, Australia. To date, the organisation regularly participates in international competitions such as the Asian championships and the World championships.

In 2022, Sport Singapore, the governing statutory board in Singapore over sports, clarified that it recognised Powerlifting Singapore as a National Sports Association but does not receive funding from it due to regulatory requirements.

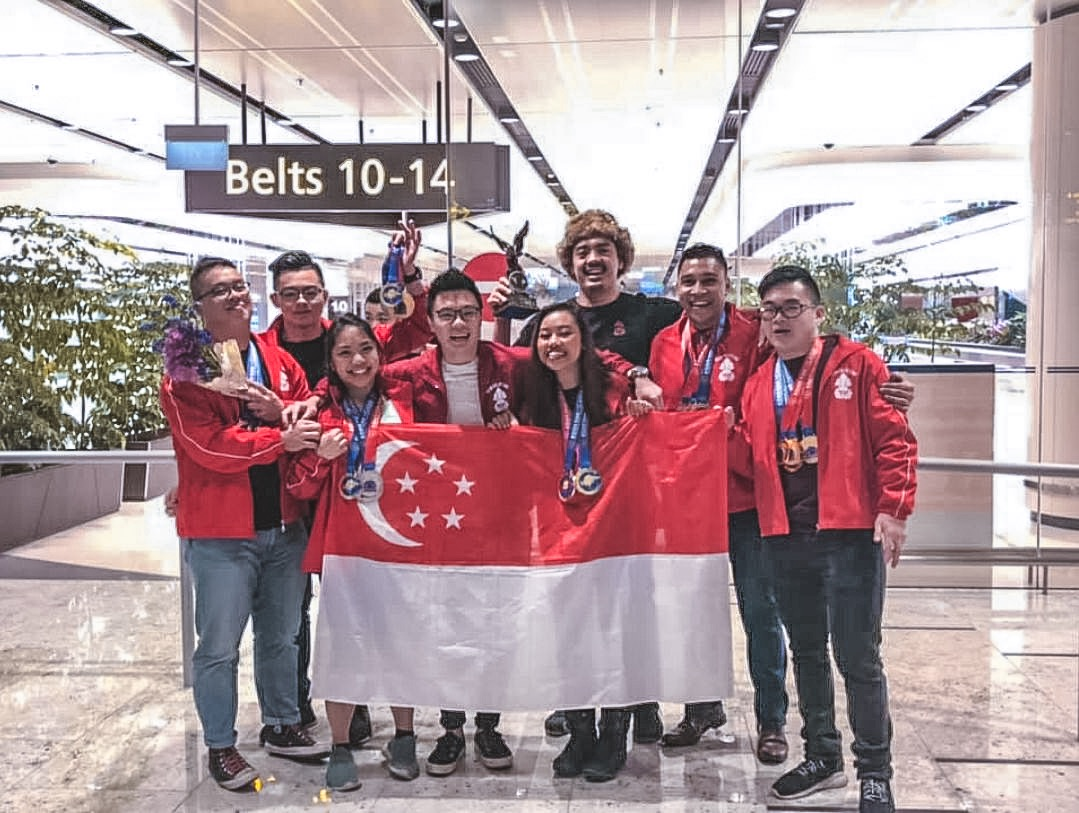
A team from Powerlifting Singapore after the 2018 Asian Championships held in Ulaanbaatar, Mongolia.

== World records by Singapore ==
The first Singapore powerlifter to break a world record was Marcus Yap during the 2015 World Championships in Salo Finland which is Powerlifting Singapore's first participation in the World Championships. Yap broke the deadlift World record with a 223 kg (491 lb) deadlift in the U59kg Junior Class.

The next World record is broken and held by Daniel Nobel. Nobel originally from Denmark. Nobel broke the World record with a 303.5 kg (669 lb) deadlift. He beat his own World record minutes later with a 305 kg (672 lb) deadlift in the U120kg Sub-Junior Class.

In June 2017, Matthew Yap broke the world squat record at his first-ever world tournament at the World Classic Powerlifting Championships in Minsk, Belarus.

In December 2017, Matthew Yap broke his own world squat record twice, once on his second attempt of 208.5kg and another on his third attempt setting it at 215.5kg. He also broke the total/overall world record and he ranked #1 in the under 66kg, Sub-Junior Class.

== ASEAN Paralympic Games ==
Singapore had 2 athletes represent the country in the sport of Paralympic Powerlifting for the 8th ASEAN Paralympic Games. Kalai Vanen and Melvyn Yeo both participated in the ASEAN Para Games which took place at Marina Bay Sands in December. Vanen won a bronze medal with a benchpress of 140 kg (308 lb) in the U97kg weight class. Yeo lifted 110 kg (242 lb) in the benchpress in the 65 kg weight class. The president of Powerlifting Singapore, Say Tan along with the Vice-President, Zulhairy Bin Zolkaffeli were both a part of the organization of the event.
