= Farhanna Farid =

Singaporean powerlifter

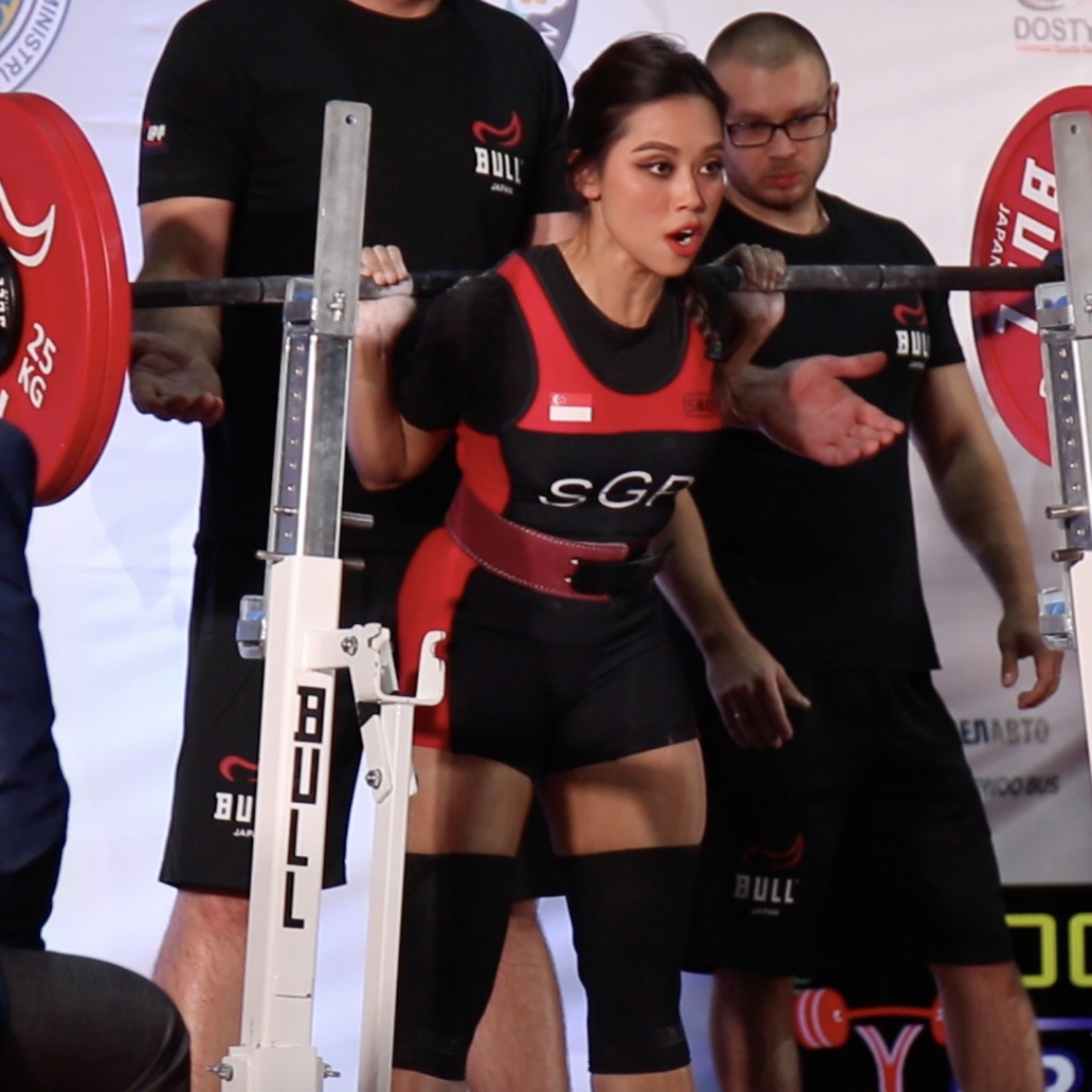
- Farhanna at the 2019 Asian Championships

Personal information
- Nationality: Singaporean
- Born: 26 September 1992 (age 34) Singapore
- Occupation: Pharmacist
- Height: 158 cm (5 ft 2 in)

Sport
- Country: Singapore
- Sport: Powerlifting
- Weight class: 52kg
Medal record
Representing Singapore
Asian Championships
Gold medal – first place	2018 Ulaanbataar	Squat
Gold medal – first place	2018 Ulaanbataar	Deadlift
Gold medal – first place	2018 Ulaanbataar	Total/Overall
Gold medal – first place	2019 Almaty	Deadlift
Gold medal – first place	2019 Almaty	Total/Overall
Silver medal – second place	2019 Almaty	Squat
Bronze medal – third place	2018 Ulaanbataar	Bench Press
Bronze medal – third place	2019 Almaty	Bench Press

Farhanna Farid is a Singaporean powerlifter. She is a 2-time Asian champion and a 4-time national champion. As of 2022, she has broken 6 Asian records and a world record and is also the first Singaporean to win an overall gold medal in an international competition for the female's open category. She made her international competition debut in the 2018 Asian Classic Powerlifting Championships winning three golds.

== Biography ==
Farhanna was born in Singapore in 1992. She graduated from the National University of Singapore (NUS), and works professionally as a pharmacist. She started her powerlifting career in 2017, entering her first international competition in 2018.

== Career ==
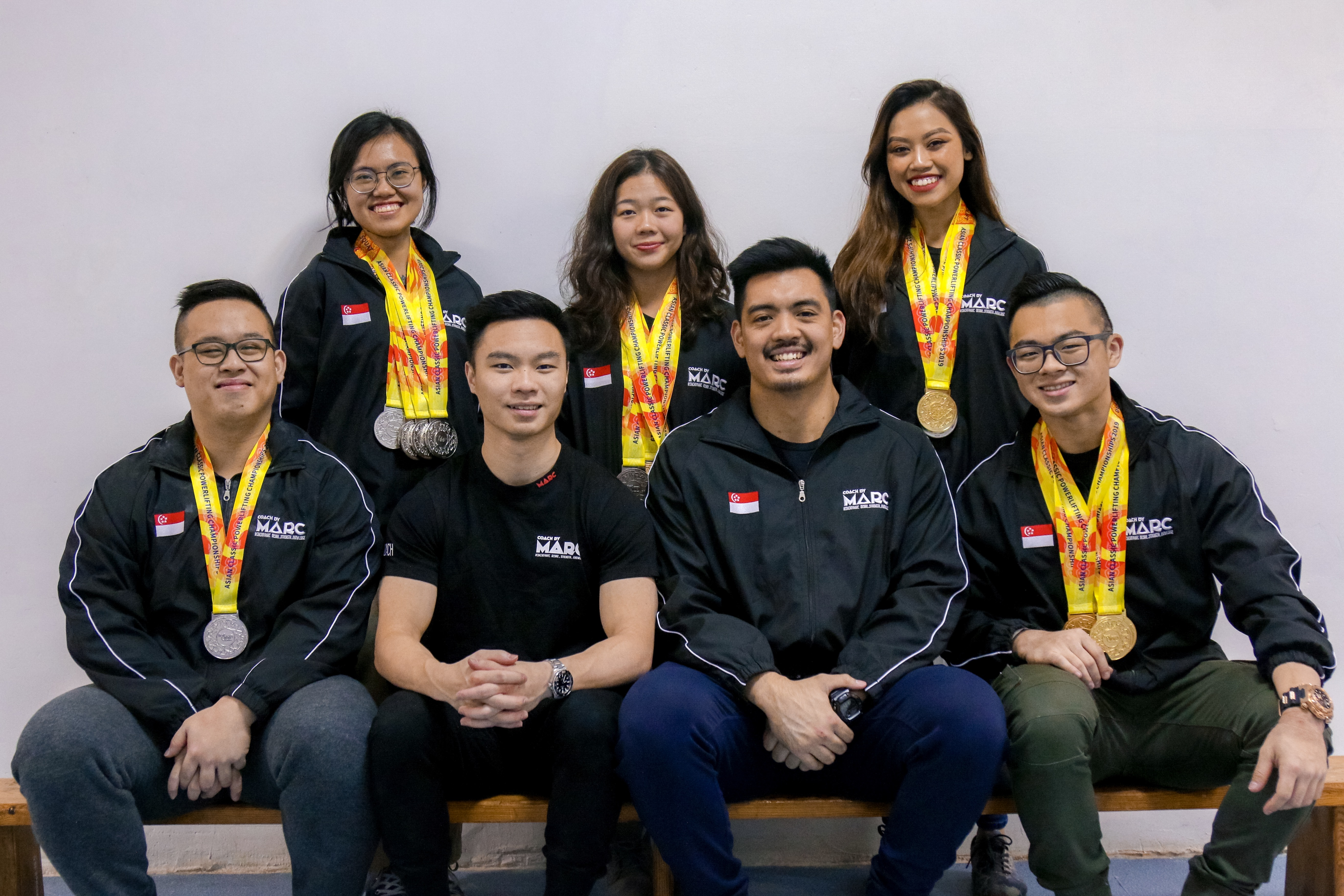
Team CoachbyMARC at the 2019 Asian Championships in Almaty, Kazakhstan Picture: (left) Cindy Witono, Shirley Chu, Farhanna Farid (left) Yeong Qing Quan, Marcus Yap, James Barcelo, Matthew Yap

Farhanna started competing in 2018 in Powerlifting Singapore's national competition, the Singapore Powerlifting Open and won her category, breaking 4 national records. She went on to compete in three more national competitions and is now the 4-time national champion.

Making her international career debut, Farhanna competed in the under 52kg open Category at the 2018 Asian Classic Powerlifting Championships in Ulaanbaatar, Mongolia. She broke the Asian record in her first deadlift attempt, and exceeded her first lift in both her second and third attempt. Her 173 kg deadlift exceeded the previous Asian record by 13 kg.

She was awarded the Best Lifter (silver) by IPF Points and also won the Squat (120 kg) and Overall categories in her weight class, in addition to a bronze in the Bench Press. Farhanna competed in the 2019 Asian Classic Championships held in Almaty, Kazakhstan. In this competition, she retained her Asian champion title to become the 2-time Asian champion.

She ended off the competition with a silver medal in the Squat (127.5 kg), and a bronze medal in the Bench Press (57.5 kg) as well as breaking the Asian record in her second deadlift attempt and won two gold medals in the Deadlift (178 kg) and Overall category (363 kg). Both her Deadlift and Total were new Asian records.

=== World record ===
On 6 June 2022, Farhanna set a world record in the open U-52kg deadlift at the World Open Classic Powerlifting Championships 2022 in Sun City, South Africa. She achieved 200.5kg, ahead of France's Noemie Allabert and Shizuka Rico who achieved 192.5kg and 185kg respectively.

On 16 September 2022, Farhanna broke her own world record, lifting 201kg at the inaugural Southeast Asian Cup in Johor Bahru, Malaysia.

On 15 December 2023, Farhanna rewrote her deadlift world record twice at the Asian Classic Powerlifting Championships in Johor Bahru, Malaysia. After clearing her first attempt of 190kg, Farhanna lifted 203.5kg on her second try and followed that up with a new world record 208kg effort. This was the eighth time she has rewritten the record in the past 1½ years. She broke her own record again on 16 June 2024 in Lithuania.

At the 2026 IPF World Classic Open Powerlifting Championships in Druskininkai, Lithuania, Farhanna Farid set her 14th world record with a 220.5 kg deadlift in the women’s 52 kg class on 14 June 2026. The lift earned her gold in the deadlift event and surpassed her previous world record of 217.5 kg, set in December 2025. She also recorded a 145 kg squat and 72.5 kg bench press, finishing fifth overall with a 438 kg total.

== See also ==
- List of Singapore world champions in sports
