= List of NFL career completion percentage leaders =

This is a list of National Football League career regular season passing completion percentage leaders (minimum 1,500 career regular season passing attempts) and postseason completion percentage leaders (minimum 150 career postseason passing attempts).

Joe Burrow is the all-time leader in passing completion percentage at 68.7%. Nick Foles leads in postseason completion percentage at 68.1%.

== Regular-season ==
Key
^ Inducted into the Pro Football Hall of Fame
* Active player

Quarterbacks must have at least 1,500 career attempts to qualify for this list.
Updated through Sunday, Week 7 of the 2026 season.

Rank	Player	Team(s) by season	Pct.	Completions	Attempts
1	Joe Burrow	Cincinnati Bengals (2020–2026)	68.69%	2,078	3,025
2	Brock Purdy	San Francisco 49ers (2022–2026)	68.09%	1,065	1,564
3	Tua Tagovailoa	Miami Dolphins (2020–2025); Atlanta Falcons (2026)	68.03%	1,649	2,424
4	Drew Brees ^	San Diego Chargers (2001–2005); New Orleans Saints (2006–2020)	67.69%	7,142	10,551
5	Jimmy Garoppolo	New England Patriots (2014–2016); San Francisco 49ers (2017–2022); Las Vegas Raiders (2023–2024; Los Angeles Rams (2025	67.36%	1,304	1,936
6	Kyler Murray	Arizona Cardinals (2019–2025); Minnesota Vikings (2026)	67.09%	2,057	3,066
7	Dak Prescott	Dallas Cowboys (2016–2026)	66.87%	3,347	5,005
8	Kirk Cousins<	Washington Redskins (2012–2017); Minnesota Vikings (2018–2023); Atlanta Falcons (2024–2025); Las Vegas Raiders (2026)	66.52%	4,095	6,156
9	Mac Jones	New England Patriots (2021–2023); Jacksonville Jaguars (2024); San Francisco 49ers (2025–2026)	66.49%	1,236	1,859
10	Teddy Bridgewater	Minnesota Vikings (2014–2015, 2017); New Orleans Saints (2018–2019); Carolina Panthers (2020); Denver Broncos (2021); Miami Dolphins (2022); Detroit Lions (2023–2024); Tampa Bay Buccaneers (2025)	66.28%	1,380	2,082
11	Patrick Mahomes	Kansas City Chiefs (2017–2026	66.14%	3,217	4,864

== Postseason ==
Quarterbacks must have at least 150 career postseason attempts to qualify for this list. Updated through the 2025–26 NFL playoffs.

Key
^ Inducted into the Pro Football Hall of Fame
* Active player

Rank	Player	Team(s) by season	Pct.	Completions	Attempts
1	Nick Foles	Philadelphia Eagles (2012–2014); St. Louis Rams (2015); Kansas City Chiefs (2016); Philadelphia Eagles (2017–2018); Jacksonville Jaguars (2019); Chicago Bears (2020–2021); Indianapolis Colts (2022)	68.1%	143	210
2	Patrick Mahomes	Kansas City Chiefs (2017–2026)	67.68%	511	755
3	Matt Ryan	Atlanta Falcons (2008–2021); Indianapolis Colts (2022)	67.52%	237	351
4	Joe Burrow	Cincinnati Bengals (2020–2026)	67.33%	169	251
5	Drew Brees ^	San Diego Chargers (2001–2005); New Orleans Saints (2006–2020)	66.71%	481	721
6	Josh Allen	Buffalo Bills (2018–2026)	66.48%	355	534
7	Kirk Cousins	Washington Redskins (2012–2017); Minnesota Vikings (2018–2023); Atlanta Falcons (2024–2025); Las Vegas Raiders (2026)	66.452%	103	155
8	Kurt Warner ^	St. Louis Rams (1998–2003); New York Giants (2004); Arizona Cardinals (2005–2009)	66.45%	307	462
9	Ken Anderson	Cincinnati Bengals (1971–1986)	66.27%	110	166
10	Jalen Hurts	Philadelphia Eagles (2020–2026)	65.64%	191	291
