= Matthew Davis (disambiguation) =

Matthew Davis (born 1978) is an American actor.

Matthew Davis or Matt Davis may also refer to:

- Matthew Davis (politician) (fl. 1937–1938), Irish Fianna Fáil politician
- Matthew L. Davis, who in 1836 published the memoirs of Aaron Burr
- Matthew Davis, the programmer of video game FTL: Faster Than Light
- Matthew Davis (physicist), New Zealand/Australian physicist
- Matt Davis (comedian) (born 1979), American stand-up comedian
- Matt Davis (Coronation Street), fictional character in the British soap opera
- Matt Davis (ice hockey) (born 2001), Canadian ice hockey player
- "Matt Davis", a song by the US ska band The Toasters, from the album Skaboom
- Matt Davis (rugby league) (born 1996), British rugby league footballer

== See also ==
- Matthew Davies (disambiguation)
