= Cultural depictions of Dylan Thomas =

Dylan Marlais Thomas (1914–1953) was a Welsh poet and writer who — along with his work — has been remembered and referred to by a number of artists in various media.

== In art ==
Alfred Janes' 1934 portrait of Thomas

- Alfred Janes' 1934 portrait of Thomas is held by the National Museum of Wales. Janes, like Thomas was a member of The Kardomah Gang or The Kardomah Boys, a group of bohemian Swansea friends who met at the Kardomah Café, in Castle Street, Swansea. Janes created three portraits of Thomas, the first of which, painted in Coleherne Road in 1934, is oil on canvas and displays Janes's technique at this period of cutting lines into the paint with his pen-knife, to provide relief and focus.
- Between 1937 and 1938, Augustus John produced two portraits of Thomas. One of these is held by the National Museum of Wales in Cardiff, acquired in 1942.
- Two portraits of Thomas by the artist Rupert Shephard, who would in later life marry Nicolette Macnamara, an elder sister of Caitlin Thomas, are in the National Portrait Gallery collection.

=== Art inspired by Thomas ===
- In the 1940s the Welsh artist and contemporary of Thomas, Ceri Richards, created several works directly inspired by him, notably three paintings collectively entitled, from the poem of the same name, ‘The force that through the green fuse,’ which he later reworked into lithographs. After Thomas’s death in 1953, Richards produced a series of works under the rubric Homage to Dylan Thomas. He continued to work on Thomas inspired art work and in 1965 created Twelve Lithographs for Dylan Thomas.

== In literature ==
- The poem "Thou Shalt Not Kill" by American poet Kenneth Rexroth bears the subtitle "A Memorial for Dylan Thomas".
- In issue #26 of the Vertigo Comics series Preacher, Thomas is depicted as a previous acquaintance of the character Cassidy. Cassidy is with Thomas when he collapses outside the White Horse Tavern, Thomas's last words being "The trouble with you fuckin' Irish is, you don't know how to drink..."
- In his 1963 book Hopscotch, Julio Cortázar makes several references to Thomas.
- In Charles Bukowski's short story This is what killed Dylan Thomas from 1973 book South of no North, the protagonist makes several references to Dylan Thomas.
- The 1986 Kingsley Amis novel The Old Devils features frequent references to "Brydan", a thinly disguised characterization of Thomas.
- In her 2010 book Matched, Ally Condie references Thomas' poem "Do not go gentle into that good night".
- In Chapter 13 of his 2012 novel All I Did Was Shoot My Man (A Leonid McGill mystery) crime novelist Walter Mosley recounts a street poet's talk in a New York bar:

"....among many of the recognised and lauded lights of the New York poetry scene the allure of Dylan Thomas has faded... They criticise everything from his depth of linguistic complexity to the obvious melodrama of his most well-known works. But what these poetry pontiffs fail to understand was that Thomas was a people's poet, a man that connected song and metre and the concerns of every human being living their lives and suffering the consequences. His work, in its every repetition, fights for the survival and lifeblood or a form that most so-called great poets have moved beyond the reach of the common man ..."

== In music ==
=== Settings of Thomas's work ===
- Igor Stravinsky wrote "In memoriam Dylan Thomas: Dirge canons and song" (1954) for tenor voice, string quartet, and four trombones, based on "Do not go gentle into that good night." (Stravinsky and Thomas were considering a joint new opera).
- Paul Dirmeikis set to music the poems "Song" and "Your Pain Shall Be A Music".
- American composer Robert Manno set the following poems to music:
  - "Fern Hill" (1973) for baritone and chamber ensemble, premiered in New York City 1974;
  - "And Death Shall Have No Dominion" for chorus and harp (2001), premiered at St. Martin's Church in Laugharne, commemorating the 50th Anniversary of Thomas' death in 2003;
  - "In my craft or sullen art" for baritone and orchestra (2007), serving as 'Dylan's Aria' in a recently completed (2013) full-length opera on Thomas' last days: Dylan & Caitlin (libretto by Welsh playwright Gwynne Edwards).
- Composer David Diamond set I Have Longed to Move Away for voice and piano in 1968.
- In 1981, American composer William Mayer, set the poem "Fern Hill" to music for a trio of soprano, flute and harp.
- John Cale set a number of Thomas's poems to music: There was a saviour, Do not go gentle into that good night, On a Wedding Anniversary and Lie still, sleep becalmed, recording them in his 1989 album Words for the Dying and (except for the first one) in his 1992 solo live album Fragments of a Rainy Season. Notable among these is "Do not go gentle into that good night", which he performed on stage in the concert held in Cardiff in 1999 to celebrate the opening of the Welsh Assembly. He also has a song titled "A Child's Christmas in Wales," the title being an homage to Dylan Thomas's work but with different lyrics and subject.
- In 1996, Belgian composer Henri Lazarof, released Encounters with Dylan Thomas, for soprano & chamber ensemble, comprising ten compositions based on the poet's work; including "Your Pain Shall be a Music", "In My Craft or Sullen Art" and "Shall gods be said to thump the clouds".
- American vocal group Cantus, performed two poems set to choral works, with music by Kenneth Jennings, on their 2001 album ...Against the Dying of the Light. The two poems are combined under the title "Two Laments on Dylan Thomas".
- 2002: A Child's Christmas in Wales for SATB choir and orchestra, written by Matthew Harris.
- 2003: The Dylan Thomas Jazz Suite 'Twelve Poems' set for Quintet and Voice, by Jen Wilson, commissioned by the Dylan Thomas Centre. Issued on CD in 2010.
- Donovan, in his 2004 album Beat Cafe, set to music the poem "Do not go gentle into that good night".
- Singer-songwriter Keith James has set a number of Thomas' works to music.
- 2014: Composer Andrew Lewis set Fern Hill to music for Orchestra and Electronics. This used an actual recording of Thomas' speech, in which Thomas takes the melodic line. The work was premiered at Bangor University on 3 October and was performed by the BBC National Orchestra of Wales, as part of the "My Friend Dylan Thomas" event.
- Rogers and Clarke set "The Hand that Signed the Paper" to music.

=== Musical compositions inspired by Thomas works ===
- The Jazz Suite Inspired by Dylan Thomas's "Under Milk Wood", a 1965 album by British pianist Stan Tracey, was inspired by Thomas's play.
- In December 2011 Stan Tracey, with his son drummer Clark Tracey and saxophonist Simon Allen, premiered his interpretation of "A Child's Christmas in Wales" at the King's Place arts venue in Camden.
- The indie-rock band Evans The Death, formed in London in 2011, take their name from the undertaker in Under Milk Wood.
- Robin Williamson wrote a tribute to Thomas called "For Mr. Thomas" on his album Songs of Love and Parting.
- Do Not Go Gentle, a full-length opera on the last days of Dylan Thomas with music by Robert Manno and libretto by Gwynne Edwards. It was premiered on 1 August 2015.

== In film and television ==
=== Depictions of Thomas ===
- 1962: Dylan Thomas, a short, Oscar-winning, documentary film with Richard Burton as narrator, directed by Jack Howells.
- 1964: Dylan, a Broadway play by Sidney Michaels, starring Alec Guinness as Dylan Thomas and Kate Reid as Caitlin.
- 1978: Dylan: Life and Death of a Poet, a BBC Wales film of Thomas' final two visits to America; starring Ronald Lacey and produced by Richard Lewis.
- 1990–91: Dylan Thomas: Return Journey, a one-man stage show that toured internationally, featuring Bob Kingdom as Thomas and directed by Anthony Hopkins. Hopkins later directed a film version of the stage play, to which he also wrote the musical score.
- 2008: The Edge of Love starring Matthew Rhys as the poet, directed by John Maybury, written by Sharman Macdonald, and drawing on David N. Thomas' book Dylan Thomas: A Farm, Two Mansions and a Bungalow.
- 2014: The TV drama A Poet in New York was created to mark the centenary of his birth, and starred Tom Hollander as Thomas.
- 2014: In the semi-autobiographical film Set Fire to the Stars Thomas is portrayed by Celyn Jones and John Brinnin by Elijah Wood.
- 2016: Dominion, a film written and directed by Steven Bernstein, examines Thomas' final hours. Thomas is portrayed by Rhys Ifans.

=== Other ===
- Under Milk Wood is a 1972 British drama film directed by Andrew Sinclair and based on the play for voices Under Milk Wood. It starred Richard Burton, Elizabeth Taylor and Peter O'Toole. Like the book it portrays the inhabitants of the fictional small Welsh village Llareggub.
- In the BBC Radio 4 show Desert Island Discs, 45 participants have selected a Dylan Thomas recording.
- Dylan Thomas: From Grave to Cradle, a 2021 BBC Arena documentary, by author and broadcaster Nigel Williams, with archive footage and the voices of those who knew him.

== Passing references in TV, film and popular music ==
- In the second season of The Librarians, in 2015, Jacob Stone mentions Thomas by name in the episode "And the Image of Image", and then in the third-season episode "And the Reunion of Evil" he quotes Thomas's poem "Do not go gentle into that good night".
- In the episode "Fore Father" of the cartoon Family Guy, an ill Stewie Griffin tells himself: "Fight it Stewie, fight it. 'Do not go gentle into that good night,' to quote Bob Dylan. Wait, no, wait, Dylan Thomas."
- In the 1980s comedy film Back to School, Rodney Dangerfield performs a silly, melodramatic reading of the poem "Do not go gentle into that good night."
- In the 2002 film Solaris, Chris Kelvin (George Clooney) reads the first stanza of "And death shall have no dominion".
- In the 1994 film Before Sunrise, Ethan Hawke's character mimics Dylan Thomas's voice, reading a fragment from the well-known poem "As I Walked Out One Evening" written by W. H. Auden.
- In the film Dangerous Minds, the teacher (Michelle Pfeiffer) asks her students to compare Bob Dylan with Dylan Thomas, and one quotes from the poem.
- The 2001 Ethan Hawke-directed film Chelsea Walls has a Dylan Thomas poem written on a hotel room wall.
- Bob Dylan's 1963 song "When the Ship Comes In" contains the phrase, "the chains of the sea", which matches the last line of Thomas's Fern Hill: "I sang in my chains like the sea". Dylan, born as Robert Zimmermann, is believed to have taken his last name from Thomas.
- Simon & Garfunkel's 1966 song, "A Simple Desultory Philippic (or How I Was Robert McNamara'd into Submission)", includes the lines, "He's so unhip, that when you say Dylan, he thinks you're talking about Dylan Thomas, Whoever he was."
- The song "Dog's Eyes, Owl Meat & Man Chop" from the album Domino Club (1990) by The Men They Couldn't Hang refers to Dylan Thomas and the area of Wales where he lived.
- Pittsburgh area band The Gathering Field referred to him in a song called "Dylan Thomas Days" on their 1994 self-titled album.
- The cover of the Beatles album Sgt. Pepper's Lonely Hearts Club Band (1967), designed by English pop artist Peter Blake, includes a photograph of Thomas.
- In Nick Cave and the Bad Seeds' 2002 song "There She Goes, My Beautiful World", Cave sings "Dylan Thomas/he died drunk/in St. Vincent's Hospital".
- In the children's animated television series Ivor the Engine the story lines drew heavily on, and were influenced by, the works of Thomas.
- The 2018 album by Manic Street Preachers titled Resistance is Futile features a track about the marriage of Dylan & Caitlin Thomas, written from a first person perspective, titled "Dylan & Caitlin".
- The 2019 eponymous album by Better Oblivion Community Center features a song named "Dylan Thomas" and incorrectly references his death as from a "seizure on a barroom floor."
- The title track of Taylor Swift's 2024 album "The Tortured Poets Department" references him: “I laughed in your face and said, ‘You’re not Dylan Thomas, I’m not Patti Smith, this ain’t the Chelsea Hotel, we’re modern idiots.’”
