= Matthew Cocks =

Matthew Cocks may refer to:

- Matthew Cocks, musician in Josef K (band)
- Matthew Cocks, footballer for Żurrieq F.C.

== See also ==
- Matthew Cox (disambiguation)
