= Matt Walker =

Matt Walker may refer to:

- Matt Walker (American football) (born 1977), American college football and college baseball coach
- Matt Walker (drummer) (born 1969), American drummer
- Matt Walker (ice hockey) (born 1980), Canadian hockey player
- Matt Walker (soccer) (born 1992), American soccer player
- Matt Walker (swimmer) (born 1978), British Paralympian
- Matt Walker (Australian musician), Australian blues musician
- Matt Walker (cyclist) (born 1999), British downhill mountain biker
- Matt Walker (politician), American politician

== See also ==
- Matthew Walker (English cricketer) (born 1974), usually known as Matt Walker
- Matthew Walker (disambiguation)
