= Matt Boyd =

Matt Boyd or Matthew Boyd may refer to:

- Matthew Boyd (Australian footballer) (born 1982), Australian rules footballer
- Matthew Boyd (baseball) (born 1991), American baseball player
- Matthew Boyd (politician), state legislator in Alabama
- Matt Boyd, a fictional character played by Richard Dreyfuss in Piranha 3D
