= Matthew Harris =

Matthew Harris may refer to:

- Matthew Harris (Irish politician) (1826–1890), Irish MP
- Matthew Harris (Australian politician) (1841–1917), mayor of Sydney
- Matthew Harris (composer) (born 1956), American composer, see Cultural depictions of Dylan Thomas
- Matthew James Harris (born 1968), Australian serial killer
- Mathew Harris, curler
- Matt Harris (screenwriter), American screenwriter
