= Matthias Yap =

Singaporean powerlifter

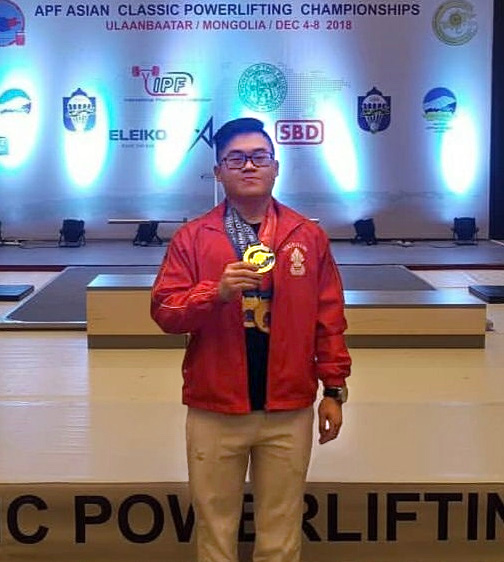
- Yap at the 2018 Asian Championships

Personal information
- Full name: Matthias Yap Zhe Yao
- Nationality: Singaporean
- Born: September 27, 2000 (age 26)
- Height: 167 cm (5 ft 6 in)
- Weight: 74kg (163lb)

Sport
- Country: Singapore
- Sport: Powerlifting
- Weight class: 74kg (163lbs)
Medal record
Representing Singapore
Asian Championship
Silver medal – second place	2017 Kerala	Squat
Bronze medal – third place	2017 Kerala	Bench Press
Silver medal – second place	2017 Kerala	Deadlift
Silver medal – second place	2017 Kerala	Total/Overall
Gold medal – first place	2018 Ulaanbataar	Squat
Gold medal – first place	2018 Ulaanbataar	Bench Press
Gold medal – first place	2018 Ulaanbataar	Deadlift
Gold medal – first place	2018 Ulaanbataar	Total/Overall
South East Asian Cup
Silver medal – second place	2022 Malaysia	Squat
Silver medal – second place	2022 Malaysia	Bench Press
Bronze medal – third place	2022 Malaysia	Total/Overall
Asian Championship
Silver medal – second place	2017 Kerala	Squat
Bronze medal – third place	2017 Kerala	Bench Press
Silver medal – second place	2017 Kerala	Deadlift
Silver medal – second place	2017 Kerala	Total/Overall
Gold medal – first place	2018 Ulaanbataar	Squat
Gold medal – first place	2018 Ulaanbataar	Bench Press
Gold medal – first place	2018 Ulaanbataar	Deadlift
Gold medal – first place	2018 Ulaanbataar	Total/Overall
South East Asian Cup
Silver medal – second place	2022 Malaysia	Squat
Silver medal – second place	2022 Malaysia	Bench Press
Bronze medal – third place	2022 Malaysia	Total/Overall

Matthias Yap Zhe Yao (Chinese: 叶哲尧; pinyin: Yè Zhéyáo; born 27 September 2000) is a Singaporean Powerlifter. He is an Asian Champion and a two-time National Champion under the International Powerlifting Federation (IPF). coached under CoachbyMARC, founded by his elder brother, Marcus Yap.

He made his first international competition debut at the 2017 Asian Classic Powerlifting Championships held in Kerala, India where he came in 2nd, winning a Silver Medal. He also competed in the 2018 Asian Classic Powerlifting Championships held in Ulaanbaatar, Mongolia and won his first Gold Medal at an international meet. He attempted the Asian squat record of 213 kg in the same competition but was unsuccessful. He is a two-time National Record Holder in the U74 Sub Junior Category.

== Biography ==
Matthias Yap was born and raised in Singapore. Coached by his eldest brother, Marcus Yap, he started competing in national competitions in 2015 at the age of 15 and made his debut on the international platform in 2017, winning the Silver medal in the Asian Classic Championships held in Kerala, India. He then proceeded to the 2018 Asian Championships held in Ulaanbaatar, Mongolia to become the Asian Champion.

He has 2 older brothers, Marcus and Matthew, who also compete for Powerlifting Singapore and are multiple Asian Champions and World record holders.

Yap handles media relations and finance for CoachbyMARC, a coaching company that specialises in Powerlifting and Strength & Conditioning founded by his brother Marcus Yap.

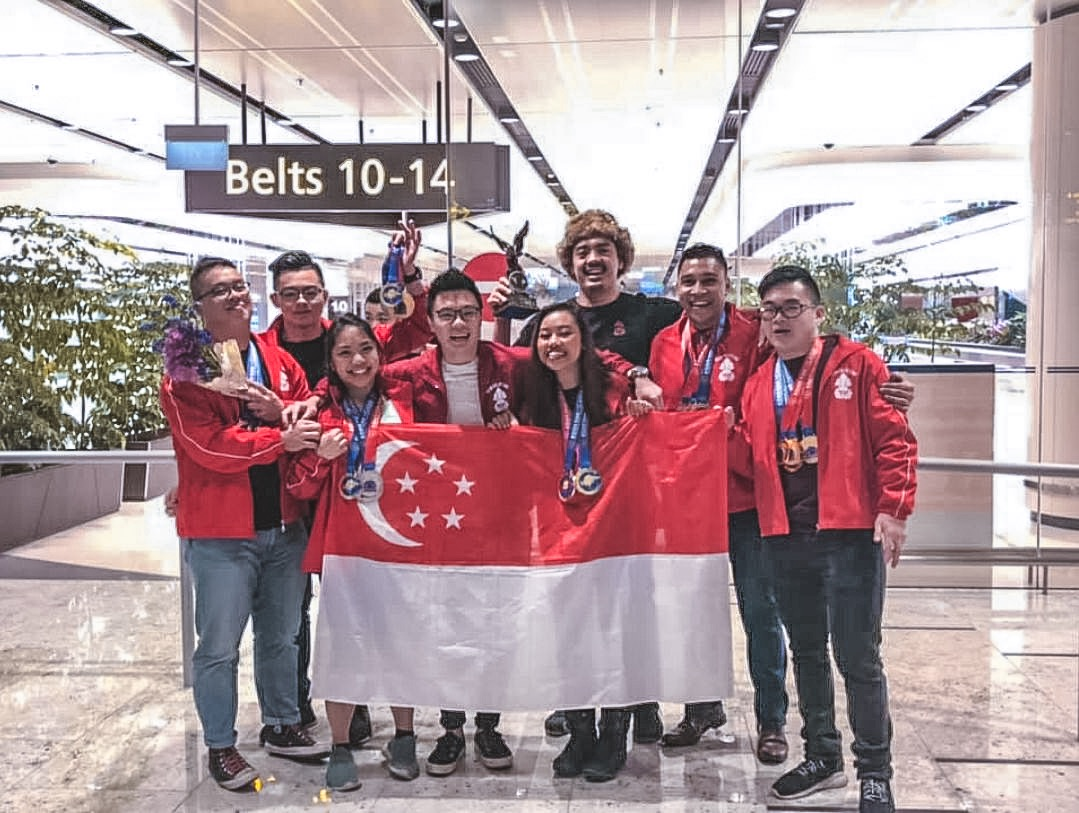
CoachbyMARC, after the Asian Championships, Dec 2018.

== Achievements ==
1. Asian Classic Powerlifting Championships 2017 Kerala India (Under 74 kg, Sub Junior), Silver in the Squat (182.5 kg), Bronze in the Bench Press (100 kg), Silver in the Deadlift (202.5 kg), Silver in the Total/Overall (485 kg)
2. Singapore Powerlifting Invitational 2018 (Under 74 kg, Sub Junior) - Champion, National record in the Squat and Deadlift.
3. Asian Classic Powerlifting Championships 2018 Ulaanbaatar Mongolia (Under 74 kg Sub Junior), Gold in the Squat (200 kg), Gold in the Bench Press (110 kg), Gold in the Deadlift (227.5 kg), and Gold in the Total/Overall (537.5 kg)
4. Singapore Powerlifting Open 2021 (Under 74kg Junior Category) - Champion
5. South East Asian Cup 2022 (Under 74kg Junior Category) - Silver in the Squat (222.5kg), Silver in the Bench Press (125kg), Bronze in the Total/Overall (580kg)
