= Matthew Lewis =

Matthew Lewis or Matt Lewis may refer to:

== Arts and media ==
- Matthew Butler (Tiswas) (born 1974), British child performer who appeared on Tiswas, now known as Matthew Lewis
- Matthew Lewis (actor) (born 1989), English actor, best known for portraying Neville Longbottom in the Harry Potter films
- Matthew Lewis (cinematographer), cinematographer on 2025 British drama series Adolescence
- Matthew Lewis (photographer) (born 1930), American photographer and editor
- Matthew Lewis (writer) (1775–1818), British Gothic novelist and dramatist
- Matthew Dennis Lewis, American actor
- Matthew Jay Lewis, British actor
- Matty Lewis (born 1975), American singer and co-frontman of the Rock band Zebrahead

== Sport ==
- Matt Lewis (basketball) (born 1998), American basketball player
- Matt Lewis (soccer) (born 1996), American soccer player
- Matt Lewis (wheelchair rugby) (born 1987), Australian wheelchair rugby player
- Matthew Lewis (footballer) (born 1990), Australian association football (soccer) player for A-League side Central Coast Mariners

== Others ==
- Matt K. Lewis, American political blogger, commentator, and contributor to The Daily Beast
