= Matthew Quick (artist) =

Australian artist

- Known for: Painting
- Website: matthewquick.com.au

Matthew Quick (born 1967 in Adelaide) is an Australian artist. He was a finalist for the Doug Moran Prize in 2013 and the Archibald, Wynn & Sulman Prizes, the latter administered by the Art Gallery of NSW, in 2012 and 2014.

Quick's works usually consist of thematically and stylistically linked series. The series Introduced Species from 2011 inspired composer Katy Abbott's symphonic piece of the same name, and was performed by the Melbourne Symphony Orchestra in 2014, and he has collaborated with her on three of her CD covers. His painting Remedial Measures was purchased by Coffs Harbour Regional Gallery in New South Wales for its permanent collection after winning the Sponsor's Prize in 2013 Eutick Memorial Still Life Awards.

He has painted portraits of several prominent Australians, including actresses Sigrid Thornton and Cassandra Magrath, comedians Wil Anderson and Hamish Blake, and convicted lawyer Andrew Fraser.

Based in Melbourne, he has had 16 solo exhibitions. His work has been included in more than 100 group shows.

He is represented by Hill Smith Gallery in Adelaide Lennox St Gallery in Melbourne and others in London and Singapore. His work is in the collections of Perc Tucker Regional Gallery, Aitken Hill Estate, and private collections throughout the world.

== Work ==
=== Pure series, 2008–2010 and 2012 ===
Picturing a series of inanimate objects against cloud-filled skyscapes, the 46 paintings employ an intensive process of applying layers of glazes to achieve their colours. The title of each painting refers to human traits and ideals: Tenacity, Humility, Freedom, and Hope being examples. And while bearing a resemblance to the work of René Magritte, it differs from Surrealism in that unexpected objects are not randomly but deliberately linked to tell specific stories and allow the viewer multiple interpretations.

=== Monumental Nobodies series, 2012-16, 2020-23 ===
Inspired by the rise and fall of various historical world empires, and the subsequent statuary left behind, this series of more than 40 oil paintings on Italian linen depict actual monuments from around the world with Quick's added twist. History Is Written By the Victors is a 120-by-100 centimetre painting of Kyiv's Mother of the Motherland, a 335-foot statue made during the Soviet era which the artist notes "was just ten years old before being rendered irrelevant." Quick outfits her with a plethora of satellite dishes. To the Victor Go the Spoils, is a 100-by-180 centimetre painting of the Soviet war memorial in Berlin's Tiergarten, a former pocket of East Berlin, surrounded by dumpster bins. Quick visited the monument three months after the fall of the Berlin Wall yet the round-the-clock security continued, for a time before being replaced by weeds. As Hungarian art and culture magazine MashKulture wrote, "The arising ironic undertone provides the perfect foundation for a revisionist take on the notions of beauty, pride, and nationalism." A monograph book "Based On a True Story", published in 2015, covers 10 years of Quick's work.

== Prior careers ==
After completing a Bachelor of Design at the University of South Australia, Quick worked in Melbourne, Sydney, London and Kuala Lumpur. Early clients include World Expo 88, Parliament House, Canberra, and Rio Tinto Group. He illustrated children's books and wrote novels: His first was short-listed for the Vogel Literature Award in 1991.

He began collaborating with the publisher Carlos Rashid Hitam through a job with an international advertising agency. Following Carlos's death in the Highland Towers collapse, Quick was invited by Musa Hitam to run his son's Malaysia-based publishing business. Quick later founded the advertising agency, Q&A. After overcoming cancer at the age of 36, Quick turned to painting.

=== Works as illustrator ===
- Which Way Now? (by Josephine Croser) (Douglas & McIntyre, 1987) ISBN 0-920841-35-X
- Firestorm! (by Roger Vaughan Carr) (Puffin Books, 1989)
- Seashores & Shadows (by Colin Thiele) (1998)
- What Came Out of My Bean (by Brian Birchall)
