= Marcus Yap =

Singaporean powerlifting coach

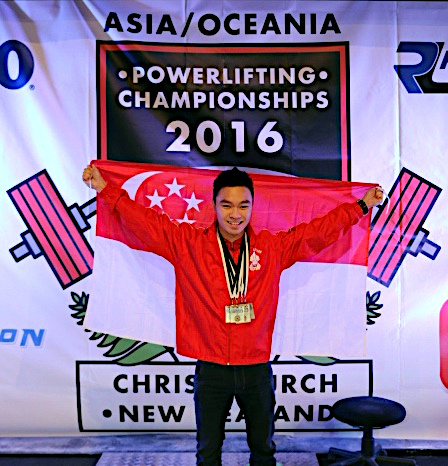
- Yap at the Asian Oceania Championships 2016

Personal information
- Full name: Marcus Yap Zhe Mian
- Born: 30 January 1994 (age 32) Singapore
- Height: 165 cm (5 ft 5 in)
- Weight: 59 kg (130 lb)

Sport
- Country: Singapore
- Sport: Powerlifting
- Weight class: 59kg
Medal record
Representing Singapore
World Championship
Gold medal – first place	2015 Salo	Squat
Silver medal – second place	2015 Salo	Deadlift
Silver medal – second place	2015 Salo	Total/Overall
Asia & Oceania Championship
Gold medal – first place	2014 Melbourne	Total/Overall
Gold medal – first place	2016 Christchurch	Squat
Gold medal – first place	2016 Christchurch	Bench Press
Gold medal – first place	2016 Christchurch	Deadlift
Gold medal – first place	2016 Christchurch	Total/Overall
Asian Championship
Gold medal – first place	2017 Kerala	Squat
Silver medal – second place	2017 Kerala	Bench Press
Gold medal – first place	2017 Kerala	Deadlift
Gold medal – first place	2017 Kerala	Total/Overall

Marcus Yap Zhe Mian (born 30 January 1994) is a Singaporean Powerlifting coach and powerlifter. He became the first Singaporean to break a powerlifting world record and win a medal at a world championship. In his career, he has broken two world records and six Asian records. He led the Singapore team to victory in several Asian Championships as well as coaching his younger brother, Matthew Yap, to break a total of four world records.

== Early life ==
With a background in Badminton and being nominated to represent Singapore in the Youth Olympic Games, Marcus picked up the sport of Powerlifting in and has competed in several international competitions like the Asia & Oceania Championships 2014 held in Melbourne, Australia, the 3rd IPF World Classic Championships held in Salo, Finland, the Asia & Oceania Championships 2016 held in Christchurch, New Zealand and the Asian Championships 2017 held in Kerala, India.

Yap developed a passion for coaching shortly after, and started in his household. Under the influence of Marcus, both of his younger brothers, Matthew Yap and Matthias Yap, picked up the sport of Powerlifting and are currently Asian Champions and have broken several world records as well.

== Powerlifting career ==
Yap started Powerlifting in 2012 and made his international debut at the end of 2014 winning the Asia & Oceania Championship title. In 2015, he competed in the IPF World Championships and became the first Singaporean to break a world record in Powerlifting. This was the start of his medal haul which also sparked his passion for coaching.

== Coaching career ==
Yap has coached a team of athletes on the international platform, including his two younger brothers, Matthew and Matthias, who competed in the International Powerlifting Federation (IPF)'s Asian Championships in 2016, 2017 & 2018, and who have broken several Asian and World records. He also led the first Singaporean, Farhanna Farid, to achieve a gold medal in an international competition in the Women's Open category.

=== Asia & Oceania Championships 2016 (Christchurch, New Zealand) ===
Yap coached his younger brother, Matthew, who later made his debut on the international platform winning his first ever Asian title with 4 gold medals.

=== 5th IPF World Classic Championships 2017 (Minsk, Belarus) ===
Yap coached his younger brother, Matthew to breaking the squat World record and set it at 208 kg and to claim a Silver Total/Overall, becoming Ranked #2 in the Under 66 kg, Sub Junior category. This was Marcus' first appearance at a World Championship event to solely coach.

=== Asian Classic Championships 2017 (Kerala, India) ===
Yap coached both his younger brothers, Matthew & Matthias and both were victorious. Matthew became the Asian Champion and also broke three world records in two categories (squat & total/overall), while Matthias got the silver medal. This was Matthias' debut on the international platform.

=== Asian Classic Championships 2018 (Ulaanbaatar, Mongolia) ===
Yap coached and led an entire team to victory in this competition. With the results of:

Matthew Yap won the Asian Championship with a gold medal in the Total/Overall and set a new Asian squat record at 248 kg in the Men's Under 74 kg Junior category.

Matthias Yap won the Asian Championship with a gold medal in the Total/Overall in the Men's Under 74 kg Sub Junior category.

Farhanna Farid, the first Singaporean to get a gold medal total/overall in the Open category. She competed in the Women's Under 52 kg Open category.

Venus Tang won the silver medal in the total/overall in the Women's Under 57 kg Open category.

Yeong Qing Quan won the bronze medal in the total/overall in the Men's Under 93 kg Junior category.

== International competitions ==
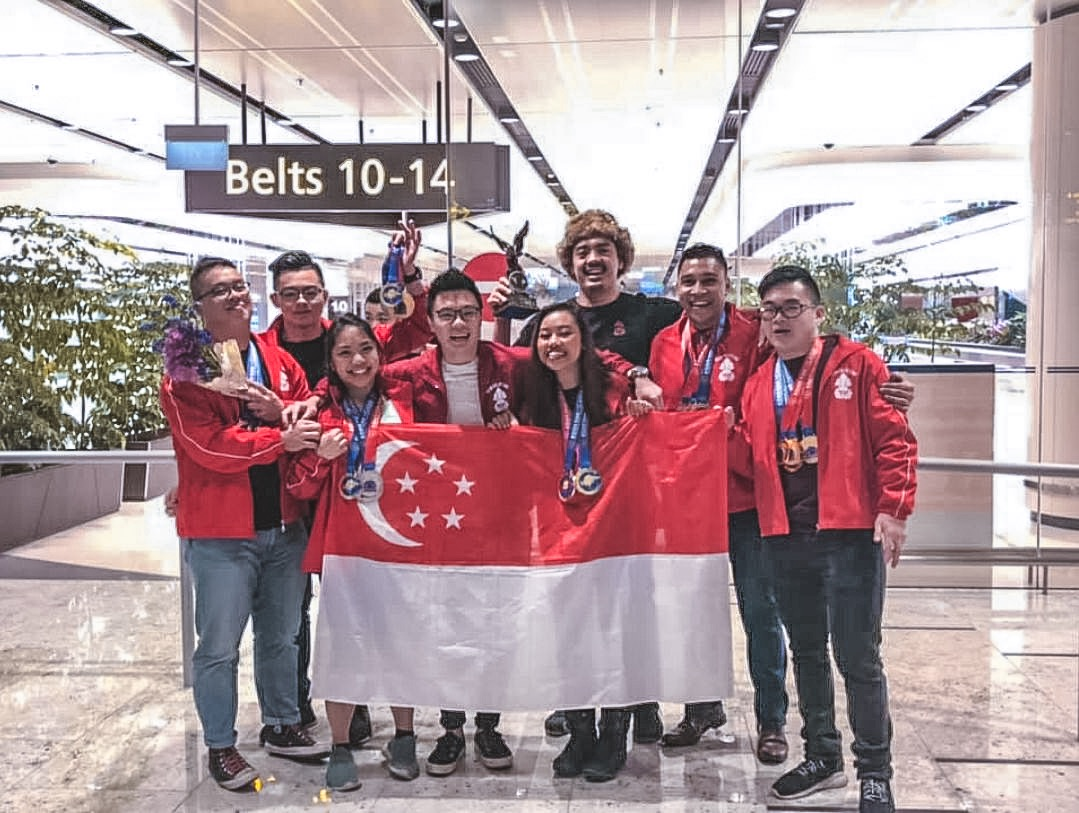
CoachbyMARC, after the Asian Championships, Dec 2018.

=== Asia & Oceania Championships 2014 (Melbourne, Australia) ===
Yap won his first Asian title with a cumulative total of 497.5 kg in the Men's Under 59 kg Junior category and also claimed his first Asian record in the Squat at 185 kg.

=== 3rd IPF World Classic Championships 2015 (Salo, Finland) ===
Yap won a silver medal and was ranked #2 in the world in his respective category. He also broke his first World record in the Deadlift at 223 kg, which was Singapore's first world record and ended off with a gold medal in the squat at 185 kg, a silver medal in the deadlift at 223 kg and a silver medal in the total/overall at 523 kg.

=== Asia & Oceania Championships 2016 (Christchurch, New Zealand) ===
Yap retained his title with the gold medal and a world record total/overall at 536 kg. He also broke the Asian record and obtained the gold medal in the squat at 196 kg, a gold in the bench press of 117.5 kg, a gold in the deadlift of 222.5 kg.

In this competition, also obtained Singapore's first Open gold medal on an international platform.

=== Asian Classic Championships 2017 (Kerala, India) ===
Yap defended his Asian champion title with a Total/Overall at 522.5 kg. He obtained a gold medal in the squat at 187.5 kg, a silver medal in the bench press at 110 kg and a gold medal in the Deadlift at 225 kg. He also won the Best Lifter award by Wilks in the Men's Open category.

== Achievements ==
1. Schoolyard Meet 2014 (Under 59 kg, Junior) - Gold, Best Lifter by Wilks (2nd)
2. Asia & Oceania Championships 2016 (Under 59 kg, Junior) - Gold Total/Overall, National & Asian record in the Squat (185 kg)
3. Singapore Powerlifting Open 2015 (Under 59 kg, Junior) - Gold Total/Overall, National record in the Squat (185 kg) and Deadlift (222.5 kg)
4. 3rd IPF World Classic Championships 2015 (Under 59 kg, Junior) - Silver Total/Overall, Gold in the Squat (185 kg), Silver in the Deadlift (223 kg) and Silver in the Total/Overall (523 kg). National, Asian and World record in the Deadlift and national record in the Total/Overall.
5. Asia & Oceania Championships 2016 (Under 59 kg, Open) - Gold Total/Overall. Gold in the Squat (196 kg), Gold in the Bench Press (117.5 kg), Gold in the Deadlift (222.5 kg) and Gold in the Total/Overall (536 kg). National and Asian record in the Squat.
6. Asia Classic Championships 2017 (Under 59 kg, Junior) - Gold Total/Overall. Gold in the Squat (187.5 kg), Silver in the Bench Press (110 kg), Gold in the Deadlift (225 kg) and Gold in the Total/Overall (522.5 kg). National record in the Deadlift.
7. Singapore Powerlifting Invitational 2018 (Under 59 kg, Junior) - Gold Total/Overall
