= Robert Manno =

Robert Manno (born 1944, Bryn Mawr, Pa) was the composer of numerous chamber and orchestral works, song cycles and solo piano and choral works. The Atlanta Audio Society called him "a composer of serious music of considerable depth and spiritual beauty." Ned Rorem described his music as “maximally personal and expressive” and Fanfare Magazine said: "his instrumental compositions are shot through with powerful lyrical impulses...Manno’s music, in whatever guise, always sings."

== Biography ==
After early instruction in piano and violin, Manno had a brief career as a jazz pianist in Philadelphia, then studied voice with Dolores Ferraro and composition with Romeo Cascarino. He moved to New York in 1965 studying jazz piano with John Mehegan and Steve Kuhn and voice with Cornelius Reid. He later continued his composition studies at the 28th Annual Composers Conference in Johnson, VT with Donald Erb and Mario Davidovsky.

Manno received the Ernest Bloch Award, First Prize at the Delius Festival and many Meet the Composer Grants and ASCAP Awards. His music has been performed throughout the US, Italy and Wales, UK and has been broadcast on American Public Media’s "Performance Today".

He held a degree in voice from the Manhattan School of Music and an M.A. in music composition from New York University. He was a member of both the MET Chorus (1977-2001) and NYCO Chorus (1967–77) and appeared as a baritone soloist in recital, chamber music programs, and with the Westchester Symphony and Alvin Ailey Dance Company. After leaving the MET Chorus, he served as an assistant conductor at the MET in 2002, working backstage on Rigoletto and Falstaff (with James Levine and Bryn Terfel).

He and his wife, former MET violinist Magdalena Golczewski, resided in the Northern Catskills where they formed the Windham Chamber Music Festival, a long-running concert series. Manno served as Music Director and Conductor of the Windham Festival Chamber Orchestra and Catskill Mountain Chamber Orchestra.

Robert Manno died on June 12, 2026, in Albany, NY.
