= Matthew Fletcher =

Matthew Fletcher may refer to:

- Matthew Fletcher (mine owner and engineer) (1731–1808), Lancashire mine owner and son of Jacob
- Matthew Fletcher (footballer) (born 1992), Australian association footballer
- Matt Fletcher (basketball), American basketball coach
- Matt Fletcher (Gaelic footballer) (1914–1995), Irish footballer
- Matthew Fletcher, a fictional character in Wentworth
- Matthew (Mad Matt) Fletcher, member of Shai Hulud
