= Matthew Davis (physicist) =

New Zealand/Australian physicist

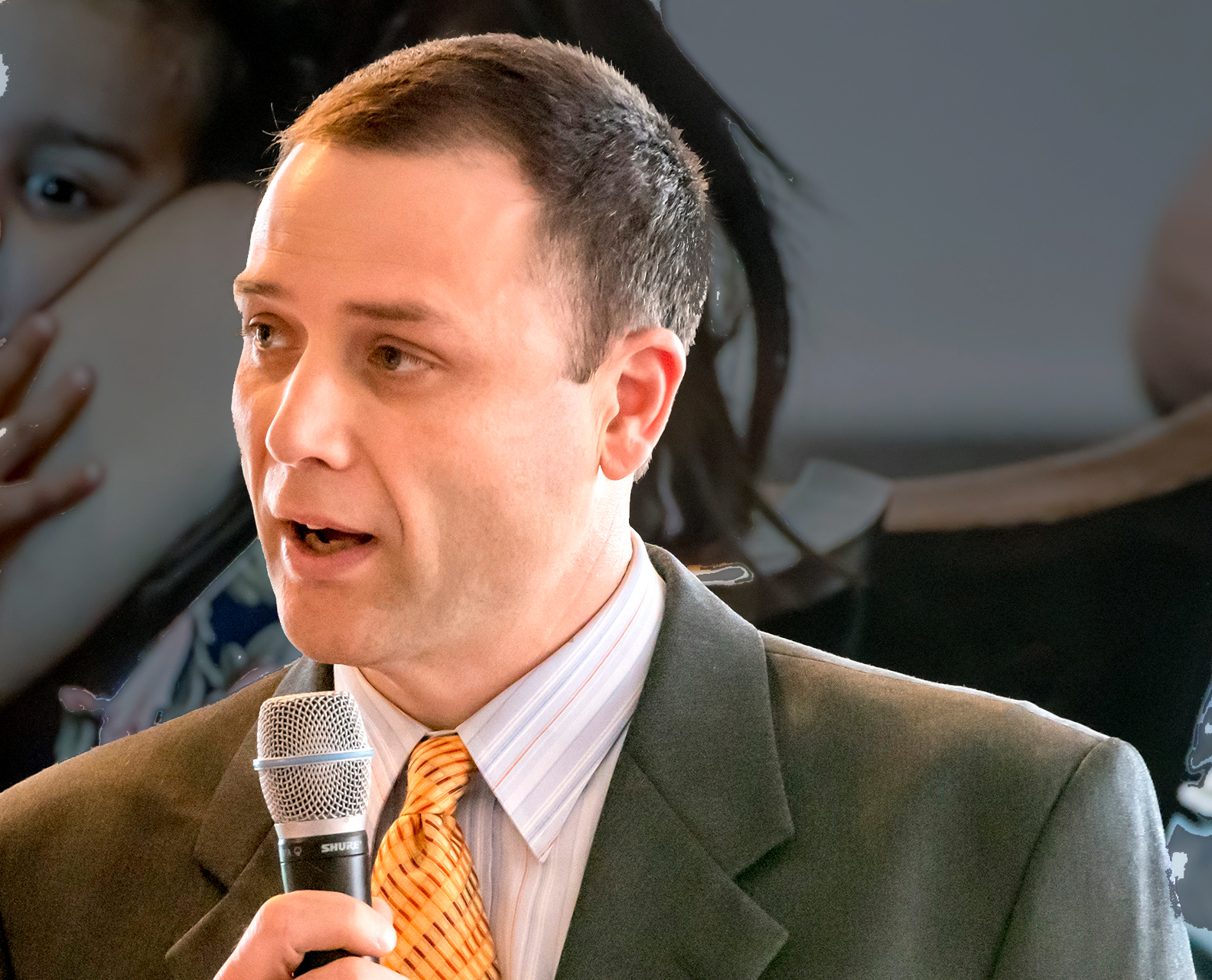
- Matthew Davis, June 2018
- Education: University of Otago (BSc(Hons)), University of Oxford (D.Phil.)
- Known for: vortex dynamics, superfluidity in Bose–Einstein condensates
- Scientific career
- Fields: Physics
- Workplaces: University of Queensland; University of Oxford; ARC Centre of Excellence in Future Low-Energy Electronics Technologies (FLEET)
- Doctoral advisor: Sir Keith Burnett

Matthew Davis is a New Zealand/Australian physicist, and is head of Physics at the University of Queensland, Australia. He is known for his work on the dynamics of vortices and superfluidity in Bose–Einstein condensates, particularly at finite temperatures.

== Expertise ==
- Nonequilibrium dynamics, superfluidity, turbulence and vortices in Bose–Einstein condensates
- Dynamics of phase transitions and formation of topological defects
- Relaxation and thermodynamics of isolated quantum systems
- Generation of non-classical correlations and entanglement
- Computational methods for quantum systems.

== Career ==
Davis received a BSc(Hons) from the University of Otago in New Zealand in 1997 and a D.Phil. (in atomic and laser physics) from the University of Oxford in the United Kingdom in 2001.

Davis was an EPSRC Postdoctoral Research Fellow in Theoretical Physics at the University of Oxford in the UK 2001, a UQ Postdoctoral Research Fellow in the School of Mathematics and Physics at the University of Queensland in Australia 2002, became a lecturer at UQ in 2003, Senior Lecturer in 2005, Associate Professor in 2009, Professor of Theoretical Physics in 2013, and Head of Physics at UQ in 2017.

Davis is a Chief Investigator within the ARC Centre of Excellence in Future Low-Energy Electronics Technologies (FLEET) investigating novel nonequilibrium states of matter.

He is also a Chief Investigator within the ARC Centre for Engineered Quantum Systems (EQUS), studying the quantum behaviour of ultra-cold gases and Bose–Einstein condensation.

=== Publications ===
As of September 2018, Davis has co-edited one book, authored five book chapters, and published 75 journal articles, 24 conference papers, and one other publication.

Davis currently has a career h-index of 31 (31 publications with more than 31 citations), and his papers have attracted 2989 citations in total, averaging almost 40 citations per article, and with more than 1000 citations in the last four years.

==== Selected publications ====
- Observation of vortex dipoles in an oblate Bose–Einstein condensate, Physical Review Letters, 2010. [210 citations] First observation and experimental and theoretical study of multi-core vortex dipoles in a Bose-Einstein condensation – the fundamental localized excitation carrying momentum in a superfluid.
- Dynamics and statistical mechanics of ultra-cold Bose gases using c-field techniques. Advances in Physics, 2008 [239 citations] Invited review describing the c-field method and its application. Persuaded many researchers to make use of this method, and is becoming a standard reference.
- Spontaneous vortices in the formation of Bose–Einstein condensates. Nature, 2008 [273 citations] The first observation and understanding via theoretical simulation of spontaneous rotation of a BEC formed from the cooling of a Bose gas.

=== Recognition ===
- 2018: Divisional Associate Editor, Physical Review Letters
- 2016: Editorial Fellow, SciPost Physics
- 2016: Fellow of the American Institute of Physics
- 2015: JILA Visiting Fellow, University of Colorado
- 2015: American Physical Society Outstanding Referee.
- 2012: Australian Learning and Teaching Council Citation for Outstanding Contribution to Student Learning.
- 2011: Queensland Tall Poppy Award.
- 2011: University of Queensland Citation for Outstanding Contribution to Student Learning.
- 2010: Australian Research Council Queen Elizabeth II Fellowship.
- 2007: University of Queensland Foundation Research Excellence Award.
- 2007: EPSA Faculty Teaching Excellence Award.
- 2002: University of Queensland Postdoctoral Research Fellowship.
- 2001: EPSRC Fellowship in Theoretical Physics, University of Oxford
- 1998: North Senior Scholarship, St John's College, University of Oxford
- 1997: Commonwealth Scholarship, University of Oxford
