= Matthew Lopez =

Matthew Lopez may refer to:

- Matthew López (writer) (born 1977), American playwright and screenwriter
- Matthew Lopez (fighter) (born 1987), American mixed martial artist
- Matthew Lopez (art researcher) (born 1993), Filipino art researcher, curator, art advisor, and author
