= Matthew Miller =

Matthew or Matt Miller may refer to:

== Arts and entertainment ==
- Matt K. Miller (born 1960), American voice actor
- Matisyahu (Matthew Paul Miller, born 1979), American musician and reggae performer
- Matthew Mercer (Matthew Christopher Miller, born 1982), American voice actor
- Matt Miller (musician) (fl. 2002), American musician, bassist for the post-hardcore band Sparta
- Matthew Miller (drummer) (fl. 2007–2017), American musician, drummer for Cymbals Eat Guitars
- Matthew Miller (filmmaker) Canadian screenwriter and producer
- Matt Miller (The Young and the Restless), a character from the CBS soap opera The Young and the Restless

== Sports ==
=== American football ===
- Matt Miller (offensive lineman) (born 1956), American football offensive lineman
- Matt Miller (wide receiver) (born 1991), American football wide receiver
- Matt Miller (quarterback) (fl. 1995), American football quarterback

=== Other sports ===
- Matt Miller (baseball, born 1971) (born 1971), American MLB baseball pitcher with the Colorado Rockies and Cleveland Indians
- Matt Miller (baseball, born 1974) (born 1974), American MLB baseball pitcher with the Detroit Tigers
- Matthew Miller (basketball) (born 1982), American basketball player for Rwandan national team
- Matthew Miller (rower) (born 1989), American rower

== Others ==
- Matt Miller (mayor), American politician
- Matthew Miller (journalist) (born 1962), American journalist and broadcaster
- Matthew Todd Miller (born 1989), American citizen detained in North Korea in 2014
- Matthew Miller (physician), American physician and professor at Harvard School of Public Health
- Matthew Miller (spokesperson) (born 1973 or 1974), American communications operative and spokesperson for the United States Department of State from 2023 to 2025
