= Matthew Walker =

Matthew Walker may refer to:

== Actors ==
- Matthew Walker (American actor) (born 1968), American actor
- Matthew Walker (Australian actor) (born 1979), New Zealand-Australian actor
- Matthew Walker (Canadian actor) (born 1942), English film and television actor in Canada

== Politics ==
- Matthew Walker (Vermont politician)

== Sportspeople ==
- Matthew Walker (English cricketer) (born 1974), English cricketer
- Matthew Walker (New Zealand cricketer) (born 1977), cricketer from New Zealand
- Matthew Walker (swimmer) (born 1978), English swimmer

== Science ==
- Matthew Walker Sr. (1906–1978), African-American physician and surgeon
- Matthew Walker (scientist) (born c. 1972), professor of neuroscience and psychology

== See also ==
- Matt Walker (disambiguation)
- Matthew Walker knot, a decorative knot
- Robert Matthew-Walker (born 1939), English writer, broadcaster and composer
