= Matt Anderson =

Matt or Matthew Anderson may refer to:

- Matthew Anderson (politician) (1822–1910), American politician
- Matthew Smith Anderson (1922–2006), professor of history
- Matt Anderson (windsurfer) (born 1968), Puerto Rican windsurfer
- Matthew Tobin Anderson (born 1968), American author
- Matthew P. Anderson, American aerospace executive and retired United States Air Force colonel
- Matt Anderson (baseball) (born 1976), Major League Baseball relief pitcher
- Matthew Anderson (cricketer) (born 1976), Australian cricketer
- Matt Anderson (ice hockey) (born 1982), American ice hockey player
- Matt Anderson (volleyball) (born 1987), volleyball player
- Matt Anderson (Primeval), played by Ciaran McMenamin, a fictional character in Primeval (2007–2011)

== See also ==
- Matt Andersen, Canadian blues guitarist and singer-songwriter
