= Matthew Turner =

Matthew, Mathew, or Matt Turner may refer to:

== Sports ==
- Matt Turner (baseball) (1967–2019), American Major League Baseball pitcher
- Matt Turner (soccer) (born 1994), American soccer goalkeeper
- Mathew Turner (born 1988), South Africa-born English rugby union player
- Matthew Turner (chess player) (born 1975), British chess grandmaster
- Matthew Turner (cricketer) (born 1973), English cricketer
- Matthew Turner (footballer, born 1981), English footballer
- Matthew Turner (footballer, born 2002), Welsh football goalkeeper
- Matt Turner (long jumper) (born 1986), American long jumper, 2008 NCAA runner-up for the Arizona State Sun Devils track and field
- Matthew Turner (wheelchair rugby league player, born 2009)

team

== Other ==
- Matt Turner, one of Jeffrey Dahmer's 17 victims
- Matt Turner (Neighbours), a fictional character from the Australian soap opera Neighbours
- Matthew Turner (physician) (died 1788), British physician, author and atheist
- Matthew Turner (shipbuilder) (1825–1909), American sea captain, shipbuilder and designer
  - Matthew Turner (ship), a modern wooden tall ship named for the shipbuilder
