= Matthew Agarwala =

British economist

Matthew Agarwala (born 1986) is a British economist, and the Bennett professor of sustainable finance at the University of Sussex.

In 2020, he earned a PhD in Environmental and Resource Economics from the London School of Economics.

In 2025, Agarwala spoke at the Lib Dem conference on a panel organised by Total Politics, but invitations to similar panels at forthcoming Labour and Conservative conferences were cancelled after he expresseed scepticism of the economic impact of North Sea oil.

He is married to Patrycja "Pati" Klusak, who is Professor of Accounting and Finance at Edinburgh Business School.
