= Matthew Smith =

Matt Smith (born 1982) is an English actor.

Matthew or Matt Smith may also refer to:

== Artists ==
- Matthew Smith (painter) (1879–1959), British painter
- Matthew Dow Smith, American comic book artist
- Matt Smith (comics editor) (born 1972), British comic book editor
- Matt Smith (illustrator), American children's magazine illustrator and album cover artist

== Entertainers ==
- Matt Smith (drummer), jazz percussionist
- Matt Smith (guitarist), guitarist for the Australian band Thirsty Merc
- Matt Smith (musician), guitar player for the glam rock band Paris
- Matt "Money" Smith (born 1973), Southern California radio personality
- Matt Smith (TV reporter), entertainment correspondent

== Politics ==
- Matt Smith (Tasmanian politician) (born 1978), member of the Tasmanian state parliament
- Matt Smith (Queensland politician) (born 1979), member of the Australian parliament, former basketball player
- Matthew H. Smith (born 1972), member of the Pennsylvania State Senate
- Matthew Smith (Canadian politician) (1842–1909), farmer, hotel owner and political figure in Prince Edward Island, Canada
- Matthew Smith (colonial secretary) (1836–1887), former acting Colonial Secretary of Western Australia
- Matthew Smith (Irish politician) (died 1955), Irish Fianna Fáil politician
- Matthew Smith (Pennsylvania statesman) (1734–1794), Vice-President (Lt. Gov.) of Pennsylvania

== Sports ==
=== Association football ===
- Mattha Smith (1897–1953), Scottish footballer
- Matt Smith (soccer, born 1982), English-born Australian professional soccer defender
- Matt Smith (footballer, born 1989), English professional football striker
- Matty Smith (footballer, born 1997), Scottish footballer with Dundee United
- Matthew Smith (footballer, born 1999), Wales international football midfielder
- Matt Smith (footballer, born 2000), English professional football midfielder

=== Rugby ===
- Matt Smith (rugby union, born 1985), rugby union player with Leicester Tigers
- Matty Smith (rugby league) (born 1987), English rugby league player for Wigan Warriors
- Matt Smith (rugby union, born 1989), rugby union player with Cornish Pirates
- Matt Smith (rugby union, born 1996), rugby union player with Glasgow Warriors

=== Other sports ===
- Matt Smith (broadcaster) (born 1967), BT Sport presenter
- Matthew Smith (field hockey) (born 1973), Australian field hockey player
- Matthew Smith (rower) (born 1977), American rower
- Matt Smith (baseball) (born 1979), American baseball pitcher
- Matthew Smith (cricketer) (born 1990), English cricketer
- Matt Smith (duathlete) (born 1996), Australian duathlete
- Matt Smith (American football) (born 1965), American football linebacker
- Matthew Smith (cross-country skier) (born 1990), a South African cross-country skier

== Other people ==
- Matthew Smith, author of JFK: The Second Plot
- Matthew Smith (games programmer) (born 1966), British computer game programmer
- Matthew Smith (labor activist) (1893–1958), British-American labor organizer
- Matthew Smith (spy), 17th-century spy and the author of Memoirs of Secret Service
- Matt Smith (born 1978), participant in The Real World: New Orleans
- Matthew Smith, model, contestant in America's Next Top Model
- Mathew C. Smith, U.S. Army brigadier general
