= Matthew Boyd (politician) =

American politician (1830–??)

Matthew Boyd (1830–?) was a farmer and politician in Alabama. He was born in Virginia. He was elected to the Alabama House of Representatives in 1874 from Perry County, Alabama. He is commemorated along with other black politicians in the state who served from 1868–1879.

== See also ==
- African American officeholders from the end of the Civil War until before 1900
