= Matthew Robinson =

Matthew, Matt or Mat Robinson may refer to:

== Arts and entertainment ==
- Matt Robinson (actor) (1937–2002), American actor
- Matthew Robinson (producer) (born 1944), British-Cambodian television director and producer
- Matt Robinson (poet) (born 1974), Canadian poet
- Matthew Robinson (writer) (born 1978), American writer and director
- Matt Robinson (Neighbours) (fl. 1989–1991), character in the Australian soap opera Neighbours
- Matthew Lee Robinson (fl. 2000s–present) Australian actor, singer and composer
- Matthew Robinson (fl. 2020s), artistic director of the National Dance Company Wales

== Sportspeople ==
=== Association football ===
- Matt Robinson (footballer, born 1907) (1907–1987), English football player for Manchester United
- Matthew Robinson (footballer, born 1974), English football player
- Matthew Robinson (footballer, born 1984), English football player
- Matt Robinson (footballer, born 1993), English football player for Dagenham & Redbridge

=== Other sports ===
- Mack Robinson (athlete) (Matthew MacKenzie Robinson, 1914–2000), American track and field athlete
- Matt Robinson (American football) (born 1956), American NFL football player
- Matthew Robinson (sportsman, born 1973), Wales international rugby union player
- Matthew Robinson (snowboarder) (1985–2014), Australian Paralympic snowboarder
- Mat Robinson (born 1986), Canadian ice hockey player
- Matt Robinson (rugby league) (born 1990), New Zealand rugby league player

== Others ==
- Matthew Robinson, 2nd Baron Rokeby (1712–1800), English noble
- Matthew Robinson (priest), English cleric, Anglican divine, and physician
- Matt Robinson (American politician), American politician
- Matthew Robinson (Australian politician) (c.1850–1928), Australian politician
