= Matthew Wright =

Matt or Matthew Wright may refer to:

== Sports ==
- Matthew Wright (basketball) (born 1991), Filipino-Canadian basketball player
- Matthew Wright (Australian footballer) (born 1989), Australian rules footballer
- Matthew Wright (rugby league) (born 1991), Samoan rugby league international
- Matthew Wright (American football) (born 1996), American football player
- Matthew Wright (Scottish footballer) (born 2002), Scottish footballer
- Matthew Wright (triathlete) (born 1992), Barbadian athlete
- Matt Wright (pickleball) (born 1977), American professional pickleball player
- Mathew Wright (born 1988), Australian rugby player

== Others ==
- Matthew Wright (presenter) (born 1965), English television presenter and former tabloid journalist
- Matthew N. Wright (born 1959), Pennsylvania politician
- Matt Wright (singer), lead singer of the garage punk band Gas Huffer
- Matt Wright, actor best known for his early-1990s role as Mike in Mike and Angelo
- Matthew Wright, lead singer and guitarist of The Getaway Plan
- Matthew Phillip Wright, perpetrator of the Hoover Dam Incident, inspired by QAnon
- Matt Wright, presenter of the Australian television show Outback Wrangler

== See also ==
- Matt's Script Archive, a collection of CGI scripts started by high school student Matt Wright in 1995
