= Matthew Perry (disambiguation) =

Matthew Perry (1969–2023) was an American and Canadian actor.

Matthew Perry may also refer to:

- Matthew C. Perry (1794–1858), American naval officer who forcibly opened Japan to trade with the West
  - Matthew Perry Monument, Newport, Rhode Island
  - USNS Matthew Perry (T-AKE-9)
- Matthew J. Perry (1921–2011), South Carolina's first African-American U.S. District Court judge
- Matt Perry (born 1977), English rugby union footballer

== See also ==
- Matt Parry (born 1994), British racing driver
