= Matthew Cox (disambiguation) =

Matthew Cox may refer to:

- Matthew Cox (born 1969), American felon and con man
- Matthew Cox (rugby union) (born 1988), English rugby player
- Matthew Cox (footballer) (born 2003), English footballer
- Matt Cox (racing driver), American stock car racing driver
- Matt Cox, musician in the band Witch Hats

== See also ==
- Matthew Mason-Cox, Australian politician
- Matthew Cocks (disambiguation)
