= Matthew Jensen =

Matthew Jensen or Matt Jensen may refer to:

- Matthew Jensen (cinematographer), an American cinematographer
- Matthew Jensen (artist) (born 1980), an American artist
- Matt Jensen (rugby union) (born 1992), an American rugby union player
- Matt Jensen, a character in the 2003 sports comedy film Grind
- Matt Jensen, a character in the web television series 13 Reasons Why

== See also ==
- Matt Jansen (born 1977), English footballer
