= Matthew Lloyd (disambiguation) =

Matthew Lloyd is a former Australian rules footballer for Essendon.

Matthew Lloyd may also refer to:

- Matthew Lloyd (cyclist) (born 1983), Australian professional road bicycle racer
- Matt Lloyd (footballer) (born 1965), Australian rules footballer for the Sydney Swans
- Matt Lloyd (Paralympian) (born 1972), British ice sledge hockey paralympian
