= Matthew Miller (physician) =

American physician and epidemiologist

Matthew Jason Miller
- Born: Brooklyn, New York
- Education: Harvard School of Public Health
- Known for: Research on gun violence
- Awards: American Foundation for Suicide Prevention's Young Investigator Award
- Scientific career
- Fields: Injury prevention, epidemiology, public health
- Workplaces: Harvard School of Public Health
- Thesis: Injury and illness: predictors of suicide and collusions of misunderstanding in human experimentation (1999)

Matthew Jason Miller is an American physician and epidemiologist. He is an adjunct professor of epidemiology at the Harvard School of Public Health, where is also the co-director of the Harvard Injury Control Research Center. He is also a professor of health sciences and epidemiology at Northeastern University. He is board certified in internal medicine and medical oncology. He is known for his research into injury and violence prevention.

== Education ==
Miller received his bachelors' and medical degrees from Yale University, after which he received his M.P.H. and Sc.D. from the Harvard School of Public Health.

== Research ==
Miller is known for researching multiple topics pertaining to injury prevention, including homicide, suicide, and accidental injuries. For example, he has conducted studies on the relationship between firearm ownership, firearm laws, and suicide and homicide rates. He has also surveyed gun owners in order to estimate the number of privately owned guns in the United States, as well as how many recently acquired guns were purchased without a background check. These surveys have estimated that there are about 265 million privately owned guns in the United States, and that about one-fifth of guns purchased in the last two years were acquired without the purchaser undergoing a background check. He has also published studies on the association between high doses of antidepressants and self-harm among young people.
