= Matthew Young =

Matthew Young may refer to:

- Matthew Young (bishop) (1750–1800), mathematician and Bishop of Clonfert
- Matthew Young (born 2005), charity worker
- Matthew Young (Australian footballer) (born 1972), Australian footballer who played with Hawthorn and St. Kilda
- Matthew Young (volleyball) (born 1981), volleyball player
- Matthew Young (civil servant) (1944–2015), British civil servant
- Matt Young (born 1958), former American Major League baseball player
- Matt Young (outfielder) (born 1982), baseball outfielder
- Matt Young (footballer, born 1994), English footballer
- Matt Young (footballer, born 2003), English footballer
- Matt Young, owner of Matt Young Motorsports
- Matty Young (footballer, born 1985), English football midfielder
- Matty Young (footballer, born 2006), English football goalkeeper
