= Matthew Davies =

Matthew Davies or Matt Davies may refer to:

- Matthew Davies (figure skater) (born 1981), English figure skater
- Matthew Davies (footballer) (born 1995), Australian-Malaysian footballer
- Matthew Davies (historian), British academic
- Matthew Davies (1595–1678), Member of Parliament for Hindon and Christchurch
- Matthew Davies (died 1615), Member of Parliament for Cardiff
- Matthew Henry Davies (1850–1912), Australian politician
- Matthew W. Davies (1882–1947), Welsh musician
- Matt Davies (cartoonist) (born 1966), British-American cartoonist and children's book author and illustrator
- Matt Davies (rugby league) (born 1998), English rugby league footballer

== See also ==
- Matthew Davis (disambiguation)
- Matthew Vaughan-Davies, 1st Baron Ystwyth (1840–1935), Welsh politician
- Matthew Davies-Kreye, lead singer of the band Funeral for a Friend
