= Matthew Richardson =

Matthew or Matt Richardson may refer to:

== Sportspeople ==
- Matthew Richardson (cyclist) (born 1999), Australian track cyclist
- Matthew Richardson (cricketer) (born 1985), South African cricketer
- Matthew Richardson (footballer) (born 1975), former Richmond Football Club player
- Matthew Richardson (golfer) (born 1984), English golfer
- Matthew Richardson (administrator), Australian rules football administrator
- Matt Richardson (footballer) (born 1970), Australian rules footballer

== Academics ==
- Matthew Richardson (economist), New York University professor
- Matthew O. Richardson (born 1960), Advancement Vice President at Brigham Young University

== Others ==
- Matthew Kendal Richardson (1839–1917), English-born merchant and political figure in Ontario, Canada
- Matt Richardson (born 1991), English comedian and presenter
