= Matthew Yap =

Singaporean Powerlifter

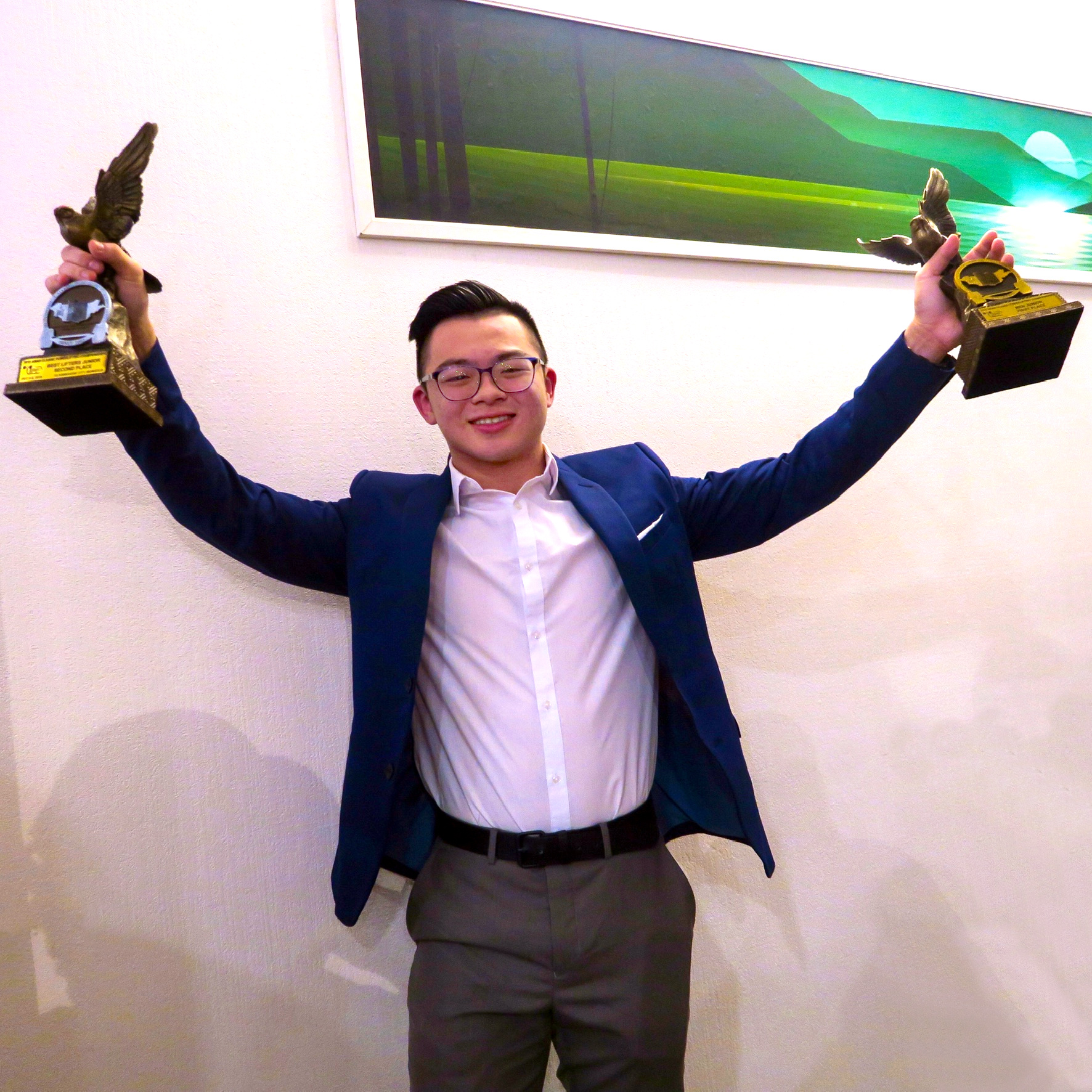
- Yap at the Asian Championships 2018

Personal information
- Full name: Matthew Yap Zhe Ren
- Nationality: Singaporean
- Born: 15 August 1999 (age 27) Singapore
- Occupation: Powerlifting Coach
- Height: 171 cm (5 ft 7 in)
- Weight: 74kg (163lb) (former) 66kg (145lb)

Sport
- Country: Singapore
- Sport: Powerlifting
- Weight class: 74kg
Medal record
Representing Singapore
World Championships
Gold medal – first place	2017 Minsk	Squat
Bronze medal – third place	2017 Minsk	Bench Press
Silver medal – second place	2017 Minsk	Total/Overall
Asian & Oceania Championships
Gold medal – first place	2016 Christchurch	Squat
Gold medal – first place	2016 Christchurch	Bench Press
Gold medal – first place	2016 Christchurch	Deadlift
Gold medal – first place	2016 Christchurch	Total/Overall
Asian Championships
Gold medal – first place	2017 Kerala	Squat
Silver medal – second place	2017 Kerala	Bench Press
Gold medal – first place	2017 Kerala	Deadlift
Gold medal – first place	2017 Kerala	Total/Overall
Gold medal – first place	2018 Ulaanbataar	Squat
Bronze medal – third place	2018 Ulaanbataar	Bench Press
Silver medal – second place	2018 Ulaanbataar	Deadlift
Gold medal – first place	2018 Ulaanbataar	Total/Overall
Gold medal – first place	2019 Almaty	Squat
Gold medal – first place	2019 Almaty	Bench Press
Gold medal – first place	2019 Almaty	Deadlift
Gold medal – first place	2019 Almaty	Total/Overall

Matthew Yap Zhe Ren, 叶哲仁 (born 15 Aug 1999) is a Singaporean Powerlifter & Coach, a 4-time Asian Champion and a World Silver medallist. He has broken 4 World records, 13 Asian records and 44 National records. He has also coached his team to several victories on the international stage.

Yap competes and represents Singapore in the International Powerlifting Federation (IPF) and has competed in the Asian & Oceania Classic Championships 2016 held in Christchurch, New Zealand where he claimed his first gold medal on the international platform, 5th World Classic Championships 2017 held in Minsk, Belarus and got a silver medal as well as his very first world record, Asian Classic Championships 2017 held in Kerala, India defending his Asian Champion title and the Asian Classic Championships 2018 held in Ulaanbaatar, Mongolia and won his third consecutive Asian Champion title.

Yap is a coach, for Powerlifting and Strength & Conditioning.

== Biography ==
Matthew Yap is born and raised in Singapore and started his Powerlifting journey at the age of 14 in 2013, coached by his elder brother, Marcus Yap.

Yap got inspired by his elder brother and started training regularly. Soon after, he participated in his first competition in December 2014 at age 14 by Powerlifting Singapore and got a silver medal. At that time, Marcus is the 2015 Asian & Oceania Championship gold medalist and also an Asian record holder.

He has two siblings, an elder brother, Marcus Yap and a younger brother, Matthias Yap who both represent Singapore in Powerlifting.

As of Dec 2019, Yap broke 4 World Records, 13 Asian Records and 44 National Records and is a four-time Asian Champion as well as a World Silver medalist.

== International career ==
=== Asia & Oceania Classic Championships 2016 (Christchurch, New Zealand) ===
Yap won his first Asian Champion title and brought home four gold medals for the individual categories in the Squat, Bench Press, Deadlift & Total. He also broke and set new Asian records in the Squat at 197 kg, the Bench Press at 123 kg and the Total at 530 kg in the Under 66 kg, Sub Junior (aged 14–18) category.

In this competition, he won the Best Lifter by Wilks in the Sub Junior category.

=== 5th IPF World Classic Championships 2017 (Minsk, Belarus) ===
Yap obtained a silver medal at a cumulative total of 555 kg which made him #2 in the Under 66 kg, Sub Junior category in the world. He also broke his first ever World record in the Squat, setting it at 208 kg which also gave him a gold medal. He finished off with a 130 kg Bench Press which earned him the Bronze and a 212.5 kg Deadlift.

=== Asian Classic Championships 2017 (Kerala, India) ===
Yap successfully defended his Asian title which was won in 2016. He also broke three World records in two categories (Squat & Total) in the Men's Under 66 kg Sub Junior category. His first World record of the competition came from his second attempt of 208.5 kg in the Squat and his second World record coming from his third attempt of 215.5 kg which earned him the gold medal. He also ended off with a 135 kg Bench Press as well as a 237.5 kg Deadlift which broke and set a new Asian record. His third world record was breaking the 5-year long standing Total record by Eddie Burgland (SWE) and set it at 588 kg.

He finished the competition with three Gold medals and one Silver medal, defeating his rival Chebanov Dmitri (KAZ) who had defeated him by a huge margin in the World Classic Championships.

In this competition, he promised his late grandmother to retain his title in honour of her.

He also won the Best Lifter (2nd) by Wilks in the Sub Junior category.

=== Asian Classic Championships 2018 (Ulaanbaatar, Mongolia) ===
Yap's hunt for his 3rd Asian title was successful and broke the Asian Squat record in the Men's Under 74 kg Junior (19-23) category. This was his first competition at a new age class and a higher weight class and ended off his competition with two Gold medals, one Silver medal and one Bronze medal. His final Squat attempt of 248 kg got him the gold medal as well as his first Asian record in this category, a bench press at 145 kg earned him a bronze medal and a deadlift at 265 kg earned him the silver medal.

In this competition, he won the Best Lifter (2nd) by Wilks in the Men's Junior category.

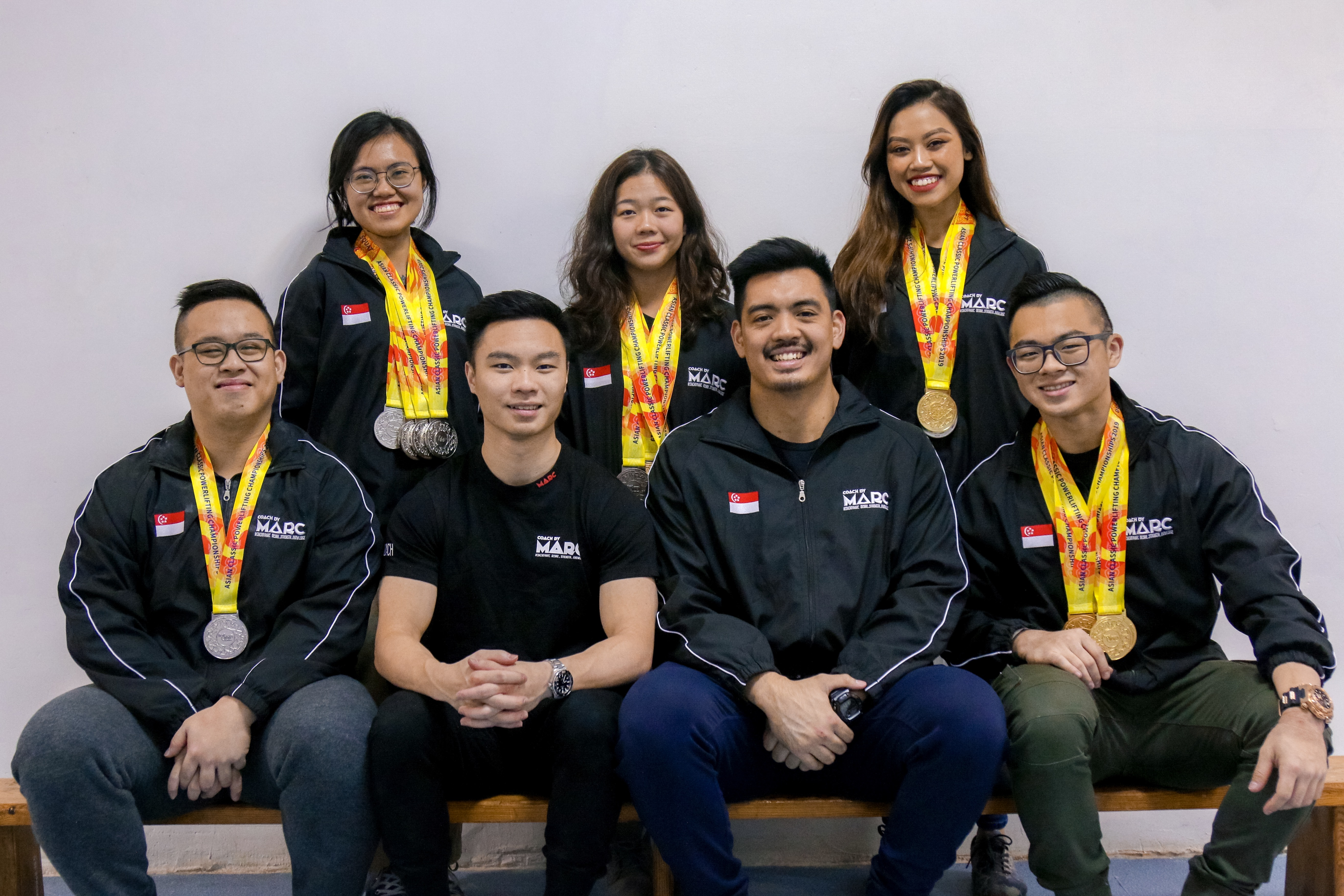
Team CoachbyMARC at the Asian Championships in Almaty, Kazakhstan. (Dec 2019)

=== Asian Classic Championships 2019 (Almaty, Kazakhstan) ===
Yap competed in the Under 74kg Junior (19-23) category and retained his Asian title, becoming the four-time Asian champion. He ended off with claiming Gold medals for all the categories, with a 245kg Squat, a 155kg Bench Press and a 275.5kg Deadlift which is also the Asian record.

He ended off with a cumulative Total of 675.5kg which broke and set a new Asian record as well.

In this competition, Yap won the Best Lifter (champion) by IPF Points in the Men's Junior category.

== Achievements ==
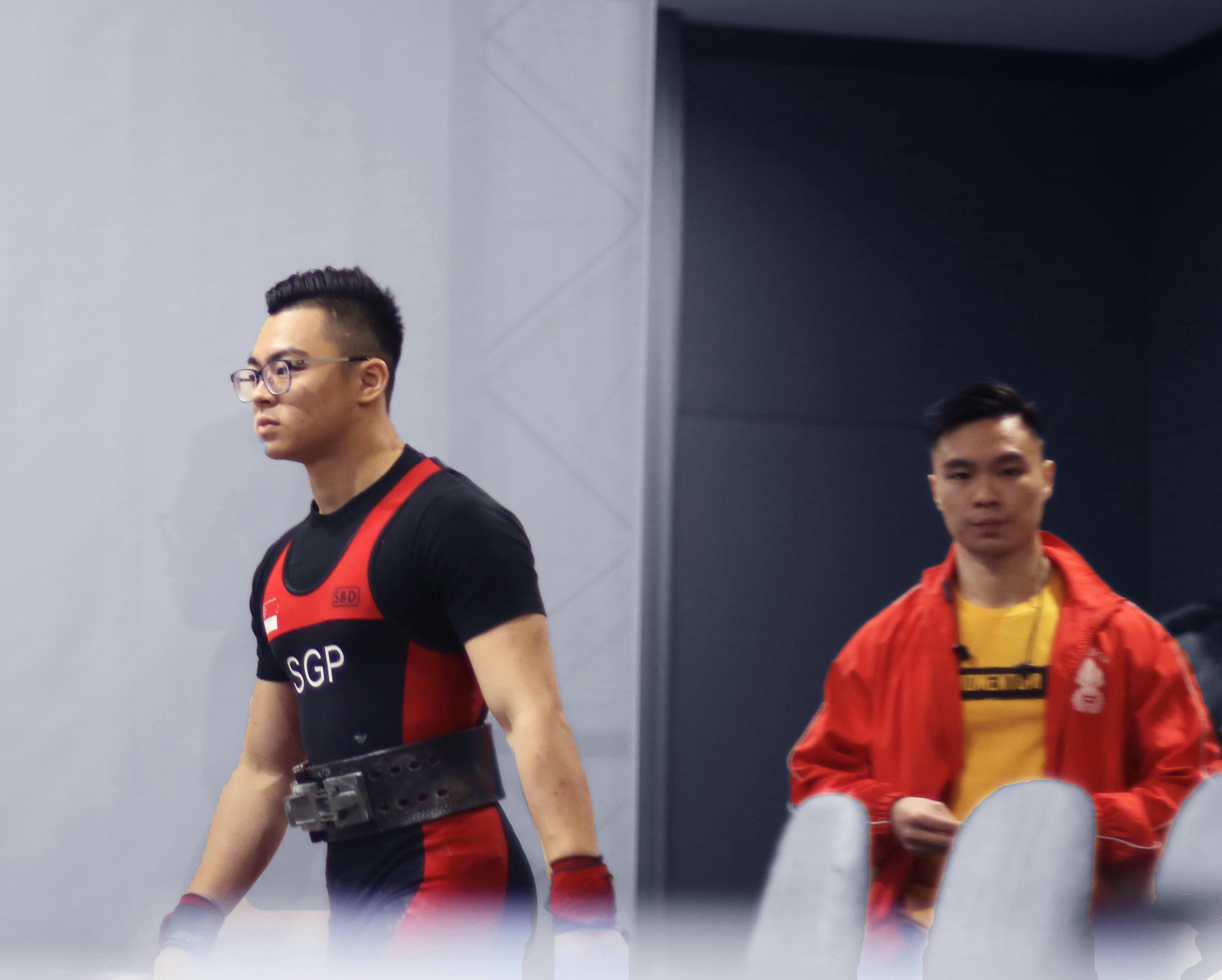
Yap and his Coach, Marcus Yap.

=== Yap's consolidated achievements ===
1. Singapore Powerlifting Open 2014 (Under 66 kg, Sub Junior) - Silver
2. Singapore Powerlifting Open 2015 (Under 66 kg, Sub Junior) - Silver
3. Singapore Powerlifting Open 2016 (Under 66 kg, Sub Junior) - Gold, Three national records in the Squat (190.5 kg), two national records in the Bench Press (111.5 kg), two national records in the Deadlift (205 kg), three national records in the Total/Overall (507 kg).
4. Asia & Oceania Classic Championships 2016 (Under 66 kg, Sub Junior), Gold in Squat (197 kg), Gold in the Bench Press (123 kg), Gold in the Deadlift, Gold in the Total/Overall (530 kg). National record and Asian record in the Squat, national record and Asian record in the Bench Press, national record in the Total/Overall.
5. Singapore Powerlifting Open 2017 (Under 74 kg, Sub Junior & Open) - Gold, Two national records in the Squat (204 kg), national record in the Bench Press (126.5 kg), national record in the Total/Overall (558 kg).
6. 5th IPF World Classic Championships 2017, Minsk Belarus (Under 66 kg, Sub Junior), Gold in the Squat (208 kg), Bronze in the Bench Press (130 kg), Silver in the Total/Overall (550 kg). National record, Asian record and World record in the Squat, two national records in the Bench Press, national record in the Deadlift, national record in the Total/Overall.
7. Asian Classic Championships 2017 (Under 66 kg, Sub Junior), Gold in the Squat (215.5 kg), Silver in the Bench Press (135 kg), Gold in the Deadlift (237.5 kg), Gold in the Total/Overall (588 kg). Two national, Asian and World records in the Squat, national record in the Bench Press, national record and Asian record in the Deadlift. National record, Asian record and World record in the Total/Overall.
8. Singapore Powerlifting Invitational 2018 (Under 74 kg, Junior), National record in the Squat (240.5 kg) and national record in the Total/Overall (630 kg).
9. Asian Classic Championships 2018 (Under 74 kg, Junior), Gold in the Squat (248 kg), Bronze in the Bench Press (150 kg), Silver in the Deadlift (265 kg), Gold in the Total/Overall (663 kg). National and Asian record in the Squat.
10. Asian Classic Championships 2019 (Under 74 kg, Junior), Gold in the Squat (245 kg), Gold in the Bench Press (155 kg), Gold in the Deadlift (275 kg), Gold in the Total/Overall (675.5 kg). Asian record in the Deadlift and Total.

== Coaching career ==
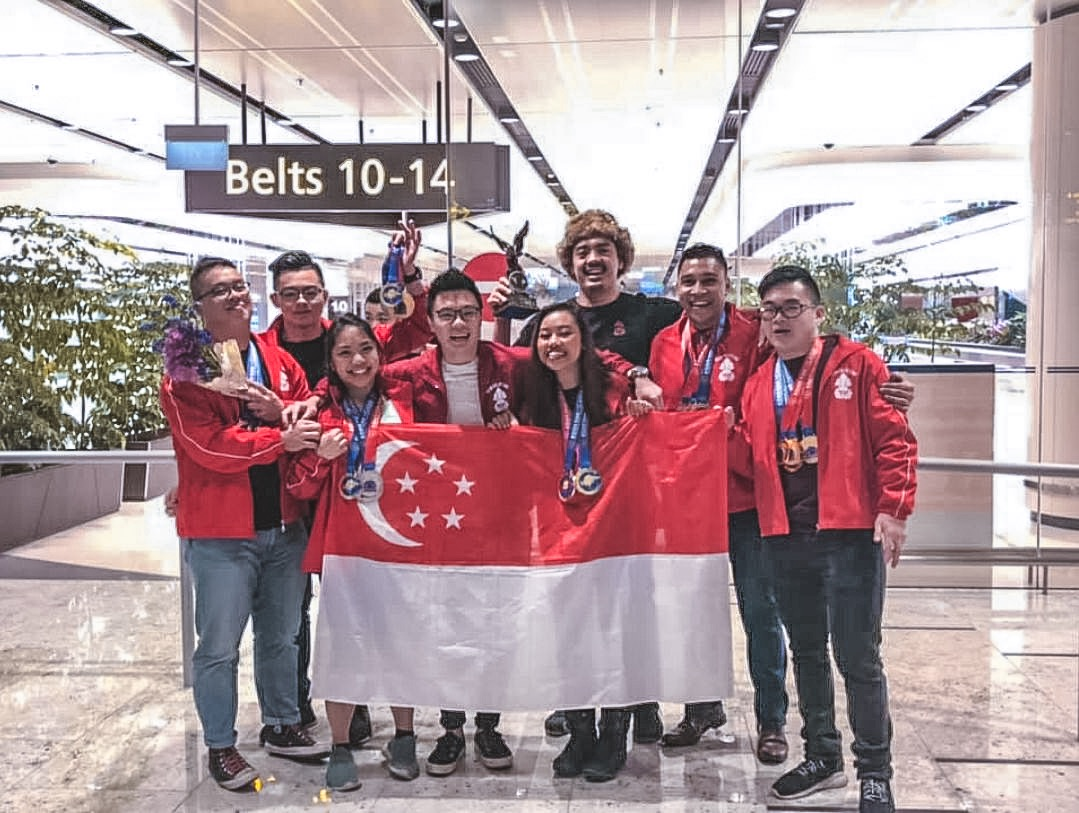
Team CoachbyMARC, after the Asian Championships. (Dec 2018)

Since breaking several World records, Yap has found his passion in coaching. He is coaching at CoachbyMARC, an Online Coaching platform for Powerlifting and strength athletes.

Yap runs CoachbyMARC alongside his business partner, Yeong Qing Quan who is an Asian Squat gold medalist. Both coach a range of athletes from newbies to national champions preparing to represent Singapore in international competitions.

Yap coached a team of athletes in the 2019 Asian Classic Championships held in Almaty, Kazakhstan:

Shirley Chu - Asian Champion

Cindy Witono - Asian Silver Medallist

Brandon Er - Asian Bench Press Silver Medallist

Park Min Ho (KOR)

== Media appearances ==
Yap has been featured considerably on local media outlets in Singapore such as Channel News Asia, The Straits Times, Today Online, Mothership.sg, etc.

His world record attempt at the World Classic Championships had also gone viral and garnered over 800,000 views on Facebook and was also invited for media interviews in local media outlets.
