= Matthew Ryan =

Matthew Ryan may refer to:

== Arts and entertainment ==
- Matthew Ryan (musician) (born 1971), American musician
- Matthew Ryan (writer), Australian playwright, theatre director and screenwriter
- Matt Ryan (actor) (born 1981), Welsh actor
- Matt Ryan, character from the Australian TV series City Homicide
- Matthew Abraham Ryan (Abram Joseph Ryan), American Catholic poet, priest, journalist, orator

== Politics ==
- Matthew Ryan (politician) (1810–1888), Stipendiary Magistrate on the 1st Council of the Northwest Territories
- Matthew J. Ryan (1932–2003), U.S. politician from Pennsylvania

== Sports ==
=== Rugby league ===
- Matthew Ryan (rugby league) (born 1969), Australian rugby league footballer
- Mat Ryan (rugby league) (1913–1994), Australian rugby league player
- Matt Ryan (rugby league) (born 1988), Australian rugby league footballer

=== Other sports ===
- Matthew Ryan (equestrian) (born 1964), Australian equestrian
- Matthew Ryan (handballer) (born 1966), Olympic handball captain
- Matthew Ryan (Australian rules footballer) (born 1967)
- Matt Ryan (ice hockey) (born 1983), Canadian ice hockey player
- Matt Ryan (rower) (born 1984), Australian rower
- Matt Ryan (American football) (born 1985), American football player and executive
- Mathew Ryan (born 1992), Australian soccer goalkeeper
- Matt Ryan (basketball) (born 1997), American basketball player
- Matt Ryan (rugby union) (born 1967), Australian rugby union player
