= Mathias =

Mathias, a given name and a surname which is a variant of Matthew (name), may refer to:

== People with the given name or surname Mathias ==
=== In music ===
- Mathias Eick, Norwegian Jazz Musician
- Mathias Färm, the guitarist of Millencolin
- Mathias Lillmåns, Finnish lead singer of folk/black metal band Finntroll
- William Mathias, Welsh composer
- Mathias Nygård a.k.a. Warlord, Finnish folk metal singer

=== In sports ===
- Mathias Bourgue, French tennis player
- Mathias Déguénon, Beninese football manager
- Mathias Dyngeland (born 1995), Norwegian footballer
- Mathias Fischer (basketball), German basketball coach
- Mathias Fullerton (born 2003), Danish archer
- Mathias Hove Johansen (born 1998), Norwegian sprinter
- Mathias Jensen (born 1996), Danish footballer
- Mathias Jørgensen, nicknamed Zanka, Danish football player
- Mathias Kiwanuka, American football player
- Mathias Kvistgaarden (born 2002), Danish footballer
- Mathias Normann (born 1996), Norwegian footballer
- Mathias Olsson (born 1973), Swedish former professional ice hockey defenceman
- Mathias Pogba (born 1990), Guinean professional footballer
- Mathias Svensson, Swedish professional footballer
- Mathias Vazquez (born 2008), Brazilian basketball player
- Bob Mathias, American decathlete, two-time Olympic gold medalist, and United States Congressman
- David Mathias, Indian cricketer
- Diego Mathias (born 1999), Brazilian footballer
- Mark Mathias (born 1994), American baseball player
- Merritt Mathias, American soccer player
- Van Mathias (born 2000), American swimmer
- Wallis Mathias, first non-Muslim cricketer to play for Pakistan

=== In other fields ===
- Mathias Énard born (1972), French novelist
- Mathias Gnädinger (1941–2015), Swiss actor
- Mathias Lauridsen (born 1984), Danish male model
- Mathias Lerch (1860–1922), Czech mathematician
- Mathias Loras (1792–1858), French Catholic Bishop of Dubuque and college president
- Mathias Rust (born 1968), German amateur aviator
- Mathias Tegnér (born 1979), Swedish politician
- Charles Mathias (1922–2010), United States senator
- Clarence Edward Mathias (1876–1935), American Medal of Honor recipient
- Gary Mathias (born 1952), American missing person since 1978
- James Goronwy Mathias (1842–1895, Welsh minister and writer
- Ronald Mathias (1912–1968), Welsh Trade Union Leader
- Tania Mathias (born 1964), British Conservative Party politician
- Thomas James Mathias (c. 1754–1835), British satirist
- A. Mathias Mundadan (1923–2012), Indian historian

== See also ==
- Matias
- Matthew (disambiguation)
- Matthias
- Mattias
- Mattathias
