= Mattias =

- Pronunciation: /ˈmɑtːiɑs/
- Gender: Male

Origin
- Region of origin: Denmark, Estonia, Finland, Norway, Sweden

Other names
- Related names: Matthew, Matthias

Mattias is a masculine given name found most prominently in Northern Europe. It is a cognate of Matthew and Matthias, and may refer to:

== Sports ==
- Mattias Adelstam (born 1982), Swedish footballer
- Mattias Ardin (born 1969), Swedish officer
- Mattias Asper (born 1974), Swedish goalkeeper
- Mattias Bäckman (born 1992), Swedish ice hockey defenceman
- Mattias Beck (born 1983), Swedish ice hockey player
- Mattias Bjärsmyr (born 1986), Swedish footballer
- Mattias Blomberg (born 1976), Swedish snowboarder
- Mattias Borg (born 1991), Swedish badminton player
- Mattias Carlsson (born 1980), Swedish ice hockey winger
- Mattias Claesson (born 1986), Swedish middle-distance runner
- Mattias Ekholm (born 1990), Swedish ice hockey defenceman
- Mattias Ekström (born 1978), Swedish racing driver
- Mattias Elfström (born 1997), Swedish ice hockey player
- Mattias Eliasson (born 1975), Swedish professional golfer
- Mattias Eriksson (born 1981), Swedish archer
- Mattias Falck (born 1991), Swedish table tennis player
- Mattias Gestranius (born 1978), Finnish football referee
- Mattias Granlund (born 1992), Swedish ice hockey player
- Mattias Gustafsson (born 1978), Swedish handball player
- Mattias Guter (born 1988), Swedish ice hockey player
- Mattias Håkansson (born 1993), Swedish footballer
- Mattias Thunman Hälldahl (born 1993), Swedish ice hockey defenceman
- Mattias Hargin (born 1985), Swedish alpine ski racer
- Mattias Hubrich (born 1966), New Zealand alpine skier
- Mattias Hugosson (born 1974), Swedish footballer
- Mattias Janmark-Nylén (born 1992), Swedish ice hockey center
- Mattias Johansson (born 1992), Swedish footballer
- Mattias Jons (born 1982), Swedish hammer thrower
- Mattias Jonson (born 1974), Swedish former football player
- Mattias Käit (born 1998), Estonian footballer
- Mattias Mete (born 1987), Swedish footballer
- Mattias Modig (born 1987), Swedish ice hockey goaltender
- Mattias Moström (born 1983), Swedish footballer
- Mattias Neuenschwander (born 1953), Swiss curler
- Mattias Nilsson (born 1982), Swedish biathlete
- Mattias Nilsson (ice hockey) (born 1994), Swedish ice hockey defenceman
- Mattias Nørstebø (born 1995), Norwegian ice hockey defenceman
- Mattias Norström (born 1972), Swedish ice hockey player
- Mattias Nylund (born 1980), Swedish soccer player
- Mattias Ohlin (born 1978), Swedish freestyle swimmer
- Mattias Öhlund (born 1976), Swedish ice hockey defenceman
- Mattias Oscarsson (born 1975), Swedish canoeist
- Mattias Östberg (born 1977), Swedish footballer
- Mattias Persson (born 1985), Swedish ice hockey player
- Mattias Rahm (born 1973), Swedish sailor
- Mattias Remstam (born 1975), Swedish ice hockey player
- Mattias Ritola (born 1987), Swedish ice hockey player
- Mattias Rydberg (born 1985), Swedish bandy player
- Mattias Saari (born 1994), Swedish ice hockey player
- Mattias Samuelsson (born 2000), American ice hockey defenseman
- Mattias Schnorf (born 1984), Swiss footballer
- Mattias Schoberg (born 1973), Swedish wrestler
- Mattias Sereinig (born 1984), Austrian midfielder
- Mattias Siimar (born 1998), Estonian tennis player
- Mattias Sjögren (born 1987), Swedish ice hockey centre
- Mattias Skjelmose (born 2000), Danish cyclist
- Mattias Sunneborn (born 1970), Swedish Olympic athlete
- Mattias Svanberg (born 1999), Swedish footballer
- Mattias Tedenby (born 1990), Swedish ice hockey player
- Mattias Thylander (born 1974), Swedish former football player
- Mattias Tichy (born 1974), Swedish rower
- Mattias Timander (born 1974), Swedish ice hockey player
- Mattias Vegnaduzzo (born 1983), Argentine footballer
- Mattias Weinhandl (born 1980), Swedish ice hockey player
- Mattias Wennerberg (born 1981), Swedish ice hockey player
- Mattias Wigardt (born 1986), Swedish badminton player
- Mattias Wiklöf (born 1979), Swedish footballer
- Mattias Zachrisson (born 1990), Swedish handball player

== Other fields ==
- Mattias Agabus (born 1977), Estonian architect
- Mattias Alkberg (born 1969), Swedish poet
- Mattias Andréasson (born 1981), Swedish singer
- Mattias Bärjed (born 1973), Swedish musician
- Mattias Eklundh (born 1969), Swedish guitarist
- Mattias Flink (born 1970), Swedish mass murderer
- Mattias Gardell (born 1959), Swedish historian of religion
- Mattias Härenstam (born 1971), Swedish artist
- Mattias Hellberg (born 1973), Swedish musician
- Mattias Bäckström Johansson (born 1985), Swedish politician
- Mattias Jonsson (born 1974), Swedish politician
- Mattias Jorstedt, Swedish Magic: The Gathering player
- Mattias Klum (born 1968), Swedish freelance photographer
- Mattias Kumm (born 1967), German professor
- Mattias Lindblom (born 1971), Swedish singer
- Mattias Mainiero (born 1955), Italian journalist
- Mattias Marklund (born 1974), Swedish guitarist
- Mattias de' Medici (1613–1667), Italian governor
- Mattias Morheden (born 1970), Swedish film editor
- Mattias Olsson (born 1975), Chinese record producer
- Mattias Schulstad (born 1984), Swedish guitarist
- Mattias Ståhl (born 1971), Swedish composer
- Mattias Svensson (born 1972), Swedish writer
- Mattias Tesfaye (born 1981), Danish politician
- Mattias Therman (born 1974), Finnish businessman

== See also ==
- Matthias
- Mathias (disambiguation)
- Matias
