= Matias =

Matías is the Portuguese and Spanish version of Matthias. Matías is very popular in Latin America especially in Argentina. In German-speaking Europe it is most often written as Matthias. It appears in this form in Norway, Sweden, Denmark and Finland. Alternate spellings are: Mathias, Mattias, Mattis, Mats and Matti. Matias was the same day by the Finnish-Swedish name day calendar until 1989, when it was replaced by Mattias forms and Mats. In Finland, by the end of 2009 the name has been given to about 73,160 people. In the form of Mattias to 3,683 people, in the form of Matthias to little more than 440, and in the form of Mathias a little less than 3,000.

The name Matias is of Hebrew origin, derived from the ancient Hebrew name Mattitjah (Hebrew: מתיתיהו) which means gift of God.

== Given name ==
- Matias Aguayo (born 1973), German-Chilean record producer
- Matias Aires (1705-1763), Portuguese philosopher
- Matias Albarracin (born 1979), Argentine Olympic athlete
- Matias de Arteaga (1633-1704), Spanish painter
- Matias Brain (born 1974), Chilean Olympic athlete
- Matias del Campo, Chilean-Austrian architect
- Matias Caseras (born 1992), Uruguayan football player
- Matias Gabriel Ceballos (born 1984), Argentinean footballer
- Matias Collins (born 1970), American sailor
- Matias Concha (born 1980), Swedish footballer
- Matias Damásio (born 1982), Angolan musician
- Matias Defensor Jr. (born 1943), Filipino politician
- Matias Faldbakken (born 1973), Norwegian artist
- Matias Ferreira (born 1997), Portuguese footballer
- Matias Haaranen (born 1996), Finnish ice hockey defenceman
- Matias Habtemichael (born 1950), Ethiopian middle-distance runner
- Matias Hänninen (born 1991), Finnish footballer
- Matias Koski (born 1994), Finnish swimmer
- Matias Köykkä (born 1994), Finnish racing driver
- Matias Kupiainen (born 1983), Finnish guitarist
- Matias Laine (born 1990), Finnish racing driver
- Matias Lassen (born 1996), Danish ice hockey defenceman
- Matias Loppi (born 1980), Finnish ice hockey forward
- Matias Mäkynen (born 1990), Finnish politician
- Matias Malmberg (born 2000), Danish track cyclist
- Matias Maccelli (born 2000), Finnish ice hockey forward
- Matias Mantilla (born 1981), Argentine footballer
- Matias Marttinen (born 1990), Finnish politician
- Matias Masucci, Italian writer
- Matias Montinho (born 1990), Angolan sailor
- Matias Møvik (born 1991), Norwegian footballer
- Matias Myttynen (born 1990), Finnish ice hockey forward
- Matias Niuta (born 2001), Finnish footballer
- Matias Ojala (born 1995), Finnish footballer
- Matias Paterlini (born 1977), Argentine cricketer
- Matias Pavoni (born 1980), Argentinean footballer
- Matias Pulli (born 1995), Finnish ice hockey defenceman
- Matias Putkonen (1822–1868), Finnish Lutheran priest
- Matias Ranillo Sr. (1898-1947), Filipino legislator
- Matias Rueda (born 1988), Argentine boxer
- Matias Shikondomboro, Namibian Lutheran pastor
- Matias Skard (1846-1927), Norwegian translator
- Matias Sointu (born 1990), Finnish ice hockey forward
- Matias Spektor (born 1977), Argentine author
- Matias Strandvall (born 1985), Finnish cross country skier
- Matias Tellez (born 1989), Norwegian singer-songwriter
- Matias Tuomi (born 1985), Finnish squash player
- Matias Varela (born 1980), Swedish actor
- Matias Viazzo (born 1983), Argentine rugby union player
- Matias Zaldarriaga (born 1971), Argentinean cosmologist
- Kimi-Matias Räikkönen (born 1979), Finnish Formula One driver

== Surname ==
- Aura Matias, Filipino engineer
- Manuel Matias (born 1962), Portuguese long-distance runner
- Manuel Matias (born 1964), Portuguese footballer

== See also ==
- Mathias (disambiguation)
- Matthias
- Mattias
