= Matías =

Matías is the Spanish version of Matthias. In Nordic languages (Norwegian, Swedish Danish and Finnish) and in Portuguese it is unaccented as Matias.

Notable people with the name include:

== Given name ==
- Matías Alemanno, Argentine rugby player
- Matías Almeyda, Argentine footballer
- Matías Cahais, Argentine footballer
- Matías Emilio Delgado, Argentine footballer
- Matías Duarte, Chilean computer engineer
- Matías Draghi, Argentine footballer
- Matías Escobar, Argentine footballer
- Matías Fernández (footballer, born 1986), Chilean footballer
- Matías Freyre (born 1994), Argentinian rugby union player
- Matías Funes, Honduran academic and politician
- Matías Grande, Mexican archer
- Matías Moroni, Argentine rugby player
- Matías Noble, Argentine footballer
- Matías Orlando, Argentine rugby player
- Matías Paredes, Argentine hockey player
- Matías Pavoni, Argentine footballer
- Matías Prats Cañete, Spanish journalist and commentator
- Matías Prats Luque, Spanish journalist and anchorman, son of Matías Prats Cañete
- Matías Rodríguez, Argentine footballer
- Matías Romero, Mexican politician
- Matías Ruiz (fl. 1665–1702), Spanish baroque music composer
- Matías Sarraute (born 1990), Argentine footballer
- Matías Soler (born 1995), Argentine footballer
- Matías Soulé (born 2003), Argentine footballer
- Matías Vargas (footballer, born 1996), Argentine footballer
- Matías Vargas (footballer, born 1997), Argentine footballer
- Matías Vecino (born 1991), Uruguayan footballer
- Matías Vega (born 1986), Argentine footballer
- Matías Vila (born 1979), Argentine field hockey player
- Matías Villarreal (born 1992), Argentine footballer
- Matías Viña (born 1997), Uruguayan footballer
- Matías Vitkieviez (born 1985), Uruguayan-Swiss footballer
- Matías Vuoso (born 1981), Argentine-Mexican footballer
- Matías Walker (born 1973), Chilean politician
- Matías Zagazeta (born 2003), Peruvian racing driver
- Matías Zaldívar (born 1995), Argentine footballer
- Matías Zaldivia (born 1991), Argentine-Chilean footballer
- Matías Zaracho (born 1998), Argentine footballer

== Surname ==
- Alexis Matías (born 1974), Puerto Rican volleyball player
- Angel Matías (born 1976), Puerto Rican volleyball player
- Santiago Matías (born 1981), Dominican radio personality and producer
- Subriel Matías (born 1992), Puerto Rican boxer
