= Matthias =

Matthias is a name derived from the Greek Ματθαίος, in origin similar to Matthew.

== Notable people ==
Notable people named Matthias include the following:

=== Religion ===
- Saint Matthias, chosen as an apostle in Acts 1:21–26 to replace Judas Iscariot
- Matthias of Trakai (c. 1370–1453), Lithuanian clergyman, bishop of Samogitia and of Vilnius
- Matthias Flacius, Lutheran reformer
- Matthias the Prophet, see Robert Matthews (religious impostor) Claimed to be the reincarnation of the original Matthias during the Second Great Awakening
- Matthias F. Cowley, Latter-day Saint apostle

=== Arts ===
- Matthias Bamert (born 1942), Swiss composer
- Matthias Barr (1831–1911), Scottish poet
- Matthias Grünewald, highly regarded painter from the German Renaissance
- Matthias Hartmann (born 1963), German theatre director
- Matthias Jabs, German guitarist and songwriter
- Matthías Jochumsson, Icelandic poet
- Matthias Lechner, German film art director
- Matthias Menck, German audio engineer, electronic music producer and DJ
- Matthias Moosdorf, German cellist and politician
- Matthias Paul (actor), German actor
- Matthias Paul (DJ), German Electronic Dance Music DJ, musician and producer known by his stage name Paul van Dyk
- Matthias Pfenninger, Swiss artist
- Matthias Schoenaerts, Belgian actor
- Matthias Weckmann, North German musician and composer of the Baroque period
- Matthias David Matthiasson, Icelandic singer who performed at the Eurovision

=== Nobility and politicians ===
- Matthias, Holy Roman Emperor, Emperor of the Holy Roman Empire (Habsburg dynasty)
- Matthias Attwood (1779–1851), British politician
- Matthias Bartke (born 1959), German politician
- Matthias Berger (born 1968), German politician
- Matthias Birkwald (born 1961), German politician
- Matthias Corvinus of Hungary, King of Hungary
- Matthias Eggers (born 1985), German politician
- Matthias Erzberger (1875–1921), German politician
- Matthias Fekl (born 1977), French politician
- Matthias Lieschke (born 1970), German politician
- Matthias Platzeck (born 1953), German politician
- Matthias Rentzsch (born 1977), German politician
- Matthias Reuber (born 1992), German politician

=== Sportspeople ===
- Matthias Almer (born 1994), Austrian badminton player
- Matthias Arnold (born 1997), Austrian footballer
- Matthias Askew (born 1982), American footballer
- Matthias Bachinger (born 1987), German tennis player
- Matthias Bader (born 1997), German footballer
- Matthias Baranowski (born 1967), German footballer
- Matthias Baumann (born 1963), Olympic athlete
- Matthias Bieber (born 1986), Swiss ice hockey player
- Matthias Biedermann (born 1983), German skeleton racer
- Matthias Billen (1910–1989), German footballer
- Matthias Blübaum (born 1997), German chess grandmaster
- Matthias Ginter, German footballer
- Matthias Goossen, Canadian footballer
- Matthias Pfleiderer (born 1995), German gymnast
- Matthias Sammer, German football player and manager
- Matthias Schuldt (born 2000), German gymnast
- Matthias Steiner, German Weightlifter

=== Other ===
- Matthias Abele (1618–1677), jurist
- Matthias Adamczewski (born 1958), German sailor
- Matthias Ahrens (born 1961), German mountain guide
- Matthias Albinus (fl. 1570s), Polish Calvinist minister
- F. Matthias Alexander, Australian actor who developed the educational process that is today called the Alexander Technique
- Matthias Alleyn (died 1642), 17th-century London gentleman and College Master
- Matthias Aschenbrenner (born 1972), American mathematician
- Matthias Aulike (1807-1865), civil servant
- Matthias Bartgis (1759-1825), German-American business person
- Matthias Ettrich, German computer scientist and founder of KDE and LyX
- Matthias Felleisen, programming languages researcher
- Matthias Frings, German writer and journalist
- Matthias Kreck, German mathematician
- Matthias Jakob Schleiden, German botanist and co-founder of the cell theory

=== Fictional characters ===
- Matthias, central figure in Brian Jacques's Redwall series
- Matthias Helvar, character in Leigh Bardugo's Six of Crows and Shadow and Bone played by Calohan Skogman
- Matthias, the middle nurse father from canto 9 in the game Limbus Company by Project moon.

== Cognates ==
The following forenames are related to the English forename Matthias:

- Afrikaans: Matthys
- Amharic: ማትያስ (Mathias)
- Assyrian: ܡܲܬܿܝܵܐ (Mattiya)
- Belarusian: Мацей (Maciej)
- Catalan: Mateu
- Croatian: Matija, Matej, Mate
- Czech: Matyáš, Matěj
- Danish: Mattias, Matthias, Matias, Mads
- Dutch: Matthias, Mathijs, Matthijs
- English: Matthias
- Estonian: Mattias
- Finnish: Matias, Matti
- French: Mathias, Matthias, Matthis
- Gaelic: Maitias
- Georgian: Mate (მათე)
- German: Mathias, Matthias
- Hungarian: Mátyás
- Icelandic: Matthías
- Indonesian: Matthias, Matias
- Italian: Mattia
- Japanese: マティアス (Matiasu)
- Korean: 마티아스 (Matiaseu)
- Latin: Matthias
- Latvian: Matiass, Matejs, Matīss
- Lithuanian: Motiejus
- Norwegian: Mattias, Matthias, Mats
- Polish: Maciej
- Portuguese: Matias (current spelling), Mathias (archaic spelling)
- Romanian: Matia
- Russian: Матфий (do not confuse with Матфей (Матвей))
- Serbian: Матија
- Slovak: Matej
- Slovenian: Matija, Matej, Matjaž
- Spanish: Matías
- Swedish: Mattias, Mathias, Mattis, Mats
- Turkish: Mattias, Mattiya
- Welsh: Mathew, Matheus

== See also ==
- Justice Matthias (disambiguation)
- Mathias (disambiguation)
- Matias
- Mattathias
- Mattias
- Matthias Church in Budapest
