= Putkonen =

Putkonen is a Finnish surname. Notable people with the surname include:

- Luke Putkonen (born 1986), American baseball player
- Matias Putkonen (1822–1868), Finnish Lutheran priest and politician
- Tahvo Putkonen (1795–1825), Finnish murderer
