= 2018–19 Coupe de France preliminary rounds, Hauts-de France =

The 2018–19 Coupe de France preliminary rounds, Hauts-de France was the qualifying competition to decide which teams from the leagues of the Hauts-de France region of France took part in the main competition from the seventh round.

== Preliminary round ==
These matches are from the Aisne district only, and were played on 19 August 2018.

Preliminary round results: Hauts-de-France (Aisne)
Tie no	Home team (tier)	Score	Away team (tier)
1.	AS Pernant (13)	1–2	ACSF Vic-sur-Aisne (11)
2.	Liesse-Marais (13)	0–3 (Note: Tie won by forfeit.)	ES Clacy-Mons (12)
3.	FC Essigny-le-Grand (12)	3–1 (a.e.t.) (Note: Tie switched at the request of both clubs.)	SC Flavy-le-Martel (11)

These matches are from the Artois district only, and were played on 19 August 2018.

Preliminary round results: Hauts-de-France (Artois)
Tie no	Home team (tier)	Score	Away team (tier)
1.	AS Barlin (11)	3–0	US Croisilles (10)
2.	JF Mazingarbe (12)	2–1	ES Vendin (11)
3.	ES Douvrin (14)	4–3	US Houdain (12)

This match is from the Flandres district only, and was played on 26 August 2018.

Preliminary round results: Hauts-de-France (Flandres)
Tie no	Home team (tier)	Score	Away team (tier)
1.	FC Steene (10)	1–4	US Warhem (9)

== Second round ==
These matches are from the Somme district only, and were played on 17, 23 and 24 June 2018. Tiers shown reflect the 2017–18 season.

First round results: Hauts-de-France (Somme)
Tie no	Home team (tier)	Score	Away team (tier)
1.	FC Vignacourt (13)	1–6	Conty Lœuilly SC (8)
2.	AJ Argœuves (12)	0–3 (Note: AJ Argœuves penalised for fielding a suspended player. Olympique St Ouen qualify. Original scoreline 4–3.)	Olympique St Ouen (12)
3.	US Bouillancourt-en-Sery (12)	1–5	FC Oisemont (11)
4.	SEP Blangy-Bouttencourt (10)	2–4	ES Chépy (10)
5.	Avenir de l'Étoile (14)	0–1	Olympique Amiénois (11)
6.	JS Cambron (11)	3–2	Auxiloise (9)
7.	AS Hautvillers-Ouville (13)	0–6	AS Airaines-Allery (9)
8.	AS Long (15)	0–8	SC Flixecourt (10)
9.	AC Mers (12)	1–6	FC Centuloise (8)
10.	AS Talmas Picardie Fienvillers (11)	3–4	AS St Sauveur 80 (9)
11.	ASC Bourdon (13)	6–0 (Note: Match abandoned after 20 minutes, due to ASC Bourdon being reduced to fewer than 8 players. ABC2F Candas qualify.)	ABC2F Candas (12)
12.	Amiens Picardie FC (13)	3–0 (Note: Tie won by forfeit.)	AAE Feuquières-en-Vimeu (12)
13.	AS Maisnières (13)	3–4	Amiens RIF (10)
14.	SC Bernaville-Prouville (13)	1–2	Poix-Blangy-Croixrault FC (11)
15.	CS Crécy-en-Ponthieu (11)	4–6	AC Hallencourt (11)
16.	CO Woignarue (12)	2–5	US Lignières-Châtelain (11)
17.	Olympique Eaucourtois (11)	1–0	SC Templiers Oisemont (10)
18.	US Flesselles (11)	2–1	ES Harondel (9)
19.	Entente Sailly-Flibeaucourt Le Titre (12)	1–2	FC Mareuil-Caubert (10)
20.	US Nibas Fressenneville (10)	1–3	CS Amiens Montières Étouvie (8)
21.	US Quend (12)	8–3	ASIC Bouttencourt (11)
22.	AS Woincourt Dargnies (13)	1–6	JS Miannay Lambercourt (9)
23.	Avenir Nouvion-en-Ponthieu (11)	1–2	US Abbeville (9)
24.	SSEP Martainneville (14)	1–3	AS Quesnoy-le-Montant (11)
25.	ASF Hombleux (14)	1–2	ES Cagny (11)
26.	ES Roye-Damery (11)	1–2	US Corbie (10)
27.	Amiens FC (13)	2–3	AS Villers-Bretonneux (8)
28.	ES Vers-sur-Selle (14)	2–1	US Sailly-Saillisel (10)
29.	AF Amiens (15)	3–1	FC Estrées-Mons (12)
30.	AS Davenescourt (12)	1–2	ES Pigeonnier Amiens (9)
31.	US Cartigny-Buire (13)	0–3	Olympique Le Hamel (10)
32.	USC Moislains (13)	1–7	US Marchélepot (11)
33.	FC Blangy-Tronville (12)	4–3	Fraternelle Ailly-sur-Noye (12)
34.	US Hangest-en-Santerre (12)	2–4	US Roisel (11)
35.	ES Sains/St Fuscien (10)	1–3	US Ouvriere Albert (9)
36.	AS Glisy (12)	0–0 (1–3 p)	SC Moreuil (10)
37.	US Béthencourt-sur-Mer (11)	3–2	ES Deux Vallées (10)
38.	ASFR Ribemont Mericourt (12)	3–3 (3–5 p)	US Daours Vecquemont Bussy Aubigny (11)
39.	ASM Rivery (14)	1–2	AS Querrieu (10)
40.	US Ham (11)	1–1 (2–3 p)	Entente CAFC Péronne (8)
41.	RC Salouël (9)	2–4	FC La Montoye (9)
42.	AS Cerisy (11)	1–1 (4– p)	ES Ste Emilie/Épehy le Ronss (11)
43.	FC Saleux (8)	5–6 (a.e.t.)	JS Quevauvillers (8)
44.	AS Prouzel-Plachy (14)	1–3	FC Plessier (14)
45.	FR Englebelmer (11)	0–3	FC Méaulte (10)
46.	US Marcelcave (14)	0–1	US Méricourt l'Abbé (13)
47.	US Esmery-Hallon (14)	3–0	ES Licourt (13)
48.	FC Arvillers (13)	1–4	US Rosières (9)
49.	FC Ailly-Vauchelles (12)	0–9	FC St Valéry Baie de Somme Sud (10)
50.	AS Vismes-au-Val (12)	2–3	AS Valines (10)

These matches are from the Aisne district only, and were played on 26 August 2018.

First round results: Hauts-de-France (Aisne)
Tie no	Home team (tier)	Score	Away team (tier)
1.	US Étreaupont (13)	1–4	US Guise (9)
2.	ACSF Vic-sur-Aisne (11)	0–4	FC Amigny-Rouy (9)
3.	ASC St Michel (11)	1–3	ES Montcornet (9)
4.	FC St Martin-Étreillers (11)	0–0 (1–3 p)	FC Monceau-lès-Leups (10)
5.	AS Faverolles-Dampleux-Fleury (13)	2–0	ASA Mont Notre-Dame (11)
6.	US Brissy-Hamégicourt (12)	1–3	US Crépy Vivaise (10)
7.	FC Vaux-Andigny (13)	0–3 (Note: Tie won by forfeit.)	FC Fonsomme (10)
8.	ASPTT Laon (12)	0–1	US Prémontré St Gobain (9)
9.	CS Montescourt-Lizerolles (13)	1–2	UES Vermand (11)
10.	AS Milonaise (12)	0–2	Union Sud Aisne FC (8)
11.	FC Fontainois (12)	0–10	Le Nouvion AC (8)
12.	AS Martigny (12)	2–1	US Rozoy-sur-Serre (10)
13.	CS Aubenton (12)	1–3	US Vervins (10)
14.	ES Clacy-Mons (12)	3–0	ES Viry-Noureuil (12)
15.	Étaves-et-Bocquiaux FC (13)	0–11	Stade Portugais St Quentin (9)
16.	AC Gricourt (12)	0–3 (a.e.t.)	US Seboncourt (11)
17.	Ferté Chevresis FC (12)	2–4	SAS Moy de l'Aisne (8)
18.	FC Billy-sur-Aisne (10)	3–1	IEC Château-Thierry (10)
19.	FC Travecy (14)	0–4	FC Lehaucourt (12)
20.	FC Watigny (11)	1–3	SC Origny-en-Thiérache (10)
21.	US Origny-Thenelles (12)	1–4	Harly Quentin (8)
22.	US Sissonne (10)	1–4	US Buire-Hirson-Thiérache (8)
23.	Entente Crouy-Cuffies (11)	0–2	FC Villers Cotterêts (9)
24.	FC Lesdins (12)	1–4	Gauchy-Grugies St Quentin FC (8)
25.	La Concorde de Bucy-les-Pierrepont (11)	1–2	US Aulnois-sous-Laon (11)
26.	US Vallée de l'Ailette (11)	0–5	CS Villeneuve St Germain (9)
27.	CS Blérancourt (12)	0–3	US Venizel (9)
28.	AS Gandelu (13)	0–3	Septmonts OC (10)
29.	AS Audigny (13)	3–2	NES Boué-Étreux (11)
30.	US des Vallées (11)	0–5	UA Fère-en-Tardenois (10)
31.	ESUS Buironfosse-La Capelle (11)	3–0 (Note: Tie switched at the request of both clubs.)	ES Bucilly-Landouzy-Éparcy (12)
32.	FJEP Coincy (11)	2–2 (3–1 p)	AS Neuilly-St Front (10)
33.	Fraternelle des Cheminots de Laon (12)	2–0	FFC Chéry-lès-Pouilly (10)
34.	FC Hannapes (13)	2–4	AS Beaurevoir (10)
35.	ES Sequehart-Fonsomme-Levergies (13)	0–1	US Vadencourt (12)
36.	Marle Sports (12)	2–0 (a.e.t.)	TFC Neuve-Maison (10)
37.	FC 3 Châteaux (10)	1–3 (a.e.t.)	US Bruyères-et-Montbérault (9)
38.	BCV FC (10)	3–0	FC Vierzy (11)
39.	FC Essigny-le-Grand (12)	1–3	ES Ognes (11)
40.	US Athies-sous-Laon (10)	2–0	AS Barenton-Bugny (13)
41.	US La Fère (11)	1–0	US Anizy-Pinon (12)
42.	Espoir Sains-Richaumont (11)	1–2	AFC Holnon-Fayet (9)

These matches are from the Côte d'Opale district only, and were played on 26 August 2018.

First round results: Hauts-de-France (Côte d'Opale)
Tie no	Home team (tier)	Score	Away team (tier)
1.	Le Portel GPF (13)	0–5	CAP Le Portel (10)
2.	RC Samer (12)	0–1	JS Condette (10)
3.	AS Campagne-lès-Hesdin (10)	1–3	US Créquy-Planquette (11)
4.	AS Calais (13)	1–0	US Hardinghen (12)
5.	USM Boulogne-sur-Mer (13)	4–2 (a.e.t.)	AEP St Inglevert (14)
6.	FC Wissant (13)	1–3	FC Calais Catena (11)
7.	FC Isques (12)	4–3	ESL Boulogne-sur-Mer (9)
8.	FC Setques (14)	2–3	ES Roquetoire (11)
9.	SO Calais (12)	0–2	ES Calaisis Coulogne (8)
10.	Amicale Balzac (11)	0–6	SC Coquelles (8)
11.	ES St Omer Rural (10)	2–3	ES Arques (8)
12.	AS Colembert (12)	1–5	ES Licques (10)
13.	RC Brêmes-les-Ardres (14)	1–7	ES Guînes (9)
14.	US Coyecques (14)	1–5	AS Fruges (11)
15.	Caffiers FC (15)	0–7	AS Surques-Escœuilles (12)
16.	FJEP Fort Vert (10)	3–1	US Blériot-Plage (8)
17.	Recques FC (9)	2–0	FC Campagne-lès-Guines (9)
18.	AS St Tricat et Nielles (12)	2–3	US Élinghen-Ferques (13)
19.	AF Étaples Haute Ville (9)	3–2	US Équihen-Plage (10)
20.	JS Bonningues-lès-Ardres (13)	0–11	AS Nortkerque 95 (8)
21.	US Porteloise (10)	4–1	AS Crémarest (11)
22.	Quartier Genty Berck (13)	0–2	AL Camiers (9)
23.	FR Preures-Zoteux (13)	1–7	FLC Longfossé (10)
24.	ES Enquin-les-Mines (9)	3–0	FC Wavrans-sur-l'Aa (10)
25.	US Hesdin-l'Abbé (11)	0–6	Éclair Neufchâtel-Hardelot (10)
26.	Calais FCHF (11)	2–1	USO Rinxent (10)
27.	FC Fréthun (12)	3–4	US Ambleteuse (10)
28.	CS Watten (11)	1–1 (2–4 p)	FCP Blendecques (11)
29.	FC Conti (15)	1–6	Olympique St Martin Boulogne (9)
30.	US Bonningues-lès-Calais (13)	0–7	RC Ardrésien (10)
31.	AS Rang-du-Fliers (11)	3–3 (4–3 p)	Verton FC (10)
32.	US Marais de Gûines (11)	2–4 (a.e.t.)	ES Oye-Plage (8)
33.	US Dannes (10)	6–3	FC Merlimont (11)
34.	Calais Beau-Marais (9)	11–0	FC Calais Opale Bus (14)
35.	US Dohem-Avroult-Cléty (11)	0–4	FC Wardrecques (10)
36.	AS Portelois (15)	2–7	US Landrethun-le-Nord (10)
37.	US Vaudringhem (14)	1–3	US Verchocq-Ergny-Herly (12)
38.	FC Wizernes (13)	0–3	US Blaringhem (9)
39.	US Outreau (13)	0–9 (Note: Match abandoned after 72 minutes due to US Outreau having insufficient players to continue. JS Desvroise qualify.)	JS Desvroise (9)
40.	RC Lottinghen (14)	0–6	US Bourthes (10)
41.	US Thérouanne (13)	1–3	ES Herbelles-Pihem-Inghem (12)
42.	JS Créquoise Loison (12)	0–12	AS Bezinghem (10)
43.	Entente Calais (12)	2–3 (a.e.t.)	AS Audruicq (9)
44.	US Bomy (14)	1–2	ES Mametz (11)
45.	AS Balinghem (15)	0–10	US Marquise (10)
46.	FC Ecques-Heuringhem (12)	1–3 (a.e.t.)	CA Éperlecques (9)
47.	Union St Loupoise (12)	0–8	Olympique Hesdin-Marconne (9)
48.	US Quiestède (10)	2–0	US Alquines (11)
49.	ASL Vieil-Moutier La Calique (12)	0–3	US Nielles-lès-Bléquin (9)
50.	RC Bréquerecque Ostrohove (11)	1–3	AS Wimereux (9)
51.	US Rety (15)	1–4	FC La Capelle (11)
52.	US Frencq (11)	0–2	AS Cucq (9)
53.	ES Helfaut (11)	0–6	FC Tatinghem (8)
54.	AS Gazelec Boulogne (13)	1–3	FC Nordausques (9)
55.	Amicale Pont-de-Briques (12)	0–1	ES St Léonard (9)
56.	Gouy-St André RC (12)	2–4	ES Beaurainville (9)
57.	AS Berck (9)	0–1	US Montreuil (8)
58.	JS Renescuroise (12)	0–4	US St Quentin-Bléssy (9)
59.	JS Blangy-sur-Ternoise (13)	3–2	AS Fillièvres (11)
60.	AS Boisjean (12)	0–5	AS Conchil-le-Temple (10)
61.	FC Sangatte (10)	5–0	US Attaquoise (11)
62.	AS Esquerdes (13)	0–3	AS Tournehem (10)
63.	AC Tubersent (12)	0–9	US Attin (8)
64.	AS St Martin-au-Laërt (10)	0–1	CA Vieille-Église (11)

These matches are from the Flandres district only, and were played on 26 and 29 August and 2 September 2018.

First round results: Hauts-de-France (Flandres)
Tie no	Home team (tier)	Score	Away team (tier)
1.	US Provin (10)	2–4	JA Armentières (8)
2.	US Pérenchies (9)	1–2	RC Bergues (9)
3.	Stade Ennevelin (12)	0–5	AO Sainghinoise (9)
4.	FC Deûlémont (11)	1–3	ES Weppes (9)
5.	FC Emmerin (12)	3–0 (Note: Tie won by forfeit.)	ASC Roubaix (12)
6.	US Warhem (9)	5–0 (Note: Tie switched at the request of both clubs.)	CS Erquinghem-Lys (10)
7.	Stella Lys (8)	1–0	ES Ennequin-Loos (9)
8.	AJL Caëstre (11)	2–0	AG Thumeries (12)
9.	Bac-Sailly Sports (12)	3–0	US Ronchin (9)
10.	US Estaires (12)	1–4	Verlinghem Foot (10)
11.	JS Ghyveldoise (9)	0–2	Mons AC (8)
12.	EC Camphin-en-Pévèle (11)	0–4	AS Baisieux Patro (8)
13.	ES Mouvalloise (8)	3–1	US Esquelbecq (8)
14.	AS Bersée (10)	5–1 (a.e.t.)	Toufflers AF (11)
15.	FC Merris (12)	0–3	FC Annœullin (10)
16.	US Houplin-Ancoisne (11)	0–2	US St André (8)
17.	FC Templemars-Vendeville (11)	2–0	US Wervicquoise (12)
18.	FC Rosendaël (10)	1–0	Wattrelos FC (11)
19.	JSC Ostricourt (12)	1–2	US Mardyck (11)
20.	US Bray-Dunes (10)	2–1	AS Albeck Grand-Synthe (10)
21.	CS Gondecourt (11)	2–6	AS Dockers Dunkerque (10)
22.	ASF Coudekerque (12)	2–0	US Fleurbaisienne (11)
23.	ES Genech (10)	5–1	CO Quaëdypre (10)
24.	AS Templeuve-en-Pévèle (8)	1–2	Leers OF (9)
25.	ES Lille Louvière Pellevoisin (10)	1–5	US Portugais Roubaix Tourcoing (8)
26.	US Wallon-Cappel (13)	3–0 (Note: Olympique Mérignies penalised for not submitting a team sheet before the game. US Wallon-Cappel qualify. Original scoreline 3–8.)	Olympique Mérignies (12)
27.	AS Willems (13)	0–11	US Téteghem (9)
28.	US Marquette (8)	7–4	US Yser (9)
29.	FC Bauvin (10)	1–0	AS Radinghem (11)
30.	JS Steenwerck (10)	0–1	US Phalempin (10)
31.	USF Armbouts-Cappel (10)	0–5	AS Dunkerque Sud (8)
32.	EC Anstaing-Chéreng-Tressin-Gruson (8)	6–2	SC Bourbourg (8)
33.	Olympique Hémois (10)	2–4	OS Fives (8)
34.	AS Loos Oliveaux (12)	0–5	CG Haubourdin (9)
35.	SC Bailleulois (8)	2–4	IC Lambersart (8)
36.	FC Madeleinois (9)	3–2	ESC Illies-Aubers-Lorgies (9)
37.	FC Forestois (11)	0–2	SM Petite-Synthe (10)
38.	US Antillais Lille Métropole (12)	3–4 (a.e.t.)	Stade Lezennois (10)
39.	FC Sailly-lez-Lannoy (11)	1–5	JS Lille Wazemmes (9)
40.	US Godewaersvelde (12)	0–9	US Ascq (8)
41.	FA Blanc Seau (11)	1–4	Colisée Vimaranense Roubaix (10)
42.	FC Berquinois (11)	6–3 (a.e.t.)	Faches-Thumesnil FC (11)
43.	AAJ Uxem (10)	3–0	EAC Cysoing-Wannehain-Bourghelles (11)
44.	USF Coudekerquois (10)	0–9	ASC Hazebrouck (8)
45.	Lille Faches (13)	4–2	ES Boeschepe (11)
46.	ASE Allennoise (11)	1–5	Fort-Mardyck OC (11)
47.	AS Rexpoëde (13)	1–0	JS Wavrin-Don (9)
48.	FC Wambrechies (10)	4–1	FC St Folquin (11)
49.	SR Lomme Délivrance (11)	0–8	FC Lambersart (9)
50.	Football St Michel Quesnoy (11)	1–4	US Wattrelos (8)
51.	AF Deux-Synthe (12)	0–13	OSM Lomme (10)
52.	FC Le Doulieu (11)	1–4	SCO Roubaix (8)
53.	ES Roncq (9)	5–0	FC Wattignies (10)
54.	USCC St Pol-sur-Mer (10)	5–6	FC Nieppois (11)
55.	ACS Hoymille (10)	4–3	CS EIC Tourcoing (12)
56.	FC La Chapelle-d'Armentières (10)	4–0	RC Spycker (11)
57.	CS Bousbecque (10)	0–5	FC Seclin (8)
58.	Prémesques FC (12)	3–4	SC Grand-Fort-Philippe (8)
59.	AS Pont de Nieppe (12)	2–4	FC Méteren (11)
60.	AS Steenvorde (8)	1–1 (2–4 p)	ES Wormhout (9)
61.	EC Houplines (10)	0–7	FC Santes (8)
62.	FC Craywick (13)	1–3	ACS Comines (9)
63.	US Marquillies (12)	0–9	AS Hellemmes (9)
64.	Entente Steenbecque-Morbecque (12)	1–3	US Fretin (10)
65.	USM Merville (12)	0–6	OSM Sequedin (9)
66.	FA Neuvilloise (8)	8–0	AS Marcq (13)
67.	FC Mons-en-Barœul (12)	2–1	Flers OS (10)
68.	US Lederzeele (13)	1–6	Union Halluinoise (9)
69.	FC Bondues (8)	2–0	OC Roubaisien (9)
70.	US Leffrinckoucke (10)	2–6	FC Linselles (9)

These matches are from the Artois district only, and were played on 26 and 29 August 2018 (with one match replayed on 2 September 2018).

First round results: Hauts-de-France (Artois)
Tie no	Home team (tier)	Score	Away team (tier)
1.	JS Bourecquoise (15)	2–7	Entente Verquin-Béthune (14)
2.	AS Cauchy-à-la-Tour (15)	2–1	Intrépides Norrent-Fontes (14)
3.	AFC Libercourtois (15)	2–1	FC Hauts Lens (13)
4.	FC Richebourg (14)	1–3	FC Busnes (13)
5.	JS Achiet-le-Petit (15)	3–7	US Mondicourt (13)
6.	US Boubers-Conchy (14)	0–6	AS Vallée de la Ternoise (12)
7.	AS Neuvireuil-Gavrelle (13)	3–1 (a.e.t.)	FC Estevelles (14)
8.	Stade Héninois (14)	0–2	SC Fouquières (12)
9.	CSAL Souchez (13)	2–2 (3–2 p)	US Lapugnoy (12)
10.	US Maisnil (14)	3–0	RC Locon 2000 (14)
11.	AS Noyelles-lés-Vermelles (13)	3–1 (a.e.t.)	AJ Ruitz (14)
12.	FC Servins (12)	3–2 (a.e.t.)	CS Pernes (12)
13.	ES Agny (14)	3–2	Sud Artois (11)
14.	US Ham-en-Artois (14)	1–3	ES Allouagne (12)
15.	SC Aubigny/Savy-Berlette Association (13)	0–6	Olympique Arras (14)
16.	FC Hersin (13)	9–1	ES Éleu (14)
17.	US Izel-lès-Équerchin (14)	7–1	FC Méricourt (15)
18.	AJ Neuville (13)	1–1 (2–3 p)	ES Saulty (14)
19.	Olympique Vendin (13)	5–2	FC Tortequesne (14)
20.	US Ablain (12)	2–4	US Hesdigneul (12)
21.	FC Dynamo Carvin Fosse 4 (13)	0–2	ES Angres (12)
22.	US Rivière (13)	0–7	AO Hermies (11)
23.	ES Buissy-Baralle (13)	1–4	Olympique Héninois (11)
24.	AS Bapaume-Bertincourt-Vaulx-Vraucourt (12)	2–4	AS Pont-á-Vendin (13)
25.	AS Robecq (13)	4–1	ES Haillicourt (13)
26.	FC Beaumont (13)	0–5	AS Loison (11)
27.	AS Maroeuil (12)	1–3 (a.e.t.)	AS Roclincourt (13)
28.	FC Annay (12)	4–2	US Grenay (12)
29.	AS Courrièroise (11)	5–2	FC Dainvillois (12)
30.	CS Habarcq (12)	5–0 (Note: AOSC Sallaumines penalised for fielding more than two players registered outside of the agreed window. CS Habarcq qualify. Original scoreline 2–2 (5–3 p).)	AOSC Sallaumines (10)
31.	ES Val Sensée (12)	2–4	AAE Évin-Malmaison (10)
32.	La Couture FC (11)	6–1	AS Auchy-les-Mines (12)
33.	AS Brebières (11)	4–0	OC Cojeul (12)
34.	FC La Roupie-Isbergues (12)	3–0	Olympique Liévin (10)
35.	US Beuvry (11)	0–2	Diables Rouges Lambres-lez-Aire (12)
36.	UC Divion (11)	0–1	FC Lillers (12)
37.	US Annezin (11)	0–2	COS Marles-Lozinghem (8)
38.	Olympique Burbure (11)	2–2 (7–6 p)	AS Tincquizel (9)
39.	AAE Dourges (11)	3–4	AS Sailly-Labourse (11)
40.	EC Mazingarbe (11)	4–3	US Lestrem (9)
41.	US Pas-en-Artois (11)	0–2	JS Écourt-St Quentin (9)
42.	Auchel FC (11)	4–0	AAE Aix-Noulette (11)
43.	US Arleux-en-Gohelle (11)	0–4 (Note: US Arleux-en-Gohelle penalised for fielding a suspended player. RC Sains qualify. Original scoreline 3–4.)	RC Sains (11)
44.	AJ Artois (11)	0–2 (Note: Match was replayed, having originally finished with a scoreline of 1–3, due to a refereeing error regarding substitutions.)	US St Pol-sur-Ternoise (8)
45.	ASC Camblain-l'Abbé (11)	2–2 (4–2 p)	US Courcelles (11)
46.	AS Beaurains (10)	0–3	US Ruch Carvin (11)
47.	ES Anzin-St Aubin (10)	3–2	USO Drocourt (11)
48.	US Monchy-au-Bois (11)	5–3 (a.e.t.)	AS Lensoise (11)
49.	AS Violaines (10)	3–3 (4–2 p)	ES Ste Catherine (10)
50.	USA Liévin (10)	1–4	OS Annequin (9)
51.	JF Guarbecque (10)	1–3	AFCL Liebaut (9)
52.	ESD Isbergues (9)	3–3 (4–5 p)	ES Haisnes (10)
53.	UAS Harnes (10)	2–3	US Gonnehem-Busnettes (9)
54.	ES Labeuvrière (9)	1–0 (a.e.t.)	FC Hinges (10)
55.	Espérance Calonne Liévin (10)	1–2 (a.e.t.)	FC Montigny-en-Gohelle (8)
56.	FC Bouvigny-Boyeffles (9)	0–4	AC Noyelles-Godault (10)
57.	ES St Laurent-Blangy (10)	1–4	USO Lens (8)
58.	SC Pro Patria Wingles (9)	0–2	Carabiniers Billy-Montigny (8)
59.	Tilloy FC (10)	1–3	US Noyelles-sous-Lens (8)
60.	ES Laventie (9)	2–4	AS Ste Barbe-Oignies (8)
61.	US Billy-Berclau (9)	1–0	AG Grenay (8)
62.	Calonne-Ricouart FC Cite 6 (9)	2–0	ES Bully-les-Mines (8)
63.	SC Artésien (9)	3–2	SC St Nicolas-lez-Arras (8)
64.	US Cheminots Avion (11)	0–5	CS Diana Liévin (9)
65.	USO Bruay-la-Buissière (8)	1–1 (4–3 p)	US Rouvroy (9)
66.	RC Labourse (10)	2–2 (5–4 p)	USO Meurchin (10)
67.	AS Vendin (14)	0–8	JF Mazingarbe (12)
68.	AS Hulluch (15)	1–4	ES Douvrin (14)
69.	AS Frévent (11)	2–2 (3–4 p)	AS Barlin (11)
70.	RC Avesnes-le-Comte (12)	3–5	AS Quiéry-la-Motte (13)

These matches are from the Escaut district only, and were played on 26 and 30 August 2018.

First round results: Hauts-de-France (Escaut)
Tie no	Home team (tier)	Score	Away team (tier)
1.	AS Étrœungt (13)	0–3	AS Douzies (8)
2.	JS Avesnelloise (14)	2–5	US Villers-Pol (12)
3.	Unicité FC (14)	0–7	US Berlaimont (10)
4.	US Cousolre (10)	3–0 (a.e.t.) (Note: AS Hautmont penalised for fielding a suspended player. US Cousolre qualify. Original scoreline 2–3 (a.e.t.).)	AS Hautmont (8)
5.	US Beaufort/Limont-Fontaine (14)	1–4	FC Epinette-Maubeuge (9)
6.	US Villersoise (14)	0–7	AG Solrézienne (10)
7.	US Gommegnies-Carnoy (10)	2–4	Olympique Maroilles (11)
8.	US Prisches (13)	0–1	ES Boussois (11)
9.	AS Dompierre (11)	2–0	AS La Longueville (10)
10.	FC Jenlain (13)	0–3	US Fourmies (9)
11.	Maubeuge FCCA (11)	1–1 (3–4 p)	ASG Louvroil (9)
12.	AS Preux-au-Bois (15)	0–8	AS Obies (14)
13.	FC Leval (14)	1–8	US Glageon (12)
14.	US Landrecies (13)	1–9	IC Ferrière-la-Grande (10)
15.	SA Le Quesnoy (11)	0–1	SC Bachant (11)
16.	US Jeumont (10)	2–1	US Bavay (8)
17.	SC St Remy-du-Nord (12)	1–6	US Rousies (11)
18.	Wignehies Olympique (12)	1–3	AS Trélon (12)
19.	AFC Ferrière-la-Petite (12)	2–3	Red Star Jeumont (13)
20.	US Sars-Poteries (14)	0–2	OSC Assevent (10)
21.	Maubeuge Olympique (13)	0–5	US Englefontaine (14)
22.	AFC Colleret (13)	1–6	FC St Hilaire-sur-Helpe (12)
23.	FC Fontaine-au-Bois (14)	2–4	AS Bellignies (13)
24.	FC Avesnes-sur-Helpe (8)	0–2	Sports Podéens Réunis (9)
25.	SCEPS Pont-sur-Sambre (12)	0–7	FC Marpent (8)
26.	SC Le Cateau (12)	3–3 (6–5 p)	ES Paillencourt-Estrun (11)
27.	FC Cambrai-St Roch (13)	4–0	AS Gouzeaucourt (14)
28.	US Rumilly (12)	11–0	US Busigny (13)
29.	FC Solesmes (11)	2–4 (a.e.t.) (Note: Tie switched at the request of both clubs.)	FC Provillois (10)
30.	FC Pommereuil (14)	0–3 (Note: Tie won by forfeit.)	US Haussy (11)
31.	US Ors (14)	0–8	FC Saulzoir (10)
32.	AS Masnières (10)	1–2	ES Villers-Outréaux (9)
33.	US Beauvois Fontaine (13)	0–5	US Élincourt (9)
34.	AS Vendegies-Escarmain (12)	0–5	ES Caudry (9)
35.	FC Maretz (13)	3–0 (Note: US St Souplet penalised for fielding a suspended player. FC Maretz qualify. Original scoreline 1–2 (a.e.t.).)	US St Souplet (11)
36.	AS Montay (13)	0–3	FC Neuville-St Rémy (9)
37.	OM Cambrai Amérique (10)	1–0	SS Marcoing (11)
38.	US Viesly (11)	4–1	US Bertry-Clary (12)
39.	FC Iwuy (12)	4–8 (a.e.t.)	US St Aubert (9)
40.	AS Neuvilly (13)	1–0	Olympique St Ollois (12)
41.	St Vaast FC (12)	4–3	OC Avesnois (11)
42.	US Les Rues-des-Vignes (15)	2–5	US Fontaine-Notre-Dame (11)
43.	AS Lesdain (14)	0–8	Entente Ligny/Olympique Caullery (12)
44.	US Briastre (14)	2–1 (a.e.t.)	US Walincourt-Selvigny (11)
45.	US Quiévy (12)	0–1	US Bourlon-Hanyecourt-Épinoy (13)
46.	US Pecquencourt (11)	0–3 (Note: US Pecquencourt penalised for fielding a suspended player. US Pont Flers qualify. Original scoreline 2–0.)	US Pont Flers (10)
47.	AS Beuvry-la-Forêt (9)	4–1	UF Anhiers (10)
48.	Olympic Marchiennois (12)	1–3	AS Courchelettes (10)
49.	US Aubigny-au-Bac (14)	3–2	AEF Leforest (8)
50.	FC Roost-Warendin (11)	3–0	FC Fressain-Cantin (15)
51.	US Frais Marais (12)	9–1	FC Monchecourt (13)
52.	US Raimbeaucourt (11)	2–4	SC Aniche (8)
53.	Olympique Landasien (11)	3–1	AS Douai-Lambres Cheminots (11)
54.	US Auberchicourt (13)	1–13	Olympique Senséen (8)
55.	Olympique Marquette (13)	4–0	FC Bruille-lez-Marchiennes (13)
56.	ESM Hamel (12)	3–1	US Erre-Hornaing (10)
57.	US Aubygeoise (14)	0–3 (Note: US Aubygeoise penalised for playing more than two players registered outside the agreed window. Olympique Flinois qualify. Original scoreline 0–2.)	Olympique Flinois (10)
58.	DC Lallaing (13)	0–6	AS Cuincy (10)
59.	FC Nomain (14)	0–4	Les Épis Foot (11)
60.	AS Coutiches (13)	3–0 (Note: FC Masny penalised for fielding a suspended player. AS Coutiches qualify. Original scoreline 0–3.)	FC Masny (9)
61.	AF Rieulay (14)	0–3	Stade Orchésien (9)
62.	RC Lécluse (11)	0–1	AS Sin-le-Noble (9)
63.	US Loffre-Erchin (12)	3–0 (Note: USAC Somain penalised for fielding a suspended player. US Loffre-Erchin qualify. Original scoreline 2–3.)	USAC Somain (9)
64.	Dechy Sports (12)	2–4 (a.e.t.)	US Corbehem (12)
65.	US Montigny-en-Ostrevent (10)	1–3	SC Guesnain (8)
66.	FC Pecquencourt (13)	3–0 (Note: FC Férin penalised for fielding a suspended player. FC Pecquencourt qualify. Original scoreline 0–6.)	FC Férin (11)
67.	ES Bouchain (11)	3–3 (1–4 p)	St Waast CFC (11)
68.	ES Sebourg-Estreux (12)	2–3	Stade Fresnois (9)
69.	US Lieu-St Amand (12)	2–4	Vieux Condé (10)
70.	ES Noyelloise (14)	1–3	JS Haveluy (12)
71.	Maing FC (10)	2–2 (6–7 p)	US Hordain (9)
72.	FC Lecelles-Rosult (11)	1–2	FC Quarouble (8)
73.	SC Vicq (13)	2–5	AS Summer Club Valenciennes (10)
74.	AFC Escautpont (11)	1–0	US Briquette (12)
75.	AS Thivencelle (14)	2–0	AS Artres (12)
76.	USM Beuvrages (10)	2–1	ES Crespin (10)
77.	US Hergnies (13)	1–1 (3–2 p)	St Saulve Foot (11)
78.	RC Rœulx (14)	3–0 (a.e.t.)	AS Petite-Forêt (13)
79.	AS Château-l'Abbaye (12)	2–1	EA Prouvy (10)
80.	Olympique Millonfossois (13)	1–6	USM Marly (10)
81.	AS Curgies (12)	2–1	Dutemple FC Valenciennes (8)
82.	Olympique Onnaingeois (10)	2–0	FC Saultain (11)
83.	Douchy FC (11)	2–2 (4–5 p)	FC Raismes (8)
84.	Hérin-Aubry CLE (14)	0–7	US Aulnoy (10)
85.	FC Famars (11)	3–4	AS Wavrechain-sous-Denain (12)
86.	Neuville OSC (14)	1–3	Denain OSC (12)
87.	CO Trith-St Léger (11)	2–4	JO Wallers-Arenberg (10)
88.	JS Abscon (10)	0–2	Bruay Sports (9)
89.	US Haulchin (14)	1–9	Anzin FARC (10)

These matches are from the Oise district only, and were played on 26 August 2018.

First round results: Hauts-de-France (Oise)
Tie no	Home team (tier)	Score	Away team (tier)
1.	AS Noailles-Cauvigny (11)	0–2	US Paillart (11)
2.	EC Villers/Bailleul (12)	1–1 (1–3 p)	FC La Neuville-Roy (12)
3.	JS Thieux (12)	1–3 (a.e.t.)	FC Nointel (10)
4.	Tricot OS (11)	1–4	US Bresloise (9)
5.	AS Maignelay-Montigny (12)	3–2	US Beuvraignes (12)
6.	CS Haudivillers (10)	0–3	US Étouy (8)
7.	Rollot AC (12)	4–3 (a.e.t.)	FC Cauffry (10)
8.	JS Bulles (12)	1–0 (a.e.t.)	FC Liancourt-Clermont (9)
9.	ESC Wavignies (9)	1–1 (7–8 p)	US Plessis-Brion (10)
10.	AS Breuil-le-Vert (11)	0–5	AS St Sauveur (Oise) (9)
11.	ES Remy (11)	2–0	FC Sacy-St Martin (12)
12.	US Attichy (14)	0–15	AS Multien (11)
13.	AS Montmacq (12)	1–0	ASC Val d'Automne (11)
14.	FC Ruraville (13)	0–2	AS Silly-le-Long (10)
15.	ES Thiers-sur-Thève (13)	2–4	FC Lagny-Plessis (11)
16.	AS Pontpoint (11)	1–7	US Margny-lès-Compiègne (8)
17.	US Pierrefonds (13)	0–4	FC Clairoix (10)
18.	FCJ Noyon (13)	0–5	US Ribécourt (8)
19.	ES Compiègne (11)	2–5	FC Béthisy (9)
20.	ES Ormoy-Duvy (11)	4–2	US Crépy-en-Valois (9)
21.	JS Guiscard (13)	0–3	FC Longueil-Annel (8)
22.	CSM Mesnil-en-Thelle (10)	1–2 (a.e.t.)	AS Verneuil-en-Halatte (9)
23.	AS Laigneville (12)	0–2	AS Orry-La-Chapelle (10)
24.	US Nanteuil FC (12)	4–4 (4–5 p)	FC Carlepont (11)
25.	US Verberie (13)	1–2	Canly FC (11)
26.	JS Moliens (13)	3–3 (2–3 p)	RC Précy (11)
27.	FC St Sulpice (12)	2–1 (a.e.t.)	AS St Remy-en-l'Eau (13)
28.	AS Bornel (12)	4–0	AS Auneuil (10)
29.	SCC Sérifontaine (10)	3–2	US Fouquenies (9)
30.	US St Germer-de-Fly (11)	0–0 (1–4 p)	EFC Dieudonné Puiseux (10)
31.	ASPTT Beauvais (10)	1–2	AS Allonne (8)
32.	AJ Laboissière-en-Thelle (10)	1–2	US Gouvieux (9)
33.	FC St Just des Marais (12)	1–13	Grandvilliers AC (10)
34.	US Froissy (11)	1–5	US Lamorlaye (9)
35.	US Crèvecœur-le-Grand (10)	10–0	US Mouy (12)
36.	Amicale Fleury Trie Château (12)	1–3	AS Montchrevreuil (9)
37.	AS Rochy-Condé (12)	2–2 (7–8 p)	AS La Neuville-sur-Oudeuil (11)
38.	FC Fontainettes St Aubin (11)	3–0 (Note: Tie won by forfeit.)	CO Beauvais (10)
39.	US Ste Geneviève (12)	0–3	SC Songeons (9)
40.	US Marseille-en-Beauvaisis (10)	1–2	AS Ons-en-Bray (11)
41.	AS Hénonville (13)	2–4	FC St Paul (11)
42.	USE St Leu d'Esserent (9)	1–1 (3–4 p)	US Estrées-St Denis (8)
43.	ES Formerie (10)	2–3	USC Portugais de Beauvais (11)
44.	RC Campremy (12)	1–5	US Cires-lès-Mello (9)
45.	AS Noyers-Saint-Martin (12)	0–4	USR St Crépin-Ibouvillers (10)
46.	OC Bury (11)	3–0	US Lassigny (9)
47.	AS La Neuville-en-Hez (13)	3–0	AS Fitz-James (?)
48.	AS Verderel-lès-Sauqueuse (11)	3–2 (a.e.t.)	US Breuil-le-Sec (11)
49.	FC Angy (10)	0–2	SC St Just-en-Chaussée (8)
50.	CS Avilly-St Léonard (10)	1–4	JSA Compiègne-La Croix-St Ouen (9)
51.	CA Venette (11)	1–1 (0–3 p)	Stade Ressontois (9)
52.	AS Mareuil-sur-Ourcq (12)	1–2	AS Thourotte (12)
53.	AS Coye-la-Forêt (12)	1–4	AS Plailly (10)
54.	FC Boran (11)	0–3	Hermes-Berthecourt AC (10)

== Second to third round framing ==
The Escaut district required a framing round, to reduce the number of teams going forwards to the third round from 44 to 43. This match was played on 8 September 2018.

Second to Third Round Framing round results: Hauts-de-France (Escaut)
Tie no	Home team (tier)	Score	Away team (tier)
1.	US Frais Marais (12)	2–1	Stade Orchésien (9)

== Third round ==
These matches were played on 15 and 16 September 2018.

Third round results: Hauts-de-France
Tie no	Home team (tier)	Score	Away team (tier)
1.	AS Douzies (8)	1–3 (a.e.t.)	Olympique Saint-Quentin (5)
2.	FC Mareuil-Caubert (11)	0–7	Stade Portelois (6)
3.	Septmonts OC (10)	1–9	US Chantilly (5)
4.	Amicale Pascal Calais (7)	2–1 (a.e.t.)	JA Armentières (8)
5.	US Chauny (7)	1–2	US Choisy-au-Bac (6)
6.	ES Agny (14)	1–5	FC Méaulte (10)
7.	FC Hersin (13)	2–5	AS Marck (6)
8.	FC Seclin (8)	1–2	FC Loon-Plage (6)
9.	AS Wimereux (9)	1–3	ES Oye-Plage (8)
10.	Olympique St Martin Boulogne (9)	3–2	COS Marles-Lozinghem (8)
11.	AS Loison (11)	1–3	Calais Beau-Marais (9)
12.	Fort-Mardyck OC (11)	0–1	FJEP Fort Vert (10)
13.	Auchel FC (11)	1–0	JS Desvroise (9)
14.	RC Labourse (10)	2–1	US Warhem (9)
15.	FC La Chapelle-d'Armentières (10)	0–4	US Pays de Cassel (7)
16.	FC Wambrechies (10)	1–2	ES Calaisis Coulogne (8)
17.	ES St Léonard (9)	1–3 (a.e.t.)	Olympique Lumbrois (7)
18.	Diables Rouges Lambres-lez-Aire (12)	2–4	AFCL Liebaut (9)
19.	Verlinghem Foot (10)	0–1	FC Dunkerque-Malo Plage (7)
20.	US Gravelines (6)	1–0	JS Longuenesse (7)
21.	FC Rosendaël (10)	0–8	Olympique Grande-Synthe (5)
22.	Union Halluinoise (9)	4–0	US Landrethun-le-Nord (10)
23.	SC Coquelles (8)	0–3	AS Outreau (7)
24.	AS Cucq (9)	1–0	RC Doullens (7)
25.	US Montreuil (8)	1–5	Le Touquet AC (5)
26.	FC Oisemont (10)	2–4	ES Anzin-St Aubin (10)
27.	AS Fruges (11)	1–4	OSM Lomme (10)
28.	ABC2F Candas (11)	2–1	AF Étaples Haute Ville (9)
29.	FC Nordausques (9)	0–3	SC Abbeville (6)
30.	Olympique Hesdin-Marconne (9)	1–3	AS Gamaches (6)
31.	AS Calais (13)	2–3	AS Conchil-le-Temple (10)
32.	Olympique Héninois (11)	1–5	Roubaix SC (7)
33.	Olympique Burbure (11)	1–3	USO Lens (8)
34.	SM Petite-Synthe (10)	0–3	FCP Blendecques (11)
35.	CA Éperlecques (9)	1–2 (a.e.t.)	Stella Lys (8)
36.	ES Mametz (11)	1–2 (a.e.t.)	CG Haubourdin (9)
37.	ES Haisnes (10)	1–3	US Vermelles (7)
38.	US Lesquin (7)	4–0	US Lille Moulins Carrel (7)
39.	SC Hazebrouck (6)	1–1 (2–3 p)	Stade Béthunois (6)
40.	ES Angres (12)	1–2 (a.e.t.)	FC Wardrecques (10)
41.	AS Cauchy-à-la-Tour (15)	0–8	FA Neuvilloise (8)
42.	US St André (8)	1–2	Olympique Marcquois Football (5)
43.	AS Tournehem (10)	0–2	OS Annequin (9)
44.	US Ascq (8)	1–1 (5–3 p)	OS Aire-sur-la-Lys (7)
45.	FC Sangatte (10)	1–2	Mons AC (8)
46.	AS Ste Barbe-Oignies (8)	3–1	US St Quentin-Bléssy (9)
47.	FC Annay (12)	1–5	CS Diana Liévin (9)
48.	AS Noyelles-lés-Vermelles (13)	0–2	AS Brebières (11)
49.	AAE Évin-Malmaison (10)	1–2	Colisée Vimaranense Roubaix (10)
50.	La Couture FC (11)	4–1	AO Sainghinoise (9)
51.	US Phalempin (10)	0–3	Carabiniers Billy-Montigny (8)
52.	US Portugais Roubaix Tourcoing (8)	1–0 (a.e.t.)	FC Lambersart (9)
53.	US St Maurice Loos-en-Gohelle (7)	3–4	Wasquehal Football (6)
54.	AS Hellemmes (9)	1–2	US Tourcoing FC (5)
55.	US Bray-Dunes (10)	0–7	FC Tatinghem (8)
56.	SC Artésien (9)	1–2	AS Dockers Dunkerque (10)
57.	EC Mazingarbe (11)	1–5	US Saint-Omer (6)
58.	ES Arques (8)	0–4	US Nœux-les-Mines (6)
59.	ES Roncq (9)	4–2	FC Lille Sud (7)
60.	AFC Libercourtois (15)	0–1	AS Dunkerque Sud (8)
61.	Leers OF (9)	0–2	FC Montigny-en-Gohelle (8)
62.	AS Wavrechain-sous-Denain (12)	0–10	US Mineurs Waziers (6)
63.	JS Haveluy (12)	1–4	ES Lambresienne (7)
64.	US Corbehem (12)	1–3	Anzin FARC (10)
65.	JO Wallers-Arenberg (10)	2–7	US Escaudain (7)
66.	AFC Escautpont (11)	0–1	US Aulnoy (10)
67.	Olympique Onnaingeois (10)	2–1	SC Aniche (8)
68.	US Maisnil (14)	0–7	FC Santes (8)
69.	JS Écourt-St Quentin (9)	1–5	CS Avion (6)
70.	FC Servins (12)	0–4	ES Mouvalloise (8)
71.	FC Bondues (8)	9–3	AS Sin-le-Noble (9)
72.	US Biachoise (7)	0–2	Saint-Amand FC (6)
73.	FC Saulzoir (10)	1–3	FC Raismes (8)
74.	IC La Sentinelle (7)	0–2	US Maubeuge (5)
75.	ESM Hamel (12)	4–3	Olympique Flinois (10)
76.	AS Beuvry-la-Forêt (9)	4–1	AS Cuincy (10)
77.	SC Douai (7)	5–1	Olympique Senséen (8)
78.	Olympique Maroilles (11)	0–2	ES Caudry (9)
79.	US Marquette (8)	0–2	Entente Itancourt-Neuville (6)
80.	US Glageon (12)	1–3	US Ribemont Mezieres FC (7)
81.	FC Provillois (10)	3–2	Sports Podéens Réunis (9)
82.	US Fourmies (9)	3–1	ICS Créçois (7)
83.	IC Ferrière-la-Grande (10)	1–3	US Guignicourt (6)
84.	US Fontaine-Notre-Dame (11)	0–2	FC Quarouble (8)
85.	US Berlaimont (10)	2–0	ASG Louvroil (9)
86.	Bruay Sports (9)	6–1	Red Star Jeumont (13)
87.	AG Solrézienne (10)	0–5	IC Lambersart (8)
88.	ES Villers-Outréaux (9)	0–2	AC Cambrai (7)
89.	FC Neuville-St Rémy (9)	1–3	RC Bohain (7)
90.	Entente Ligny/Olympique Caullery (12)	1–3	CAS Escaudœuvres (7)
91.	AS Curgies (12)	0–2	ES Boussois (11)
92.	AS Obies (14)	0–4	SAS Moy de l'Aisne (8)
93.	SC Le Cateau (12)	1–5	FC Marpent (8)
94.	AS Beaurevoir (10)	2–1	AS Allonne (8)
95.	US Camon (7)	0–2	AAE Chaulnes (7)
96.	SC Flixecourt (10)	0–8	ESC Longueau (7)
97.	US Monchy-au-Bois (11)	1–3	RC Amiens (7)
98.	ES Saulty (14)	1–6	FC Porto Portugais Amiens (7)
99.	US Corbie (10)	0–4	US Ailly-sur-Somme (6)
100.	ES Vers-sur-Selle (13)	1–2	SC St Just-en-Chaussée (8)
101.	AS Querrieu (10)	0–3	Harly Quentin (8)
102.	Grandvilliers AC (10)	1–6	AC Amiens (5)
103.	US St Pol-sur-Ternoise (8)	1–2	US Nogent (6)
104.	Olympique Le Hamel (11)	1–8	US Vimy (6)
105.	AS Plailly (10)	2–4	US Vervins (10)
106.	FC Longueil-Annel (8)	1–0	OC Bury (11)
107.	JS Bulles (12)	3–1 (a.e.t.)	Marle Sports (12)
108.	US Athies-sous-Laon (10)	1–2	USM Senlisienne (5)
109.	L'Arsenal Club Achery-Beautor-Charmes (7)	1–4	AFC Compiègne (6)
110.	US La Fère (11)	1–1 (1–3 p)	RC Précy (11)
111.	US Aulnois-sous-Laon (11)	0–2	US Laon (6)
112.	FC Fonsomme (10)	2–3 (a.e.t.)	US Estrées-St Denis (8)
113.	US Crépy Vivaise (10)	0–2	ES Ormoy-Duvy (11)
114.	FC Monceau-lès-Leups (10)	0–2	US Bruyères-et-Montbérault (9)
115.	AS Silly-le-Long (10)	0–2	Château Thierry-Étampes FC (6)
116.	ES Valois Multien (7)	0–1	US St Maximin (7)
117.	FC Soissons (7)	1–2	Montdidier AC (7)
118.	AS Verneuil-en-Halatte (9)	0–5	AS Beauvais Oise (5)
119.	AF Amiens (14)	2–2 (5–4 p)	FC St Paul (11)
120.	US Cires-lès-Mello (9)	0–2	AFC Holnon-Fayet (9)
121.	ES Remy (11)	1–4	FC Béthisy (9)
122.	AS St Sauveur 80 (10)	1–7	US Roye-Noyon (6)
123.	AS Orry-La-Chapelle (10)	0–2	Gauchy-Grugies St Quentin FC (8)
124.	Union Sud Aisne FC (8)	2–0 (a.e.t.)	CS Villeneuve St Germain (9)
125.	US Chevrières-Grandfresnoy (7)	1–0	Tergnier FC (7)
126.	Stade Portugais St Quentin (9)	2–2 (6–4 p)	US Pont Ste-Maxence (7)
127.	FC La Neuville-Roy (12)	1–2 (a.e.t.)	US Margny-lès-Compiègne (8)
128.	US Paillart (11)	0–2	AFC Creil (7)
129.	UES Vermand (11)	1–2	US Lamorlaye (9)
130.	FC Nointel (10)	0–4	Internationale Soissonnaise (7)
131.	CS Amiens Montières Étouvie (9)	2–4 (a.e.t.)	US Balagny-St Epin (6)
132.	Stade Ressontois (9)	4–0	AS Villers-Bretonneux (9)
133.	FC Carlepont (11)	1–3	Conty Lœuilly SC (9)
134.	ES Cagny (11)	0–0 (4–3 p)	US Ouvriere Albert (9)
135.	Amiens Picardie FC (12)	3–3 (4–5 p)	US Gouvieux (9)
136.	AS St Sauveur (Oise) (9)	1–0	UA Fère-en-Tardenois (10)
137.	US Ribécourt (8)	0–1	SC Moreuil (9)
138.	Poix-Blangy-Croixrault FC (11)	1–2	US Meru Sandricourt (7)
139.	FC Billy-sur-Aisne (10)	0–3	AS du Pays Neslois (6)
140.	JS Quevauvillers (9)	1–3	US Breteuil (7)
141.	CS Chaumont-en-Vexin (7)	2–0	Standard FC Montataire (7)
142.	US Abbeville (10)	3–1	JS Miannay-Moyenneville-Lambercourt (8)
143.	US Ambleteuse (10)	0–6	ASC Hazebrouck (8)
144.	JS Cambron (11)	2–3	JS Condette (10)
145.	US Attin (8)	3–1	US Friville-Escarbotin (7)
146.	US Porteloise (10)	1–2	FC Centuloise (8)
147.	ES Wormhout (9)	3–2 (a.e.t.)	AS Étaples (7)
148.	US Frais Marais (12)	1–0	FC Cambrai-St Roch (13)
149.	ASC Camblain-l'Abbé (11)	0–3	ES Enquin-les-Mines (9)
150.	CS La Gorgue (7)	1–1 (4–5 p)	Villeneuve-d'Ascq Métropole (7)
151.	OM Cambrai Amérique (10)	4–1	USM Beuvrages (10)

== Fourth round ==
These matches were played on 28, 29 and 30 September 2018.

Fourth round results: Hauts-de-France
Tie no	Home team (tier)	Score	Away team (tier)
1.	FC Béthisy (9)	4–3	CS Chaumont-en-Vexin (7)
2.	FC Montigny-en-Gohelle (8)	2–2 (4–2 p)	Entente Itancourt-Neuville (6)
3.	FC Méaulte (10)	1–3 (a.e.t.)	Carabiniers Billy-Montigny (8)
4.	AS Beaurevoir (10)	1–2	FC Porto Portugais Amiens (7)
5.	RC Précy (11)	1–3 (a.e.t.)	FC Provillois (10)
6.	Harly Quentin (8)	0–1	US Balagny-St Epin (6)
7.	AFC Holnon-Fayet (9)	0–1	US Gouvieux (9)
8.	OM Cambrai Amérique (10)	0–7	Olympique Saint-Quentin (5)
9.	RC Amiens (7)	2–1	Gauchy-Grugies St Quentin FC (8)
10.	AS Beuvry-la-Forêt (9)	3–1	SC Douai (7)
11.	US Vervins (10)	1–2 (a.e.t.)	FC Santes (8)
12.	FC Marpent (8)	0–4	US Tourcoing FC (5)
13.	USO Lens (8)	3–5	FC Bondues (8)
14.	US Bruyères-et-Montbérault (9)	2–0	US Ribemont Mezieres FC (7)
15.	ES Boussois (11)	1–2 (a.e.t.)	RC Labourse (10)
16.	ES Mouvalloise (8)	1–0	US Fourmies (9)
17.	US Nœux-les-Mines (6)	1–3 (a.e.t.)	USM Senlisienne (5)
18.	US Choisy-au-Bac (6)	1–1 (3–1 p)	AC Cambrai (7)
19.	US Frais Marais (12)	2–2 (3–5 p)	AS Gamaches (6)
20.	Conty Lœuilly SC (9)	1–6	AS Beauvais Oise (5)
21.	US Roye-Noyon (6)	2–3	AS du Pays Neslois (6)
22.	Stade Ressontois (9)	0–7	AC Amiens (5)
23.	US Margny-lès-Compiègne (8)	2–3	Stade Portugais St Quentin (9)
24.	JS Bulles (12)	1–0	SC St Just-en-Chaussée (8)
25.	ES Ormoy-Duvy (11)	1–5	US Ailly-sur-Somme (6)
26.	US St Maximin (7)	4–2 (a.e.t.)	AAE Chaulnes (7)
27.	FC Longueil-Annel (8)	0–2	Château Thierry-Étampes FC (6)
28.	Montdidier AC (7)	3–5	AFC Compiègne (6)
29.	US Lamorlaye (9)	1–3	Internationale Soissonnaise (7)
30.	SAS Moy de l'Aisne (8)	0–4	US Chantilly (5)
31.	SC Moreuil (9)	3–2 (a.e.t.)	Union Sud Aisne FC (8)
32.	US Estrées-St Denis (8)	3–1	US Chevrières-Grandfresnoy (7)
33.	AFC Creil (7)	2–0	FC Centuloise (8)
34.	ESC Longueau (7)	3–2	SC Abbeville (6)
35.	AS St Sauveur (Oise) (9)	1–6	US Laon (6)
36.	AF Amiens (14)	0–6	US Meru Sandricourt (7)
37.	US Breteuil (7)	5–0	FC Raismes (8)
38.	AS Brebières (11)	0–1	US Nogent (6)
39.	Anzin FARC (10)	1–2	US Guignicourt (6)
40.	Olympique Onnaingeois (10)	1–3	RC Bohain (7)
41.	OSM Lomme (10)	0–1	AS Ste Barbe-Oignies (8)
42.	ES Enquin-les-Mines (9)	2–0	Mons AC (8)
43.	AS Cucq (9)	1–2 (a.e.t.)	US Gravelines (6)
44.	ES Calaisis Coulogne (8)	0–2	CS Avion (6)
45.	AS Dockers Dunkerque (10)	2–3	ASC Hazebrouck (8)
46.	FC Dunkerque-Malo Plage (7)	0–1	Wasquehal Football (6)
47.	ABC2F Candas (11)	0–3	Olympique Lumbrois (7)
48.	Calais Beau-Marais (9)	0–2	Arras Football Association (4)
49.	AFCL Liebaut (9)	4–1	AS Conchil-le-Temple (10)
50.	Amicale Pascal Calais (7)	1–0 (a.e.t.)	Olympique Grande-Synthe (5)
51.	US Abbeville (10)	0–1	Le Touquet AC (5)
52.	La Couture FC (11)	0–1	ES Oye-Plage (8)
53.	CS Diana Liévin (9)	1–4	Stade Portelois (6)
54.	ES Wormhout (9)	1–3	US Saint-Omer (6)
55.	JS Condette (10)	1–0	Olympique St Martin Boulogne (9)
56.	AS Outreau (7)	1–0	FC Tatinghem (8)
57.	AS Dunkerque Sud (8)	1–2	US Pays de Cassel (7)
58.	FC Loon-Plage (6)	0–1	Iris Club de Croix (4)
59.	Stella Lys (8)	3–0	ES Roncq (9)
60.	ES Caudry (9)	1–4	Feignies Aulnoye FC (4)
61.	US Berlaimont (10)	0–2	US Mineurs Waziers (6)
62.	Bruay Sports (9)	2–3	ES Lambresienne (7)
63.	ESM Hamel (12)	1–0	FC Quarouble (8)
64.	FA Neuvilloise (8)	2–1	IC Lambersart (8)
65.	Union Halluinoise (9)	0–2	Villeneuve-d'Ascq Métropole (7)
66.	US Vermelles (7)	1–2	US Maubeuge (5)
67.	US Escaudain (7)	2–2 (5–6 p)	Roubaix SC (7)
68.	CG Haubourdin (9)	0–1	US Lesquin (7)
69.	Colisée Vimaranense Roubaix (10)	0–5	Saint-Amand FC (6)
70.	FCP Blendecques (11)	0–3	AS Marck (6)
71.	Auchel FC (11)	0–2	Olympique Marcquois Football (5)
72.	FC Wardrecques (10)	3–1	ES Anzin-St Aubin (10)
73.	Stade Béthunois (6)	1–2	US Vimy (6)
74.	OS Annequin (9)	2–2 (0–3 p)	US Ascq (8)
75.	US Aulnoy (10)	0–1	CAS Escaudœuvres (7)
76.	ES Cagny (11)	0–3	US Portugais Roubaix Tourcoing (8)
77.	FJEP Fort Vert (10)	2–4	US Attin (8)

== Fifth round ==
These matches were played on 13 and 14 October 2018.

Fifth round results: Hauts-de-France
Tie no	Home team (tier)	Score	Away team (tier)
1.	Olympique Marcquois Football (5)	6–1	US Choisy-au-Bac (6)
2.	Carabiniers Billy-Montigny (8)	0–2	Château Thierry-Étampes FC (6)
3.	Internationale Soissonnaise (7)	0–4	Wasquehal Football (6)
4.	JS Bulles (12)	0–3	FC Bondues (8)
5.	AS du Pays Neslois (6)	3–0	Feignies Aulnoye FC (4)
6.	JS Condette (10)	1–4	US Tourcoing FC (5)
7.	FA Neuvilloise (8)	2–3	US Guignicourt (6)
8.	CAS Escaudœuvres (7)	0–0 (3–2 p)	RC Bohain (7)
9.	US Ascq (8)	1–3	ES Lambresienne (7)
10.	FC Provillois (10)	1–0	FC Santes (8)
11.	ESM Hamel (12)	1–0	FC Montigny-en-Gohelle (8)
12.	US Ailly-sur-Somme (6)	4–3	AFC Creil (7)
13.	US Gouvieux (9)	1–3	US Vimy (6)
14.	US Maubeuge (5)	2–2 (3–1 p)	USM Senlisienne (5)
15.	US Meru Sandricourt (7)	2–2 (4–3 p)	Villeneuve-d'Ascq Métropole (7)
16.	FC Béthisy (9)	1–0	US Balagny-St Epin (6)
17.	CS Avion (6)	2–2 (4–3 p)	US Lesquin (7)
18.	Roubaix SC (7)	5–0	US Estrées-St Denis (8)
19.	US Bruyères-et-Montbérault (9)	0–5	Olympique Saint-Quentin (5)
20.	Saint-Amand FC (6)	2–0	FC Porto Portugais Amiens (7)
21.	AS Beauvais Oise (5)	2–2 (2–4 p)	US Mineurs Waziers (6)
22.	AC Amiens (5)	1–1 (6–7 p)	US Gravelines (6)
23.	ES Oye-Plage (8)	1–5	US St Maximin (7)
24.	RC Amiens (7)	1–3	US Chantilly (5)
25.	RC Labourse (10)	1–2	ES Mouvalloise (8)
26.	SC Moreuil (9)	0–3	AFC Compiègne (6)
27.	US Nogent (6)	4–1 (a.e.t.)	AS Outreau (7)
28.	Stade Portugais St Quentin (9)	0–3	US Boulogne (3)
29.	AFCL Liebaut (9)	0–1 (a.e.t.)	ESC Longueau (7)
30.	Stade Portelois (6)	0–1	Amicale Pascal Calais (7)
31.	US Saint-Omer (6)	3–1	Le Touquet AC (5)
32.	US Attin (8)	1–3 (a.e.t.)	US Portugais Roubaix Tourcoing (8)
33.	US Breteuil (7)	0–3	USL Dunkerque (3)
34.	Olympique Lumbrois (7)	1–2	AS Marck (6)
35.	AS Beuvry-la-Forêt (9)	1–0	ES Enquin-les-Mines (9)
36.	US Pays de Cassel (7)	0–2 (a.e.t.)	Iris Club de Croix (4)
37.	FC Wardrecques (10)	0–3	AS Gamaches (6)
38.	ASC Hazebrouck (8)	4–1	US Laon (6)
39.	AS Ste Barbe-Oignies (8)	2–0	Stella Lys (8)
40.	FC Chambly (3)	3–1	Arras Football Association (4)

== Sixth round ==
These matches were played on 27 and 28 October 2018.

Sixth round results: Hauts-de-France
Tie no	Home team (tier)	Score	Away team (tier)
1.	FC Bondues (8)	1–2	US Nogent (6)
2.	AS Ste Barbe-Oignies (8)	1–3	Iris Club de Croix (4)
3.	US Gravelines (6)	2–1	US Guignicourt (6)
4.	ASC Hazebrouck (8)	6–3	US Ailly-sur-Somme (6)
5.	US Portugais Roubaix Tourcoing (8)	0–0 (3–4 p)	Olympique Saint-Quentin (5)
6.	FC Provillois (10)	0–1	US Saint-Omer (6)
7.	ESM Hamel (12)	0–1	US Vimy (6)
8.	CAS Escaudœuvres (7)	2–1	US Chantilly (5)
9.	US St Maximin (7)	1–1 (6–7 p)	AS Gamaches (6)
10.	AFC Compiègne (6)	3–2	Roubaix SC (7)
11.	ES Mouvalloise (8)	0–10	USL Dunkerque (3)
12.	FC Béthisy (9)	0–1	Wasquehal Football (6)
13.	Amicale Pascal Calais (7)	1–4	Olympique Marcquois Football (5)
14.	AS Beuvry-la-Forêt (9)	1–2	Saint-Amand FC (6)
15.	Château Thierry-Étampes FC (6)	0–0 (2–3 p)	CS Avion (6)
16.	AS Marck (6)	2–1	US Meru Sandricourt (7)
17.	ES Lambresienne (7)	1–2	ESC Longueau (7)
18.	US Mineurs Waziers (6)	1–4	US Boulogne (3)
19.	US Maubeuge (5)	1–2	FC Chambly (3)
20.	US Tourcoing FC (5)	1–3 (a.e.t.)	AS du Pays Neslois (6)
