= Axel Ranisch =

German actor, director and author

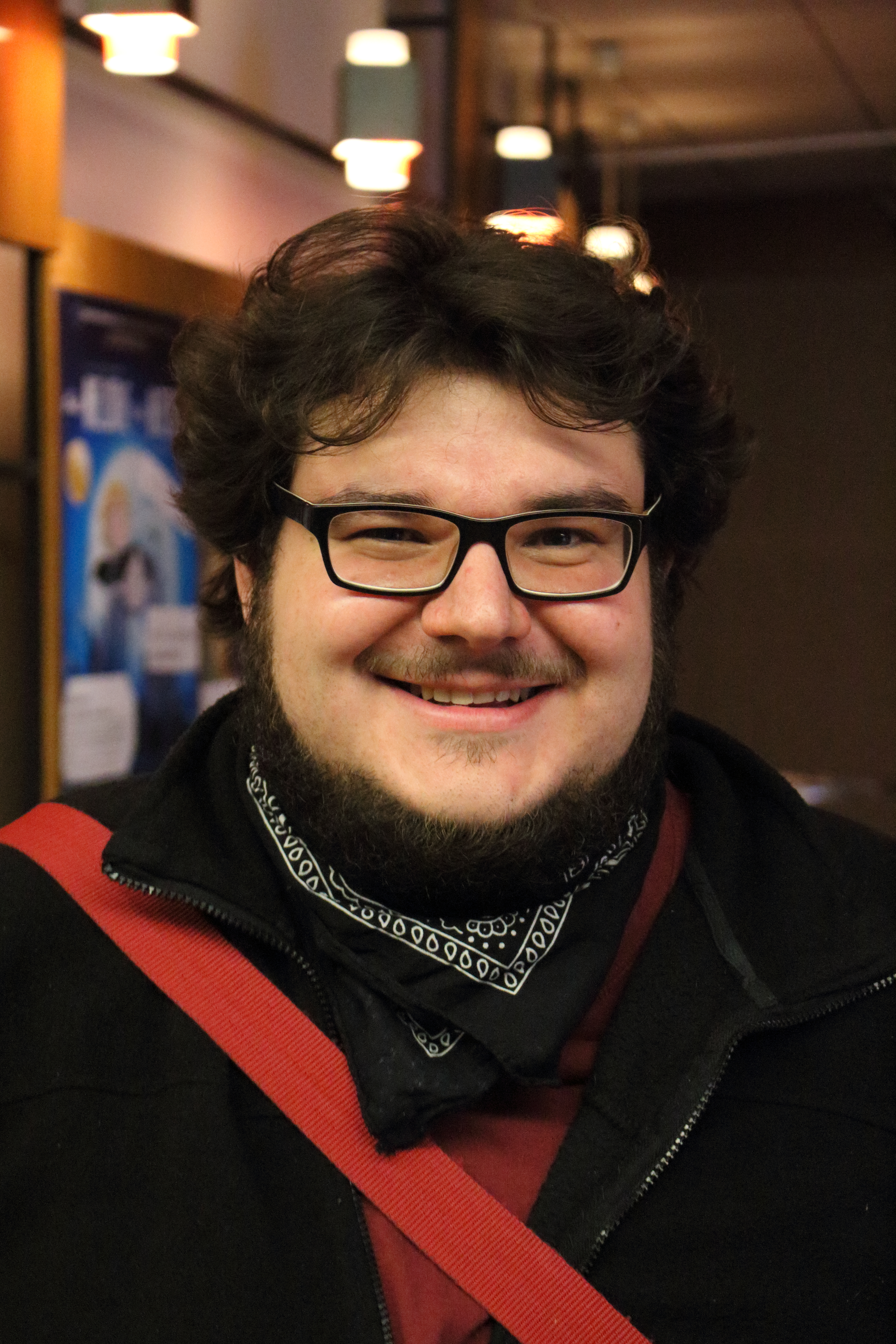
- Portrait of Axel Ranisch in 2016
- Born: 30 June 1983 (age 42); East Berlin, East Germany

Axel Ranisch (born 30 June 1983 in East Berlin) is a German actor, film and television director and author.

== Life ==
Ranisch spent his childhood in Berlin-Lichtenberg. He studied theatre pedagogy in Flecken Zechlin until 2004. From 2004 to 2011 Ranisch studied at Konrad Wolf Film University of Babelsberg. Ranisch works as a film and theatre director, and as an actor in different film, theatre and TV productions in Germany. Ranisch shot the film Pink Children (2012) with 4 other German directors about their mentor Rosa von Praunheim. In 2018, he published and authored the book Nackt über Berlin. In 2016, he married his partner Paul in Berlin.

== Filmography ==
=== Director ===
==== Short films ====
- 2004: Rhythmus im Kopf
- 2005: Hollbüllhuus
- 2008: Liebe Liebe…
- 2010: Diego Alonso

==== Cinema and television ====
- 2008: Der will nur spielen!
- 2008: Glioblastom
- 2011: Heavy Girls
- 2012: Pink Children
- 2013: I Feel Like Disco
- 2013: Reuber
- 2015: Alky Alky
- 2015: Löwenzahn
- 2016: Familie Lotzmann auf den Barrikaden
- 2016: Tatort: Babbeldasch (Lena Odenthal Tatort; SWR)
- 2017: Tatort: Waldlust (Lena Odenthal Tatort; SWR)
- 2018: Löwenzahn

=== Actor ===
==== Television ====
- 2007: Sechs tote Studenten (director: Rosa von Praunheim)
- 2009: Résiste – Aufstand der Praktikanten (director: Jonas Grosch)
- 2009: Meine Daten und ich (director: Philipp Eichholtz)
- 2011: Papa Gold (also editing) (director: Tom Lass)
- 2011: Wie man leben soll (director: David Schalko)
- 2012: Glory: A Tale of Mistaken Identities (director: Isabel Kleefeld)
- 2013: Axel und Peter – Titten für Arsch (director: Rosa von Praunheim)
- 2014: Zorn – Tod und Regen (1. Teil der Serie Zorn, director: Mark Schlichter)
- 2014: Liebe mich! (director: Philipp Eichholtz)
- 2015: Zorn – Vom Lieben und Sterben (director: Mark Schlichter)
- 2015: Zorn – Wo kein Licht (director Christoph Schnee)
- 2016: Zorn – Wie sie töten (director: Jochen Alexander Freydank)
- 2017: Zorn – Kalter Rauch (director: Andreas Herzog)
- 2017: Blind & Hässlich (director: Tom Lass)
- 2019: Familie Lotzmann auf den Barrikaden

==== Theatre ====
- 2009: A Clockwork Orange by Anthony Burgess at Brandenburger Jugendtheater, co-Regie, together with Christiane Ziehl
- 2013: The Bear by William Walton & La voix humaine from Francis Poulenc at Bayerischen Staatsoper (Spielstätte: Kino Theatiner Film)
- 2014: George (UA) Komische Oper in three acts, with a prolog and an epilog. music from Elena Kats-Chernin, libretto from Axel Ranisch, a production from Danya Segal and Theater für Niedersachsen in cooperation with Niedersächsische Musiktage and KunstFestSpiele Herrenhausen
- 2015: Pinocchio by Pierangelo Valtinoni at Bayerische Staatsoper (Reithalle)
- 2018: Konrad oder Das Kind aus der Konservenbüchse by Christine Nöstlinger at Theater an der Parkaue
- 2018: Orlando paladino from Joseph Haydn at Bayerischen Staatsoper (Prinzregententheater)
- 2018: Die Liebe zu drei Orangen from Sergei Prokofjew at Staatsoper Stuttgart
- 2019: Mavra from Igor Strawinsky & Jolanthe by Pjotr Iljitsch Tschaikowski at Bayerische Staatsoper (Cuvilliés-Theater)

=== Writer ===
- Nackt über Berlin, Ullstein fünf Verlag, Berlin 2018. 384 pages
