= Thunman =

Thunman is a Swedish surname. Notable people with this name are:

- Mattias Thunman Hälldahl (born 1993), Swedish ice hockey defenceman
- N. Ronald Thunman (born 1932), vice admiral in the United States Navy
- Sven Thunman (1920–2004), Swedish ice hockey defenceman
