= Robert Alexy =

German jurist (1945–2026)

- Born: 9 September 1945; Oldenburg, Free State of Oldenburg, Allied-occupied Germany
- Died: 5 September 2026 (aged 80)
- Education: University of Göttingen
- Awards: Order of Merit of the Federal Republic of Germany (2010)
- Scientific career
- Fields: Law
- Workplaces: Kiel University
- Doctoral advisor: Ralf Dreier
- Doctoral students: Mattias Kumm

Robert Alexy (9 September 1945 – 5 September 2026) was a German jurist and a legal philosopher, who taught at the Kiel University from 1986 to 2013, and also internationally. His books were translated into more than 20 languages. He held honorary doctorates from 14 universities in Europe and South America.

== Life and career ==
Alexy was born in Oldenburg on 9 September 1945. After three years of military service, he studied law and philosophy at the University of Göttingen from 1968, mostly philosophy with Günther Patzig. He completed the first Staatsexamen in 1973 and then worked on his dissertation, Theorie der juristischen Argumentation, which was supported by the Studienstiftung des deutschen Volkes and completed in 1976. Subsequently printed in 1978, this work earned him the Preis der Philologisch-Historischen Klasse from the Göttingen Academy of Sciences and Humanities. He completed his second Staatsexamen in 1978. He then worked until 1984 as an assistant to Ralf Dreier who held the seat of general theory of law. He completed his habilitation in public law and philosophy of law in 1984 with Theorie der Grundrechte (Theory of Constitutional Rights).

Alexy was a professor at the Kiel University from 1986 to 2013. International students came to Kiel to study with him. Some of his students were professors in São Paulo and other South American universities, in Tokyo and Seoul. By 2015, when he formally retired from Kiel University, his publications were translated in as many as 23 languages. In 2002 Alexy was appointed to the Academy of Sciences and Humanities at the University of Göttingen.

He was awarded the Order of Merit of the Federal Republic of Germany on 13 April 2010. He received the Kiel science prize for his lifetime achievements on 30 June 2013. Since 2008, the Universities of Alicante, Buenos Aires, Tucumán, Antwerp, National University of San Marcos in Lima, Prague, Coimbra, Porto Alegre, Belo Horizonte, Chapecó, Rio de Janeiro and Bogotá had awarded him honorary doctorate degrees.

Alexy died in Kiel on 5 September 2026, aged 80.

== Natural law theory ==
Alexy's definition of law looks like a mix of Kelsen's normativism (which was an influential version of legal positivism) and Radbruch's legal naturalism (Alexy, 2002), but Alexy's theory of argumentation (Alexy, 1983) puts him very close to legal interpretivism.

In The Argument From Injustice, Alexy defends Radbruch's formula that injust or evil laws only lose their legal validity when they deliberately disavow justice and equality. He formulated law's relationship to morality on three theses:

- The thesis of incorporation; each legal system contains principles.
- The moral thesis; law must be related to a common moral.
- The correctness thesis; law must be related to a just moral.

At the heart of his theory is the claim to correctness: Law must necessarily claim to be correct, no matter how corrupt, lest it be self-contradictory and fundamentally illogical. As law coerces behaviour and gives individuals decisive reasons for acting, the correctness it claims must also be moral.

== Publications ==
Alexy published more than 180 scientific works. They were translated into 23 languages.

His books include:

- Theorie der juristischen Argumentation. Die Theorie des rationalen Diskurses als Theorie der juristischen Begründung (Suhrkamp, 1983; first edition 1978) ISBN 3-518-28036-8.
  - Translated by Ruth Adler and Neil MacCormick as A Theory of Legal Argumentation: The Theory of Rational Discourse as Theory of Legal Justification (Clarendon, 1989) ISBN 978-0-19-958422-2
- Theorie der Grundrechte (Suhrkamp, 1985; second edition 1994) ISBN 3-518-28182-8.
  - Translated by Julian Rivers as A Theory of Constitutional Rights (Oxford University Press, 2002) ISBN 978-0-19-825821-6
- Mauerschützen (Vandenhoeck + Ruprecht, 1993) ISBN 3-525-86282-2
- Recht, Vernunft, Diskurs (Suhrkamp, 1995) ISBN 3-518-28767-2
- Der Beschluß des Bundesverfassungsgerichts zu den Tötungen an der innerdeutschen Grenze vom 24. Oktober 1996 (Vandenhoeck & Ruprecht, 1997) ISBN 3-525-86293-8
- Begriff und Geltung des Rechts (Karl Alber, 1992) ISBN 978-3-495-49075-4
  - Translated by Stanley Paulson and Bonnie Litschewski Paulson as The Argument from Injustice: A Reply to Legal Positivism (Oxford University Press, 2002) ISBN 978-0-19-958421-5
- Elemente einer juristischen Begründungslehre, co-edited with Hans-Joachim Koch, Lothar Kuhlen and Helmut Rüßmann (Nomos, 2003) ISBN 3-7890-8397-6
