= Reuber =

Reuber is a surname. It may refer to:

- Alan Reuber (born 1981), American football player
- Grant Reuber (1927-2018), Canadian businessman and economist
- Matthias Reuber (born 1992), German politician
