= Mattias Kumm =

American philosopher (born 1967)

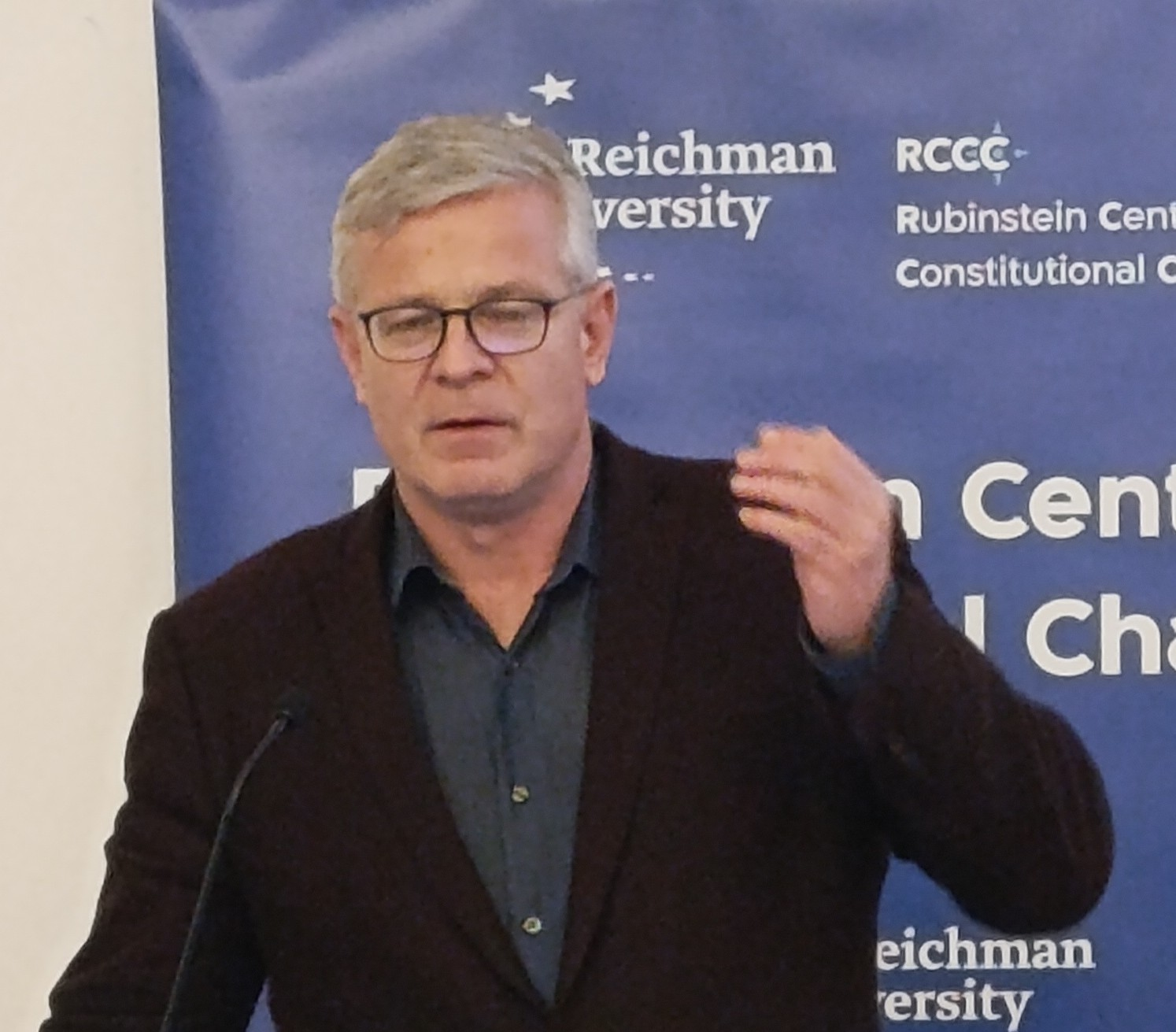
- Mattias Kumm, December 2025
- Born: August 15, 1967 (age 58); Bremen, Germany

Philosophical work
- Era: 20th/21st-century philosophy
- Region: Western philosophy
- School: Jurisprudence, political philosophy

Mattias Kumm (born August 15, 1967) is Inge Rennert Professor of Law at New York University School of Law, as well as holding a Research Professorship on "Globalization and the Rule of Law" at the Social Science Research Center (Wissenschaftszentrum Berlin für Sozialforschung, WZB) and Humboldt University in Berlin.

He was born in Bremen, Germany and has taught and lectured at leading universities worldwide and was a visiting professor and John Harvey Gregory Lecturer on world organization at Harvard Law School. Kumm holds a JSD from Harvard Law School and has pursued studies in law, philosophy and political sciences at the University of Kiel, Paris I Pantheon Sorbonne and Harvard University. Kumm is on the editorial board of several journals.

Kumm's research and teaching focuses on basic issues in global, European and comparative public law. His work emphasizes the analytical and normative connection between law, claims to legitimate authority and public reason and the institutional conditions under which such claims can be made plausible. He argues for the need to reconceive the liberal-democratic constitutional tradition in cosmopolitan and pluralist terms. Among his intellectual influences are Hans Kelsen, Robert Alexy, and Ronald Dworkin.

Kumm lives and works in New York City and Berlin.
