= Mattias Vegnaduzzo =

Argentine footballer

Personal information
- Date of birth: September 15, 1983 (age 43)
- Place of birth: San Isidro, Argentina
- Position: Striker

Senior career*
| Years | Team | Apps | (Gls) |
| 2000–2001 | Platense | ? | (?) |
| 2001–2003 | Chacarita Juniors | ? | (?) |
| 2003–2005 | Huracán | ? | (?) |
| 2005–2006 | Colorado Rapids | 0 | (0) |
| 2007–2008 | Acassuso | 25 | (3) |
| 2008–2009 | AC Voghera | 33 | (15) |
| 2009–2010 | Rossanese | 31 | (18) |
| 2010–2011 | Gela | 10 | (0) |
| 2011 | Casale | 14 | (2) |
| 2011 | Pomigliano | 2 | (0) |
| 2011–2013 | Viterbese | 52 | (33) |
| 2013–2014 | Ascoli | 8 | (2) |
| 2014 | Viterbese | 14 | (9) |
| 2014–2015 | Foligno | 30 | (12) |
| 2015 | Virtus Flaminia | 10 | (5) |
| 2015–2016 | Viterbese | 4 | (0) |
| 2016–2017 | Civitavecchia | ? | (14) |
| 2017–2018 | Grosseto | 0 | (0) |
| 2018–2019 | Varese | 15 | (3) |
- * Club domestic league appearances and goals as of 21 November 2017

Mattias Vegnaduzzo (born 5 October 1983) is an Argentine footballer.

== Club career ==
Vegnaduzzo suffered a knee injury in early 2005, which prevented him from playing in the Argentine Primera with Club Atlético Huracán.

Vegnaduzzo scored 3 goals in 25 appearances for Club Atlético Acassuso in Argentina's Primera B Metropolitana during the 2007–08 season .

On 22 July 2017, he joined to Grosseto.

On 6 August 2018, he signed for .
