= US Chantilly =

French football club

Chantilly
- Full name: Union Sportive de Chantilly
- Founded: 1902
- Ground: Stade des Bourgognes
- Capacity: 2,400
- Chairman: Pascal Cocuelle
- Coach: Dominique Garat
- League: National 3 Group G
- 2022–23: National 3 Group I, 9th
- Website: uschantilly.footeo.com
Home colours

Union Sportive de Chantilly is a football club from Chantilly, Oise, France. It was founded in 1902 and, as of the 2020–21 season, plays in the Championnat National 3, the fifth tier of French football. The club won promotion from the sixth tier at the first attempt, after previously being relegated from the Championnat National 3 in 2019.

== Current squad ==
Note: Flags indicate national team as defined under FIFA eligibility rules; some limited exceptions apply. Players may hold more than one non-FIFA nationality.

No.	Pos.	Nation	Player
1	GK	BEL	Corentin Michel
2	DF	FRA	Matias Ferreira
3	DF	CPV	Mauricio Gonçalves
4	DF	FRA	Souleymane Coulibaly
5	DF	GBS	Adon Gomis
6	MF	FRA	Mouhamed Sadjo
7	FW	FRA	Evens Joseph
9	FW	FRA	Dramane Koné
10	FW	FRA	Oumar N'Diaye
11	FW	FRA	Ismail Karamoko
12	MF	MLI	Nianankoro Doumbia

No.	Pos.	Nation	Player
13	MF	CIV	Serge N'Guessan
15	FW	FRA	Cerene Traoré
16	GK	FRA	Marvin Golitin
17	DF	COM	Mohamed Youssouf
18	MF	FRA	Alan Issifou
19	FW	FRA	Yacine Boucharoud
20	DF	FRA	Mahamadou Sissoko
22	DF	GUI	Ernest Seka
24	DF	FRA	Xavier Decroix
27	DF	FRA	Harouna Sy

== Notable players ==
- (France) Mohamed-Ali Cho (youth)
- (France) Valentin Gendrey (youth)
- (France) Clément Lenglet (youth)
- (Cameroon) Christopher Wooh (youth)
