= Mathias Olsson =

Swedish ice hockey player

- Born: 23 April 1973 (age 52) Tingsryd, Sweden
- Height: 6 ft 6 in (198 cm)
- Weight: 243 lb (110 kg; 17 st 5 lb)
- Position: Defence
- Shot: Left
- Played for: Leksands IF
- NHL draft: Undrafted
- Playing career: 1993–2008

Mathias Olsson (born 23 April 1973) is a Swedish former professional ice hockey defenceman. He played 37 games in the Elitserien with Leksands IF during the 1996–97 season.

== Career statistics ==
			Regular season					Playoffs
Season	Team	League	GP	G	A	Pts	PIM	GP	G	A	Pts	PIM
1989–90	Tingsryds AIF J18		—	—	—	—	—	—	—	—	—	—
1989–90	Tingsryds AIF J20	J20 Div.1	—	—	—	—	—	—	—	—	—	—
1989–90	Tingsryds AIF	Division 2	1	0	0	0	0	—	—	—	—	—
1990–91	Tingsryds AIF U18		—	—	—	—	—	—	—	—	—	—
1990–91	Tingsryds AIF J20	J20 Div.1	—	—	—	—	—	—	—	—	—	—
1990–91	Tingsryds AIF	Division 2	9	1	3	4	0	—	—	—	—	—
1991–92	Tingsryds AIF J20	J20 Div.1	—	—	—	—	—	—	—	—	—	—
1991–92	Tingsryds AIF	Division 2	32	0	2	2	16	—	—	—	—	—
1992–93	Tingsryds AIF	Division 2	32	4	12	16	52	—	—	—	—	—
1993–94	Tingsryds AIF	Division 1	32	4	6	10	58	5	0	1	1	8
1994–95	Tingsryds AIF	Division 1	29	4	8	12	30	7	0	2	2	8
1995–96	Tingsryds AIF	Division 1	32	2	5	7	55	—	—	—	—	—
1996–97	Leksands IF J20	J20 SuperElit	4	1	0	1	2	—	—	—	—	—
1996–97	Leksands IF	Elitserien	37	1	0	1	12	—	—	—	—	—
1996–97	Falu IF	Division 1	7	1	1	2	12	—	—	—	—	—
1997–98	IK Oskarshamn	Division 1	27	1	2	3	46	—	—	—	—	—
1998–99	IK Oskarshamn	Division 1	36	4	8	12	59	—	—	—	—	—
1999–00	IK Oskarshamn	Allsvenskan	46	6	4	10	65	2	0	0	0	2
2000–01	IK Oskarshamn	Allsvenskan	41	13	10	23	55	10	0	1	1	10
2001–02	IK Oskarshamn	Allsvenskan	39	6	4	10	44	—	—	—	—	—
2002–03	IK Oskarshamn	Allsvenskan	42	4	5	9	38	—	—	—	—	—
2003–04	Växjö Lakers HC	Allsvenskan	43	1	2	3	40	5	0	0	0	6
2004–05	Växjö Lakers HC	Allsvenskan	42	0	1	1	34	2	0	0	0	2
2005–06	Örebro HK	Division 1	29	9	4	13	32	5	0	0	0	10
2006–07	Örebro HK	Division 1	39	2	6	8	44	2	0	0	0	2
2007–08	Lindlövens IF	Division 1	25	1	4	5	24	—	—	—	—	—
Elitserien totals			37	1	0	1	12	—	—	—	—	—
Allsvenskan totals			253	30	26	56	276	19	0	1	1	20
Division 1 totals			256	28	44	72	360	19	0	3	3	28
