= Justice Matthias =

Justice Matthias may refer to:

- Edward S. Matthias (1873–1953), associate justice of the Ohio Supreme Court
- John M. Matthias (1903–1973), associate justice of the Ohio Supreme Court
