= Matías Draghi =

Argentine footballer (born 1993)

Personal information
- Full name: Matías Nicolás Draghi
- Date of birth: 22 March 1993 (age 33)
- Place of birth: San Rafael, Argentina
- Height: 1.90 m (6 ft 3 in)
- Position: Goalkeeper

Team information
- Current team: Isernia

Youth career
- Godoy Cruz

Senior career*
Years	Team	Apps	(Gls)
2012–2013	San Telmo	3	(0)
2013–2014	Puerto Nuevo	15	(0)
2015	Independiente Rivadavia	0	(0)
2016	Reus	0	(0)
2016–2017	Gavà	0	(0)
2017–2018	Venados	8	(0)
2018–2019	Independiente Rivadavia		
2019	Deportivo Mixco		
2019–2020	Venados		
2020	Estudiantes de Mérida	8	(0)
2020–2021	Independiente Rivadavia		
2021	Trinidense		
2022–2023	Cristóbal Colón		
2022	→ Deportivo Santaní (loan)		
2023–2024	12 de Octubre SD		
2024	Deportivo Rincón	15	(0)
2024–	Isernia	10	(0)
- * Club domestic league appearances and goals as of 10 November 2024

Matías Nicolás Draghi (born 22 March 1993) is an Argentine footballer who plays as a goalkeeper for Italian Serie D club Isernia.

== Career ==
In early January 2019, Draghi joined Sport Club Pacífico in Argentina. On 10 October 2019, Draghi was announced as a new player of Deportivo Mixco in Guatemala. However, at the end of the same month, it was reported that the official transfer could not be completed since the club never received the transfer formula.
