= Matias Niuta =

Finnish footballer (born 2001)

Personal information
- Date of birth: 9 March 2001 (age 25)
- Place of birth: Finland
- Height: 1.70 m (5 ft 7 in)
- Position: Midfielder

Team information
- Current team: FC Reipas
- Number: 20

Youth career
- FC Lahti

Senior career*
Years	Team	Apps	(Gls)
2018–2020	FC Lahti	1	(0)
2019	→ FC Reipas (loan)	5	(0)
2019	→ NJS (loan)	5	(0)
2020–	FC Reipas	14	(0)
- * Club domestic league appearances and goals as of 23 October 2021

Matias Niuta (born 9 March 2001) is a Finnish professional footballer who plays for FC Reipas as a midfielder.
