= Mattias Saari =

Swedish ice hockey player

- Born: September 15, 1994 (age 31) Sundsvall, Sweden
- Height: 5 ft 11 in (180 cm)
- Weight: 196 lb (89 kg; 14 st 0 lb)
- Position: Forward
- Shot: Left
- Played for: Timrå IK, Vallentuna BK
- Playing career: 2013–2017

Mattias Saari (born September 15, 1994) is a retired Swedish ice hockey player. He played with Vallentuna BK and Timrå IK of the Swedish Hockey League (SHL).

Saari made his Elitserien (now the SHL) debut playing with Timrå IK during the 2012–13 Elitserien playoffs.
