= Matias Ferreira =

Portuguese footballer (born 1997)

Matías Ferreira
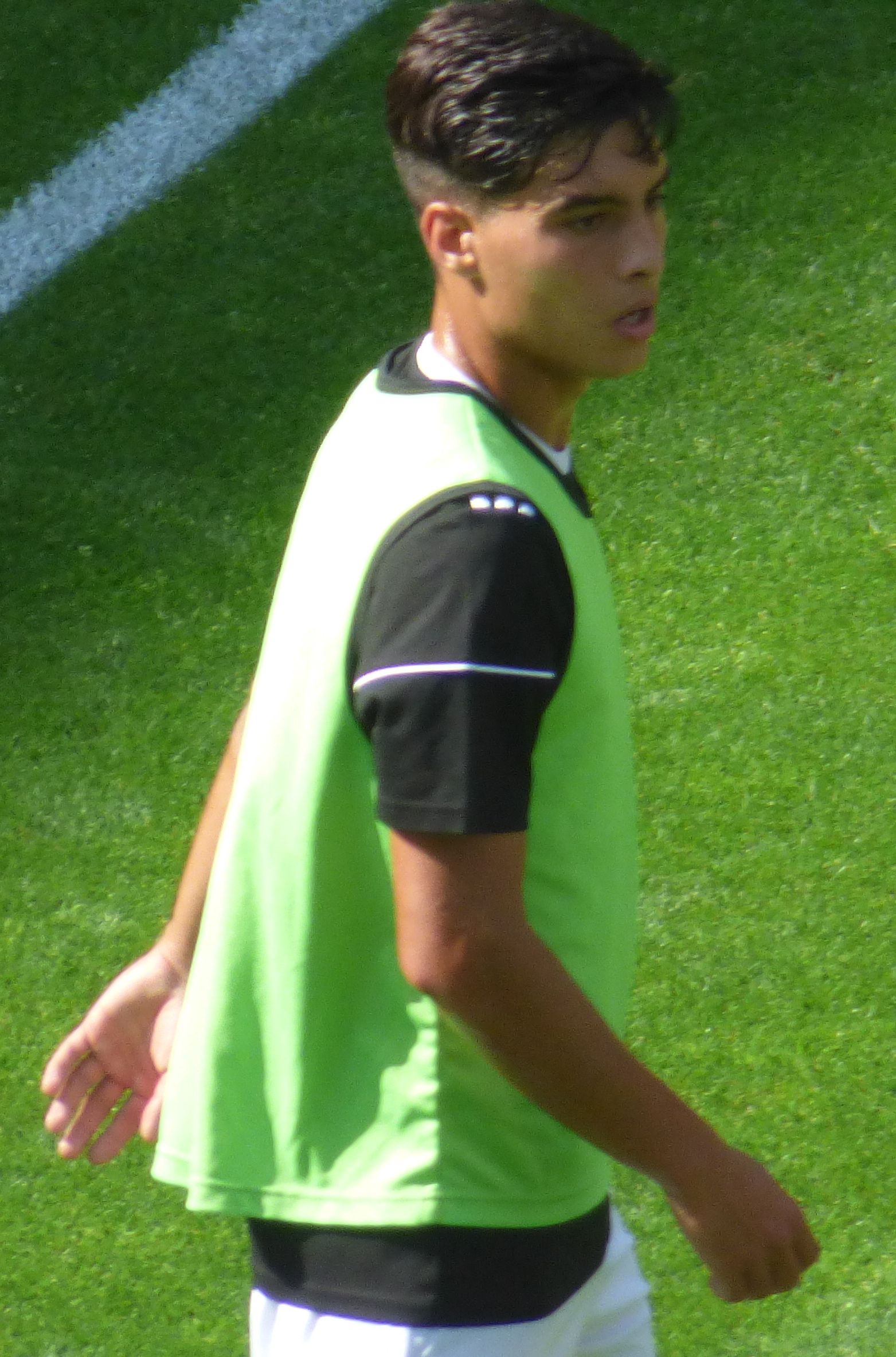
- Ferreira in 2018

Personal information
- Date of birth: 1 January 1997 (age 29)
- Place of birth: Les Lilas, France
- Height: 1.73 m (5 ft 8 in)
- Position: Right-back

Team information
- Current team: US Chantilly
- Number: 2

Youth career
- 2004–2012: Red Star
- 2012–2015: Sochaux

Senior career*
| Years | Team | Apps | (Gls) |
| 2015 | Sochaux II | 2 | (0) |
| 2015–2016 | Paços Ferreira | 0 | (0) |
| 2016–2017 | Red Star II | | |
| 2017–2020 | Red Star | 31 | (0) |
| 2020–2021 | Bourges 18 | | |
| 2021–2022 | Andrézieux | 21 | (0) |
| 2022–2024 | Ouest Tourangeau | 39 | (2) |
| 2024–2025 | Villers Houlgate CF | 12 | (0) |
| 2025- | US Chantilly | | |
- * Club domestic league appearances and goals as of 1 October 2026

Matías Ferreira (born 1 January 1997) is a Portuguese professional footballer who plays as a right-back for French club US Chantilly.

== Club career ==
On 27 July 2018, Ferreira made his professional debut with Red Star in a 2018–19 Ligue 2 match against Chamois Niortais.

== International career ==
Born in France, Ferreira is of Portuguese descent. He was called up to a training camp for the Portugal U18s in October 2014.
