= Ronald Mathias =

Welsh trade union leader

Ronald Cavill Mathias OBE (1912–1968) was a Welsh trade union leader.

== Personal life ==
Mathias was born on 21 September 1912 at Pontarddulais, Swansea, Wales. He attended Gowerton Grammar School. In 1938 he married Annie Ceridwen Hall and they had one daughter. He died on 15 April 1968 on a Mediterranean cruise and was buried at sea.

== Career ==
Mathias began his career as a clerk in 1924 for the Richard Thomas Co south Wales iron and steel manufacturers. In 1945, Mathias became organiser for the Transport and General Workers' Union in Merthyr and the district. We worked as Cardiff district organiser 1949–53 and South Wales Regional Secretary 1953–67. Though he retired in 1967, he was that year made full-time member of the National Board for Prices and Incomes.

Ronald Mathias was an active member of public life, holding the public office of Vice-Chairman of the Welsh Economic Council, secretary of the South Wales T.U.C. Advisory Committee, treasurer of the Welsh Council of Labour, and governor of the Welsh College for Advanced Technology. In 1965, he was appointed chairman of the Welsh Labour Party. In 1958 he received a MBE and received an OBE in 1967.

== Academic career ==
Mathias lectured on economics and industry and was thought to be a popular lecturer. He also published articles in journals relating to this matter.
