= Matthias Reuber =

German politician (born 1992)

Member of the Landtag of Rhineland-Palatinate
- Incumbent
- Assumed office 18 May 2021
- Preceded by: Peter Enders
- Constituency: Altenkirchen (Westerwald)

Personal details
- Born: 1 August 1992 (age 33)
- Party: Christian Democratic Union

Matthias Reuber (born 1 August 1992) is a German politician serving as a member of the Landtag of Rhineland-Palatinate since 2021. He has served as chairman of the Christian Democratic Union in Birken-Honigsessen since 2019.
