= Mathias (disambiguation) =

Mathias is a given name and a surname.

Mathias may also refer to:

- Mathias Baronetcy, a former title in the Baronetage of the United Kingdom
- Mathias Point, a point on Montagu Island, South Sandwich Islands
- Mathias Township, Michigan, United States
- Mathias, West Virginia, United States

== See also ==
- Matthew (given name)#Variations
