= Mattias Thunman Hälldahl =

Swedish ice hockey player

- Born: September 7, 1993 (age 32) Sweden
- Height: 5 ft 10 in (178 cm)
- Weight: 172 lb (78 kg; 12 st 4 lb)
- Position: Defence
- Shoots: Left
- SHL team: Timrå IK
- Playing career: 2013–present

Mattias Thunman Hälldahl (born September 7, 1993) is a Swedish ice hockey defenceman. He is currently playing with Timrå IK of the Swedish Hockey League (SHL).

Thunman-Halldahl made his Elitserien (now the SHL) debut playing with Timrå IK during the 2012–13 Elitserien season.
