= Matias Putkonen =

Finnish politician and priest (1822–1868)

Matias Putkonen (4 March 1822, in Kerimäki – 26 February 1868, in Tuusula) was a Finnish Lutheran priest and politician. He studied theology at the University of Helsinki and was ordained a priest of the Evangelical Lutheran Church of Finland in 1848. Putkonen worked as a parish priest in Jaakkima from 1848 to 1855 and in Tuusula from 1855 until his death in 1868. He was elected Member of the Diet of Finland in 1867.
