= Macura =

Macura (Czech feminine: Macurová, Polish archaic feminines: Macurzyna, Macurzanka) is a Slavic surname. It Polish it is derived from the given name Mac, a short form of Maciej and Mateusz. In Czech, the name was derived from Máca, which is a pet form of the given name Matěj (Czech form of Matthias/Matthew). Notable people with the surname include:

- Jana Macurová (born 1978), Czech tennis player
- J. P. Macura (born 1995), American basketball player
- Jurij Macura (born 1999), Slovenian basketball player
- Sasa Macura (born 1991), Australian-Croatian footballer
- Slobodan Macura Bondo (1918–1943), Croatian partisan
- Tatjana Macura (born 1981), Serbian politician

== See also ==
- Macur
- Mazura
