= Matevž (given name) =

- Pronunciation: Slovene pronunciation: [matɛ̀ːu̯ʃ]
- Gender: male
- Language: Slovenian

Origin
- Derivation: from the Greek name Matthias
- Region of origin: Slovenia

Other names
- Related names: Matej, Matija, Mateja, Matic, Matei, Maciej, Mateusz, Matthew, Matthias, Mathias, Matias

Matevž is a Slovenian given name. It is the Slovenian form of the name Matthew.

== Notable people with the name ==
- Matevž Fran Beer, 18th-century Slovenian politician, mayor of Ljubljana
- Matevž Frang, 16th-century Slovenian politician, mayor of Ljubljana
- Matevž Govekar (born 2000), Slovenian racing cyclist
- Matevž Kordež (1919–1992), Slovenian cross-country skier
- Matevž Kos (born 1966), Slovenian literary historian and essayist
- Matevž Lenarčič (born 1959), Slovenian light aircraft pilot and alpinist
- Matevž Lukanc (1926–2002), Slovenian alpine skier
- Matevž Skok (born 1986), Slovenian handball player
- Matevž Vidovšek (born 1999), Slovenian professional footballer

== See also ==
- Matevž, Slovenian national dish
- Matej
