= Mate =

Mate may refer to:

== Science ==
- Mate, one of a pair of animals involved in:
  - Mate choice, intersexual selection
    - Mate choice in humans
  - Mating
- Multi-antimicrobial extrusion protein, or MATE, an efflux transporter family of proteins

== Person or title ==
- Friendship
  - Mateship
- Mate (naval officer)
  - Chief mate, also known as first mate
  - Second mate
  - Third mate
- Third (curling), also known as a vice, vice-skip, or mate, the team member who delivers the second-to-last pair of a team's stones in an end

== People ==
=== Given names ===
- Mate (given name)
- Máté (given name)

=== Surname ===
- Máté (surname)

== Beverages ==
- Mate (drink), made from the yerba mate plant
  - Mate, a traditional South American container carved from a dried calabash
- Mate de coca, or coca tea

== Technology ==
- MATE (desktop environment), a fork of GNOME 2 (desktop shell for desktop hardware)
- Mate or mating condition, a synonym for constraints used in computer-aided design (CAD)
- Huawei Mate series, a smartphone series by the Chinese company Huawei

== Other uses ==
- Mate (horse), an American Thoroughbred racehorse
- Mate (2019 film), a South Korean film
- Mahte or Māte, epithet for goddesses in Latvian mythology
- "Mate", shortened from checkmate, a winning/losing situation in chess
- "Mate", the Ulster-scots word for food
- Yerba mate, a plant native to South America
- Mate (company), company manufacturing magnetic and functional composite compounds

== Acronyms ==
- Marine Academy of Technology and Environmental Science, or MATES, a high school in Manahawkin, New Jersey

== See also ==
- Inmate, a prisoner
- Mates, a surname
- Matte (disambiguation)
- Running mate, a fellow candidate for the same party in one election
