= Matic (given name) =

- Pronunciation: Slovene pronunciation: [matíːt͡s]
- Gender: male
- Language: Slovenian

Origin
- Derivation: from the name Matthias

Other names
- Related names: Matej, Matěj, Maciej, Mateja, Matija, Matevž, Matthias, Matthew

Matic is a Slovenian masculine given name, a variant of the name Matthias.

== Notable people with the name ==
- Matic Črnic (born 1992), Slovenian footballer
- Matic Fink (born 1990), Slovenian footballer
- Matic Ian Guček (born 2003), Slovenian hurdler
- Matic Ivačič (born 1993), Slovenian motorcycle speedway rider
- Matic Kotnik (born 1990), Slovenian footballer
- Matic Lavrenčič (born 2008), Slovenian chess player
- Matic Maruško (born 1990), Slovenian footballer
- Matic Osovnikar (born 1980), Slovenian sprinter
- Matic Paljk (born 1997), Slovenian footballer
- Matic Podlipnik (born 1992), Slovenian hockey player
- Matic Rebec (born 1995), Slovenian basketball player
- Matic Reja (born 1995), Slovenian footballer
- Matic Seferović (born 1986), Slovenian footballer
- Matic Sirnik (born 1991), Slovenian basketball player
- Matic Skube (born 1988), Slovenian alpine skier
- Matic Špec (born 1995), Slovenian tennis player
- Matic Suholežnik (born 1995), Slovenian handball player
- Matic Šušteršič (1980–2025), Slovenian sprinter
- Matic Verdinek (born 1994), Slovenian handball player
- Matic Žitko (born 1990), Slovenian footballer

== See also ==
- Matić, Serbian and Croatian surname
