= Mateja =

- Gender: male, female
- Language: Slovenian, Croatian, Serbian

Origin
- Derivation: from the Greek name Matthias

Other names
- Related names: Matea, Matej, Matija, Matevž, Matic, Matei, Maciej, Mateusz, Matthew, Matthias, Mathias, Matias

Mateja (Serbian: Матеја) is a South Slavic given name, a variant of the Greek given name Matthias (Matthew in English).

In Serbian, the name Mateja is masculine, while in Croatian and Slovene, it is feminine.

== Notable people with the name ==
=== Given name ===
- Mateja Andrlić (born 1993), Croatian footballer
- Mateja Bačanin (born 2003), Serbian footballer
- Mateja Čalušić (born 1987), Slovenian politician
- Mateja Đorđević (born 2003), Serbian footballer
- Mateja Jeger (born 1995), Croatian table tennis player
- Mateja Kežman (born 1979), Serbian footballer and sports agent
- Mateja Kraljevic (born 1993), Swiss tennis player
- Mateja Maslarević (born 2000), Serbian footballer
- Mateja Matejić (1924–2018), Serbian-American Orthodox priest and writer
- Mateja Matevski (1929–2018), Macedonian poet, literary critic and essayist
- Mateja Milovanović (born 2004), Serbian-Dutch footballer
- Mateja Nenadović (1777–1854), Serbian priest and politician
- Mateja Petronijević (born 1986), Croatian sailor
- Mateja Pintar (born 1985), Slovenian table tennis player
- Mateja Robnik (born 1987), Slovenian alpine skier
- Mateja Šimic (born 1980), Slovenian triathlete
- Mateja Stjepanović (born 2004), Serbian footballer
- Mateja Svet (born 1968), Slovenian alpine skier
- Mateja Vraničar Erman (born 1965), Slovenian politician
- Mateja Zver (born 1988), Slovenian footballer

=== Surname ===
- Andrzej Mateja (1935–2019), Polish cross-country skier
- Robert Mateja (born 1974), Polish ski jumper

== See also ==
- Matej
- Matea
- Matija
- Matejić (surname)
