= Matic =

Matic may refer to:

- Matić, Serbian and Croatian surname
- Matic (given name), Slovene masculine name
- Matic (album), an album by the Filipino band Cambio
- Matic, a former name for Polygon (blockchain)

== See also ==
- -matic, a suffix in English words referring to automatic
