= Mateo (given name) =

Mateo is a masculine given name, a form of Matthew used in Spanish and Croatian, similar to the Italian form Matteo. Notable people with the name include:

- Mateo souliere 2015
- Master Mateo (c. 1150–c. 1200/1217), sculptor and architect who worked in the Iberian Peninsula
- Mateo Aimerich (1715–1799), Spanish philologist
- Mateo Alemán (1547–1615?), Spanish novelist and writer
- Mateo Bertoša (born 1988), Croatian footballer
- Mateo Cañellas (born 1972), Spanish middle distance runner and politician, known as Mateu Cañellas
- Mateo A. T. Caparas (1923–2020), Filipino lawyer
- Mateo Cassierra (born 1997), Colombian football striker
- Mateo Castellano (born 1996), Argentine football midfielder
- Mateo Chiarino, Uruguayan actor and writer
- Mateo Corbo (born 1976), Uruguayan footballer
- Mateo Correa Magallanes (1866–1927), Mexican Roman Catholic priest and martyr
- Mateo de Angulo (born 1990), Colombian swimmer
- Mateo de Toro Zambrano, 1st Count of La Conquista (1727–1811), Royal Governor of Chile
- Mateo de Sagade de Bugueyro (1605–1672), Spanish Roman Catholic prelate
- Mateo Delmastro (born 2000), Argentine badminton player
- Mateo Elías Nieves Castillo (1882–1928), Mexican Roman Catholic priest
- Mateo Flecha el Joven (c. 1530–1604), Spanish composer
- Mateo Flecha (1481–1553), composer born in Kingdom of Aragon
- Mateo Flores (1922–2011), Guatemalan long-distance runner
- Mateo Flores (born 2004), Spanish footballer
- Mateo Frazier (born 1977), American writer, director, and producer
- Mateo García (born 1996), Argentine footballer
- Mateo Gil (born 1972), Spanish film director, screenwriter, and cinematographer
- Mateo Gil (conquistador), Spanish conquistador, Alcalde and Regidor of Santa Fe, Argentina during the Viceroyalty of Peru
- Mateo González Manrique, Spanish soldier and colonial governor of West Florida between 1813 and 1815
- Mateo Gucci (c. 1500 – c. 1550), Polish-Italian Renaissance architect and sculptor
- Mateo Guez, French-Canadian director, writer, photographer and producer
- Mateo Hasa (born 1993), Albanian football player
- Mateo Hrvatin (born 1980), Croatian handballer
- Mateo Jover, Bronze Wolf Award recipient
- Mateo Leal de Ayala (1560–1627), Spanish noblemen, mayor, and governor
- Mateo Malupo (born 1988), Tongan rugby union player
- José Manuel Mateo (born 1975), Spanish football defender
- Mateo Martinic (born 1931), Chilean historian, politician and lawyer
- Matéo Maximoff (1917–1999), French writer and Evangelical pastor of Romani ethnicity
- Mateo Messina (born 1972), American composer
- Mateo Míguez Adán (born 1987), Spanish footballer
- Matéo Mornar (born 1946), French sculptor of contemporary art
- Mateo Morrison (born 1946), Dominican writer, lawyer, poet and essayist
- Mateo Musacchio (born 1990), Argentine professional footballer
- Mateo Pavlović (born 1990), Croatian football defender
- Mateo Pinello (died 1569), Roman Catholic prelate who served as Bishop of Cuzco (1565–1569)
- Mateo Poljak (born 1989), Croatian footballer
- Mateo Pumacahua (1740–1815), Peruvian revolutionary
- Mateo Qares, Tanzanian politician, cabinet minister and member of Parliament for Babati constituency
- Mateo Restrepo (born 1997), Canadian soccer player
- Mateo Romero (artist) (born 1966), Native American painter
- Mateo Romero (composer) (c. 1575–1647), Belgian-born Spanish composer of Baroque music
- Mateo Rosas de Oquendo (c. 1559–1612), Peruvian satirist
- Mateo Roskam (born 1987), Croatian footballer
- Mateo Sanguinetti (born 1992), Uruguayan rugby union player
- Mateo Sanz Lanz (born 1993), Swiss sailor
- Mateo Silić (born 1984), Croatian footballer
- Mateo Sušić (born 1990), Bosnian football midfielder
- Mateo Túnez (born 1989), Spanish motorcycle road racer
- Mateo Vidal (1780–1855), Uruguayan priest and politician
- Mateo Zefi (born 1994), Albanian football player
- Mateo Žugec (born 2002), Croatian artistic gymnast

== Fictional characters ==
- Mateo Liwanag, on Superstore
- Mateo Santos, on All My Children
- Mateo Solano Villanueva, on The CW's Jane the Virgin
- Mateo Torrez, in the novel They Both Die at the End

== See also ==
- Matea
- Mateo (disambiguation)
- Mateo (surname)
