= Matić =

Matić (Serbian Cyrillic: Матић, Serbo-Croatian pronunciation: [mǎːtitɕ]) is a common Croatian and Serbian surname. It is a patronymic name of Mate, the Croatian, or Matija, both Croatian and Serbian variants of the Latin name Mathaeus, English Matthew. According to Croatian genealogy, the surname Matić is typical of Croat ethnicity, but it is carried by Serbian and Bosnian people as well.

Matić is the most common surname in the Dubrovnik-Neretva County in Croatia, and among the most frequent ones in another three counties.

Notable people with the name include:

- Aleksa Matić (born 2002), Serbian footballer
- Barbara Matić (born 1994), Croatian judoka
- Bernardo Matić (born 1994), Croatian footballer
- Bojan Matić (born 1991), Serbian footballer
- Boris T. Matić (born 1966), Croatian film producer
- Boris Matić (footballer) (born 2004), Serbian footballer
- Darijan Matić (born 1983), Slovenian football manager and former footballer
- Darinka Matić Marović (1937–2020), Serbian conductor
- Darko Matić (born 1980), Bosnian-born Croatian footballer
- Darko Matić (born 1984), retired Serbian basketball player
- Davor Matić (born 1959), Croatian footballer and manager
- Dejan Matić (born 1978), Serbian folk singer
- Dimitrije Matić (1821–1884), Serbian philosopher and politician
- Dragutin Matić (1888–1970), Serbian military scout
- Dušan Matić (1898–1980), Serbian surrealist poet
- Gordana Matic, Croatian-American mathematician
- Gorana Matić (born 1973), Croatian tennis player
- Igor Matić (born 1981), Serbian footballer
- Ivan Matić (born 1971), Croatian football manager and former footballer
- Ivica Matić (1948–1976), Bosnian and Yugoslav filmmaker
- Ivona Matić (born 1986), Croatian basketball player
- Izidor Perera-Matić (1912–1944), Yugoslav Partisan and physician
- Kojo Matić (born 1995), footballer
- Marko Matić (born 1988), Croatian handball player
- Mateo Matic (born 1996), Swiss footballer
- Mert Matić (born 1995), Turkish volleyball player of Bosnian origin
- Mile Matić (1956–1994), Yugoslav prison guard and spree killer
- Milivoje Matić (born 1938), retired Serbian basketball player and sports physician
- Mislav Matić (born 2000), Croatian footballer
- Nemanja Matić (born 1988), Serbian footballer
- Petar Matić Dule (1920–2024), Yugoslav war veteran and general
- Peter Matić (1937–2019), Austrian stage, film, television and voice actor
- Petar Matić (businessman) (born 1966), Serbian businessman and amateur racing driver
- Petar Matić (Serbian actor) (1894–1966), from A Child of the Community, Atomic War Bride, Destination Death, Prvi građanin male varoši
- Predrag Matić (1962–2024), Croatian politician
- Saša Matić (born 1978), Bosnian Serb singer
- Saša Matić (born 1993), Swedish footballer
- Slavko Matić (born 1976), Serbian football manager and former footballer
- Stipe Matić (born 1979), former Croatian footballer
- Svetlana Matić (born 1966), Serbian writer
- Svetomir Matić (1870–1931), Serbian and Yugoslav army general
- Tatjana Matić (born 1972), Serbian politician
- Tijana Matić (born 1996), Serbian footballer
- Uroš Matić (born 1990), Serbian footballer
- Vasilije Matić (1906–1981), Yugoslav forestry expert
- Veran Matić (born 1962), Serbian media manager
- Veroljub Matić (born 1953), Serbian politician
- Veselin Matić (born 1960), Serbian basketball coach
- Vladan Matić (born 1970), Serbian handball player and coach
- Vladimir Matić (born 1983), Serbian footballer
- Vuk Matić (born 1978), Serbian musician
- Zoran Matić (born 1944), Serbian football coach

== See also ==
- Matići (disambiguation)
- Ivica Matić Award
