= Maciuś =

Maciuś is a Polish-language given name. It may be a diminutive form of the following given names, all of them being Polish-language variants of Matthias/Matthew:

- Maciej
- Mateusz
- Matiusz, in some adaptations of Król Maciuś Pierwszy (literally "King Maciuś the First")
