= Maćkowiak =

Maćkowiak (Polish pronunciation: [mat͡ɕˈkɔvjak]) is a Polish surname. It is derived from the given name Maciek, a diminutive of Maciej. The surname may refer to:

- Anton Mackowiak (1922–2013), German wrestler
- Jędrzej Maćkowiak (born 1992), Polish volleyball player
- Jules Mackowiak (1916-unknown), French canoeist
- Mateusz Maćkowiak, Polish footballer
- Rob Mackowiak (born 1976), American baseball player
- Robert Maćkowiak (born 1970), Polish athlete
