= Matev =

Matev (Bulgarian: Матев) is a Bulgarian masculine surname, its feminine counterpart is Mateva. Notable people with the surname include:

- Pavel Matev (1924–2006), Bulgarian poet
- Tsvetomir Matev (born 1986), Bulgarian football player

== See also ==
- Matevž (given name)
