= Matei =

- Pronunciation: Romanian: [maˈtej]
- Gender: male
- Language: Romanian

Origin
- Derivation: from the name Matthias

Other names
- Related names: Matej, Matěj, Maciej, Mateja, Matija, Matthias, Matthew

Matei (Romanian: [maˈtej]) is a Romanian masculine given name and surname.

It is derived from the given name Matthias and a is cognate to the English name Matthew.

== Notable people with the name ==
=== Given name ===
- Matei Balș (1905–1989), Romanian bacteriologist
- Matei Basarab (1588–1654), Wallachian Voivode between 1632 and 1654
- Matei Boilă (1926–2015), Romanian politician and priest
- Matei Călinescu (1934–2009), Romanian literary critic and university professor
- George Matei Cantacuzino (1899–1960), Romanian architect, painter and essayist
- Matei B. Cantacuzino (1855–1925), Romanian jurist and politician
- Matei Castriș (1863–1924), Romanian army general
- Matei Cazacu (born 1946), Romanian-French author and medieval historian
- Matei-Agathon Dan (1949–2023), Romanian economist and politician
- Matei Donici (1847–1921) Romanian poet, army general and politician
- Radu Matei Drăgușin (born 2002), Romanian footballer
- Matei Frunză (born 2006), Romanian footballer
- Matei Gantner (1934–2023), Romanian table tennis player
- Matei Ghica (c. 1720–1777), Prince of Wallachia between 1752 and 1753
- Matei Ilie (born 2002), Romanian footballer
- Matei Kalpakov, Bulgarian sprint canoer
- Matei Machedon (born 1960), Romanian–American mathematician
- Matei Millo (1813/14–1896), Moldavian and Romanian actor and playwright
- Matei Moraru (born 2005), Romanian footballer
- Matei Pampoulov (born 1949), Bulgarian tennis player
- Matei Pavel Haiducu (1948–1998), Romanian secret agent
- Matei Popa (born 2007), Romanian footballer
- Matei Socor (1908–1980), Romanian composer
- Matei Tănasă (born 2005), Romanian footballer
- Matei Vișniec (born 1956), Romanian-French playwright, poet and journalist
- Matei Vlădescu (1835–1901), Wallachian-born Romanian general
- Matei Zaharia (born 1984/85), Romanian-Canadian computer scientist

=== Surname ===
- Adrian Matei (born 1968), Romanian football player and manager
- Alexandru Matei (footballer) (born 2008), Romanian footballer
- Alexandru Matei (water polo) (born 1980), Romanian water polo player
- Aneta Matei (born 1948), Romanian rower
- Anișoara Matei (born 1951), Romanian sports shooter
- Călin Matei (born 1966), Romanian politician
- Constantin-Bogdan Matei (born 1980), Romanian politician
- Cosmin Matei (born 1991), Romanian footballer
- Cristian Matei (born 1977), Romanian composer
- Cristian Marius Matei (born 1987), Romanian futsal player
- Dan Matei (born 1981), Romanian footballer
- Dănuț Matei (born 1966), Romanian footballer
- David Matei (born 2006), Romanian footballer
- Draga Olteanu Matei (1933–2020), Romanian actress
- Edit Matei (born 1964), Romanian handballer
- Florentin Matei (born 1993), Romanian footballer
- Florin Matei (born 1983), Romanian futsal player
- Gabriel Matei (born 1990), Romanian footballer
- Iana Matei, Romanian activist
- Ilie Matei (born 1960), Romanian wrestler
- Ionuț Matei (born 1984), Romanian footballer
- Marius Matei (born 1984), Romanian footballer
- Mike Matei, American co-creator of The Angry Video Game Nerd
- Nicolae Matei (1863–1933), Romanian politician
- Sergiu Matei (born 1992), Moldovan footballer
- Simona Matei (born 1985), Romanian tennis player
- Sorin Matei (born 1963), Romanian high jumper
- Valeriu Matei (born 1959), Romanian writer and politician

== See also ==
- Matej
