= Mateo =

Mateo may refer to:

== People ==
Name

- Mateo (given name)
- Mateo (surname)

People named Mateo

- Mateo (singer) (born 1986), former stage name of American pop/R&B singer-songwriter
- Mateo Lisdero (Student) (Born 2014) Student of Dubai International Academy Emirates Hills

== Arts, entertainment, and media ==
- Mateo (1937 film), a 1937 Argentine film
- Mateo (2014 film), a 2014 Colombian film
- Mateo & Matos, team of deejays and house music producers
- Mateo Santos, a character on All My Children
- Mateo, minor character on children's educational series Danger Rangers.

== See also ==
- San Mateo (disambiguation)
- Matthew (disambiguation)
