= Dziewoński =

Dziewoński or Dziewonski is a surname. It may refer to:

- Adam Dziewonski (1936–2016), Polish-American geophysicist
- Edward Dziewoński (1916–2002), Polish stage and film actor, and theatre director
- Maciej Dziewoński (died 1794), Polish priest and spy
