= Matea =

- Gender: female
- Language: Croatian

Other names
- Related names: Mateja, Matija, Mateo

Matea is a feminine given name. It is the feminine form of the male name Mateo, Matej or Matija, which are Croatian forms of Matthew. It is derived from Matthaeus, which means "gift of God."

In Hebrew, the name Matea is a variant of Matityahu, meaning "gift of Yahweh." In Spanish, Matea is derived from Matilde, meaning "mighty in battle."

Notable people with the name include:

- Matea Bošnjak (born 1997), Croatian footballer
- Matea Churlinovska (born 2005), Macedonian handball player
- Matea Čiča (born 1985), Croatian badminton player
- Matea Ferk (born 1987), Croatian alpine skier
- Matea Gold, American journalist
- Matea Ikić (born 1989), Croatian volleyball player
- Matea Jelić (born 1997), Croatian taekwondo athlete
- Matea Matošević (born 1989), Croatian long-distance runner
- Matea Mezak (born 1985), Croatian tennis player
- Matea Parlov Koštro (born 1992), Croatian long-distance runner
- Matea Pletikosić (born 1998), Croatian-Montenegrin handball player
- Matea Samardžić (born 1995), Croatian swimmer
- Matea Sumajstorčić (born 1999), Croatian swimmer
- Matea Vrdoljak (born 1985), Croatian basketball player

== See also ==
- Mateja
- Mateo (given name)
