= Euroleague 2008–09 Rosters =

Euroleague 2008–09 team rosters:

- Air Avellino (Italian A Basketball League): Travis Best (USA), Drake Diener (USA), Chris Warren (USA), Peter Lisicky (USA), Tamar Slay (USA), Eric Williams (USA), Marcus Campbell (USA), Michael Nardi (USA), Marko Tušek (Slovenia), Nikola Radulović (Croatia), Antonio Porta (Argentina), Andrea Crosariol, Daniele Cinciarini, Pasquale Paolisso. Coach: Zare Markovski (Rep. Macedonia)
- AJ Olimpia Milano (Italian A Basketball League): David Hawkins (USA), Mike Hall (USA), Joey Beard (USA), Mason Rocca (USA/Italy), Jobey Thomas (USA), Pape Sow (Senegal), Ariel Filloy (Argentina), Yohann Sangare (France), Mindaugas Katelynas (Lithuania), Marko Micevic (Serbia), Massimo Bulleri, Marco Mordente, Luca Vitali. Coach: Piero Bucchi
- ALBA Berlin (German Basketball League): Casey Jacobsen (USA), Rashad Wright (USA), Julius Jenkins (USA), Ansu Sesay (USA), Adam Chubb (USA), Immanuel McElroy (USA), Aleksandar Nadjfeji (Serbia), Dragan Dojčin (Serbia), Patrick Femerling, Steffen Hamann, Johannes Herber, Oskar Fassler, Philip Zwiener, Andreas Seiferth, Oliver Clay, Dragiša Drobnjak (Slovenia). Coach: Luka Pavićević (Serbia)
- Asseco Prokom Sopot (Polish Basketball League): Daniel Ewing (USA), Ronnie Burrell (USA), David Logan (USA), Pat Burke (Ireland), Koko Archibong (Nigeria), Aleksej Nešović (Bosnia), Filip Dylewicz, Adam Łapeta, Piotr Szczotka, Adam Hrycaniuk, Tomasz Swietonski, Mateusz Kostrzewski, Aleksander Krauze, Slawomir Sikora. Coach: Tomas Pačėsas (Lithuania)
- Cibona VIP Zagreb (Croatian A1 League): Rawle Marshall (USA), Earl Calloway (USA), Jared Homan (USA), Vedran Vukušić (Bosnia), Damir Markota, Nikola Prkačin, Davor Kus, Marin Rozić, Branimir Longin, Lukša Andrić, Vedran Princ, Robert Troha, Franko Kaštropil, Goran Vrbanc, Filip Kruslin, Leon Radosevic, Tomislav Zubčić. Coach: Velimir Perasović
- CSKA Moscow (Russian Basketball Super League): Ramūnas Šiškauskas (Lithuania), Trajan Langdon (USA), J.R. Holden (USA/Russia), Terence Morris (USA), Matjaž Smodiš (Slovenia), Zoran Planinić (Croatia), Nikos Zisis (Greece), Erazem Lorbek (Slovenia), Viktor Khryapa, Alexander "Sasha" Kaun, Alexey Shved, Viktor Keyru, Andrey Vorontsevich. Coach: Ettore Messina (Italy)
- DKV Joventut Badalona (Spanish ACB League): Bracey Wright (USA), Demond Mallet (USA), Jérôme Moïso (France), Simas Jasaitis (Lithuania), Luka Bogdanović (Serbia), Jan-Hendrik Jagla (Germany), Henk Norel (Netherlands), Dmitry Flis (Russia), Ricky Rubio, Eduardo Hernández-Sonseca, Pau Ribas, Ferran Laviña. Coach: Sito Alonso
- Efes Pilsen İstanbul (Turkish Basketball League): Mario Kasun (Croatia), Bootsy Thornton (USA), Charles Smith (USA), Preston Shumpert (USA), Cliff Hammonds (USA), Miloš Vujanić (Serbia), Michalis Kakiouzis (Greece), Predrag Drobnjak, (Montenegro) Kaya Peker, Kerem Gönlüm, Sinan Güler, Ender Arslan, Mustafa Abi, Engin Atsür, Cenk Akyol, Barış Hersek. Coach: Ergin Ataman
- Fenerbahçe Ülker İstanbul (Turkish Basketball League): Gordan Giriček (Croatia), Marques Green (USA), Devin Smith (USA), Damir Mršić (Bosnia), Gašper Vidmar (Slovenia), Emir Preldžič (Slovenia), Mirsad Türkcan, Ömer Onan, Oğuz Savaş, Semih Erden, Ömer Aşık, Rasim Başak, Hakan Demirel, Serhat Çetin, Enes Kanter. Coach: Bogdan Tanjević (Montenegro)
- Le Mans Sarthe Basket (French Pro A League): Dewarick Spencer (USA), Brian Chase (USA), David Bluthenthal (USA/Israel), João Paulo Batista (Brazil), Maleye N'Doye (Senegal), Nequeba Samake (Mali), Pape Badiane, Alain Koffi, Jeremy Leloup, Antoine Diot, John Walter Wilkins, Antoine Gomis, Enzo Tsonga, Pierre-Etienne Drouault. Coach: J.D. Jackson (Canada)
- Lottomatica Virtus Roma (Italian A Basketball League): Sani Bečirovič (Slovenia), Primož Brezec (Slovenia), Andre Hutson (USA), Ibrahim Jaaber (USA), Brandon Jennings (USA), Rodrigo De la Fuente (Spain), Roberto Gabini (Argentina), Luigi Datome, Alessandro Tonolli, Jacopo Giachetti, Angelo Gigli. Coach: Ferdinando Gentile (Italy)
- Maccabi Tel Aviv (Israeli Basketball Super League): Carlos Arroyo (Puerto Rico), Marcus Brown (USA), Chester "Tre" Simmons (USA), D'or Fischer (USA), Jason Williams (USA), Derrick Sharp (USA/Israel), Tal Burstein, Yaniv Green, Lior Eliyahu, Dror Hajaj, Omri Casspi, Marcus Fizer (USA). Coach: Pini Gershon
- Montepaschi Siena (Italian A Basketball League): Terrell McIntyre (USA), Henry Domercant (USA/Bosnia), Morris Finley (USA), Shaun Stonerook (USA/Italy), Kšyštof Lavrinovič (Lithuania), Rimantas Kaukėnas (Lithuania), Romain Sato (Central African Rep.), Benjamin Eze (Nigeria), Tomas Ress, Marco Carraretto, Luca Lechthaler, David Cournooh (Ghana). Coach: Simone Pianigiani
- Olympiacos Piraeus (Greek A1 League): Josh Childress (USA), Nikola Vujčić (Croatia), Lynn Greer (USA), Zoran Erceg (Serbia), Yotam Halperin (Israel), Miloš Teodosić (Serbia), Igor Milošević (Serbia), Arvydas Macijauskas (Lithuania), Theodoros Papaloukas, Sofoklis Schortsanitis, Michalis Pelekanos, Ioannis Bouroussis, Panagiotis Vasilopoulos, Giorgos Printezis, Ian Vougioukas, Haris Yiannopoulos, Kostas Sloukas, Ioannis Karathanasis. Coach: Panagiotis Giannakis
- Panathinaikos Athens (Greek A1 League): Šarūnas Jasikevičius (Lithuania), Mike Batiste (USA), Drew Nicholas (USA), Nikola Peković (Montenegro), Dušan Kecman (Serbia), Dimitris Diamantidis, Vassilis Spanoulis, Antonis Fotsis, Kostas Tsartsaris, Nikos Hatzivrettas, Stratos Perperoglou, Dušan Šakota, Fragiskos Alvertis, Dimitris Verginis, Aris Tatarounis. Coach: Željko Obradović (Serbia)
- Panionios On Telecoms Athens (Greek A1 League): Aaron Miles (USA), Lonny Baxter (USA), Goran Nikolić (Montenegro), Levon Kendall (Canada), Ivan Zoroski (Serbia), Branko Cvetković (Serbia), Miroslav Raičević (Serbia), Dimos Dikoudis, Ioannis Giannoulis, Vasilis Xanthopoulos, Giannis Kalambokis, Ioannis Georgallis, Prodromos Dreliozis, Andreas Kanonidis, Michael Paragyios. Coach: Aleksandar Trifunović (Serbia)
- Partizan Igokea Belgrade (Serbian Sinalco League): Stéphane Lasme (Gabon), Jan Veselý (Czech Rep.), Slavko Vraneš (Montenegro), Žarko Rakočević (Montenegro), João Soares (Portugal), Novica Veličković, Aleksandar Rašić, Milenko Tepić, Uroš Tripković, Petar Božić, Vukašin Aleksić, Marko Đurković, Čedomir Vitkovac, Strahinja Milošević. Coach: Duško Vujošević (Montenegro)
- Real Madrid (Spanish ACB League): Louis Bullock (USA), Jeremiah Massey (USA), Quinton Hosley (USA), Venson Hamilton (USA), Pepe Sánchez (Argentina), Marko Tomas (Croatia), Axel Hervelle (Belgium), Thomas Van Den Spiegel (Belgium), Raúl López, Felipe Reyes, Álex Mumbrú, Sergio Llull. Coach: Joan Plaza
- Regal FC Barcelona (Spanish ACB League): David Andersen (Australia), Jaka Lakovič (Slovenia), Andre Barrett (USA), Daniel Santiago (Puerto Rico), Luboš Bartoň (Czech Rep.), Ersan İlyasova (Turkey), Gianluca Basile (Italy), Juan Carlos Navarro, Fran Vázquez, Jordi Trias, Roger Grimau, Víctor Sada, Xavi Rey. Coach: Xavi Pascual
- SLUC Nancy (French Pro A League): Rod Benson (USA), Lamayn Wilson (USA), Ricardo Greer (Dominican Rep.), Jeff Greer (Dominican Rep.), John Cox (Venezuela), Amadou Aboubacar Zaki (Niger), Saidou Njoya (Cameroon), Yohann Jacques, Cyril Julian, Michel Morandais, Steed Tchicamboud, T.J. Parker, Victor Samnick. Coach: Jean-Luc Monschau
- TAU Ceramica Vitoria (Spanish ACB League): Pablo Prigioni (Argentina), Tiago Splitter (Brazil), Igor Rakočević (Serbia), Pete Mickeal (USA), Will McDonald (USA), Mustafa Shakur (USA), Mirza Teletović (Bosnia), Stanko Barać (Croatia), Ariel Eslava (Argentina), Matías Nocedal (Argentina), Fernando San Emeterio, Sergi Vidal. Coach: Duško Ivanović (Montenegro)
- Unicaja Málaga (Spanish ACB League): Marcus Haislip (USA), Omar Cook (USA), Thomas Kelati (USA), Jiří Welsch (Czech Rep.), Boniface N'Dong (Senegal), Robert Archibald (Scotland), Joseph Gomis (France), Michal Chylinski (Poland), Germán Gabriel, Carlos Jiménez, Carlos Cabezas, Berni Rodríguez, Alfonso Sanchez, Vítor Faverani (Brazil). Coach: Aíto García Reneses
- Union Olimpija Ljubljana (Premier A Slovenian Basketball League): Frank Robinson (USA) Jasmin Hukić (Bosnia), Vlado Ilievski (Rep. Macedonia), Dejan Radojević (Serbia), Vladimir Golubović (Montenegro), Damjan Rudež (Croatia), Marko Milič, Sašo Ožbolt, Jaka Klobučar, Mirza Begić, Miha Zupan, Mirza Sarajlija, Matic Sirnik. Coach: Gasper Potocnik (Slovenia)
- Žalgiris Kaunas (Lithuanian Basketball League): Loren Woods (USA), Ratko Varda (Serbia), Tomas Masiulis, Rolandas Alijevas, Povilas Butkevicius, Eurelijus Žukauskas, Dainius Šalenga, Paulius Jankūnas, Jonas Mačiulis, Tadas Klimavičius, Mantas Kalnietis, Žygimantas Janavičius, Donatas Motiejūnas. Coach: Rimantas Grigas
