= Marianna Brunianová =

Austrian stage actress (1740-1799)

Marianna Brunianová (1740 in Vienna – 11 April 1799 in Prague) was an Austrian stage actress. From 1768, she lived and worked mostly in Prague in Bohemia.

She was the daughter of the actor Ch. Schulze and married the ballet dancer Mion. From at least 1765 onward, she was engaged at the theatre company of JJ Bruniana (whom she married in 1773), where she belonged to the leading members. Prior to the 1780s there was no permanent Czech language theatre, but the travelling theatre company of JJ Bruniana was based in Prague in 1768–1778 and very successful. In 1796–1799, she was engaged at the Vlastenské Theatre. She performed in both theatre plays and operas and was particularly noted as a soubrette.
