= Mašiotas =

- Lithuanian surname
- m.: Mašiotas
- f.: (unmarried): Mašiotytė
- f.: (married): Mašiotienė

Mašiotas is a Lithuanian surname. It is a Lithuanization of the Polish surname Maszota, derived from the diminutive Masz for Mateusz. The surnames Mašionis, Mašaitis, and Mašiokas are of the same provenance. Notable people with the surname include:

- Jonas Mašiotas (comptroller) (1874–1947), Lithuanian mathematician, engineer, state comptroller
- Jonas Mašiotas (educator) (1897–1953), Lithuanian pedagogue, mathematician, politician and public figure
- Ona Mašiotienė née Brazauskaitė (Polish: Anna Brzozowska; 1883–1949), Lithuanian teacher and principal, women's rights activist and writer
- Pranas Mašiotas (1863–1940), Lithuanian activist, educator, children's writer and translator
