= Pilarczyk =

Pilarczyk is a surname. Notable people with the surname include:

- Daniel Edward Pilarczyk (1934–2020), American Roman Catholic archbishop
- Helga Pilarczyk (1926–2011), German operatic soprano
- Krystian Pilarczyk (born 1941), Polish-Dutch hydraulic engineer
- Ryszard Pilarczyk (born 1975), Polish sprinter
- Zbigniew Pilarczyk (1950–2025), Polish historian
