= Matejić (surname) =

Matejić (Serbian Cyrillic: Матејић) is a Serbian surname, a patronymic derived from Mateja (English: Matthew). It may refer to:

- Božur Matejić (born 1963), former Serbian footballer
- Mateja Matejić (born 1924), Serbian Orthodox priest
- Paulj Matejić (c. 1770–1816), Serbian Revolutionary

== See also ==
- Matejević
- Matijić
- Matijević
