= Péter Máté (disambiguation) =

Péter Máté (1947–1984) was a Hungarian singer, composer, and pianist.

Péter Máté may also refer to:

- Péter Máté (footballer, born 1979), Hungarian footballer
- Péter Máté (footballer, born 1984), Hungarian footballer

== See also ==
- Máté (surname)
