= Matich (surname) =

Matich is a surname. Notable people with the surname include:

- Brent Matich (born December 5, 1966), former Canadian football punter
- Frank Matich (1935–2015), Australian racing car driver
- Matt Matich (born 1991), New Zealand rugby union player
- Trevor Matich (born 1961), American football analyst and former player

== See also ==
- Matić
