= Josefa Butteau =

Josefa Butteau (1753–1815) was a stage actress and ballerina.

She was from 1771 married to the actor and dancer Jean Butteau, and the mother of Katharina Butteau. She was engaged as a ballet- and pantomime dancer in the Vienna Ballet, in the Kotcích Theater in Prague in 1778, and at the Estates Theatre in 1783, and as an actor at the Czech language Vlastenské Theatre in 1790-92 and at the Estates Theatre from 1798 onward. As an actress she was mostly known for her roles as confidantes.
