= Zuzana Seve =

Zuzana Seve née Franck (died after 1797) was an actress . She is known as a member of the founding pioneer generation of the first Czech language theater in Prague, the Vlastenské Theatre.

Her background is not known. She was first married to the actor, dramatist and ballet master František Xaver Seve (1754-1791) and secondly in 1792 to the actor Matěj Majober, and became the mother of Karl, Maria Anna, Antonia and Ferdinand, who all became actors.

She made her debut at the Estates Theatre in 1785, and was engaged as one of the first actresses at the foundation of the Vlastenské Theatre the following year. She was often given heroine roles and later mother parts, and was also known to perform singing parts. She was praised by critics for her good costume and her Czech songs. She and her spouse retired from the stage in 1797, but she stayed in the theatre as instructor.
