= Matejić =

Matejić may refer to:

- Matejić Monastery
- Matejić (surname)
