= Zbigniew Pilarczyk =

Polish historian and academic (1950–2025)

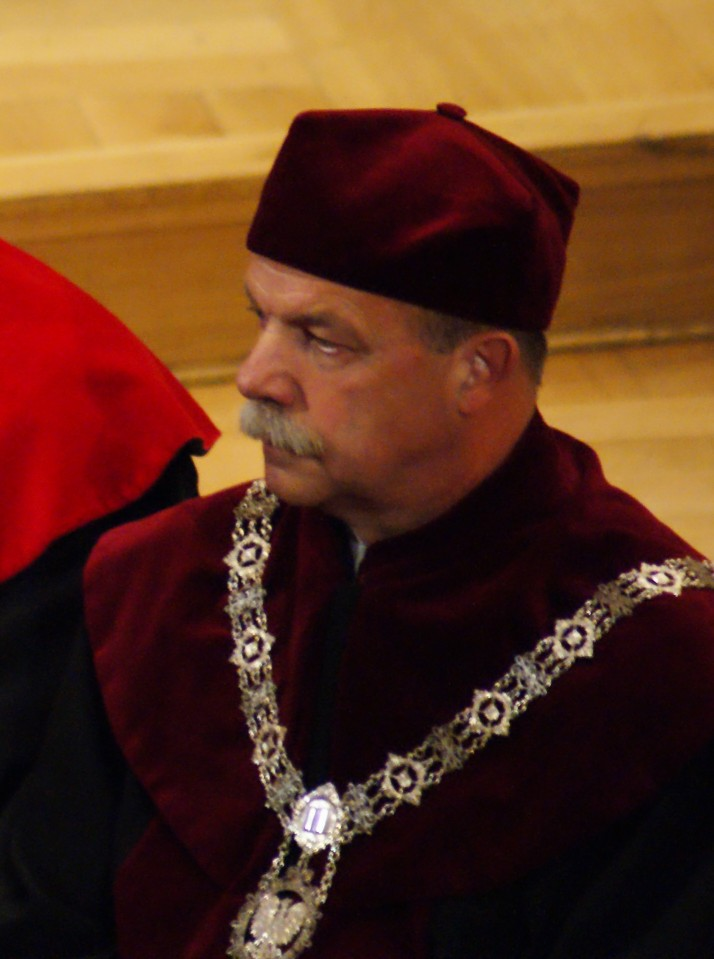
- Born: 10 July 1950; Wronki, Poland
- Died: 21 October 2025 (aged 75); Poznań, Poland
- Occupations: Doctor of Historical Sciences, university professor and Vice-Rector
- Spouse: Bogna Pilarczyk

Academic background
- Education: Adam Mickiewicz University in Poznań
- Doctoral advisors: Karol Olejnik
- Website: Pilarczyk profile

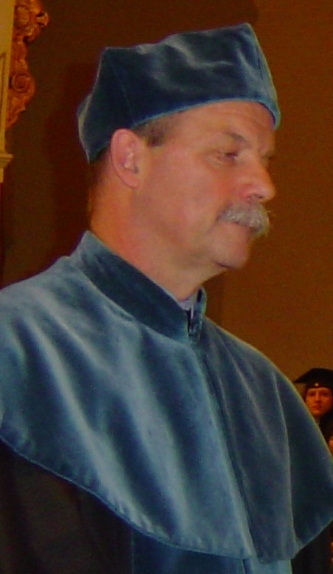
Pilarczyk as vice-dean of the Faculty of History at UAM (2006)

Zbigniew Pilarczyk (10 July 1950 – 21 October 2025) was a Polish historian specialising in military history and academic who was a professor at the Adam Mickiewicz University in Poznań. He was the Head of the Military History Department at UAM as well as Vice–Rector of Student Affairs for the terms 2008–2012 and 2012–2016.

== Life and career ==
Between 1964 and 1969, Pilarczyk studied at the Pedagogical Secondary School in Trzcianka. Between the years 1970–1975, Pilarczyk studied history at the Faculty of Philosophy and History at UAM. After graduating, he started research work at the same Faculty which was renamed to the Faculty of History after reorganizations in 1976.

In 1985 he obtained his doctoral degree based on the dissertation entitled The Defense of the City of Poznań in the Years 1253–1783 and in 1998, a postdoctoral degree (habilitation thesis: Fortifications in the Crown Lands of the Polish-Lithuanian Commonwealth in the 17th Century). In 2000, Pilarczyk was given the position of professor at UAM.

From 2002 to 2008, Pilarczyk was the Vice-Dean for Teaching at the Faculty of History and, at the same time, member of the Rector's Commission for Teaching. He would then have the role of Vice–Rector of Student Affairs for the terms 2008–2012 and 2012–2016.

He specialised in medieval history, military history, fortifications, and scouting. He was a lecturer at the Faculty of History of UAM, the Faculty of Pedagogy and Fine Arts of UAM in Kalisz, and the Doctoral Program at the Faculty of Civil Engineering of the Poznań University of Technology. He supervised 12 doctoral and 250 master's degree students in his career.

From 1967, Pilarczyk was an instructor for the Polish Scouting and Guiding Association. He also served as chairman of the Council of the Wielkopolska Banner of the Polish Scouting and Guiding Association in Poznań and a member of the Program Council of the Museum of Scouting in Warsaw and the Council of the Wielkopolska Museum of Independence in Poznań.

For his activities he was awarded the Medal of the Commission of National Education and the Badge of Honor "For Merit to Education". In 2008, he was awarded the "Drummer of the Greater Poland Uprising" statuette by the Main Board of the Society for the Remembrance of the Greater Poland Uprising 1918–19. In 2005 he was awarded the Knight's Cross of the Order of Polonia Restituta and in 2025 the Officer's Cross

Pilarczyk died on 21 October 2025, at the age of 75. On 28 October, after a mass at the Church of the Epiphany in Poznań, Pilarczyk was buried at the Junikowo Cemetery in Poznań.

== Publications ==
- Poznań's defenses in the years 1253–1793, Warsaw–Poznań 1988
- Fortifications in the Crown Lands of the Polish-Lithuanian Commonwealth in the 17th Century, Poznań 1997
- Rawicz as an example of a new town location in the Polish-Lithuanian Commonwealth in the 17th century, Rawicz 1998
- Poznań: city fortifications: guide, Poznań 2004 (with Witold Gostyński)
- 50 years of activity of the Historical Commission of the Greater Poland Banner of the Polish Scouting and Guiding Association 1957–2007, Poznań 2007 (with Marian Pietrzykowski)
- Since the pagan invasions, Your Majesty's countries have been peaceful so far...: studies offered on the seventieth anniversary of the birth of Professor Karol Olejnik, Toruń 2008 (with Maciej Franz)
