= Matěj =

Matěj (Czech: [ˈmacɛj]) is a Czech masculine given name, a Czech variant of the name Matthias. Similar Slavic given names include Matej and Maciej, the English counterpart is Matthew.

Notable people with the name include:

== Sports ==
- Matěj Beran (born 1993), Czech ice hockey player
- Matěj Blümel (born 2000), Czech ice hockey player
- Matěj Chaluš (born 1998), Czech footballer
- Matěj Hadaš (born 2003), Czech footballer
- Matěj Hanousek (born 1993), Czech footballer
- Matěj Havran (born 2002), Czech handball player
- Matěj Helebrand (born 1997), Czech footballer
- Matěj Helešic (born 1996), Czech footballer
- Matěj Hrabina (born 1993), Czech footballer
- Matěj Hybš (born 1993), Czech footballer
- Matěj Jurásek (born 2003), Czech footballer
- Matěj Klíma (born 1999), Czech handball player
- Matěj Končal (born 1993), Czech footballer
- Matěj Kovář (born 2000), Czech footballer
- Matěj Kozubek (born 1996), Czech marathon swimmer
- Matěj Krsek (born 2000), Czech sprinter
- Matěj Kůs (born 1989), Czech motorcycle speedway rider
- Matěj Kvíčala (born 1989), Czech luger
- Matěj Lasák (born 1992), Czech cyclo-cross cyclist
- Matěj Luksch (born 1998), Czech footballer
- Matěj Machovský (born 1993), Czech ice hockey player
- Matěj Majka (born 2000), Czech footballer
- Matěj Marič (born 1991), Czech footballer
- Matěj Novák (born 1989), Czech ice dancer
- Matěj Paprčiak (born 1991), Czech footballer
- Matěj Pechman (1893–1973), Czech equestrian
- Matěj Polidar (born 1999), Czech footballer
- Matěj Psota (born 1994), Czech ice hockey player
- Matěj Pulkrab (born 1997), Czech footballer
- Matěj Ryneš (born 2001), Czech footballer
- Matěj Ščerba (born 1998), Czech pole vaulter
- Matěj Šín (born 2004), Czech footballer
- Matěj Štochl (born 1989), Czech footballer
- Matěj Sebera (born 2001), Czech ice hockey player
- Matěj Stránský (born 1993), Czech ice hockey player
- Matěj Stříteský (born 1990), Czech ice hockey player
- Matěj Švancer (born 2004), Czech-Austrian freestyle skier
- Matěj Trojovský (born 1984), Czech ice hockey player
- Matěj Valenta (born 2000), Czech footballer
- Matěj Vocel (born 1997), Czech tennis player
- Matěj Vydra (born 1992), Czech footballer
- Matěj Zadražil (born 1994), Czech ice hockey player
- Matěj Zahálka (born 1993), Czech cyclist

== Other ==
- Bohuslav Matěj Černohorský (1684–1742), Czech composer and organist
- Karel Matěj Čapek-Chod (1860–1927), Czech writer and journalist
- Matěj Gregor (born 2002), Czech politician
- Matěj Hádek (born 1975), Czech actor
- Matěj Ondřej Havel (born 1987), Czech politician
- Matěj Homola (born 1973), Czech musician
- Matěj Kopecký (1775–1847), Czech puppeteer
- Václav Matěj Kramerius (1753–1808), Czech publisher, journalist and writer
- Matěj Majober (1763-1812), Czech stage actor and playwright
- Josef Matěj Navrátil (1798–1865), Czech painter
- Matěj Pavlík (1879–1942), known as Gorazd of Prague, Czech Orthodox Prelate
- Matěj Poustevník (fl. 1520s), Czech preacher
- Matěj Rejsek (c. 1445–1506), Czech stonemason, sculptor, builder and architect
- Matěj Ruppert (born 1978), Czech singer
- Matěj Stropnický (born 1983), Czech politician and actor
- Matěj Vůdce (died 1409), Czech medieval bandit
