= Mates =

Mates is an English surname, and may refer to:

- James Mates (born 1964), British newsreader and journalist
- Michael Mates (born 1934), British politician
- Frederick S. Mates, founded the Mates Investment Fund in 1967 that crashed in the bear market of 1970
- Benson Mates, American philosopher

== See also ==
- Mate (disambiguation)
- Mates condoms
- Mates (film)
- Friendship
- Mates by Irvine Sellars, British clothing retail chain
