= Matěj Majober =

Czech stage actor and playwright

Matěj Majober (1763-1812) was a stage actor and playwright from the Austrian Empire.

He is known to have been a member of the theater company of G. Jung in 1783–86. He was a leading member and part manager of the pioneer Czech language Vlastenské Theatre in Prague. He also produced several Czech language plays which were staged during his lifetime.

He was married to Zuzana Seve.
