= Macur =

Macur is a Polish surname. Notable people with the surname include:

- Andrzej Macur (born 1959), Polish sport shooter
- Julia Macur (born 1957), British judge
- Juliet Macur, American journalist
- Julita Macur (born 1959), Polish sport shooter

== See also ==
- Macura
