= Máté (given name) =

Máté is a masculine Hungarian given name. Notable people with the name include:

- Máté Balogh (born 1990), Hungarian composer and university lecturer
- Máté Bella (born 1985), Hungarian composer and university lecturer
- Máté Csák, multiple people
- Máté Czingráber (born 1997), Hungarian footballer
- Máté Fazekas (born 2006), Hungarian handball player
- Máté Fejes (born 1988), Hungarian ice dancer
- Máté Fenyvesi (1933–2022), Hungarian footballer
- Máté Gulyás (born 1988), Hungarian footballer
- Máté Halász (born 1984), Hungarian handballer
- Máté Helebrandt (born 1989), Hungarian racewalker
- Máté Hidvégi (born 1955), Hungarian biochemist
- Máté Katona (born 1990), Hungarian footballer
- Máté Kiss (born 1991), Hungarian footballer
- Máté Tamás Koch (born 1999), Hungarian épée fencer
- Máté Kocsis (born 1981), Hungarian jurist and politician
- Máté Lékai (born 1988), Hungarian handballer
- Máté Molnár (born 1979), Hungarian bassist
- Máté Pátkai (born 1988), Hungarian footballer
- Máté Simon (born 2006), Hungarian footballer
- Máté Skriba (born 1992), Hungarian footballer
- Máté Toroczkai (1553–1616), fifth bishop of the Unitarian Church in Cluj
- Máté Tóth (footballer, born 1991), Hungarian footballer for Vasas SC
- Máté Tóth (footballer, born 1998), Hungarian footballer for Szombathelyi Haladás
- Máté Tuboly (born 2004), Hungarian footballer
- Máté Vass (born 1990), Hungarian footballer
- Máté Zalka (1896–1937), Hungarian writer and revolutionary

== See also ==
- Mate (given name)
- Máté (surname)
- Matthew (given name)
