= Katharina Butteau =

Katharina Butteau (1776- after 1815) was a stage actress and ballet dancer.

She was the daughter of the actor and dancer Jean Butteau and Josefa Butteau. She made her debut at the Estates Theatre in Prague in 1784. She acted in several of the pioneer Czech language performances given at the theatre. In 1784-87, she acted in children's roles at the pioneer Czech language Vlastenské Theatre, where she was among the first actresses employed. In 1789, she was contracted at the Estates Theatre. She mainly played soubrette and heroine roles. As her father, she also performed as a ballet dancer when the theater offered such performances. She was given good critique both as an actor and as a ballet dancer in contemporary press.
