= Maciek =

Maciek is a Polish masculine diminutive of Maciej. Notable people with the name include:

- Maciek Malish (1962–2015), Polish-American sound editor
- Maciek Miernik, Polish musician
- Maciek Pysz (born 1982), Polish jazz musician and guitarist
- Maciek Sykut (born 1986), American tennis player

== Fictional characters ==
- Maciek Chełmicki, a character from the Polish film Ashes and Diamonds played by Zbigniew Cybulski
