= Peter Lisicky =

American basketball player

Peter Lisicky (born March 3, 1976) is a retired American basketball player. He played professionally in several countries, including a stint in Italy's Lega Basket Serie A and EuroLeague.

== Early life ==
Lisicky grew up in Whitehall Township, Pennsylvania, a suburb of Allentown, in a family of eight children. His father Jack played a season of basketball at LaSalle University with television color commentator Bill Raftery. Five of his siblings played collegiate sports. Three played basketball: Gabe at East Tennessee State, Mary at Georgetown, and Jack at the University of Scranton; Andy played football at the Penn; Alex was a collegiate coed cheerleader at both Penn State and the North Carolina.

== Basketball career ==
=== High school ===
Lisicky was a four-year starter at Whitehall High School and he is the school's all-time leading scorer with 1,974 points. He was rated as a top 50 recruit in the nation and attended the invitation-only Nike Camp in 1992 and 1993. He was featured on ESPN for winning the three-point contest in 1993, defeating Trajan Langdon. Pete was invited to and participated in the Nike Fab 40 weekend, where other attendees included Kevin Garnett, Allen Iverson, and Stephon Marbury. He was twice named Pennsylvania AP All-State and has been voted one of the top 150 Pennsylvania scholastic players of all time.

=== College ===
Lisicky finished as the second all-time leading scorer in Penn State history (now stands at fifth all-time). He led the Nittany Lions to one NCAA tournament appearance as a 5-seed in 1996, as well as two NIT Final Fours at Madison Square Garden (Penn State finished in third in 1995 and as runners-up in 1998). In 1996, PSU reached as high as #8 in the AP Top 25 poll. He was All Big Ten 1996, 1997, and 1998; earned Honorable Mention for AP All-American in 1996, and holds numerous Penn State records. He was a member of the USA under-22 National Team, which played an exhibition game against the United States men's national basketball team in 1996. Pete held the Big Ten record for career three-point field goals made from 1998–2010 (332), was voted Penn State's Male Athlete of the Year in 1998, was a three-time GTE Academic All-American, and was a finalist for the Anson Mount National Scholar Athlete of the Year in 1998.

=== Professional ===
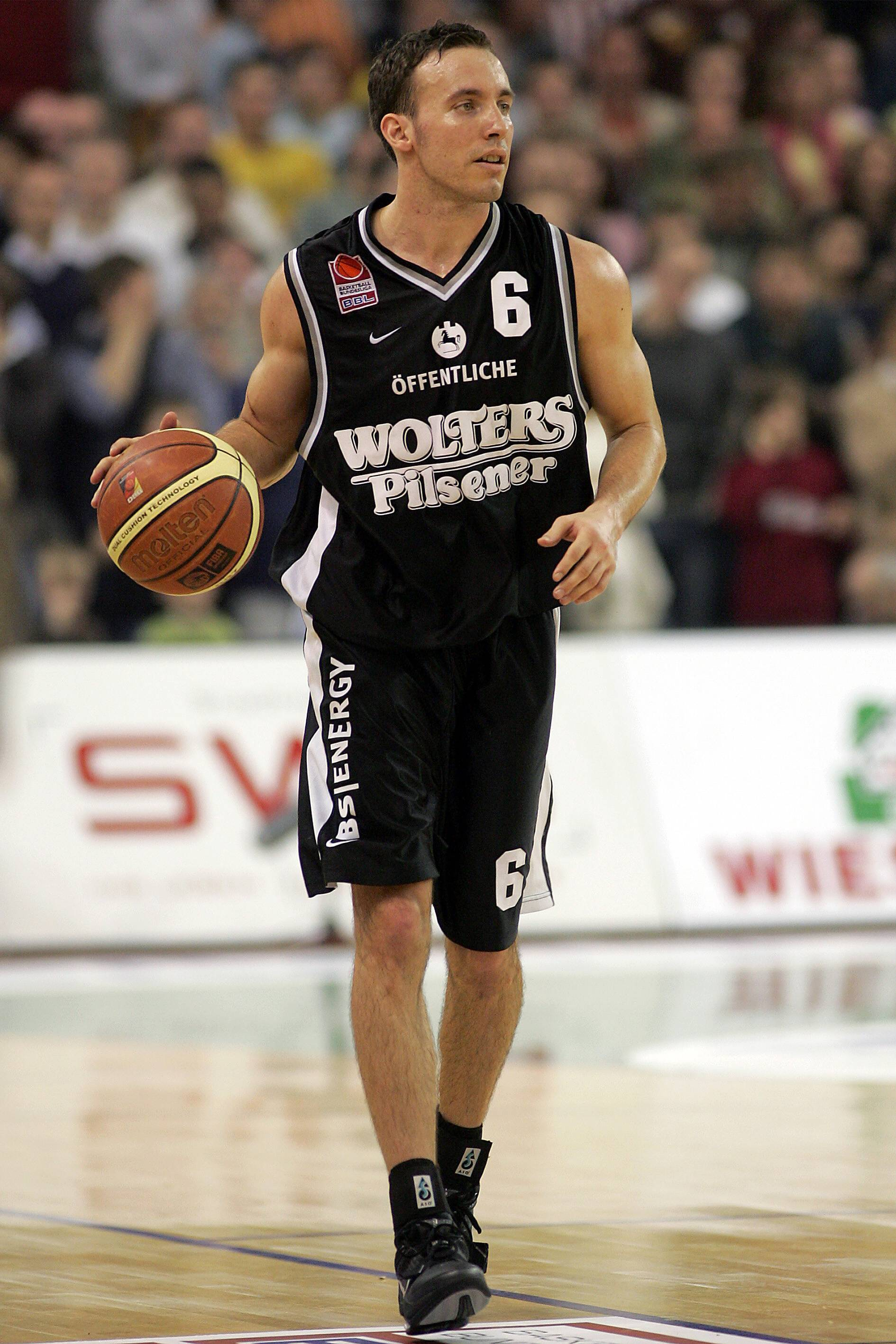
Lisicky playing with Braunschweig, 2003

Lisicky played eleven uninterrupted seasons of professional basketball in Europe:

- 1998 Benetton Treviso (Italy), Saporta Cup Champions
- 1999 Vacallo Win (Switzerland), Swiss Cup Champions
- 2000 Vacallo Win (Switzerland), Swiss Cup Champions
- 2001 Benetton Fribourg (Switzerland)
- 2002 Lugano Snakes (Switzerland), Swiss Cup Champions (MVP), Swiss League Champions
- 2003–2005 Braunschweig (Germany)
- 2005 Paris Basket Racing (France)
- 2006 Anwil Włocławek (Poland), Polish League Runner-up
- 2007–2009 Air Avellino (Italy), Italian Cup Champions, Euroleague participant

A third generation Slovak-American, Lisicky also played on the Slovak national team, representing the country at the 2005 European Championship (Division B), averaging 10.2 points per contest.

== Post-basketball career ==
Since retiring from the European professional ranks, Lisicky works in wealth management as a Certified Financial Planner in Scottsdale, Arizona. He is active in community and philanthropic activities, including coaching in a recreational league and organizing/participating in events supporting the American Cancer Society's Coaches vs. Cancer campaign. He organized "Pete Lisicky's Scorer's Clinic," a three-night event in Allentown benefiting Coaches vs. Cancer. For a contribution to the organization, kids learned about basketball fundamentals and shooting tips from Whitehall High's all-time leading scorer. He is still active in basketball, coaching AAU teams and at the Boys and Girls Club.

He currently resides in Scottsdale with his wife Kristin and son Charles.
