= Matej =

- Pronunciation: Croatian pronunciation: [mǎtej] Slovene pronunciation: [matɛ́ːj] Slovak pronunciation: [macɛj]
- Gender: male
- Language: Slovak, Slovenian, Croatian

Origin
- Derivation: from the Greek name Matthias

Other names
- Related names: Matěj, Matija, Mateja, Matic, Matei, Maciej, Mateusz, Matthew

Matej is a Slavic masculine given name. It is a common male name in Slovakia and Slovenia, and is also used in Croatia. The name is originally derived from the Greek name Matthias, borne by Matthias the Apostle. The name Matej has its root in the Hebrew word Mattityahu and means 'God's gift'.

The Czech counterpart is Matěj, the Polish counterpart is Maciej, and the English counterpart is Matthew. Notable people with the name include:

== Sports ==
=== Football ===
- Matej Bagarić (born 1989), Croatian footballer
- Matej Centrih (born 1988), Slovenian footballer
- Matej Čurma (born 1996), Slovak footballer
- Matej Cvetanoski (born 1997), Macedonian footballer
- Matej Deket (born 2009), Bosnian footballer
- Matej Deković (born 1993), Croatian footballer
- Matej Delač (born 1992), Croatian footballer
- Matej Dybala (born 1999), Slovak footballer
- Matej Franko (born 2001), Slovak footballer
- Matej Fras (born 1976), Slovenian footballer
- Matej Gorelka (born 1989), Slovak footballer
- Matej Grešák (born 1999), Slovak footballer
- Matej Hradecky (born 1995), Finnish footballer
- Matej Ižvolt (born 1986), Slovak footballer
- Matej Jakúbek (born 1995), Slovak footballer
- Matej Jelić (born 1990), Croatian footballer
- Matej Jonjić (born 1991), Croatian footballer
- Matej Jug (born 1980), Slovenian football referee
- Matej Kochan (born 1992), Slovak footballer
- Matej Krajčík (born 1978), Slovak footballer
- Matej Král (born 1990), Slovak footballer
- Matej Loduha (born 1993), Slovak footballer
- Matej Madleňák (born 1999), Slovak footballer
- Matej Maglica (born 1998), Croatian footballer
- Matej Marković (born 1996), Croatian footballer
- Matej Mavrič (born 1979), Slovenian footballer
- Matej Mitrović (born 1993), Croatian footballer
- Matej Moško (born 1999), Slovak footballer
- Matej Náther (born 1985), Slovak footballer
- Matej Oravec (born 1998), Slovak footballer
- Matej Palčič (born 1993), Slovenian footballer
- Matej Peternel (born 1992), Slovenian footballer
- Matej Podlogar (born 1991), Slovenian footballer
- Matej Podstavek (born 1991), Slovak footballer
- Matej Poplatnik (born 1992), Slovenian footballer
- Matej Pučko (born 1993), Slovenian footballer
- Matej Radan (born 1990), Slovenian footballer
- Matej Rakovan (born 1990), Slovak footballer
- Matej Rapnik (born 1990), Slovenian footballer
- Matej Riznič (born 2004), Slovak footballer
- Matej Rodin (born 1996), Croatian footballer
- Matej Šakota (born 2004), Bosnian footballer
- Matej Šavol (born 1984), Slovak footballer
- Matej Šimić (born 1995), Croatian footballer
- Matej Siva (born 1984), Slovak footballer
- Matej Sivrić (born 1989), Croatian footballer
- Matej Slávik (born 1994), Slovak footballer
- Matej Šnofl (born 1977), Slovenian footballer
- Matej Székely (born 1991), Slovak footballer
- Matej Trusa (born 2000), Slovak footballer
- Matej Vuk (born 2000), Croatian footballer

=== Other sports ===
- Matej Ašanin (born 1993), Croatian handball player
- Matej Baloga (born 1997), Slovak biathlete
- Matej Bene (born 1992), Slovak ice hockey player
- Matej Beňuš (born 1987), Slovak slalom canoeist
- Matej Černič (born 1978), Italian volleyball player
- Matej Češík (born 1988), Slovak ice hockey player
- Matej Dodig (born 2005), Croatian tennis player
- Matej Duša (born 2000), Slovak swimmer
- Matej Falat (born 1993), Slovak alpine skier
- Matej Ferjan (1977–2011), Slovenian motorcycle speedway rider
- Matej Gaber (born 1991), Slovenian handball player
- Matej Gnezda (born 1979), Slovenian racing cyclist
- Matej Hamrák (born 1987), Slovak ice hockey player
- Matej Hočevar (born 1982), Slovenian ice hockey player
- Matej Hrstić (born 1996), Croatian handball player
- Matej Juhart (born 1976), German bobsledder
- Matej Jurčo (born 1984), Slovak road bicycle racer
- Matej Kazár (born 1983), Slovak biathlete
- Matej Kristín (born 1990), Slovak ice hockey player
- Matej Krušič (born 1987), Slovenian basketball player
- Matej Kubš (born 1988), Slovak volleyball player
- Matej Kök (born 1996), Slovenian volleyball player
- Matej Mamić (born 1975), Croatian basketball player
- Matej Mandić (born 2002), Bosnian-Croatian handball player
- Matej Marin (born 1980), Slovenian racing cyclist
- Matej Medveď (1996–2020), Slovak sport shooter
- Matej Mohorič (born 1994), Slovenian road racing cyclist
- Matej Mugerli (born 1981), Slovenian road bicycle racer
- Matej Mészáros (born 1982), Slovak sport shooter
- Matej Paločko (born 1996), Slovak ice hockey player
- Matej Paták (born 1990), Slovak volleyball player
- Matej Paulovič (born 1995), Slovak ice hockey player
- Matej Poliak (born 1993), Slovak judoka
- Matej Prelog (born 1980), Slovenian rower
- Matej Rojc (born 1993), Slovenian basketball player
- Matej Rudan (born 2001), Croatian basketball player
- Matej Sabanov (born 1992), Serbian tennis player
- Matej Šebenik (born 1983), Slovenian chess player
- Matej Silecky (born 1994), American figure skater
- Matej Soklič (born 1973), Slovenian cross-country skier
- Matej Stare (born 1978), Slovenian racing cyclist
- Matej Tomek (born 1997), Slovak ice hockey player
- Matej Tóth (born 1983), Slovak race walker
- Matej Venta (born 1984), Slovenian basketball player
- Matej Vidović (born 1993), Croatian alpine skier
- Matej Žagar (born 1983), Slovenian motorcycle speedway rider

== Other ==
- Matej (bishop) (fl. 1375–1392), Croatian-Bosnian Catholic prelate
- Matej Accetto, Slovenian judge
- Matej Arčon (born 1972), Slovenian politician
- Matej Bor (1913–1993), Slovenian poet, translator, playwright and partisan
- Matej Cifra (born 1979), Slovak television presenter
- Matej Cigale (1819–1889), Slovenian lawyer, linguist and editor
- Matej Čurko (1968–2011), Slovak serial killer
- Matej Kocak (1882–1918), United States Marine Corps sergeant
- Matej Mináč (born 1961), Slovak film director
- Matej Ninoslav (died 1250), Ban of Bosnia
- Matej Pavšič, Slovenian theoretical physicist
- Matej Sternen (1870–1949), Slovenian Impressionist painter
- Matej Tonin (born 1983), Slovenian politician
- Matej Andraž Vogrinčič (born 1970), Slovenian artist
- Matej Zatlkaj, Slovak Magic: The Gathering player and commentator

== See also ==
- Julija Matej (1925–2012), Serbian discus thrower
- Sveti Matej, village in Croatia
- Mate (given name)
- Matija
- Mateja
