= Mateusz Urbański =

Polish footballer

Personal information
- Full name: Mateusz Urbański
- Date of birth: 10 March 1990 (age 36)
- Place of birth: Maków Podhalański, Poland
- Height: 1.83 m (6 ft 0 in)
- Position: Defender

Youth career
- Halniak Maków Podhalański
- 2006: Cracovia

Senior career*
Years	Team	Apps	(Gls)
2006–2007	Cracovia II		
2007–2011	Cracovia	6	(0)
2010–2011	→ Okocimski KS (loan)	25	(1)
2011–2013	Okocimski KS	36	(1)
2013–2014	Pogoń Siedlce	38	(2)
2014–2015	Limanovia Limanowa	5	(0)
2015–2017	Podhale Nowy Targ		
- * Club domestic league appearances and goals

Mateusz Urbański (born 10 March 1990) is a Polish former professional footballer who played as a defender.

During the 2012–13 season, Urbański moved from Okocimski KS to I liga club Pogoń Siedlce. On 29 July 2014, he joined II liga side Limanovia Limanowa. In early 2015, he signed with fourth division outfit Podhale Nowy Targ.

== Honours ==
Okocimski KS

- II liga East: 2011–12
