= Mateusz Siebert =

Polish footballer (born 1989)

Personal information
- Full name: Mateusz Filip Siebert
- Date of birth: 4 April 1989 (age 37)
- Place of birth: Poznań, Poland
- Height: 1.85 m (6 ft 1 in)
- Position: Centre-back

Youth career
- Metz

Senior career*
Years	Team	Apps	(Gls)
2008–2010	Metz	1	(0)
2009–2010	→ Arka Gdynia (loan)	17	(0)
2010	Metz B	9	(1)
2011–2012	Arka Gdynia	11	(0)
2013–2022	US Rumelange	143	(1)
Total		181	(2)

International career
2008	Poland U19	1	(0)
2009–2010	Poland U21	6	(0)
- * Club domestic league appearances and goals

Mateusz Filip Siebert (born 4 April 1989) is a Polish former professional footballer who played as a centre-back.

== Early life ==
Born in Poland, he moved to France with his family at the age of three. His father Bernard is a former professional Polish footballer and his mother Renata a former handball player. He acquired French nationality on 3 November 1998, through the collective effect of his father's naturalization.

== Career ==
=== Club ===
He made his Ligue 2 debut in October 2008, coming on as a 25th-minute substitute against LB Châteauroux. In July 2009 he joined Arka Gdynia on a one-year loan with a buy option. His season ended in March as a result of injury. Despite wishing to retain him, the small club did not take up the buy option due to cost.

In February 2011, he joined Arka Gdynia on a two-and-a-half-year contract.

=== International ===
Siebert was a part of the Poland U-21 team.
