= Mate (given name) =

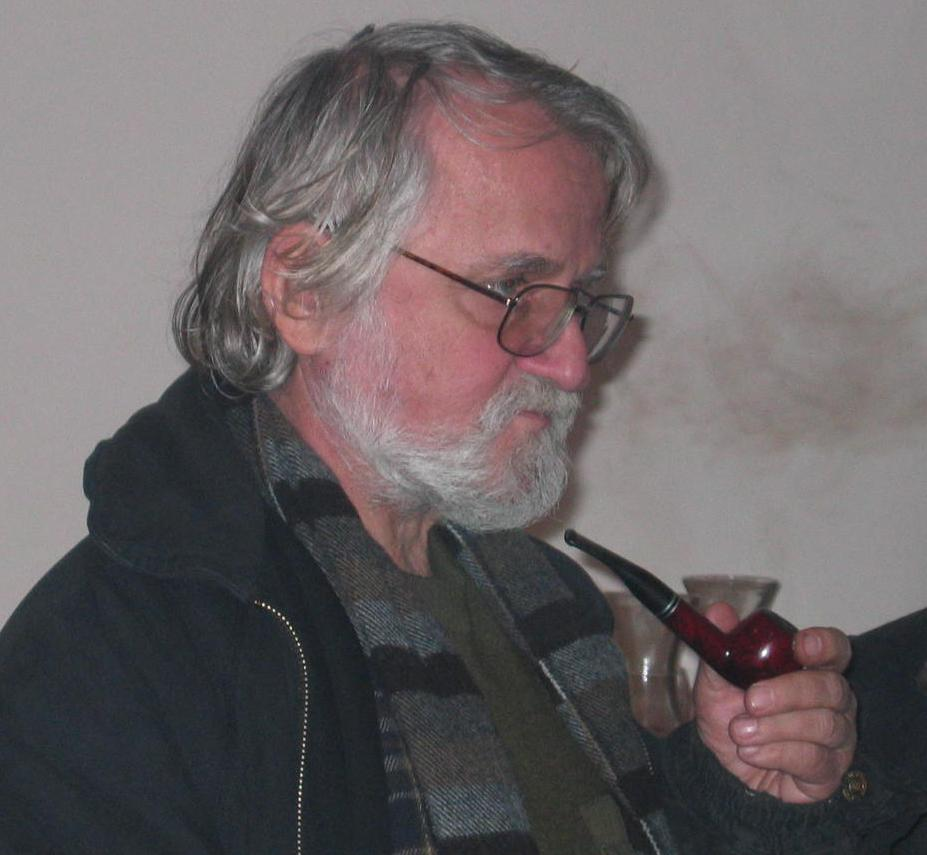
Mate Dolenc, a Slovenian writer and translator

Mate (Croatian pronunciation: [mǎːte]) is a Croatian given name, Matej is a variant of Matthew. Notable people with the name include:

- Mate Balota (1898–1963), Croatian poet, novelist and economist
- Mate Baturina (born 1973), Croatian football striker
- Mate Bilić (born 1980), Croatian football striker
- Mate Boban (1940−1997), Croatian politician
- Mate Božić (born February 28, 1981.), Croatian historian, writer and author
- Mate Brajković (born 1981), Croatian football striker
- Mate Bulić (born 1957), Croatian pop and folk singer
- Mate Delić (born 1993), Croatian tennis player
- Mate Dragičević (born 1979), Croatian football striker
- Mate Dugandžić (born 1989), Australian soccer player
- Mate Dujilo (born 1982), Croatian football defender
- Mate Eterović (born 1984), Croatian football forward
- Mate Ghvinianidze (born 1986), Georgian football defender
- Mate Granić (born 1947), Croatian diplomat and politician
- Mate Jakich (1940–2010), New Zealand rugby union player
- Mate Lacić (born 1980), Croatian football defender
- Mate Maleš (born 1989), Croatian football midfielder
- Mate Maras (born 1933), Croatian translator
- Mate Matišić (born 1965), Croatian playwright, screenwriter, composer and musician
- Mate Meštrović (1930–2025), Croatian-American journalist and politician
- Mate Mezulić (born 1981), Croatian bobsledder
- Mate Parlov (1948–2008), Croatian boxer
- Mate Pavić (born 1993), Croatian tennis player
- Mate Rimac (born 1988), Croatian entrepreneur
- Mate Šestan (born 1971), Croatian footballer
- Mate Trojanović (1930–2015), Croatian rower
- Mate Ujević (1901–1967), Croatian writer
- Mate Vatsadze (born 1988), Georgian football forward
- Christian Mate Pulisic (born 1998), American football winger, attacking midfielder, and forward.

== See also ==
- Mate (disambiguation)
- Matej
- Matea
- Maate
