= Maciej Frączyk =

Polish internet celebrity

Niekryty Krytyk
- Born: Maciej Frączyk; 1 May 1984 (age 42); Łódź, Poland
- Occupations: Opinion journalist; radio presenter; writer; English language teacher

YouTube information
- Channel: Niekryty Krytyk
- Years active: 2009–present
- Genres: Reaction; Satire
- Writing career
- Genre: Satire
- Notable works: Zeznania Niekrytego Krytyka; Nie przejdziemy do historii; Historia wszechświata według Niekrytego Krytyka

Maciej Frączyk, better known by his online pseudonym Niekryty Krytyk (lit. 'Uncovered Critic') (born 1 May 1984 in Łódź) is a Polish internet celebrity, who owes his success to a series on YouTube called Przemyślenia Niekrytego Krytyka. In addition, he is an author, a journalist, a reviewer, a critic, and a satirist.

== Life and occupation ==
Maciej Frączyk was born in Łódź. He graduated from the English Philology Department at his hometown university and for some time he was teaching English as a tutor. Nowadays he works in the advertising business as a copywriter.

He was primarily known for his series Niekryty Krytyk on YouTube. As Frączyk admits himself, he was greatly inspired by such Internet comedians and satirists like Angry Video Game Nerd, Nostalgia Critic, and Ray William Johnson. In his show Niekryty Krytyk is noted for his grotesque sense of humor when reviewing games, books, films, TV programmes and commercials. His videos uploaded on YouTube until March 2012 were viewed more than 68 million times of which 50 million took place within a year from starting the channel. In September 2012, Niekryty Krytyk has been the most subscribed user on YouTube in Poland whilst now he holds the 10th place according to VidStatsX.

Frączyk is also the founder of an online store Modern Retro and a co-founder of the bookstore Bookiatryk.

From 10 October 2011 to June 2012 he performed for a Polish radio station 'Radio Zet' within the framework of the morning broadcast Dzień dobry bardzo, which one could listen to during weekdays. From November 2013 to June 2014 he was reinvited to host another broadcast on 'Radio Zet' called History of the world in the eyes of Niekryty Krytyk.

In 2019, he founded the English language school Happy!, where he is one of the teachers himself.

== Publications ==
In 2012, his first book, Testimony of Niekryty Krytyk, was released with the help of a Polish publisher Zielona Sowa. In 2013, a comic book written by Maciej Frączyk and illustrated by Robert Sienicki came out with the title - Ale Kino! – so what would happen if film characters were children and in autumn 2013 Frączyk's second book was published – We won't make history.

In 2014, he released the third volume of Testimony of Niekryty Krytyk called South of Heaven. Volume 3. Again in 2015, another book by him was published: Personal (and peculiar) non-diary of Niekryty Krytyk. In 2016, his next book appeared: Disco Polo, The Witcher and Rubber Balls – the 3rd Republic of Poland in the eyes of Niekryty Krytyk. In the very same year he published another piece of writing, this time edited by the publisher Filia, The history of the universe in the eyes of Niekryty Krytyk.
