= Vuk Matić =

Serbian musician (born 1978)

Vuk Matić (Serbian Cyrillic: Вук Матић; born 24 May 1978, in Belgrade, SR Serbia, Yugoslavia) is a Serbian bass singer, and soloist of Opera in the National Theatre in Belgrade, Serbia.

He graduated-B.A. and M.A. in solo singing at the Faculty of Music in Belgrade in the class of Professor emerita Radmila Bakočević. At the National Theatre in Belgrade he sang roles in Mozart's The Magic Flute (Papageno), Don Giovanni (Leporello), Donizetti's L'Elisir d'Amore (Dulcamara), Don Pasquale, Lucia di Lammermoor (Raimondo), Prokofiev's The Love for Three Oranges (Tchelio), Puccini's La Boheme (Schaunard and Colline), in Serbian operas, Stanislav Binički's Na uranku (At Dawn") (Redzep), Rastislav Kambasković's "Hasanaginica" (Hasanaga), and others.

Vuk Matić is also a guitarist and composer.
