= Matići =

Matići may refer to:

- Matići, Bosnia and Herzegovina, a village near Orašje
- Matići, Croatia, a village near Vrbovsko
