= Mate (company) =

Japanese manufacturer of magnetics and composites

Mate Co., Ltd.
- Native name: 株式会社メイト
- Type: Private
- Industry: Chemical industry
- Founded: August 1970; 56 years ago
- Founder: Tatsushige Akaiwa
- Headquarters: Wake, Okayama, Japan
- Key people: Shuji Akaiwa (president); Tatsushige Akaiwa (chairman)
- Products: Plastic-bonded magnet compounds; soft-magnetic compounds; electromagnetic-interference shielding compounds; high-density compounds
- Services: Moulding support
- Number of employees: 120 (April 2026)
- Subsidiaries: Shanghai Mate Trading Co., Ltd. Changshu Mate Composites Company Limited
- Website: www.mate.co.jp/en/toppage/

Mate Co., Ltd. (Japanese: 株式会社メイト) is a privately held Japanese manufacturer of magnetic and other functional composite compounds, headquartered in Wake, Okayama. Its principal products are compounds for injection- and extrusion-moulded plastic-bonded magnets, made by mixing magnetic powders with thermoplastic resins. The company also develops soft-magnetic, electromagnetic-interference shielding and lead-free high-density compounds, and provides moulding support.

== History ==
According to a 2013 case study by Okayama University researcher Hisao Tomae, founder Tatsushige Akaiwa left his employer in 1967, took over his father-in-law's sawmill and began performing contract pulverization work. This business became the basis of Mate, which was incorporated as a limited company at its present location in August 1970.

In 1984, the company began developing ferrite-based plastic-bonded magnet compounds. When its contract pulverization orders fell after a customer brought the process in-house in 1985, Mate installed mixing equipment and shifted its main business toward magnet compounds. It expanded its magnet-compound plant and research laboratory in 1987, began construction of production equipment for rare-earth magnet compounds in 1990, and reorganized as a kabushiki gaisha in 1991.

Mate established Shanghai Mate Trading Co., Ltd. in 2004 and opened its Advanced Composite Materials Research Center in 2005. It established Changshu Mate Composites Company Limited in 2011. The Create F. plant was completed in December 2021, the Fukutomi Factory began operations in November 2024, and a new office at the Yatabe Factory was completed in April 2026.

== Products and services ==
=== Plastic-bonded magnet compounds ===
Mate supplies intermediate compounds rather than finished magnet components. Customers process the compounds by injection or extrusion moulding, allowing complex shapes, two-material moulding and insert moulding. Tomae's case study identified air-conditioner fan motors, magnetic rollers for printers and photocopiers, and small automotive motors among the principal applications.

The Japanese Small and Medium Enterprise Agency described Mate's business model in 2007 as one in which the company works with customers from material selection and mould design through prototyping and evaluation, and then supplies compounds designed for the resulting magnetic component. In its 2024 annual information form, Canadian materials supplier Neo Performance Materials listed Mate among the longstanding customers of its Magnequench segment, which supplies rare-earth magnetic powders.

A 2013 study based on interviews conducted in 2012 estimated that Mate held approximately 70 percent of the Japanese market and 30 percent of the world market for ferrite-based plastic-bonded magnet compounds. In 2025, an Okayama Prefecture industrial profile also described the company as the leading domestic supplier of plastic-bonded magnet materials.

=== Other functional compounds ===
The company's core processes include powder-size adjustment, surface treatment and the dispersion of functional fillers in thermoplastic resins. Its other products include soft-magnetic compounds, electromagnetic-interference shielding materials and lead-free high-density compounds. In 2002, Mate and Kitagawa Industries expanded a collaboration to commercialize injection-moldable electromagnetic-wave-absorbing components. In 2022, it began offering samples of a soft-magnetic metal flake powder intended for automotive and 5G-related applications.

== Research and international activities ==
Mate and Okayama University studied the relationship between the crystal structure and electromagnetic-wave absorption properties of Y-type hexagonal ferrite, using high-resolution powder neutron diffraction to examine the distribution of metal ions in samples produced under different conditions. In 2019, researchers at ETH Zurich and other institutions reported fused-deposition modelling and magnetic characterization using three of the company's hard- and soft-magnetic thermoplastic compounds.

In 2023, a Mate project covering Vietnam and Japan was selected for the Japan External Trade Organization's overseas supply-chain diversification programme. The project concerned the development of injection-moulding bonded-magnet compounds using a new magnetic-powder composition.

All of the domestic facilities listed by the company are located in Wake. Its overseas subsidiaries are Shanghai Mate Trading Co., Ltd. and Changshu Mate Composites Company Limited. Mate identifies HAWA – Magnetische und leitfähige Werkstoffe, based in Monheim am Rhein, Germany, as its distributor for Europe. HAWA lists Mate among its Japanese manufacturing partners. The S&P Global trade database Panjiva lists 2025 United States-bound shipments from the company's Wake address, with ferrite among the products associated with the supplier record.
