= Mateo Rosas de Oquendo =

Peruvian satirist

Mateo Rosas de Oquendo (ca. 1559–1612) was viceregal Peru's earliest satirist. Born in Spain, he travelled to the New World where he served as Secretary to the Viceroy García Hurtado de Mendoza. Notarial documentation shows him as engaged in the conquest of Tucumán, where he is named Accountant of Royal Finances and founds the city of La Rioja. He was also a land grantee in Canchanga and Camiquín. He probably left Peru and settled in Mexico around 1598.

His works are found mainly in two manuscripts, one at the National Library of Spain in Madrid (MS 19381) and the other, Ms. Codex 193, at the Library of the University of Pennsylvania.

== Bibliography ==
Lasarte, Pedro. Mateo Rosas de Oquendo. Obra completa y poemas relacionados (Lima: Universidad Ricardo Palma / Editorial Universitaria, 2019).

- Lasarte, Pedro. Ed., Sátira hecha por Mateo Rosas de Oquendo a las cosas que pasan en el Pirú, año de 1598. Estudio y edición crítica (Madison: HSMS, 1990).
- Lasarte, Pedro. Lima satirizada (1598-1698): Mateo Rosas de Oquendo y Juan del Valle y Caviedes (Lima: PUCP, 2006)
- Reyes, Alfonso. "Sobre Mateo Rosas de Oquendo, poeta del siglo XVI." Revista de filología española, 6 (1917), 341-70.
