= Mateusz Szałek =

Polish footballer

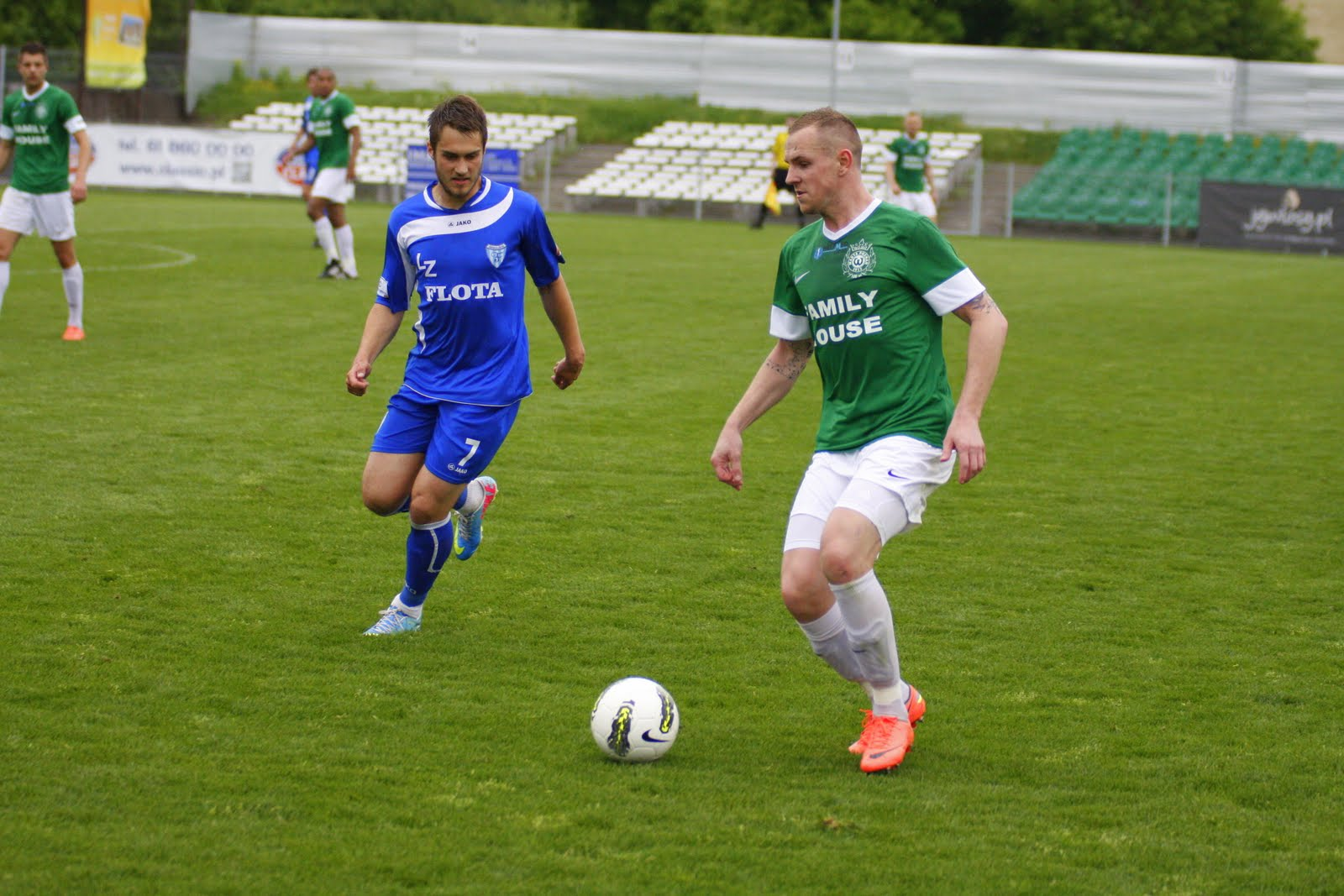
- Mateusz Szałek (left)

Personal information
- Full name: Mateusz Szałek
- Date of birth: 16 October 1991 (age 35)
- Place of birth: Szczecin, Poland
- Height: 1.80 m (5 ft 11 in)
- Position: Midfielder

Youth career
- 2007: KP Police
- 2007–2008: Amica Wronki
- 2008: Lech Poznań

Senior career*
Years	Team	Apps	(Gls)
2008–2010	Lech Poznań	1	(0)
2008–2009	→ Chemik Police (loan)	22	(1)
2010	Odra Wodzisław	14	(0)
2011–2014	Pogoń Szczecin	33	(0)
2013	→ Flota Świnoujście (loan)	22	(0)
2014	Skra Częstochowa	14	(1)
2014–2015	Chrobry Głogów	10	(0)
2015–2018	Robertsfors IK	56	(23)
2018	Unia Solec Kujawski	12	(0)
2018	Unia Janikowo	6	(2)
2019	Adelövs IK	11	(5)
2019	SV Blau-Weiss '90 Neustadt		

International career
	Poland U19	5	(0)
- * Club domestic league appearances and goals

Mateusz Szałek (Polish pronunciation: [ma.ˈtɛu̯ʂ ˈʂa.wɛk]; born 16 October 1991) is a Polish former professional footballer who played as a midfielder.

== Career ==
=== Club ===
Szałek began his football career in KP Police where he played for youth team. In 2007, he moved to Amica Wronki. In 2008, Szałek played for Chemik Police. In the 2008–09 season, he made 22 appearances and scored one goal. Then he was transferred to Lech Poznań.

On 12 December 2009, he made his Ekstraklasa debut for Lech in 2–0 win over Korona Kielce.

=== International ===
Szałek made five appearances for the Poland U19 national team.

== Personal life ==
Szałek has three brothers who also are footballers – Jakub, Cezary and Michał.

== Honours ==
Lech Poznań

- Ekstraklasa: 2009–10

Skra Częstochowa

- III liga Opole-Silesia (North): 2013–14
