= Matěj Paprčiak =

Czech footballer, model, and actor

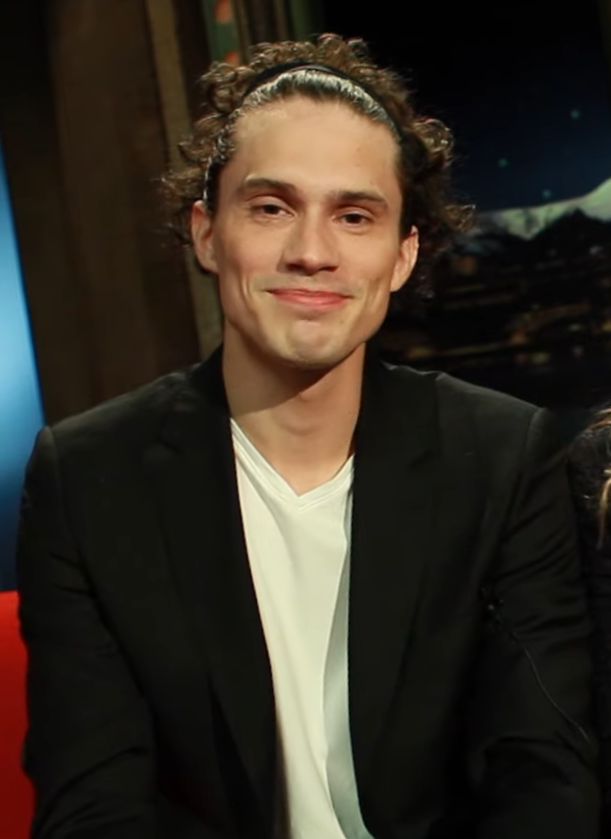
- Paprčiak in 2022

Personal information
- Date of birth: 3 May 1991 (age 35)
- Place of birth: Czechoslovakia
- Position: Forward

Senior career*
| Years | Team | Apps | (Gls) |
| 2011–15 | Slavia Prague | 6 | (0) |
| 2012–13 | → Králův Dvůr (loan) | | |
| 2013 | → Viktoria Žižkov (loan) | | |
| 2014 | → Admira Prague B (loan) | 4 | (2) |
- * Club domestic league appearances and goals as of 31 December 2014

Matěj Paprčiak (born 3 May 1991) is a Czech former footballer who is currently a model and actor. He began his career at Slavia Prague and made his Gambrinus liga debut for Slavia against Dukla Prague on 16 September 2011. He was then loaned out to various clubs including ČFL (tier 3) side FK Králův Dvůr, Viktoria Žižkov and Admira Prague.

Paprčiak retired following a ligament injury. He then became a model and actor.
