= Matija =

- Pronunciation: Serbo-Croatian pronunciation: [mǎtija]
- Gender: male
- Language: Slovenian, Croatian, Serbian

Origin
- Derivation: from the name Matthias

Other names
- Related names: Mattia, Mateja, Matej, Matei, Maciej, Matic, Matthew

Matija (Serbian: Матија) is a South Slavic masculine given name. It is a variant of the given name Matthias used in Slovenia, Croatia and Serbia, and thus a cognate to the English name Matthew.

== Notable people with the name ==
- Matija Ahacel (1779–1845), Carinthian Slovene philologist, publicist, and collector of folk songs
- Matija Antun Relković (1732–1798), Habsburg military officer and Croatian writer
- Matija Babić (born 1978), Croatian journalist and entrepreneur
- Matija Ban (1818–1903), Serbian poet, dramatist, and playwright
- Matija Barl (1940–2018), Slovene actor, producer and translator
- Matija Bertolloti, Slovenian politician
- Matija Bećković (born 1939), Serbian writer and poet
- Matija Boben (born 1994), Slovenian footballer
- Matija Bravničar (1897–1977), Slovenian composer
- Matija Čanić (1901–1964), Croatian military officer
- Matija Češković (born 1981), Croatian basketball player
- Matija Christian, Slovenian politician
- Matija Čop (1797–1835), Slovene linguist, literary historian and critic
- Matija Črep, Croatian taekwondo practitioner
- Matija Cvek (born 1993), Croatian singer and songwriter
- Matija Dedić (1973–2025), Croatian jazz pianist and composer
- Matija Di Georgio, Slovenian politician
- Matija Divković (1563–1631), Bosnian Franciscan writer
- Matija Duh (1989–2013), Slovenian motorcycle speedway rider
- Matija Đulvat (born 1976), Croatian futsal player
- Matija Dvorneković (born 1989), Croatian footballer
- Matija Frigan (born 2003), Croatian footballer
- Matija Gluščević (born 2004), Serbian footballer
- Matija Gogala (born 1937), Slovene entomologist
- Matija Golik (born 1993), Croatian handballer
- Matija Gočmanac (born 2003), Serbian footballer
- Matija Grbić (1505–1559), German humanist, classical philologist and translator
- Matija Gregurić (born 1996), Croatian hammer thrower
- Matija Gubec (c. 1548–1573), Croatian revolutionary
- Matija Horvat (born 1999), Croatian footballer
- Matija Ivanić (1445–1523), leader of the Hvar Rebellion
- Matija Jama (1872–1947), Slovene painter
- Matija Jovičić (1755–1820), Serbian village mayor and revolutionary
- Matija Jurišić (born 2003), Croatian racing driver
- Matija Katanec (born 1990), Croatian footballer
- Matija Kluković (born 1982), Croatian independent film director
- Matija Kovač (born 8 April 1980), Serbian politician
- Matija Kranjc (born 1984), Slovenian javelin thrower
- Matija Kristić (born 1978), Croatian footballer
- Matija Krivokapić (born 2003), Montenegrin footballer
- Matija Kvasina (born 1981), Croatian racing cyclist
- Matija Legović (born 2005), Croatian biathlete
- Matija Ljubek (1953–2000), Croatian sprint canoeist
- Matija Ljujić (born 1993), Serbian footballer
- Matija Majar (1809–1892), Slovene Roman Catholic priest and political activist
- Matija Malekinušić (born 1999), Croatianfootballer
- Matija Matko (born 1982), Croatian footballer
- Matija Mazarek (1726–1808) Catholic priest
- Matija Mažuranić (1817–1881), Croatian writer
- Matija Mesić (1826–1878), Croatian historian and professor
- Matija Mišić (born 1992), Croatian football
- Matija Mitrović (born 2004), Serbian footballer
- Matija Muhar (born 1996), Slovenian track and field athlete
- Matija Murko (1861–1952), Slovene scholar
- Matija Nastasić (born 1993), Serbian footballer
- Matija Nenadović (1777–1854), Serbian archpriest
- Matija Pavšič (born 1979), Slovenian rower
- Matija Pecotić (born 1989), Croatian tennis player
- Matija Petar Katančić (1750–1825), Croatian writer, professor of aesthetics and archaeology, and lexicographer
- Matija Pintarič (born 1989), Slovenian ice hockey player
- Matija Popović (c. 1490–1563), Serbian Orthodox priest from Ottoman Bosnia
- Matija Popović (footballer) (born 2006), Serbian footballer
- Matija Prskalo (born 1966), Croatian actress
- Matija Radović (born 1998), Serbian basketball player
- Matija Rom (born 1998), Slovenian footballer
- Matija Sabančić (fl. 1463–1471), King of Bosnia
- Matija Sarkic (1997–2024), English-Montenegrin footballer
- Matija Šestak (born 1972), Slovenian sprinter
- Matija Širok (born 1991), Slovenian footballer
- Matija Škarabot (born 1988), Slovenian footballer
- Matija Škerbec (1886–1963), Slovene Roman Catholic priest, political figure, and writer
- Matija Skurjeni (1898–1990), Croatian painter
- Matija Špičić (born 1988), Croatian footballer
- Matija Špoljarić (born 1997), Cypriot footballer
- Matija Smrekar (born 1989), Croatian footballer
- Matija Sovdat (born 1975), Swedish murderer
- Matija Vojsalić, member of the Bosnian Hrvatinić noble family
- Matija Vuković (1925–1985), Serbian sculptor
- Matija Zmajević (1680–1735), Russian admiral and shipbuilder

== See also ==
- Mateja
- Matej
- Matyáš
- Mate (given name)
- Matijević
