= Mateusz Cieluch =

Polish footballer

Personal information
- Full name: Mateusz Cieluch
- Date of birth: 21 October 1987 (age 39)
- Place of birth: Siemianowice Śląskie, Poland
- Height: 1.75 m (5 ft 9 in)
- Position: Striker

Youth career
- Stadion Śląski Chorzów
- Jagiellonia Białystok

Senior career*
Years	Team	Apps	(Gls)
2005	Wierna Małogoszcz		
2006	KS Paradyż		
2006–2007	Jagiellonia Białystok	17	(0)
2008	Polonia Bytom (ME)	9	(4)
2009	Odra Opole	11	(0)
2009	GKS Katowice	3	(0)
2010	Podbeskidzie Bielsko-Biała	3	(0)
2010–2012	Ruch Radzionków	38	(1)
2012	LZS Piotrówka	15	(1)
2013–2015	Odra Opole	47	(2)
2015–2016	LZS Piotrówka		
2017–2019	Unia Kosztowy		
- * Club domestic league appearances and goals

Mateusz Cieluch (born 21 October 1987) is a Polish former professional footballer who played as a striker.

== Career ==
In the summer 2010, he moved to Ruch Radzionków from Podbeskidzie Bielsko-Biała.

== Honours ==
Odra Opole

- III liga Opole–Silesia: 2012–13

Unia Kosztowy

- Regional league Katowice I: 2017–18
