= Piotr i Paweł =

Polish supermarket chain

- Company type: Joint-stock company
- Industry: Retail
- Founded: 1990; 36 years ago
- Founders: Piotr Woś, Paweł Woś, Eleonora Woś
- Defunct: End of 2019
- Fate: Bankruptcy, liquidation and acquisition by Spar
- Headquarters: Poznań, Poland
- Number of locations: Less than 70 (2019)
- Area served: Poland
- Key people: Maciej Stoiński
- Revenue: zl 2.123 billion
- Net income: zl 514 million (2016)
- Number of employees: 4000 (2010)
- Website: www.piotripawel.pl

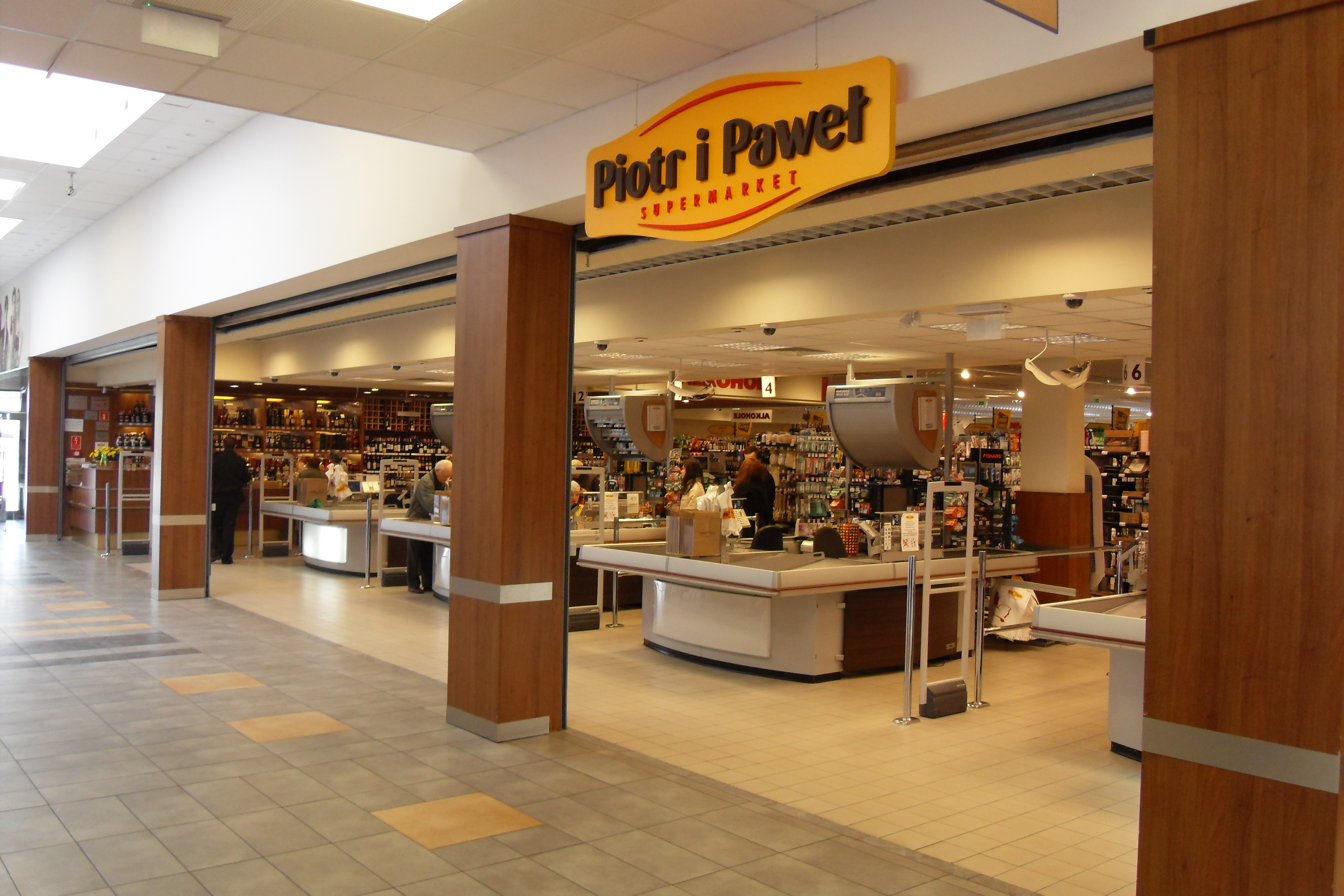
A former Piotr i Paweł location in Gdańsk

Piotr i Paweł was a retail chain of delicatessen and supermarket stores. The retail chain was founded in 1990 by Eleonora Woś and her two sons, Piotr and Paweł Woś.

As of October 24, 2016, the supermarket chain had 138 stores in Poland. Since 2003, the company additionally operates an online store, available across all of Poland.

== History ==
In 1990, the brothers Piotr and Paweł Woś opened their first grocery store by Głogowska Street in Poznań. The name for the retail chain Piotr i Paweł reflects the first names of the two founders, as well as being the names of the two patron saints of Poznań: St. Peter and St. Paul. Their second store was opened in Stare Zegrze, an eastern borough located in Poznań. The store had 300 square metres (3,200 ft^{2})of floor space. The popularity of the store came about due to its supply of imported goods from Germany.

The late 1990s and the first decade of the twenty-first century saw the continued expansion of the company. As of 2011, the company planned to expand its retail chain via 10 new stores annually. Between 2011 and 2016, 57 new stores were opened. In 2016, the company received the award of the Market of the Year for the "best quality of fresh produce". The company opened 11 stores across Poland in 2016. All shops were scheduled to rebrand as SPAR at the end of 2020. The first store to change is in Blue City, Warsaw.

== Structure ==
The Piotr i Paweł supermarket retail chain holds three logistics and distribution warehouses in:

- Koninko
- Gądki
- Stare Gnatowice
