= Svetlana Matić =

Serbian writer (born 1966)

- Светлана Матић
- Born: June 19, 1966 (age 60); Belgrade, SFR Yugoslavia
- Education: Bachelor of Pedagogy
- Occupations: Writer and pedagogue
- Writing career
- Language: Serbian, German
- Notable works: Naš jezik Pevam danju, pevam noću Srbi u Austriji
- Website: www.svetlanamatic.com

Svetlana Matić (Serbian Cyrillic: Светлана Матић, Serbian pronunciation: [sʋɛ̌tlana mǎːtitɕ]; born June 19, 1966) is a Serbian writer and pedagogue. She writes poetry, prose, and textbooks in Serbian and German language and teaches Bosnian, Croatian and Serbian in Viennese schools.

== Biography ==
In Belgrade, Svetlana graduated from the University of Belgrade Pedagogical Academy in 1987 and from the Faculty of Philosophy in 1993. She also holds a diploma from the Theological and Pedagogical College in Strebersdorf, thus earned her the title of Teacher of Orthodox Religion in 2014. Besides that, Svetlana is a licensed insurance agent for work in Serbia, Croatia, and Austria.

After she gained work experience within her own profession in primary schools "Vuk Karadžić" in Ripanj and "Filip Filipović" in Belgrade, Svetlana went to Vienna, where she has worked for ten years as a marketing manager at Radio Telephone 1510 – one of the most famous Serbian media in Austria. Today, she is engaged as a pedagogical adviser at the School Directorate of the City of Vienna, at the Fabe counseling center, in which she is in charge for migrant children from the former Yugoslavia, who have learning and behavioral difficulties.

Svetlana often participates in professional and scientific conferences and is an associate of pedagogical scientific journals such as Učitelj, Prosvetni pregled, Nastava i vaspitanje, Spoji etc.

She has written 11 textbooks, and books of poetry and prose and is a regular member of the Association of Writers of Serbia, Matica srpska, Association "Milutin Milanković", SPKD "Prosvjeta" Austria, Association of Writers "Sedmica" from Frankfurt, a corresponding member of the Department of Social Sciences of the Serbian Royal Academy of Innovation Sciences (SKAIN), and the vice president of the Association "Vukova porodica". She is the founder and the first president of the Austrian and Serbian Cultural Society "Vilhelmina Mina Karadžić" as well.

She lives and works in Vienna.

== Bibliography ==
=== Textbooks ===
- Naš jezik, spelling book (Prosvetni pregled, Belgrade, 2010)
- Nastavni listovi za nastavu na maternjem jeziku (Prosvetni pregled, Belgrade, 2010)
- Taufe als Thema im orthodoxen Religionsunterricht (Akademikerverlag, Saarbrücken, 2015)

=== Poetry and Prose ===
- Dečji biseri, reading book (author's edition, Belgrade, 2011)
- Igra – Knjiga za decu i odrasle, poetry (author's edition, Belgrade, 2013)
- O ljubavi s ljubavlju – Dečji iskazi i aforizmi o ljubavi, co-author: Aleksandar Čotrić (Pčelica, Čačak, 2014)
- Majka – Pesme za decu i odrasle / Mutter – Gedichte für Kinder und Erwachsene, poetry in Serbian and German (author's edition, Vienna, 2016)
- Pevam danju, pevam noću – Pisma Mini Karadžić (Banat Cultural Center, Novo Miloševo i SPKD "Prosvjeta" Austria, Vienna, 2018)
- Ich dichte am Tag, dichte in der Nacht – Briefe an Mina Karadžić (Jugoslovensko-nemačko kulturno-umetničko društvo "Hilden", Hilden, 2018)
- Pozdrav Milici Stojadinović Srpkinji, biography (Prometej, Novi Sad, 2019)
- Srbi u Austriji, monograph, co-author: Marko Lopušina (Prometej, Novi Sad, 2019)

== Awards and recognitions ==
- At the 7th Vukov Pedagoški Sabor in Tršić in 2009 Svetlana Matić received the prestigious recognition Vukova Povelja, which was assigned to her by Pedagoški pokret Srbije for the outstanding achievements in the development of education and national culture.
- She is also a laureate of the Award "Rastko Petrović" for 2018 by the Matica iseljenika i Srba u regionu, for the Pevam danju, pevam noću – Pisma Mini Karadžić.
