= Mateo Gil (conquistador) =

Spanish conquistador

Alcalde of Santa Fe
- In office 1576–1576
- Monarch: Philip II of Spain

Personal details
- Born: c. 1540 Jaraicejo, Cáceres, Extremadura, Spain
- Died: 1590s Santa Fe, Argentina
- Occupation: army officer; politician

Military service
- Allegiance: Spanish Empire
- Branch/service: Spanish Army

Mateo Gil (c. 1540–1590s) was a Spanish conquistador, who served as alcalde and regidor of Santa Fe, Argentina, during the Viceroyalty of Peru.

Born in Jaraicejo, Gil had arrived at Río de la Plata in the expedition of Álvar Núñez Cabeza de Vaca. In 1573, he participated in the delegation led by Juan de Garay to found Santa Fe and is named as one of the settlement's first regidores.

Mateo Gil also participated in the wars against the indigenous Charrúa people, he is remembered for his extreme cruelty. Although contemporary references don't support this claim.
