= Mate Dujilo =

Croatian footballer (born 1982)

Personal information
- Date of birth: 16 October 1982 (age 44)
- Place of birth: Zadar, SFR Yugoslavia
- Height: 1.90 m (6 ft 3 in)
- Position: Defender

Youth career
- –2001: Zadar

Senior career*
Years	Team	Apps	(Gls)
2001–2002	Novalja	14	(4)
2002–2007	Zadar	77	(7)
2009–2010	Mariehamn	39	(1)
2011	MyPa	8	(1)
2012	Alta	27	(3)
2013	Víkingur Ólafsvík		
2014	Motala	8	(0)
Total		173	(16)
- * Club domestic league appearances and goals

Mate Dujilo (born 16 October 1982) is a Croatian retired footballer who playied for Alta IF in Adeccoligaen in Norway.

== Club career ==
He joined Alta IF after a short spell with Finnish Veikkausliiga club MyPa.

Dujilo signed with Icelandic side Víkingur Ólafsvík in May 2013.
