= Matijević =

Matijević or Matijevic (Serbian Cyrillic: Матијевић) is a South Slavic surname derived from masculine given name Matija, cognate of "Matthew" (compare English Matheson). It may refer to:

- Egon Matijevic (1922–2016), American chemist
- J. J. Matijevic (born 1995), American baseball player
- Jacob Matijevic (1947–2012), Croatian American robotics engineer
- Miljenko Matijevic (born 1964), Croatian American rock singer
- Slobodan Matijević (born 1988), Serbian bobsledder
- Vladimir Matijević (1854–1929), Serbian entrepreneur
- Vladimir Matijević (footballer) (born 1957), Bosnian football player
