= Máté (surname) =

Máté (pronounced [ˈmaːteː]) is a surname of Hungarian origin. Notable people with the surname include:

- Aaron Maté (born 1979), Canadian journalist
- Dia Maté (born 2001), Filipino singer and Reina Hispanoamericana 2025
- Daniel Maté (born c. 1963), Spanish businessman
- Gabor Maté (born 1944), Hungarian-born Canadian physician
- Gábor Máté (actor) (born 1955), Hungarian actor and film director
- Gábor Máté (athlete) (born 1979), Hungarian discus thrower
- Ilya Mate (born 1956), Soviet Ukrainian wrestler
- János Máté (born 1990), Hungarian footballer
- Ferenc Máté (born 1945), Hungarian author
- Péter Máté (1947–1984), Hungarian singer, composer, and pianist
- Péter Máté (footballer, born 1979), Hungarian footballer
- Péter Máté (footballer, born 1984), Hungarian footballer
- Rudolph Maté (1898–1964), Austro-Hungarian film director
- Sébastien Maté (born 1972), French footballer
- Tibor Máté (1914–2007), Hungarian handballer
- Vasily Mate (1856–1917), Russian artist and engraver

== See also ==
- Máté (given name)
