= Slobodan Macura Bondo =

Yugoslav Partisan

- Born: Slobodan Macura; 26 April 1918; Zadar, Croatia, Austro-Hungary
- Died: 21 March 1943 (aged 24); Kalinovik, Independent State of Croatia
- Military career
- Allegiance: Yugoslav Partisans
- Service years: 1941–1943
- Nickname: Bondo
- Awards: People's Hero of Yugoslavia

Slobodan Macura (26 April 1918 – 21 March 1943), known as Bondo, was a Yugoslav Partisan and People's Hero of Yugoslavia of Croatian descent.

In 1951, Macura was awarded the title of People's Hero of Yugoslavia.

== Early life ==
Slobodan Macura was born on 26 April 1918 in Zadar, Croatia (then Austria-Hungary. He studied forestry at the University of Belgrade where he joined the Communist Party of Yugoslavia.

== World War II ==
After the German-led Axis invasion of Yugoslavia, Macura joined the Yugoslav Partisans in 1941. Soon after he returned to political work in northern Dalmatia. There, in May 1942, he became a party leader and deputy political commissar of the First North Dalmatian Battalion. In July 1942, Slobodan was appointed political commissar of the "Branko Vladušić" battalion, which joined the 2nd Dalmatian Brigade in 1942. He participated in the Battle of Neretva in 1943. He was wounded and killed in combat on 21 March 1943.

== Legacy ==
He was posthumously proclaimed a People's Hero of Yugoslavia on 5 July 1951.
