= Mateusz =

Mateusz is a Polish given name, equivalent to Hebrew names Matityahu and Matthew, meaning "gift of Yahweh".

== List ==
Notable people with the name include:

=== B–H ===
- Mateusz Bąk (born 1983), Polish football goalkeeper
- Mateusz Banasiuk (born 1985), Polish actor
- Mateusz Bartczak (born 1979), Polish footballer
- Mateusz Bartel (born 1985), Polish chess player
- Mateusz Bieniek (born 1994), Polish volleyball player
- Mateusz Biskup (born 1994), Polish rower
- Mateusz Borgiel (born 1997), Polish canoeist
- Mateusz Borkowski (born 1997), Polish middle-distance runner
- Mateusz Broź (born 1988), Polish football midfielder
- Mateusz Cetnarski (born 1988), Polish football midfielder
- Mateusz Chruściński (born 1987), Polish figure skater
- Mateusz Cichocki (born 1992), Polish footballer
- Mateusz Cieluch (born 1987), Polish footballer
- Mateusz Czunkiewicz (born 1996), Polish volleyball player
- Mateusz Damięcki (born 1981), Polish actor
- Mateusz Demczyszak (born 1986), Polish middle-distance runner
- Mateusz Didenkow (born 1987), Polish track and field athlete
- Mateusz Garniewicz (born 1980), Polish psychologist and lawyer
- Mateusz Gucman (born 1980), Polish freestyle wrestler
- Mateusz Hołownia (born 1998), Polish football defender

=== J–L ===
- Mateusz Jachlewski (born 1984), Polish handball player
- Mateusz Janik (born 1995), Polish biathlete
- Mateusz Kamiński (born 1991), Polish canoeist
- Mateusz Kijowski (born 1968), Polish journalist, social activist, and blogger
- Mateusz Klich (born 1990), Polish football midfielder
- Mateusz Komar (born 1985), Polish racing cyclist
- Mateusz Kornecki (born 1994), Polish handball player
- Mateusz Kościukiewicz (born 1986), Polish actor
- Mateusz Kossior (16th century), Polish painter and sculptor
- Mateusz Kostrzewski (born 1989), Polish basketball player
- Mateusz Kowalczyk (tennis) (born 1987), Polish tennis player
- Mateusz Kowalczyk (footballer) (born 2004), Polish football midfielder
- Mateusz Kowalski (born 1986), Polish football defender
- Mateusz Kupczak (born 1992), Polish footballer
- Mateusz Kus (born 1987), Polish handball player
- Mateusz Kusznierewicz (born 1975), Polish sailor
- Mateusz Kwiatkowski (born 1992), Polish football striker
- Mateusz Lewandowski (born 1993), Polish football midfielder
- Mateusz Ligocki (born 1982), Polish snowboarder
- Mateusz Lipa (born 1994), Polish racing cyclist
- Mateusz Lis (born 1997), Polish football goaltender
- Mateusz Łuczak (born 1990), Polish football midfielder
- Mateusz Luty (born 1990), Polish bobsledder

=== M–R ===
- Mateusz Machaj (born 1989), Polish footballer
- Mateusz Mak (born 1991), Polish footballer
- Mateusz Malinowski (born 1992), Polish volleyball player
- Mateusz Masłowski (born 1997), Polish volleyball player
- Mateusz Masternak (born 1987), Polish boxer
- Mateusz Matras (born 1991), Polish football centre back
- Mateusz Michalski (sprinter) (born 1987) Polish Paralympic sprinter
- Mateusz Michalski (swimmer) (born 1988), Polish Paralympic swimmer
- Mateusz Mika (born 1991), Polish volleyball player
- Mateusz Molęda (born 1986), German-Polish conductor
- Mateusz Morawiecki (born 1968), Polish politician and Former Prime Minister of Poland
- Mateusz Możdżeń (born 1991), Polish football midfielder
- Mateusz Mróz (born 1980), Polish cyclist
- Mateusz Musiałowski (born 2003), Polish footballer
- Mateusz Nowaczyk (born 1986), Polish football midfielder
- Mateusz Nowak (born 1992), Polish cyclist
- Mateusz Piątkowski (born 1984), Polish football striker
- Mateusz Piskorski (born 1977), Polish politician and political activist
- Mateusz Polaczyk (born 1988), Polish slalom canoeist
- Mateusz Ponitka (born 1993), Polish basketball player
- Mateusz Prus (born 1990), Polish football goalkeeper
- Mateusz Przybylko (born 1992), German high jumper
- Mateusz Rudkowski (c. 1809—c. 1887), Ukrainian-Polish composer of choral and piano music
- Mateusz Rudyk (born 1995), Polish track cyclist
- Mateusz Rutkowski (born 1986), Polish ski jumper

=== S–Z ===
- Mateusz Sawrymowicz (born 1987), Polish swimmer
- Mateusz Siebert (born 1989), Polish footballer
- Mateusz Sławik (born 1980), Polish football goalkeeper
- Mateusz Słodowy (born 1991), Polish football midfielder
- Mateusz Śmierzchalski (born 1982), Polish heavy metal musician
- Mateusz Sochowicz (born 1996), Polish luger
- Mateusz Szałek (born 1991), Polish footballer
- Mateusz Szczepaniak (footballer) (born 1991), Polish football striker
- Mateusz Szczepaniak (footballer) (born 2007), Polish football striker
- Mateusz Szczepaniak (speedway rider) (born 1987), Polish speedway rider
- Mateusz Szczurek (born 1975), Polish economist and politician
- Mateusz Szwoch (born 1993), Polish football midfielder
- Mateusz Taciak (born 1984), Polish racing cyclist
- Mateusz Taudul (born 1994), Polish football goalkeeper
- Mateusz Urbański (born 1990), Polish football defender
- Mateusz Wdowiak (born 1996), Polish football midfielder
- Mateusz Wieteska (born 1997), Polish football defender
- Mateusz Wilangowski (born 1991), Polish rower
- Mateusz Zachara (born 1990), Polish footballer
- Mateusz Zaremba (born 1984), Polish handballer
- Mateusz Zuchora (born 1992), Polish canoeist
- Mateusz Żukowski (born 2001), Polish football player
- Mateusz Żyro (born 1998), Polish football player
- Mateusz Żytko (born 1982), Polish footballer
