= Maciek Miernik =

Polish-American rock bassist

Maciek Miernik (born Maciej Stanislaw Miernik) is a bass guitar playing rock musician, composer, sound editor, recording engineer and producer. He has appeared in many groups such as Aurora, 1984, Noah-Noah, Restrykcja, Reflection-NY band, King Poyaviack, Flashback as well as producing songs ranging from progressive rock and progressive punk. He is known for his avant-garde multimedia productions.

His production credits include some of the most respected albums by Alan Lomax.

In 2003, he received an honorable mention for the Alan Lomax Archive in the 45th Grammy Trustees Award, New York City.

== See also ==
- List of Poles
- Music of Poland
