= Mateo (surname) =

Mateo is a Spanish surname, meaning Matthew. Notable people with the name include:

- Alexis Mateo (born 1979), Puerto Rican drag queen, performer, and reality television personality
- Dani Mateo (born 1979), Spanish comedian, actor and presenter of radio and television
- Daniel Mateo (born 1989), Spanish long-distance runner
- Eduardo Mateo (1940–1990), Uruguayan singer, songwriter, guitarist and arranger
- Enrique David Mateo (born 1987), Brazilian footballer
- Feleti Mateo (born 1984), Australian-Tongan rugby league player
- Francisco Mateo (1917–1979), Spanish-French footballer
- Henry Mateo (born 1976), Dominican baseball outfielder
- Irka Mateo, Dominican singer-songwriter and world music artist
- Iván Mateo (born 1981), Spanish footballer
- Jorge Mateo (born 1995), Dominican baseball shortstop
- Josep Lluis Mateo (born 1949), Spanish architect and professor
- Juan Mateo (born 1982) Dominican baseball pitcher
- Julio Mateo (born 1977), Dominican baseball pitcher
- Kike Mateo (born 1979), Spanish footballer
- Rabiya Mateo (born 1996), Indian-Filipino model and winner of Miss Universe Philippines 2020
- Raikko Mateo (born 2008), Filipino former child actor
- Ramón Mateo (born 1958), Dominican chess grandmaster
- Victor Mateo (born 1989), Dominican baseball pitcher
- Wander Mateo (born 1989), Dominican judoka

== See also ==
- Mateo (given name)
