= Ferenc Máté =

Hungarian-Canadian writer and author

- Born: 1945 (age 80–81); Hungary
- Citizenship: Canadian
- Education: University of British Columbia
- Occupation: Author
- Writing career
- Genres: Fiction, non-fiction, memoir
- Subjects: Boat building, historical fiction,
- Notable works: From a Bare Hull, A Reasonable Life, The Hills of Tuscany
- Website: www.ferencmate.com

Ferenc Máté (born 1945 in Hungarian Transylvania) grew up in Budapest. He escaped Hungary with his mother after the crushing of the 1956 revolution by Soviet tanks. He graduated from the University of British Columbia and worked on a railroad extra-gang, on tugboats, and as a boat-builder. He then became a photographer, book editor, and writer. He has lived in Vancouver, Laguna Beach, Whistler Mountain, New York City, Paris, and Rome, and now resides on a wine estate in Tuscany with his wife, painter and winemaker Candace Máté, and their son, Peter.

For much of their first twenty years together, Máté and his wife lived on sailboats, traveling, photographing and occasionally publishing books on sailing. His first book, From a Bare Hull, written when he was 28, was cited by Yachting magazine as "worthy of a much older man with a lifetime of boat-building experiences."

The first, The Hills of Tuscany (1998), was translated into 15 languages. It recounts their first three years ("Charming, …lively…Titanic in appeal," — Washington Post), while the second, A Vineyard in Tuscany, is the story of their converting an 800-year-old abandoned friary and its lands into a now world-acclaimed winery. Vineyard was cited by The New Yorker as: “muscular prose…cool, robust and determined”. It was a New York Times-notable book and was shortlisted for Spain's prestigious El Cid literary award. The third in the series, The Wisdom of Tuscany: Simplicity, Security and the Good Life (W.W. Norton & Company; 20 October 2009), examines our "chaotic, crises-driven society: and offers an alternative based on centuries-old Tuscan tradition. He emphasizes the importance of small communities and closeness to nature.

His book-length essay, A Reasonable Life (1992), was summed up by Charles Bowden, author of Desierto:

A Reasonable Life will look insane to any normal American. Which shows how crazy we've become. Read it—you might get a life.

The second volume, Sea of Lost Dreams, set in the Marquesas, was a National Geographic Travel selection. The upcoming third Sea of the Golden Dead chronicles the revolution that spanned the last days of the British Empire in Burma and Ceylon. His forthcoming non-fiction thriller The Lost City of Tuscany is a narrative of the centuries-long hunt for the treasure-laden Etruscan sanctuary of Fanum Veltha, the Etruscan's long lost, sacred city that has been an obsession of historians, archeologists, adventurers, and grave robbers since Roman times.

== Published books ==
- From A Bare Hull: How To Build A Sailboat (1975)
- Waterhouses (1977)
- The Finely Fitted Yacht: The Boat Improvement Manual, Volumes 1 and 2 (1978)
- Shipshape: Art of Sailboat Maintenance (1982)
- The World's Best Sailboats (Volume 1 1987, Volume 2 2003)
- Best Boats to Build to Build or Buy (1982)
- Seven Seas Sailors' Calendars, (annually since 1985)
- A Reasonable Life: Toward a Simpler, Secure, More Humane Existence (1992)
- The Hills of Tuscany: a new life in an old land (1998)
- Autumn: A New England Journey (2001)
- Ghost Sea: A Dugger/Nello Novel (2006)
- A Vineyard in Tuscany: A Wine Lover's Dream (2007)
- The Wisdom of Tuscany: Simplicity, Security and the Good Life (2009)
- A New England Autumn: A Sentimental Journey (2010 W.W. Norton)
- "Sea of Lost Dreams: A Dugger/Nello Novel (2011)
- "A Real Life, Restoring What Matters: Family, Good Friends and a True Community (2011)
- Islands of Eden, St Vincent and the Grenadines (2012)
- The Lost city of Tuscany (autumn 2020)
- The Power of Darkness (a novel, 2021)
- The Sea of the Golden Dead: a Dugger/Nello novel (2022)
