= Mateusz Nowaczyk =

Polish footballer

Personal information
- Date of birth: 24 October 1986 (age 40)
- Place of birth: Inowrocław, Poland
- Height: 1.80 m (5 ft 11 in)
- Position: Midfielder

Youth career
- Gopło Kruszwica

Senior career*
Years	Team	Apps	(Gls)
–2002	Gopło Kruszwica		
2004–2005	Zawisza Bydgoszcz		
2005–2006	Unia Janikowo		
2007–2008	Elana Toruń	24	(2)
2008–2009	Unia Janikowo	42	(2)
2010–2011	1920 Mosina		
2011–2012	Luboński KS		
- * Club domestic league appearances and goals

Mateusz Nowaczyk (born 24 October 1986) is a Polish former professional footballer who played as a midfielder.

== Honours ==
Luboński KS

- IV liga Greater Poland North: 2011–12
