= Mazura =

Mazura (feminine: Mazurová) is a Czech surname, meaning Masurian (a person related to Masuria). The Polish counterpart of the surname is Mazur. Notable people with the surname include:

- Josef Mazura (born 1956), Czech football player and manager
- Franz Mazura (1924–2020), Austrian opera singer and actor
- Nikola Šarounová, née Mazurová (born 1994), Czech sport shooter
