= Maciej Franz =

Polish historian

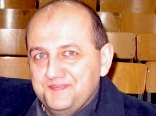

Maciej Franz (born 1969 in Toruń) is a Polish historian; the expert of the sea wars and Zaporozhian Hosts wars; professor at Adam Mickiewicz University in Poznań.

He was born in Toruń, but he moved to Poznań on the time of studies and settled here. He finished the Department of History on Adam Mickiewicz University. In 1993–2007 years taught at general education secondary school in Bolechowo near Poznań. He taught the history of the military on the department of the history in the Adam Mickiewicz University. He is the member of Instytut im. gen. Stefana Grota Roweckiego in Leszno and the solid co - worker of the quarterly "Okręty Wojenne".

In 2019 he gained the title of professor.

== Scientific titles ==
- Habilitation – (7 November 2007)
- Doctorate (since 7 June 1999): Wojskowość Kozaczyzny Zaporoskiej. (Geneza i charakter), Uniwersytet im. Adama Mickiewicza; Wydział Historyczny; Instytut Historii, 1999

== More important scientific publications ==
- Fáa di Bruno. Najbrzydszy okręt wojenny świata, Wydawnictwo Uniwersytetu im. A. Mickiewicza w Poznaniu, 2019
- Wojskowość Kozaczyzny Zaporoskiej. (Geneza i charakter), Toruń 2002
- Rosyjskie okręty lotnicze do 1941 roku, [w:] Okręty Wojenne, Tarnowskie Góry 2002;
- Bitwy pod Żółtymi Wodami i Korsuniem – kampania hetmana wielkiego koronnego Mikołaja Potockiego na Ukrainie w 1648 roku, [w:] Historia bliższa i dalsza.
- Polityka – Społeczeństwo – Wojskowość. Studia z historii powszechnej i Polski, Poznań–Kalisz 2001

== Books ==
- Wojskowość Kozaczyzny Zaporoskiej w XVI-XVII wieku
- Amerykańskie lotniskowce LEXINGTON i SARATOGA
- Mare Integrans. Studia nad dziejami wybrzeży Morza Bałtyckiego
- Idea państwa kozackiego na ziemiach ukraińskich w XVI–XVII wieku
