= Matic Sirnik =

Slovenian basketball player

KK Škofja Loka
- Position: Shooting guard
- League: 2. SKL

Personal information
- Born: January 28, 1991 (age 35) Ljubljana, SR Slovenia SFR Yugoslavia
- Listed height: 6 ft 6 in (1.98 m)

Career information
- Playing career: 2007–present

Career history
- 2006–2007: Union Olimpija 2nd team
- 2007–2009: Union Olimpija
- 2009–2012: Janče
- 2012–2013: Barcelos Hotel Terco (Portugal)
- 2013–2014: Zlatorog Laško
- 2014–2015: Slovan
- 2015–2017: Grosuplje
- 2017–2018: Mesarija Prunk Sežana
- 2018–2019: Wörthersee Piraten
- 2019–present: LTH Castings

Matic Sirnik (born January 28, 1991, in Ljubljana, SR Slovenia, SFR Yugoslavia) is a Slovenian basketball player, 2.00 m tall.

== Career ==
=== Union Olimpija ===
Sirnik began his career playing with the KK Janče and Union Olimpija as a junior.

Sirnik debuted in the UPC Telemach League in the 2007-08 season with Union Olimpija. He won the Slovenian championship and Cup with Union Olimpija that year.

He made his Euroleague debut on January 8, 2009, against Fenerbahce Ulker. First game in Euroleague he scored no points, 2 rebounds with only 17 years. He didn't play in Adriatic League, but he mad some appearances in UPC Telemach League.
