= Mateja Matejić =

Serbian American writer (1924–2018)

- Born: 19 February 1924; Smederevo, Kingdom of Serbs, Croats and Slovenes
- Died: 27 July 2018 (aged 94); Columbus, Ohio, United States
- Occupation(s): Serbian Orthodox priest, writer, and professor

Mateja Matejić (Serbian Cyrillic: Матеја Матејић; 19 February 1924 – 27 July 2018) was a Serbian American writer, translator, anthologist, Serbian Orthodox priest, and Professor Emeritus of Slavic languages and Literatures at Ohio State University.

== Biography ==
Matejić was born in Smederevo in what was then the Kingdom of Serbs, Croats and Slovenes (today Serbia) and educated there. As a seminarian at Bitola during the Axis occupation of Yugoslavia, he left the country and completed his seminary education in a displaced persons camp in Eboli, Italy. In 1949, at another camp in West Germany, he married Ljubica Nebrigić of Srem (who preceded him in death on 17 April 2016).

He was ordained as a Serbian Orthodox priest in a camp in 1951. He and his young family emigrated to the United States in 1956. As a priest, he founded two parishes and encouraged and physically contributed to the building of two places of worship, the Church of St. George in Monroe, Michigan (where he served from 1956 to 1967), and the Church of St. Stevan of Dečani in Columbus, Ohio (where he served from 1967 until his retirement in 1990).

He graduated from the University of Michigan where he received his Ph.D.

Mateja Matejić was a founder of the Hilandar Research Library scientific project at the Ohio State University in Columbus, where he taught Slavic languages since 1968. He was the first director of the Resource Center for Medieval Slavic Studies and founder and director of the publishing house Kosovo, as well as the editor of the Paths of Orthodoxy magazine. A translator and anthologist of Medieval and foreign poetry, he had also authored several books of poems and Eastern Orthodox history, two of which are acclaimed: An Anthology of Medieval Serbian Literature (as co-author) and The Holy Mount and Hilandar monastery. In September 2000 he received two awards from the Serbian Orthodox Church, the St. Sava Medal (the highest), presented to him in Ohio, and the next day a gramata from Patriarch Pavle in Belgrade.

== Works ==
- Na stazama izbeglickim: srpsko pesnistvo u izbeglistvu 1945-1968 (On Exile Paths: Serbian Poetry Diaspora 1945–1968) in Serbian co-author Bor. M. Karapandzic (1969)
- A Brief History of the Russian Orthodox Church in English
- Biography of Saint Sava in English (1976)
- An Anthology of Medieval Serbian Literature in English co-author Dragan Milivojevic (1978)
- The Holy Mount and Hilandar Monastery in English (1983)
- Relationship between the Russian and the Serbian Churches through the centuries in English (1988)
- Kosovo and Vidovdan After Six Hundred Years in English (1992)
- Troubles in Chiiandar in Serbian (1994)
- Scriptural instructions for Christian life in English (1997)
- Hilandar manuscript / Hilandarski rukopis in English and Serbian (1998)
- Remaining Unchanged in Serbian (1998)
- The oldest Christian liturgy in English (1999)
- A festschrift for Leon Twarog in English co-editor Irene Masing-Delic (2001)
