= Maciej Dziewoński =

Polish priest and spy

Maciej Dziewoński (died May 31, 1794) was a Polish priest, noted for his opposition to the Kościuszko Uprising and his espionage for the Russian Empire.

Dziewoński spoke openly against the uprising and had close ties to the number of Russian Army officers, primarily major Ignacy Parczewski, who dated his sister, Salomea.

Dziewoński informed the Russian military about the situation in the Polish camp.

After his espionage activity was uncovered, he was arrested on April 24, 1794. The court in Kraków found him guilty of high treason and sentenced him to death. After he was expelled from the church, Dziewoński was publicly beheaded by the sword in Kraków.

His sister was held in prison until the fall of the uprising. Later she married Praczewski.
