= Vlastenské Theatre =

Coordinates: 50°04′57″N 14°25′34″E

Vlastenské Theatre ('Vlastenské divadlo') was a historic theatre in Prague, active between 1786 and 1811. It was a pioneer institution as the first Czech language theatre in Prague. While the Estates Theatre occasionally gave Czech language performances from 1785 onward, the Vlastenské was the first theatre to give exclusively Czech language plays. The theatre had numerous names during its relatively short existence, and it changed building several times.

== See also ==
- Katharina Butteau
