= Maciej =

Maciej (Polish pronunciation: [ˈmat͡ɕɛj]) is a Polish given name, the etymological equivalent of Matthias.

Maciej gained popularity in the 1970s and was one of the most popular Polish male names throughout the 1980s and 90s. Its popularity declined in recent years (2020s) but in 2024, 267 723 Polish residents used that name making it the 19th most popular male name in the country.

Namedays according to Polish calendar: 30 January, 24 February, 14 May

Maciej may refer to:

== Arts and entertainment ==
- Maciej Cieślak (born 1969), Polish guitarist and songwriter
- Maciej Dunal (1953–2014), Polish actor and singer
- Maciej Fortuna (born 1982), Polish jazz trumpeter, composer and musical educator
- Maciej Frączyk (born 1984), Polish internet celebrity
- Maciej Jachowski (born 1977), Polish actor
- Maciej Kozłowski (1957–2010), Polish actor
- Maciej Łukaszczyk (1934–2014), Polish pianist
- Maciej Maleńczuk (born 1961), Polish singer, guitarist and poet
- Maciej Małecki (born 1940), Polish composer and pianist
- Maciej Musiał (born 1995), Polish actor
- Maciej Pieprzyca (born 1964), Polish fil director
- Maciej Silski (born 1976), Polish singer
- Maciej Stuhr (born 1975), Polish actor, comedian and impressionist
- Maciej Ślesicki (born 1966), Polish director and screenwriter, co-founder of the Warsaw Film School
- Maciej Wojtyszko (born 1946), Polish film director, screenwriter and fiction author
- Maciej Zembaty (1944–2011), Polish artist, writer, journalist, singer, poet and comedian

== Politics ==
- Maciej Giertych (born 1936), Polish dendrologist and social conservative politician
- Maciej Golubiewski (born 1976), Consul General of the Republic of Poland in New York City
- Maciej Górski (1944–2020), Polish politician
- Maciej Nowicki (born 1941), Polish politician, manager and scientist
- Maciej Płażyński (1958–2010), Polish politician and marshal of the Sejm
- Maciej Rataj (1884–1940), Polish politician and writer
- Maciej Świątkowski (born 1950), Polish politician, former member of the Sejm and the Senate

== Sports ==
- Maciej Bębenek (born 1984), Polish footballer
- Maciej Bielecki (born 1987), Polish cyclist
- Maciej Bodnar (born 1985), Polish road racing cyclist
- Maciej Bydliński (born 1988), Polish alpine skier
- Maciej Czyżowicz (born 1962), Polish modern pentathlete
- Maciej Dąbrowski (born 1987), Polish footballer
- Maciej Gajos (born 1991), Polish footballer
- Maciej Gębala (born 1994), Polish handball player
- Maciej Górski (born 1990), Polish footballer
- Maciej Hreniak (born 1989), Polish swimmer
- Maciej Iwański (born 1981), Polish footballer
- Maciej Janowski (born 1991), Polish speedway rider
- Maciej Jewtuszko (born 1981), Polish mixed martial artist
- Maciej Korzym (born 1988), Polish footballer
- Maciej Kot (born 1991), Polish ski jumper
- Maciej Lampe (born 1985), Polish basketball player
- Maciej Łasicki (1965–2025), Polish rower
- Maciej Pałyszko (born 1978), Polish hammer thrower
- Maciej Piaszczyński (born 1989), Polish speedway rider
- Maciej Pospieszyński, Polish glider aerobatic pilot
- Maciej Rybus (born 1989), Polish footballer
- Maciej Skorża (born 1972), Polish football manager
- Maciej Śliwa (born 2001), Polish footballer
- Maciej Staręga (born 1990), Polish cross-country skier
- Maciej Steinhof (born 1985), Polish racing driver
- Maciej Szczęsny (born 1965), Polish footballer
- Maciej Urbańczyk (born 1995), Polish footballer
- Maciej Zieba (born 1987), Polish-German footballer
- Maciej Żurawski (born 1976), Polish footballer
- Maciej Kowalczyk (born 2002), Polish-American hockey player and expert computer scientist

== Other ==
- Maciej Cegłowski, Polish-American web developer and writer, owner of the bookmarking service Pinboard
- Maciej Aleksy Dawidowski (1920–1943), Polish anti-Nazi resistance fighter
- Maciej Dziewoński (died 1794), Polish priest and Russian spy
- Maciej Franz (born 1969), Polish historian
- Maciej Ganczar (born 1976), Polish literary scholar
- Maciej Kranz (born 1964), Polish-American Silicon Valley executive
- Maciej Kuroń (1960–2008), Polish chef, culinary publicist and journalist
- Maciej Łubieński (1572–1652), primate of Poland and archbishop of Gniezno
- Maciej Miechowita (1457–1523), Polish renaissance scholar, professor of Jagiellonian University, historian, chronicler, geographer, and medical doctor
- Maciej Rybiński (1945–2009), Polish journalist, publicist, satirist and writer
- Maciej Kazimierz Sarbiewski (1595–1640), Europe's most prominent Latin poet of the 17th century
- Maciej Stachowiak (born 1976), Polish-American software developer and notable proponent for open source software and web standards, and a leader of the WebKit development team.
- Maciej Stoiński (born 1972) Polish businessman and CEO of the Piotr i Paweł supermarket chain.
- Maciej Stryjkowski (ca. 1547–1593), Polish historian
- Maciej Sulkiewicz (1865–1920), lieutenant general of the Russian Empire, Prime Minister of Crimea, and Chief of General Staff of Azerbaijani Armed Forces
- Maciej Zamoyski, Polish nobleman
- Maciej Zaremba (born 1951), Swedish journalist and author
- Maciej Zień (born 1979), Polish fashion designer
- Maciej Żurowski (1915–2003), Polish historian of French literature and translator

== See also ==
- Maciek
