= List of mayors of Ljubljana =

This is a chronological list of mayors of Ljubljana.

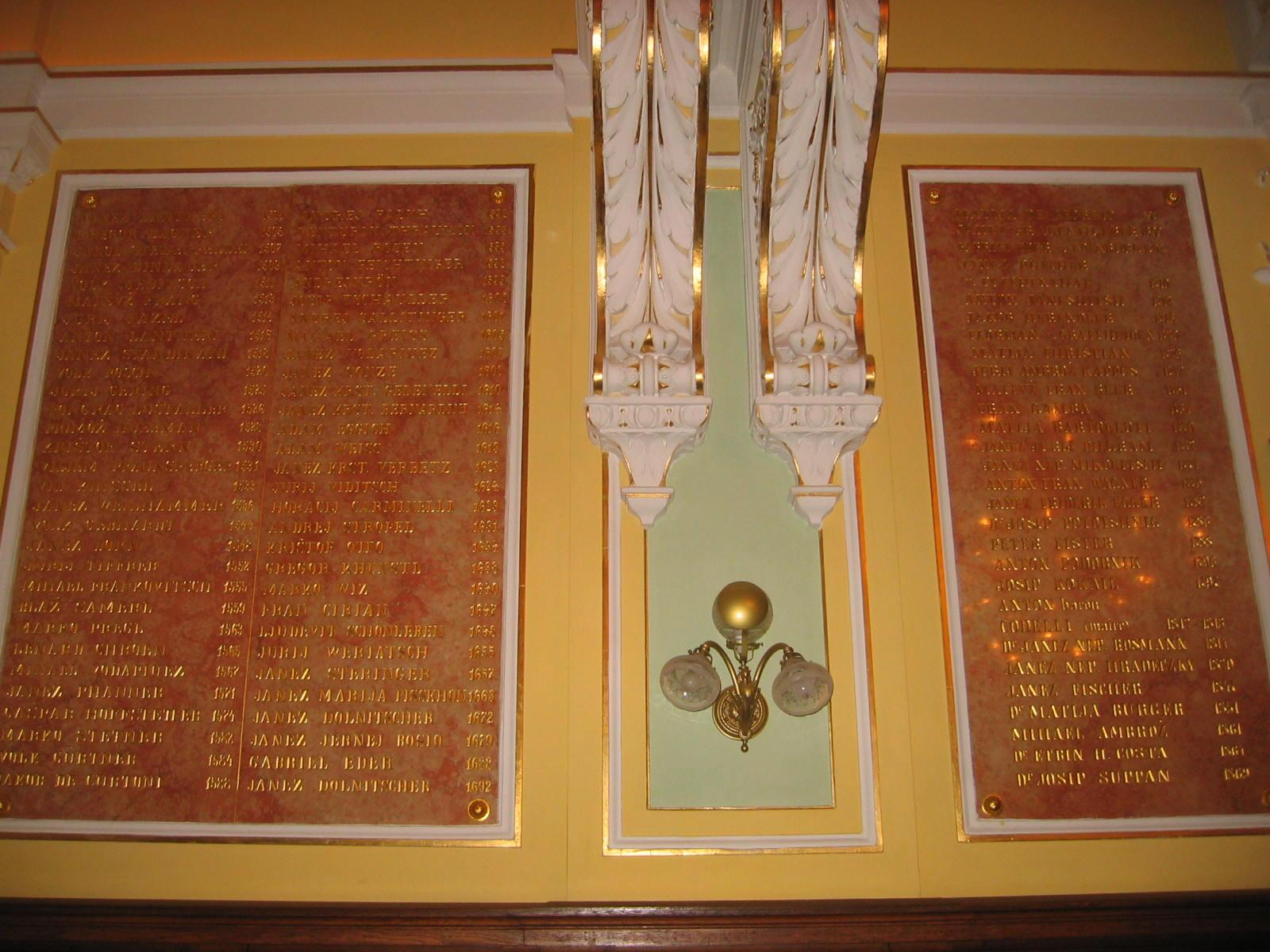
Chronological list of mayors of Ljubljana at Ljubljana Town Hall

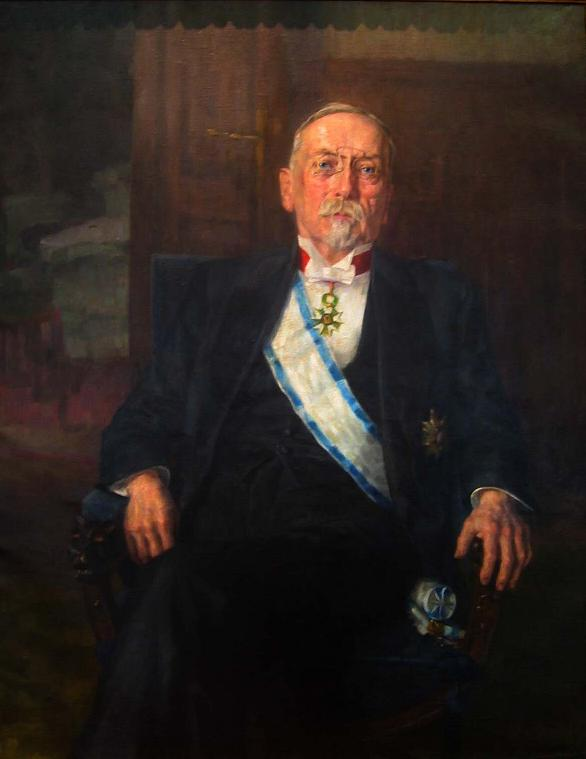
Ivan Hribar, one of the most prominent mayors of Ljubljana, portrait by Ivana Kobilca (around 1920-1926), City Museum, Ljubljana

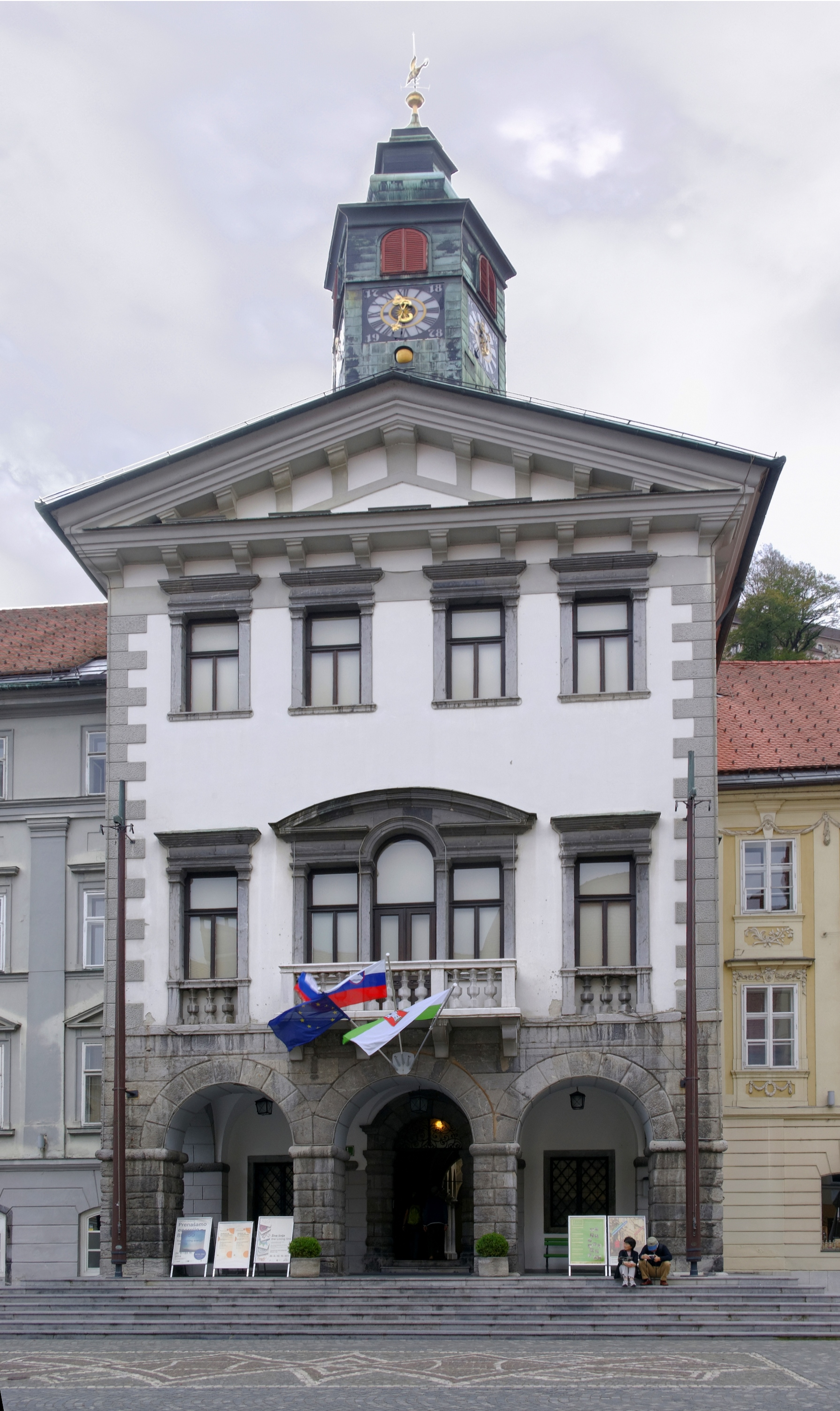
Ljubljana Town Hall – the seat of the mayor

On the list are mentioned all mayors since 1504, when Ljubljana was given the right to elect its mayor.

== 16th century ==
- Janez Lantheri (1504)
- Gregor Lagner (1505)
- Lenart Praunsperger (1506)
- Jakob Stettenfelder (1507)
- Janez Lindauer (1509)
- Volk Meditsch (1511)
- Matevž Frang (1513)
- Jurij Tazel (1514)
- Anton Lantheri (1516)
- Janez Standinath (1518)
- Volk Posch (1520)
- Jurij Gering (1524)
- Pongrac Lustaller (1526)
- Primož Huebman (1528)
- Peter Reicher (1529)
- Krištof Stern (1530)
- Wilhelm Praunsperger (1531)
- Veit Khisl (1533)
- Hans Weilhammer (1536)
- Volk Gebhardt (1544)
- Janez Dorn (1548)
- Jurij Tiffrer (1552)
- Mihael Frankovitsch (1555)
- Blaž Samerl (1559)
- Marko Pregl (1563)
- Lenard Chroen (1565)
- Mihael Vodapiuez (1567)
- Janez Phanner (1571)
- Gaspar Hoffstetter (1574)
- Marko Stetner (1582)
- Volk Guertner (1584)
- Jakob De Curtoni (1588)
- Andrej Falkh (1592)
- Venturin Thrauison (1593)
- Mihael Rosen (1595)
- Anton Feichtinger (1598)
- Andrej Kroen (1599)
- Josip Tschauller (1600)

== 17th century ==
- Andrej Sallitinger (1601)
- Mihael Preiss (1605)
- Janez Vodapiuez (1607)
- Janez Sonze (1608)
- Janez Krstnik Gedenelli (1610)
- Adam Eggich (1616)
- Adam Weiss (1619)
- Janez Krstnik Verbetz (1623)
- Jurij Viditsch (1624)
- Horacij Carminelli (1629)
- Andrej Stropel (1631)
- Kristof Otto (1634)
- Gregor Khunstl (1638)
- Marko Wiz (1640)
- Fran Cirian (1647)
- Ljudevit Schonleben (1648)
- Jurij Wertatsch (1650)
- Janez Steringer (1657)
- Janez Maria Pisckhon (1663)
- Janez Krstnik Dolnitscher (1672)
- Janez Jernej Bosio (1679)
- Gabriel Eder (1688)
- Janez Dolnitscher (1692)
- Matija Di Georgio (1697)
- Janez Graffenhueber (1699)

== 18th century ==
- Gabriel Eder (1702)
- Janez Kristof Pucher pl. Puechenthall (1710)
- Anton Janeshitsh (1712)
- Jakob Herendler (1716)
- Florijan von Grafflieiden (1720)
- Matija Christian (1726)
- Anton Raab (1738)
- Jurij Ambrož Kappus (1742)
- Matevž Fran Beer (1751)
- Fran Gamba (1764)
- Janez Mihael Kuk (1766)
- Matija Bertolloti (1770)
- Janez Jurij Pilgram (1772)
- Janez Nepomuk Mikolitsch (1774)
- Anton Fran Wagner (1775)
- Janez Friderik Egger (1782)
- Josip Pototschnig (1786)
- Peter Fister (1788)
- Anton Podobnik (1796)
- Josip Kokail (1797)

== 19th century ==
- Anton Codelli (1812)
- Janez Nepomuk Rosmann (1814)
- Johann Nepomuk Hradeczky (1820)
- Janez Fischer (1847)
- Matija Burger (1851)
- Mihael Ambrož (1861)
- Etbin Henrik Costa (1864)
- Josip Suppan (1869)
- Karl Deschmann (1871)
- Anton Laschan (1874)
- Peter Grasselli (1882)
- Ivan Hribar (1896–1910)

== 20th century ==
- Ivan Tavčar (1911–1921)
- Anton Pesek (jun 1921 - jul 1921)
- Ljudevit Perič (1921–1928)
- Dinko Puc (1928–1935)
- Vladimir Ravnihar (1935)
- Juro Adlešič (1935–1942)
- Leon Rupnik (1942–1945)
- Pavel Lunaček (1945)
- Fran Albreht (1945–1948)
- Matija Maležič (1948–1951)
- Jaka Avšič (1951–1953)
- Heli Modic (1953–1954)
- Marijan Dermastja (1954–1960)
- Marjan Jenko (1960–1961)
- Marjan Tepina (1961–1967)
- Miha Košak (1967–1973)
- Tone Kovič (1973–1978)
- Marjan Rožič (1978–1982)
- Tina Tomlje (1982–1986)
- Nuša Kerševan (1986–1990)
- Jože Strgar (1990–1994)
- Dimitrij Rupel (1994–1998)
- Vika Potočnik (1998–2002)

== 21st century ==
- Danica Simšič (2002–2006)
- Zoran Janković (17 November 2006 – 21 December 2011)
- Aleš Čerin (22 December 2011 – 11 April 2012) (acting)
- Zoran Janković (11 April 2012 – present)

== See also ==
- Timeline of Ljubljana
