= Jurij =

Jurij is a given name. Notable people with the name include:

- Jurij Alschitz (born 1947), theatre director, theatre and acting theorist who has lived in Berlin since 1992
- Jurij Brězan (1916–2006), Sorbian writer
- Jurij Cherednikov (born 1964), Ukrainian-American author and software engineer
- Jurij Dalmatin (1547–1589), Slovene Lutheran minister, writer and translator
- Jurij Fedynskyj (born 1975), Ukrainian-American folk singer, kobzar and bandurist
- Jurij Gering, politician in Slovenia during the first half of the 16th century when it was under the Holy Roman Empire
- Jurij Japelj, also known in German as Georg Japel (1744–1807), Slovene Jesuit priest, translator and philologist
- Jurij Ambrož Kappus, politician of the 18th century in Slovenia, when the country was under the Holy Roman Empire
- Jurij Koch (born 1936), Sorbian writer
- Jurij Korenjak, Slovenian slalom canoeist who competed in the early 2000s
- Jurij Lopatynsky (1906–1982), Ukrainian activist, soldier, colonel in the Ukrainian Insurgent Army
- Jurij Moškon (born 1973), Slovenian Film editor
- Jurij Moskvitin (1938–2005), classical pianist, composer, philosopher, mathematician and boheme
- Janez Jurij Pilgram, politician of the 18th century in Slovenia, when the country was under the Holy Roman Empire
- Jurij Rodionov (born 1999), Austrian tennis player
- Jurij Rovan (born 1975), Slovenian pole vaulter
- Jurij Tazel, politician in Slovenia during the early 16th century when it was under the Holy Roman Empire
- Jurij Tiffrer, 16th century politician in Slovenia when the country was under the Holy Roman Empire
- Jurij Vega (1754–1802), Slovene mathematician, physicist, artillery officer
- Jurij Viditsch, politician of the early 17th century in Slovenia when the country was under the Holy Roman Empire
- Jurij Wertatsch, politician of the mid 17th century in Slovenia, when the country was under the Holy Roman Empire

== Places ==
Slovenia

- Sveti Jurij, Rogašovci, village in the Municipality of Rogašovci (known as Jurij from 1955 to 1990)
- Sveti Jurij, Rogatec, settlement in the Municipality of Rogatec
- Sveti Jurij ob Ščavnici, town and a municipality
- Sveti Jurij v Slovenskih goricah, municipality
