= Mihael =

Mihael is a masculine given name with the same etymology as Michael, originating from the Hebrew phrase for "who is like God?". As of 2022, Mihael was Croatia's eleventh most popular name for baby boys.

Notable people with the name include:

- Mihael Ambrož (1808–1864), Slovenian politician
- Mihael Brejc (born 1947), Slovenian politician, Member of the European Parliament
- Mihael Frankovitsch, 16th century politician in Slovenia when the country was under the Holy Roman Empire
- Mihael Keehl, otherwise known as Mello, a character from the manga and anime series Death Note
- Mihael Kovačević (born 1988), Swiss footballer of Croatian descent
- Janez Mihael Kuk, 18th century politician in Slovenia when the country was under the Holy Roman Empire
- Mihael Mikić (born 1980), Croatian football player
- Mihael Milunović (born 1967), Serbian, French and Croatian painter
- Mihael Preiss, politician of the early 17th century in Slovenia when the country was under the Holy Roman Empire
- Mihael Rajić (born 1984), Croatian footballer
- Mihael Rosen, politician of the late 16th century in Slovenia when the country was under the Holy Roman Empire
- Mihael Stroj (1803–1871), Slovenian painter best known as Michael Stroy
- Mihael Vodapiuez, 16th century politician in Slovenia when the country was under the Holy Roman Empire
- Mihael Vončina (born 1969), Slovenian footballer
- Mihael Zmajlović (born 1978), Croatian economist and politician
- Mihael Žaper (born 1998), Croatian footballer

== See also ==
- Mihaela
- Mihail
