= Mirela Rusu =

Romanian aerobic gymnast

- Full name: Rusu Mirela Iuliana
- Born: 5 March 1978 (age 48) Bacău, Romania

Gymnastics career
- Discipline: Aerobic gymnastics
- Country represented: Romania (Romanian)
- Club: CSS 1 Farul Constanţa
- Head coach: Maria Fumea
- Assistant coach: Claudiu Varlam
- Retired: 2004
Medal record
Aerobic Gymnastics World Championships
Gold medal – first place	2004 Sofia	Groups
Gold medal – first place	2004 Sofia	Team
Gold medal – first place	2002 Klaipeda	Groups
Gold medal – first place	2002 Klaipeda	Team
Bronze medal – third place	2004 Sofia	Trio
Aerobic Gymnastics European Championships
Gold medal – first place	2003 Debrecen	Groups
Gold medal – first place	2001 Zaragoza	Groups
Gold medal – first place	1999 Birmingham	Groups
Silver medal – second place	2003 Debrecen	Trio
Silver medal – second place	2001 Zaragoza	Trio

Mirela Rusu (born 5 March 1978 in Bacău, Romania) is a retired Romanian aerobic gymnast. She won five world championship medals (four gold and one bronze) and five European championships medals (three gold and two silver).
