= Mihălășeni =

Mihălăşeni may refer to:

- Mihălășeni, Botoșani, a commune in Botoşani County, Romania
- Mihălăşeni, Ocniţa, a commune in Ocniţa district, Moldova

== See also ==
- Mihai (name)
- Mihalache (surname)
- Mihăești (disambiguation)
- Mihăiești (disambiguation)
- Mihăileni (disambiguation)
- Mihăilești
