= Cristina Marin =

Romanian aerobic gymnast

- Born: 10 December 1981 (age 44) Constanţa

Gymnastics career
- Discipline: Aerobic gymnastics
- Country represented: Romania
- Club: CSS 1 Farul Constanţa
- Head coach: Maria Fumea
- Assistant coach: Claudiu Varlam
Medal record
Aerobic Gymnastics World Championships
Gold medal – first place	2004 Sofia	Groups
Gold medal – first place	2002 Klaipeda	Groups
Bronze medal – third place	2004 Sofia	Trio
European Championships
Gold medal – first place	2005 Coimbra	Groups
Gold medal – first place	2003 Debrecen	Groups
Gold medal – first place	2001 Zaragoza	Groups
Gold medal – first place	1999 Birmingham	Groups
Silver medal – second place	2003 Debrecen	Trio
Silver medal – second place	2001 Zaragoza	Trio
Bronze medal – third place	2007 Szombathely	Groups

Cristina Marin (born 10 December 1981 in Constanţa, Romania) is a Romanian aerobic gymnast. She won three world championship medals (two gold and one bronze) and seven European championships medals (four gold, two silver and one bronze).
