= Mihalache (surname) =

Mihalache is Romanian surname, may refer to any of the following:

- Dan Mihalache, politician
- Ion Mihalache, politician
- Marius Mihalache, cimbalom player

== See also ==
- Mihai (name)
- Mihăilă
- Mihăești (disambiguation)
- Mihăiești (disambiguation)
- Mihăileni (disambiguation)
- Mihăilești
