= 1998 World Championships =

1998 World Championships may refer to:

- 1998 Aerobic Gymnastics World Championships
- 1998 ATP Tour World Championships
- 1998 BDO World Darts Championship
- 1998 FIBA World Championship for Women
- 1998 FIBA World Championship
- 1998 FIVB Men's World Championship
- 1998 FIVB Women's World Championship
- 1998 Ford World Women's Curling Championship
- 1998 IAAF World Cross Country Championships
- 1998 IBF World Junior Championships
- 1998 IAAF World Half Marathon Championships
- 1998 ICF Canoe Sprint World Championships
- 1998 IIHF World Championship
- 1998 Individual Speedway Junior World Championship
- 1998 ISF Women's World Championship
- 1998 Men's World Floorball Championships
- 1998 Men's World Ice Hockey Championships
- 1998 PDC World Darts Championship
- 1998 Superbike World Championship
- 1998 Trampoline World Championships
- 1998 UCI Cyclo-cross World Championships
- 1998 UCI Road World Championships
- 1998 UCI Track Cycling World Championships
- 1998 World Aquatics Championships
- 1998 World Fencing Championships
- 1998 World Figure Skating Championships
- 1998 World Ice Hockey Championships (disambiguation)
- 1998 World Junior Figure Skating Championships
- 1998 World Junior Ice Hockey Championships
- 1998 World Lacrosse Championship
- 1998 World Rhythmic Gymnastics Championships
- 1998 World Rowing Championships
- 1998 World Series
- 1998 World Snooker Championship
- 1998 World Weightlifting Championships
- 1998 World Wrestling Championships
- 1998 World Weightlifting Championships
- Biathlon World Championships 1998
- FIBT World Championships 1998
- FIDE World Chess Championship 1998
- FIL World Luge Natural Track Championships 1998
- FIS Ski-Flying World Championships 1998
- Paralympics: 1998 IPC Athletics World Championships
