= Dorel Moiș =

Romanian aerobic gymnast

- Full name: Gheorghe Dorel Moiș
- Born: 1 July 1975 (age 51) Satu Mare

Gymnastics career
- Discipline: Aerobic gymnastics
- Country represented: Romania
- Club: CSS 1 Farul Constanta
- Head coach: Maria Fumea
- Assistant coach: Claudiu Varlam
Medal record
Aerobic Gymnastics World Championships
Gold medal – first place	2000 Riesa	Trio
Silver medal – second place	1998 Catania	Trio
Bronze medal – third place	1999 Hannover	Trio
Aerobic Gymnastics European Championships
Gold medal – first place	1999 Birmingham	Trio

Dorel Moiș (born 1 July 1975 in Satu Mare, Romania) is a retired Romanian aerobic gymnast. He won three world championship medals (one gold, one silver and one bronze) and one gold European championships medal on the trio event. After retiring from aerobic gymnastics he founded a dance group called Xtreme.
