= Aurelia Ciurea =

Romanian aerobic gymnast

- Born: 17 March 1982 (age 44) Constanţa

Gymnastics career
- Discipline: Aerobic gymnastics
- Country represented: Romania
- Club: Farul Constana
Medal record
Aerobic Gymnastics World Championships
Gold medal – first place	2004 Sofia	Groups
Gold medal – first place	2002 Klaipeda	Groups
Silver medal – second place	2004 Sofia	Trio
Gold medal – first place	2004 Sofia	Team
Gold medal – first place	2002 Klaipeda	Team
Aerobic Gymnastics European Championships
Gold medal – first place	2003 Debrecen	Groups
Gold medal – first place	2001 Zaragoza	Groups
Aerobic Gymnastics World Cup
Bronze medal – third place	2003 S. Petersburg	Trio
Gold medal – first place	2003 Leipzig	Trio
Gold medal – first place	2004 Montlucon	Trio
Gold medal – first place	2003 Leipzig	Group
Gold medal – first place	2004 Montlucon	Group
Aerobic Gymnastics Balcanic Championships
Bronze medal – third place	2002 Constanta	Individual Women

Aurelia Ciurea (born 17 March 1982) is a Romanian aerobic gymnast.

Aurelia Ciurea started artistic gymnastics at the age of 4 in her hometown Constanta. She was part of the junior team, was competing for CSS 1 Farul Constanta and won many national titles in artistic gymnastics. She was part of the winning (team) title in the National Championship of Masters in 1994 and 1997, side by side with Simona Amanar. The last competition she participated in was the National Championship where she won 5 medals (2 gold: all-around, floor; 2 silver: beam and parallel bars; bronze in vault). Despite the fact that she was a very talented gymnast, she didn't made it to the 1996 Olympic team because at that time she was too young. She was considered for the 2000 Olympics, but she retired from gymnastics in 1998.

After her retirement from women's artistic gymnastics (WAG), Aurelia started with fitness and aerobics. In fitness, she won 3rd place at the National Championships in 1998. Aerobic gymnastics was at that time a relatively new "young" sport. Her first appearance, after only 6 months of training, was at the National Championships, where she got the bronze medal in individual women.

At the age of 17, Aurelia had been into a car accident, with severe trauma and fractures. The doctors emphasized that sport is out of the picture. However, Aurelia couldn't accept that news, especially since at the time the accident happened, she was preparing for an important competition that could have decided a spot on the national team in aerobics. After the recovery period, she returned to the gym determined to start over. She felt in her everyday practice, the disbelieve of the people surrounding her (coach, club, colleagues). However, she could always count on the care and support of her mother. Together, they made a plan to reshape her figure and regain the strength and mobility. After she turned 18, she was called to the national team for a test period. Aurelia worked very hard and remain on the national team until after the World Championships in 2004 (3 medals: 2 gold, 1 silver).

Her accomplishments in aerobic gymnastics are 5 medals in World Championship (4 gold and 1 silver) and 2 gold medals in European Championships. In 2003, gold in World Cup Series (Leipzig and Montlucon) and bronze at the World Cup Finals (Sank Petersburg). .
