= Capitani =

Surname list

Capitani is a surname. Notable people with the surname include:

- Alice Capitani (born 1984), Italian gymnast
- Giorgio Capitani (1927–2017), Italian film director and screenwriter
- Ignacio Capitani (born 1987), Argentine footballer
- Otello Capitani (1890–1912), Italian gymnast
- Remo Capitani (1927–2014), Italian actor

== See also ==
- Capitani (TV series)
