= Praunsperger =

Praunsperger is a surname. Notable people with the surname include:

- Lenart Praunsperger, 16th-century Slovenian politician
- Wilhelm Praunsperger (1497–1589), Slovenian politician
