= 1999 Aerobic Gymnastics World Championships =

- Location: Hanover, Germany
- Start date: 4 June 1999
- End date: 6 June 1999

The 5th Aerobic Gymnastics World Championships were held in Hannover, Germany from 4 to 6 June 1999.

Four events were contested: men's individual, women's individual, mixed pairs, and trios. Competitors from four countries won the four events. Park Kwang-Soo, the 1997 men's champion, regained his title in the men's individual event, while Yuriko Ito won a second consecutive women's title, and Vladislav Oskner and Tatiana Soloviova won their second consecutive mixed pairs title.

== Results ==
=== Women's Individual ===
| Rank | Gymnast | Country | Point |
|---|---|---|---|
| Gold medal | Yuriko Ito | Japan | 15.80 |
| Silver medal | Izabela Lăcătuș | Romania | 15.30 |
| Bronze medal | Patsy Tierney | Australia | 14.70 |
| 4 | Giovanna Lecis | Italy | 14.50 |
| 5 | Isamara Secati | Brazil | 14.40 |
| 6 | Christelle Soulie | France | 14.35 |
| 7 | Larisa Guseva | Russia | 13.35 |
| 8 | Jeanie Cloutier | Canada | 13.35 |

=== Men's Individual ===
| Rank | Gymnast | Country | Point |
|---|---|---|---|
| Gold medal | Kwang-Soo Park | South Korea | 17.75 |
| Silver medal | Olivier Florid | France | 17.65 |
| Bronze medal | Halldör Birgir Johannsson | Iceland | 16.75 |
| 4 | Anthony Ikin | Australia | 16.50 |
| 5 | Ken Ichiro Nomura | Japan | 16.35 |
| 6 | Claudio Franzen | Brazil | 15.15 |
| 7 | Octavio Garcia | Spain | 14.80 |
| 8 | Marian Gueourguiev Kolev | Bulgaria | 14.15 |
| 9 | A. Medeiros da Silva | Germany | 13.55 |

=== Mixed Pair ===
| Rank | Gymnasts | Country | Point |
|---|---|---|---|
| Gold medal | Tatiana Soloviova, Vladislav Oskner | Russia | 16.80 |
| Silver medal | In-Young Choi, Jae-Young Song | South Korea | 15.65 |
| Bronze medal | Rachel Muller, Stephan Brecard | France | 15.40 |
| 4 | Lacramioara Filip, Claudiu Moldovan | Romania | 15.35 |
| 5 | Fernanda Coleone Sasaki, Arley Marques | Brazil | 14.10 |
| 6 | Leinin Eva Rojas Munoz, Gian C. de Marco Camillo | Venezuela | 14.05 |
| 7 | Tanya Bojidarova Hadjieva, Nicolay Alexander Pipkov | Bulgaria | 13.40 |
| 8 | Lorena Veronica Luisio, Jorge Alfredo Fillon | Argentina | 12.30 |
| 9 | Beatrice Seidle, Thomas Uttendorfer | Germany | 11.75 |

=== Trio ===
| Rank | Gymnasts | Country | Point |
|---|---|---|---|
| Gold medal | Rodrigo Martins, Ibsen Nogueira, Admilson Vitório | Brazil | 16.25 |
| Silver medal | Grégory Alcan, Xavier Julien, Oliver Salvan | France | 16.25 |
| Bronze medal | Claudiu Moldovan, Remus Nicolai, Dorel Moiș | Romania | 15.70 |
| 4 | Attila Katus, Tamas Katus, Romeo Szentgyorgy | Hungary | 15.65 |
| 5 | Kyung-Shik Chang, Bon-Hyoun Koo, Choong-Han Lee | South Korea | 15.30 |
| 6 | Krassimira R. Dotzeva, Ludmila A. Kovatcheva, Galina Lazarova | Bulgaria | 14.747 |
| 7 | Mikhail Afus, Damir Gainoulline, Vassili Kozyrev | Russia | 13.80 |
| 8 | Maria Holmgren, Helene Nilsson, Kim Wickman | Sweden | 13.329 |
| 9 | Marie-Catherine Boesa, Janka Daubner, Sandra Schlueter | Germany | 13.323 |

=== Medal table ===
| Rank | Nation | Gold | Silver | Bronze | Total |
|---|---|---|---|---|---|
| 1 | South Korea | 1 | 1 | 0 | 2 |
| 2 | Brazil | 1 | 0 | 0 | 1 |
| 2 | Japan | 1 | 0 | 0 | 1 |
| 2 | Russia | 1 | 0 | 0 | 1 |
| 5 | France | 0 | 1 | 2 | 3 |
| 6 | Romania | 0 | 1 | 1 | 2 |
| 7 | Australia | 0 | 0 | 1 | 1 |
| 7 | Iceland | 0 | 0 | 1 | 1 |

== Bibliography ==
- FIG official site
- UEG European Union of Gymnastics Statistics
