= Vodapiuez =

Vodapiuez is a surname. Notable people with the surname include:

- Janez Vodapiuez (died 1608), Slovenian politician
- Mihael Vodapiuez, 16th-century Slovenian politician
