= Mihaela =

- Pronunciation: Mee-high-EH-la
- Gender: Female
- Language: Romanian, Croatian, Bulgarian
- Name day: 8th November

Mihaela is a female given name with the same etymology as Michaela. It is very common in Romania, and also found in Croatia, Slovenia and Bulgaria.

Notable people with the name include:

- Mihaela Adelgundis Černic (1913–2016), a Slovenian painter
- Mihaela Bene (born 1973), Romanian sprint canoer
- Mihaela Botezan (born 1976), Romanian long-distance runner
- Mihaela Buzărnescu (born 1988), Romanian tennis player
- Mihaela Chiras (born 1984), Romanian luger
- Mihaela Ciobanu (born 1973), Romanian-born Spanish handball goalkeeper
- Mihaela Dascălu (born 1970), retired Romanian speed skater
- Mihaela Horvat (born 1994), Croatian football player
- Mihaela Lazić (born 2000), Croatian basketball player
- Mihaela Loghin (born 1952), retired shot putter
- Mihaela Melinte (born 1975), Romanian hammer thrower
- Mihaela Miroiu (born 1955), Romanian political theorist and feminist philosopher
- Mihaela Mitrache or Mitraki (1955–2008), Romanian actress
- Mihaela Peneş (born 1947), retired Romanian track and field athlete
- Mihaela Pohoață (born 1981), Romanian aerobic gymnast
- Mihaela Runceanu (1955–1989), Romanian pop singer and vocal techniques teacher
- Mihaela Ani Senocico (born 1981), Romanian handball player
- Mihaela Stănuleţ (born 1966), Romanian artistic gymnast
- Mihaela Tivadar (born 1982), Romanian handball player
- Mihaela Cambei (born 2002), Romanian weightlifter

== See also ==
- Mihael
- Mihail
