= Curtoni =

Curtoni is a surname. Notable people with the surname include:

- Elena Curtoni (born 1991), Italian alpine ski racer
- Irene Curtoni (born 1985), Italian alpine ski racer
- Jakob De Curtoni, 16th century Slovenian politician
- Vittorio Curtoni (1949–2011), Italian science fiction writer
