= Pregelj =

Pregelj is a surname of Slovene origin. Notable people with the surname include:

- Ivan Pregelj (1883–1960), Slovene writer, playwright, poet, and critic
- Jade Pregelj (born 1991), Australian rules footballer
- Marij Pregelj (1913–1967), Slovene painter
- Martin Pregelj (born 1977), Slovene football manager and former player
- Sebastijan Pregelj (born 1970), Slovene writer

== See also ==
- Pregl
