= Mihai =

Given name and surname list

Mihai (Romanian pronunciation: [miˈhaj]) is a Romanian given name for males or a surname. It is equivalent to the English name Michael. A variant of the name is Mihail. Its female form is Mihaela. Notable people with these names include:

== Given name ==
- Mihai Timofti (1948–2023), Moldovan theatre and film director, actor, multi-instrumentalist musician, professor, screenwriter, writer, and composer
- Mihai I of Romania (1921–2017), King of Romania until 1947
- Mihai Antonescu (1904–1946), Romanian politician
- Mihai Balan (born 1954), Moldavian diplomat; father of Dan Balan
- Mihai Beniuc (1907–1988), Romanian poet
- Mihail G. Boiagi (1780–1828 or 1842/1843), Aromanian grammarian and professor
- Mihai Brediceanu (1920–2005), Romanian composer, conductor, and musicologist
- Mihail Celarianu (1893–1985), Romanian poet and novelist
- Mihai Ciucă (1883–1969), Romanian bacteriologist and parasitologist
- Mihai Constantinescu (born 1932), Romanian film director
- Mihail Cruceanu (1887–1988), Romanian poet
- Mihail Davidoglu (1910–1987), Romanian playwright
- Mihail Dimonie (1870–1935), Aromanian botanist and teacher
- Mihai Eminescu (1850–1889), Romanian poet
- Mihail Etropolski (born 1984), American fencer
- Mihail Gherasimencov (born 2005), Moldovan footballer
- Mihai Ghigiu (born 1989), Romanian politician
- Mihail Kogălniceanu (1817–1891), Romanian statesman, lawyer, historian, and publicist
- Mihail Lascăr (1889–1959), Romanian WWII general
- Mihai Leu (born 1969), Romanian boxer
- Mihai Magdei (born 1945), Moldovan Minister of Health
- Mihail Manoilescu (1891–1950), Romanian journalist, engineer, economist, politician, and memoirist
- Mihail Moxa (after 1550–before 1650), Wallachian historiographer
- Mihai Nadin (born 1938), Romanian scholar and researcher
- Mihai Nechita (born 1949), Romanian painter
- Mihai Paul (born 1982), Romanian basketball player
- Mihai Pelin (1940–2007), Romanian historian
- Mihail Sadoveanu (1880–1961), Romanian novelist
- Mihail Sebastian (1907–1945), Romanian playwright
- Mihail Șerban (disambiguation), several people
- Mihai Silvășan (born 1985), Romanian basketball coach
- Mihail Sturdza (1794–1884), Prince of Romania (1834–1849)
- Mihai Șubă (1947–2025), Romanian and Spanish chess grandmaster
- Mihai Trăistariu (born 1976), Romanian singer
- Mihai Răzvan Ungureanu (born 1968), Romanian historian and former Prime Minister
- Mihai Viteazul (1558–1601), Michael the Brave, ruler of Transylvania

== Surname ==
- Angela Mihai, Romanian-British applied mathematician
- Constantin Mihail
- Florența Mihai
- Gheorghe Mihail
- Liviu Mihai

== See also ==
- Mihailo
- Mihael
- Mihalache (surname)
- Mihăești (disambiguation)
- Mihăiești (disambiguation)
- Mihăileni (disambiguation)
- Mihăilești
- Mihălășeni (disambiguation)
- Mihăileasa River
- Mihăileasca River
