= Daniela Mărănducă =

Romanian gymnast (born 1976)

- Full name: Daniela Mărănducă
- Born: 17 June 1976 (age 50) Constanţa

Gymnastics career
- Discipline: Women's artistic gymnastics, Aerobic gymnastics
- Country represented: Romania
- Club: Farul Constanţa
- Head coaches: Octavian Belu, Maria Fumea
- Assistant coach: Mariana Bitang
Medal record
World Artistic Gymnastics Championships
Gold medal – first place	1994 Dortmund	Team
Aerobic Gymnastics World Championships
Gold medal – first place	2004 Sofia	Group
Gold medal – first place	2002 Klaipeda	Group
Bronze medal – third place	2004 Sofia	Trio
Aerobic Gymnastics European Championships
Gold medal – first place	2003 Debrecen	Group
Gold medal – first place	2001 Zaragoza	Group
Gold medal – first place	1999 Birmingham	Group
Silver medal – second place	2003 Debrecen	Trio
Silver medal – second place	2001 Zaragoza	Trio

Daniela Mărănducă Nicolai (born 17 June 1976 in Constanţa, Romania) is a retired artistic and aerobic gymnast. During her career she won nine medals at the World and European championships (six gold, two silver and one bronze). She is currently a coach of the Romanian junior national artistic gymnastics team.

== Artistic gymnastics career ==
Mărănducă started gymnastics at the age of 6 at Farul Constanța Club. In 1991 she became the first gymnast from that club to be selected to the national team. At the beginning of her senior career she was not selected to participate at major international competitions. Instead she competed at the Romanian Internationals and Romanian Nationals. In 1993 she finished third all around at the Romanian Internationals behind Lavinia Miloșovici and Ludmila Stovbchataya.

Soon after this competition she broke her ankle and severely sprained her wrist during practice. She was told that she would not be able to return to gymnastics but after recovering from her injuries she went back to Constanţa to train with the junior team. She made it back in the national team in 1994. Her determination to return to the national team was a great inspiration to the juniors training at Farul. Among these juniors was Simona Amânar who declared that seeing Mărănducă train and returning to the national team was "the best lesson [I] had ever learned".

1994 was a good year for Mărănducă. She won several medals at some minor competitions and went with the team in Dormunt to compete in the 1994 World Championships. Her performance on all four events, highlighted by a 9.8 on vault and a 9.837 on floor, helped the team to win the gold medal. She was also voted the most beautiful gymnast by the journalists covering the championships.

Mărănducă retired from artistic gymnastics at the end of 1994 and went back to Constanţa where she majored in Environmental studies and helped with coaching at Farul.

== Post 1994 and aerobic gymnastics career ==
After retiring from artistic gymnastics Mărănducă went to perform in the Aeros entertainment show. Among her colleagues at Aeros were Izabela Lăcătuș, Lăcrămioara Filip, Cristian Leric and Remus Nicolai. In 1996 she started to train for aerobic gymnastics and in 1999 she was selected to be a member of the national aerobic team trained by Maria Fumea. During her aerobic gymnastics career she won two world titles (2002 and 2004) and three continental titles (1999, 2001 and 2003) for the group event. She also won a world championships bronze medal and two European championships silver medals (2001 and 2003) and placed fifth at the 2002 world championships on the trio event. Mărănducă retired from aerobic gymnastics in 2005.

== Personal life ==
Mărănducă married her Aeros and national team colleague Remus Nicolai in 2002. Together they have a daughter, Valeria, who was born in 2006. In 2007 they opened a private gymnastics club in Constanţa. As of 2017 she trains, together with her husband, the junior artistic women's national team of Romania at the National Olympic Center in Deva.
