= 1998 Aerobic Gymnastics World Championships =

- Location: Catania, Italy
- Start date: 15 May 1998
- End date: 16 May 1998

The 4th Aerobic Gymnastics World Championships were held in Catania, Italy from 15 to 16 May 1998.

The event had the highest number of registered athletes since the first World championships in 1995. Four events were contested: men's individual, women's individual, mixed pairs, and trios. Competitors from four countries won the four events. The men's category was won by Jonathan Canada of Spain, who had competed only in mixed pairs for the previous three World Championships, which he won in 1996. He became the first aerobic gymnast to win gold in two disciplines at the World Championships. In the mixed pairs competition, Valdislav Oskner and Tatiana Soloviova won their first of four consecutive titles together. The Hungarian trio won Hungary's first title at the Championships.

== Results ==
=== Women's Individual ===
Rank	Gymnast	Country	Point
Gold medal	Yuriko Ito	Japan	17.25
Silver medal	Isamara Secati	Brazil	16.65
Bronze medal	Izabela Lăcătuș	Romania	16.60
4	Juanita Little	Australia	16.50
5	Chloé Maigre	France	16.05
6	Tammy Zoutendyk	South Africa	15.95
7	Kylie Carter	New Zealand	14.90
8	Orletta Tamantini	Italy	14.750
9	Janka Daubner	Germany	13.85

=== Men's Individual ===
Rank	Gymnast	Country	Point
Gold medal	Jonathan Canada	Spain	19.10
Silver medal	Kwang-Soo Park	South Korea	17.10
Bronze medal	Stanislav Marchenkov	Russia	16.95
4	Kaloyan Kaloyanov	Bulgaria	16.55
5	Claudiu Moldovan	Romania	16.20
6	Dean Wright	Australia	16.05
7	Olivier Florid	France	15.65
8	Nick Beyeler	Switzerland	14.90
9	Marco Bisciaio	Italy	13.80

=== Mixed Pair ===
Rank	Gymnasts	Country	Point
Gold medal	Tatiana Soloviova, Vladislav Oskner	Russia	17.75
Silver medal	Konstantza Popova, Kaloyan Kaloyanov	Bulgaria	17.60
Bronze medal	Izabela Lăcătuș, Claudiu Varlam	Romania	16.10
4	Reka Meszaros, Norbert Baucsek	Hungary	15.70
5	Sandra Arrigada, Jaime Salgado	Chile	15.35
6	Janka Daubner, Chris Harvey	Germany	15.20
7	Henrik Bramsved, Marika Gustafsson	Sweden	15.15
8	Erika Perugini, Daniele Pierantonio	Italy	13.65
9	Stephan Brecard, Rachel Muller	France	13.30

=== Trio ===
Rank	Gymnasts	Country	Point
Gold medal	Attila Katus, Tamas Katus, Romeo Szentgyorgyi	Hungary	16.55
Silver medal	Dorel Moiș, Claudiu Moldovan, Claudiu Varlam	Romania	16.25
Bronze medal	Maria Holmgren, Helene Nilsson, Kim Wickman	Sweden	15.87
4	Stanislav Marchenkov, Vadim Mikhailov, Denis Belikov	Russia	15.55
5	Grégory Alcan, Xavier Julien, Olivier Salvan	France	15.00
6	Won-Sil Choi, Hyun-Sung Ki, Kwang-Soo Park	South Korea	14.95
7	Marie-Catherine Boesa, Jana Heinze, Sandra Schlueter	Germany	14.835
8	Yumi Kobayashi, Kumi Sato, Hiroko Watabe	Japan	13.758
9	Giacomo Piccoli, Giovanna Lecis, Marco Bisciaio	Italy	13.044

=== Medal table ===
Rank	Nation	Gold	Silver	Bronze	Total
1	Russia	1	0	1	2
2	Hungary	1	0	0	1
2	Japan	1	0	0	1
2	Spain	1	0	0	1
5	Romania	0	1	2	3
6	Bulgaria	0	1	0	1
6	South Korea	0	1	0	1
6	Brazil	0	1	0	1
9	Sweden	0	0	1	1
