= 2002 Aerobic Gymnastics World Championships =

- Location: Klaipėda, Lithuania
- Start date: 29 July 2002
- End date: 31 July 2002

The 7th Aerobic Gymnastics World Championships were held in Žvejų rūmai hall, Klaipėda, Lithuania from 29 to 31 July 2002.

Five events were contested: men's individual, women's individual, mixed pairs, trios, and, for the first time, groups, which consisted of six gymnasts. A team event was also added for the first time, which used sums of scores from a country's entrants in each event. In the women's individual competition, Yuriko Ito won her third individual title.

== Results ==
=== Women's Individual ===
Rank	Gymnast	Country	Point
Gold medal	Yuriko Ito	Japan	18.450
Silver medal	Izabela Lăcătuș	Romania	17.950
Bronze medal	Mihaela Pohoata	Romania	17.450
4	Ekaterina Cherepanova	Russia	17.250
5	Ludmila Kovatcheva	Bulgaria	17.200
6	Giovanna Lecis	Italy	16.900
7	Monica Hontoria	Spain	16.250
8	Irene Gutierrez	Spain	15.650

=== Men's Individual ===
Rank	Gymnast	Country	Point
Gold medal	Jonatan Canada	Spain	19.680
Silver medal	Grégory Alcan	France	18.150
Bronze medal	S. Marchenkov	Russia	17.800
4	Halldor Birgir Johannsson	Iceland	17.700
5	Kwang-Soo Park	South Korea	17.200
6	Bogdan Popa	Romania	17.150
7	Leonardo Silva	Brazil	16.750
8	Diego Deville y Lozano	Argentina	15.530

=== Mixed Pair ===
Rank	Gymnasts	Country	Point
Gold medal	Tatiana Soloviova, Vladislav Oskner	Russia	18.700
Silver medal	Giovanna Lecis, Wilkie Satti Sanchez	Italy	18.350
Bronze medal	Izabela Lăcătuș, Remus Nicolai	Romania	17.850
4	Galina Lazarova, Marian Kolev	Bulgaria	17.450
5	Ekaterina Cherepanova, Sergei Konstantinov	Russia	17.100
6	Ana Macanita, Joan Barreira	Portugal	16.550
7	Irene Gutierrez, Israel Carrasco	Spain	16.400
8	Marina Matos Lopez, Lucas Barbugiani	Brazil	15.850

=== Trio ===
Rank	Gymnasts	Country	Point
Gold medal	Alba de las Heras, Jonatan Canada, Israel Carrasco	Spain	19.061
Silver medal	Assia Ramizova, Tanya Hadjieva, Margarita Stoyanova	Bulgaria	18.871
Bronze medal	C.E. Olivares Arancibia, Carolina Chacon Molinez, J.P. Olivares Arancibia	Chile	17.894
4	Anna Petrovicheva, Natalia Horgunova, Inna Soldatenko	Russia	16.829
5	Daniela Maranduca, Cristina Marin, Mirela Rusu	Romania	16.768
6	Cedric Rios, Harold Lorenzi, Gaylord Oubrier	France	16.500
7	Xialong Zang, Bo Song, Zhibin Ge	China	16.200
8	Diego Deville y Lozano, Fernando Javier Rolla, Luciano Miguel Jantus	Argentina	15.350

=== Group All-Around ===
Rank	Gymnast	Country	Point
Gold medal	Madalina Gogitu, Aurelia Ciurea, Cristina Marin, Daniela Nicolai, Mihaela Pohoata, Mirela Rusu	Romania	17.539
Silver medal	Marina Ulbina, Irina Ulbina, Ekaterina Cherepanova, Ekaterina Lunyushkina, Elena Kopylova, Danil Chermenev	Russia	16.347
Bronze medal	Mikhail Afus, Victor Sychov, Vasily Kozirev, Danila Chokhin, Inna Soldatenko, Anna Petrovicheva	Russia	16.000
4	Ki-Seong Kim, Kyung-Min Park, Jong-Kun Song, Yo-Han Nam, Tae-Ho Lee, Ji-Hwan Jang	South Korea	15.700
5	Sebastien Pommereau, Ludovic Robert, David Simeon, Harold Lorenzi, Pierrick Charilas, Gaylord Oubrier	France	15.400
6	Simone Mancini, Danila Mancini, Barbara Iannelli, Barbara Tomassetti, Ilaro Sergi, Sergio Belleantonio	Italy	15.083
7	Roberta Tecchi, Luna Pratesi, Lora Bertone, Alice Capitani, Serena Fabrizi, Mara Pistecchia	Italy	14.859
8	Violeta Monge, Esther Heredia, Noelia San Felipe, Lucia del Barco, Octavio Garcia, David Belio	Spain	14.432

=== Medal table ===
Rank	Nation	Gold	Silver	Bronze	Total
1	Spain	2	0	0	2
2	Russia	1	1	2	4
2	Romania	1	1	2	4
4	Japan	1	0	0	1
5	Bulgaria	0	1	0	1
5	France	0	1	0	1
5	Italy	0	1	0	1
8	Chile	0	0	1	1
