= Horacij Carminelli =

Horacij Carminelli was a politician of the early 17th century in Slovenia when the country was under the Holy Roman Empire. He became mayor of Ljubljana in 1629. He was succeeded by Andrej Stropel in 1631.
