= Mihaela Pohoață =

Romanian Gymnastic Federation- junior artistic gymnastics

Mihaela Pohoaţă
- Full name: Tania Mihaela Pohoaţă
- Nickname: Miky
- Born: 28 October 1981 (age 44) Fălticeni, Romania

Gymnastics career
- Discipline: AER /ART
- Country represented: Romania
- Former countries represented: Italy
- College team: Maria Olaru
- Club: College of Sport Cetate Deva - CSS 1 Farul Constanta
- Head coach: Maria Fumea
- Assistant coach: Claudiu Varlam
- Choreographer: Maria Fumea
Medal record
Aerobic Gymnastics World Championships
Gold medal – first place	2006 Nan Jing	Mixed Pair
Gold medal – first place	2004 Sofia	Groups
Gold medal – first place	2004 Sofia	Team.
Gold medal – first place	2002 Klaipeda	Groups.
Gold medal – first place	2002 Klaipeda	Team.
Bronze medal – third place	2004 Sofia	Individual
Bronze medal – third place	2002 Klaipeda	Individual
Aerobic Gymnastics European Championships
Gold medal – first place	2005 Coimbra	Mixed pair
Gold medal – first place	2003 Debrecen	Groups
Gold medal – first place	2001 Zaragoza	Groups

Mihaela Pohoaţă (born 28 October 1981 in Fălticeni, Romania) is a Romanian aerobic gymnast. During her career she won five world championships medals (three gold and two bronze) and three European championships gold medals. She is a two time world bronze medalist on the individual event.

2000-2005 she graduated the University of Education and Sports "Ovidius Costanta", with the specialization in Artistic Gymnastic. 2007-2009 she qualifies as an International coach of Aerobic Gymnastics with UEG. 10.05.2021 she completed her Master as a Pharmacy Assistant.
