= Andrej Falkh =

Slovenian politician

Andrej Falkh was a politician of the late 16th century in Slovenia when the country was under the Holy Roman Empire. He became mayor of Ljubljana in 1592. He was succeeded by Venturin Thrauison in 1593.
