= Pregl =

Pregl is a surname. Notable people with the name include:

- Fritz Pregl (1869–1930), Slovenian and Austrian chemist and physician
- Marko Pregl, 16th-century politician in Slovenia
- Slavko Pregl (born 1945), Slovenian writer, editor and publisher

== See also ==
- Fritz Pregl Prize, Austrian science and technology awards
- Pergl
