= Lăcrămioara Filip =

Romanian gymnast

Lăcrămioara (Filip) Moldovan
- Nickname: Lulu
- Born: 4 April 1973 (age 53) Moinești
- Height: 165 cm (5 ft 5 in)

Gymnastics career
- Discipline: Women's artistic gymnastics, Aerobic Gymnastics
- Country represented: Romania
- Club: Olimpic National Center Deva
- Head coaches: Adrian Goreac, Maria Fumea
- Assistant coaches: Maria Cosma, Adrian Stan, Octavian Bellu, Gabriel Popescu
- Former coaches: Dorina & Mihai Sandulescu
Medal record
World Artistic Gymnastics Championships
Silver medal – second place	1989 Stuttgart	Team
European Championships
Gold medal – first place	1999 Birmingham	Group

Lăcrămioara Filip (-Moldovan) (born 4 April 1973 Romania) is a retired Romanian artistic and aerobic gymnast. She is a world silver medalist with the team (artistic gymnastics) and a European gold medalist in the group event (aerobic gymnastics). Filip is also known to be the first gymnast to perform a tucked double front dismount from the uneven bars.

Currently, she is a gymnastics coach at the Romanian National Olympic Center in Deva, where she trains the national juniors team.

== Artistic gymnastics career ==
She started to train for artistic gymnastics at the National Olympic Center in Oneşti. Her debut at an international event was at the 1988 "Junior Friendship" meet (Druzhba), where she placed second with the team, fifth all-around and second on vault. In 1989, she was a member of the silver medaled team at the world championships. The other team members were Cristina Bontaș, Aurelia Dobre, Eugenia Popa, Gabriela Potorac, and Daniela Silivaş. Filip placed 5th in the vault and 28th in the 1990 Cottbus Cup and won bronze all around behind Lavinia Miloșovici and Maria Neculiţă at the 1991 Romanian International. She retired from artistic gymnastics after 1991.

== Aerobic gymnastics career ==
In the years after retirement, Lăcrămioara transferred to aerobic gymnastics. She trained at the C.S Farul Constanta club with coach Maria Fumea. In 1999, she won the gold medal for the group event at the European Championships, and together with her partner Claudiu Moldovan, she was placed 4th in the mixed pair event at the world championships. She also performed in the Aeros entertainment show. Her colleagues at Aeros were Daniela Mărănduca, Izabela Lăcătuș, Cristian Claudiu Moldovan, and Remus Nicolai.

== Post-retirement ==
Lăcrămioara married her aerobic gymnastics and Aeros colleague Cristian Claudiu Moldovan in 2001. Together, they have a daughter, Teodora Paula (born in 2004). In 2000, she became a gymnastics coach at Dinamo Club Bucharest. Currently, she is coaching with her husband at the Olympic Center Deva. Among many gymnasts, she coached young Diana Chelaru, Diana Bulimar, and Larisa Iordache.
