= 1995 Aerobic Gymnastics World Championships =

- Venue: Stade Pierre de Coubertin
- Location: Paris, France
- Start date: 16 December, 1995
- End date: 17 December, 1995
- Nations: 34

The 1st Aerobic Gymnastics World Championships were held in Paris, France on 16 and 17 December 1995. Held just a year after aerobic gymnastics came under the International Gymnastics Federation and a Code of Points was established, 34 countries sent competitors.

Four disciplines were contested: men's individual, women's individual, mixed pair, and trios. Brazil dominated the competition, winning three of the four gold medals.

== Results ==
=== Men's Individual ===
Rank	Gymnast	Country	Point
Gold medal	Mário Luis Américo	Brazil	33.800
Silver medal	Alain Courte	France	32.950
Bronze medal	Kwang-Soo Park	South Korea	31.900

=== Women's Individual ===
Rank	Gymnast	Country	Point
Gold medal	Carmen Valderas Munoz	Spain	34.650
Silver medal	Patsy Tierney	Australia	31.600
Bronze medal	Isamara Secati	Brazil	31.100

=== Mixed Pair ===
Rank	Gymnasts	Country	Point
Gold medal	Pedro Faccio, Erica Faccio	Brazil	35.100
Silver medal	Tatiana Soloviova, Vladislav Oskner	Russia	31.800
Bronze medal	Won-Sil Choi, Ye-Im Song	South Korea	31.550

=== Trio ===
Rank	Gymnasts	Country	Point
Gold medal	Ruy Faria Amadei, Gilberto Faria Lopes, Ary Marques	Brazil	33.650
Silver medal	Andrei Nezezon, Claudiu Catalin Varlam, Claudiu Cristian Moldovan	Romania	33.400
Bronze medal	Attila Katus, Tamas Katus, Romeo Szentgyorgyi	Hungary	33.300

=== Medal table ===
Rank	Nation	Gold	Silver	Bronze	Total
1	Brazil	3	0	1	4
2	Spain	1	0	0	1
3	Australia	0	1	0	1
3	France	0	1	0	1
3	Romania	0	1	0	1
3	Russia	0	1	0	1
7	South Korea	0	0	2	2
8	Hungary	0	0	1	1
