= Johannes Baptista Lanthieri =

Johannes Baptista Lanthieri, in Slovene known as Janez Lanth(i)eri, was an Italian merchant with hides. He arrived in the late 15th century from Bergamo and lived in Ljubljana, the capital of Carniola. In 1504, he was elected the first mayor of Ljubljana. He was succeeded by Gregor Lagner in 1505.
