= Remus Nicolai =

Romanian aerobic gymnast

- Full name: Remus Nicolai
- Born: 10 June 1977 (age 49) Bistriţa

Gymnastics career
- Discipline: Aerobic gymnastics
- Country represented: Romania
- Club: CSS 1 Farul Constanţa
- Gym: Kuhberg SSV 1844 Leistungsturnnen Mänlich
- Head coach: Maria Fumea
Medal record
Aerobic Gymnastics World Championships
Gold medal – first place	2000 Riesa	Trio
Silver medal – second place	2004 Sofia	Individual
Silver medal – second place	2000 Riesa	Mixed Pair
Bronze medal – third place	2004 Sofia	Mixed Pair
Bronze medal – third place	2002 Klaipeda	Mixed Pair
Bronze medal – third place	1999 Hannover	Trio
Aerobic Gymnastics European Championships
Gold medal – first place	2003 Debrecen	Mixed Pair
Gold medal – first place	1999 Birmingham	Trio
Silver medal – second place	2003 Debrecen	Individual
Silver medal – second place	2001 Zaragoza	Mixed Pair
Bronze medal – third place	1999 Birmingham	Mixed Pair

Remus Nicolai (born 10 June 1977 in Bistriţa, Romania) is a retired Romanian aerobic gymnast. He had a successful career winning six world championships medals (one gold, two silver and three bronze) and five European championships medals (two gold, two silver and one bronze). After retiring from aerobic gymnastics he opened together with his wife (Daniela Mărănducă) a private gymnastics club in Constanţa. As of 2013 he trains, together with his wife, the junior artistic women's National Team of Romania at the National Olympic Center in Onesti.
