= Janez Kristof Pucher pl. Puechenthall =

Janez Kristof Pucher pl. Puechenthall was a politician of the early 18th century in Slovenia, when the country was under the Holy Roman Empire. He became mayor of Ljubljana in 1710. He was succeeded by Anton Janeshitsh in 1712.
