= 2000 Aerobic Gymnastics World Championships =

- Venue: Sachsen Arena
- Location: Riesa, Germany
- Start date: 2 June 2000
- End date: 4 June 2000

The 6th Aerobic Gymnastics World Championships were held in Riesa, Germany from 2 to 4 June 2000.

Four events were contested: men's individual, women's individual, mixed pairs, and trios. Jonathon Canada, the 1998 men's individual winner, regained his title.

== Results ==
=== Women's Individual ===
Rank	Gymnast	Country	Point
Gold medal	Izabela Lăcătuș	Romania	19.05
Silver medal	Isamara Secati	Brazil	18.90
Bronze medal	Ludmila Kovatcheva	Bulgaria	18.65
4	Monica Hontoria	Spain	18.50
5	Sanda Arriagada	Chile	18.20
6	Yuriko Ito	Japan	17.75
7	Me-Hee Kang	South Korea	17.75
8	Giovanna Lecis	Italy	17.60
9	Janka Daubner	Germany	17.25

=== Men's Individual ===
Rank	Gymnast	Country	Point
Gold medal	Jonatan Canada	Spain	19.00
Silver medal	Kwang-Soo Park	South Korea	18.60
Bronze medal	Claudiu Moldovan	Romania	18.30
4	Stanislav Marchenkov	Russia	18.30
5	Grégory Alcan	France	18.25
6	Halldör Birgir Johannsson	Iceland	18.25
7	Stuart Fisher	Australia	17.30
8	Norbert Boros	Hungary	17.05
9	Julian Drescher	Germany	15.55

=== Mixed Pair ===
Rank	Gymnasts	Country	Point
Gold medal	Tatiana Soloviova, Vladislav Oskner	Russia	19.85
Silver medal	Izabela Lăcătuș, Remus Nicolai	Romania	19.15
Bronze medal	Young-Han Choi, In-Young Choi	South Korea	18.85
4	Galina Lazarova, Marian Kolev	Bulgaria	18.45
5	Stéphane Brecard, Rachel Muller	France	18.25
6	Sandra Arriagada, Jaime Salgado	Chile	17.90
7	Melisa Hermoso, Israel Carrasco	Spain	17.55
8	Marina Lopez, Arley Marques	Brazil	16.75
9	Anke Beranek, Klaus Haeberle	Germany	14.10

=== Trio ===
Rank	Gymnasts	Country	Point
Gold medal	Dorel Moiș, Claudiu Moldovan, Remus Nicolai	Romania	19.05
Silver medal	In-Young Choi, Young-Han Choi, Ki-Sung Kim	South Korea	18.366
Bronze medal	Vasily Cozirev, Victor Sichov, Sergei Ivanov	Russia	18.20
4	Rodrigo Martins, Ibsen Nogueira, Admilson Vitorio	Brazil	18.20
5	Ludmila Kovatcheva, Krassimira Dotzeva, Galina Lazarova	Bulgaria	18.105
6	Jaime Salgado, Jean Paul Olivares, Cristian Olivares	Chile	18.05
7	Olivier Salvan, Grégory Alcan, Xavier Julien	France	17.95
8	Luciano Jantus, Fernando Rolla, Fillon Jorge Alfredo	Argentina	17.55
9	Mandy Skroch, Jana Radtke, Danalia Schroeter	Germany	15.347

=== Medal table ===
Rank	Nation	Gold	Silver	Bronze	Total
1	Romania	2	1	1	4
2	Russia	1	0	1	2
3	Spain	1	0	0	1
4	South Korea	0	2	1	3
5	Brazil	0	1	0	1
6	Bulgaria	0	0	1	1
