= Johann Ludwig Schönleben =

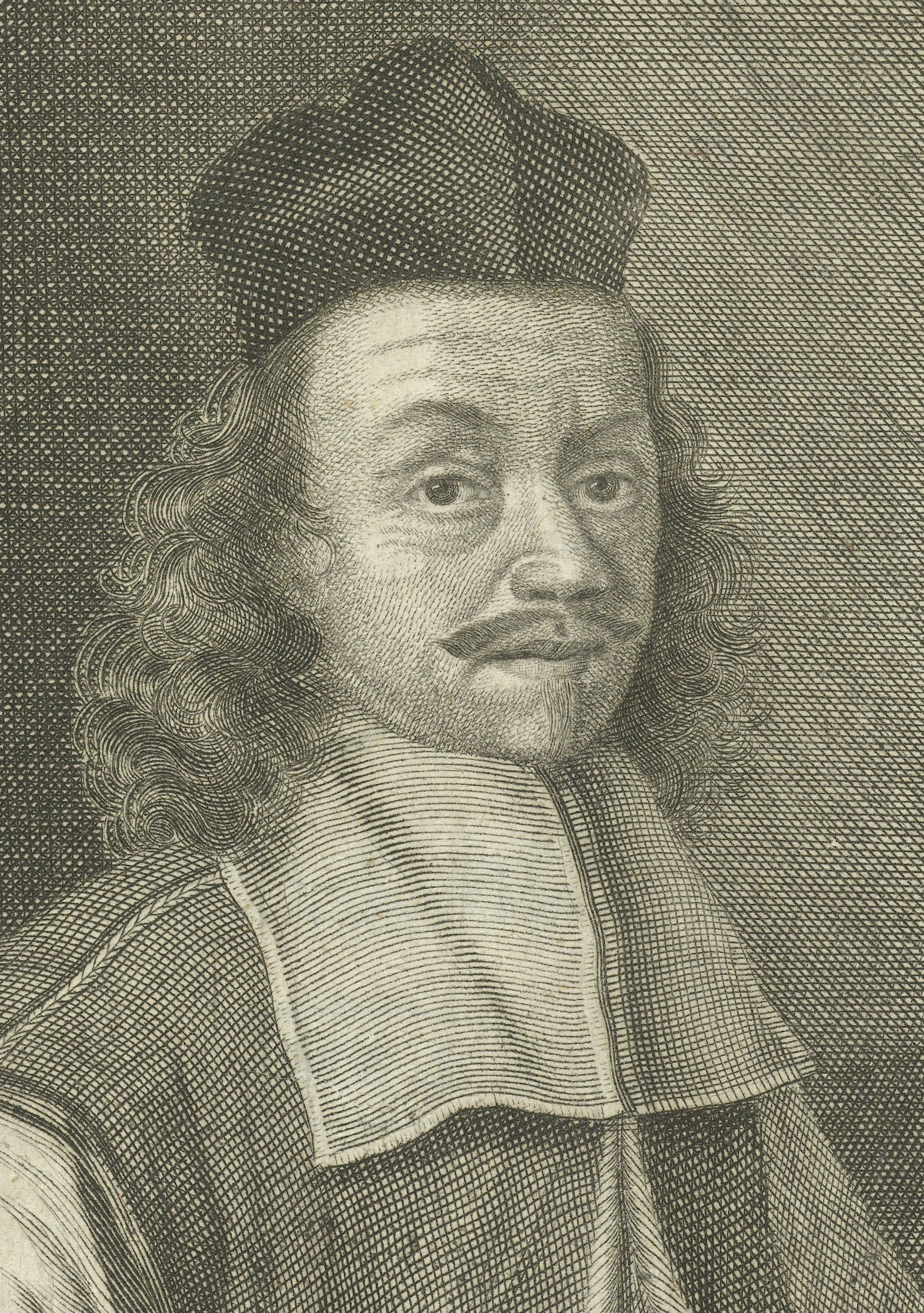
- Born: November 16, 1618; Laibach, Carniola, (now Ljubljana, Slovenia)
- Died: October 15, 1681 (aged 62); Laibach, Carniola, (now Ljubljana, Slovenia)
- Resting place: St. James's Parish Church (Ljubljana)
- Known for: Historian
- Parent(s): Ludwig Schönleben and Susanna Kuschlan

Johann Ludwig Schönleben (November 16, 1618 – October 15, 1681; Slovenized: Janez Ludvik, Latin: Joannis Ludovici) was a Carniolan priest, rhetorician, and historian.

== Life and work ==
Schönleben was born in Ljubljana, the son of the politician Ludwig Schönleben and his wife Susanna Kuschlan and baptized Joan. Ludovicus Shönliebel. The family originally stemmed from Württemberg. He attended the Jesuit college in Ljubljana and joined the order on October 15, 1635. Schönleben studied in Vienna, Graz, and Passau. He left the Jesuit order in 1653, received a doctorate in Padua, and then returned to Ljubljana.

Schönleben was a well-known rhetorician and some of his speeches were also published. He was important in theology as a proponent of the Immaculate Conception. As a historian, he wrote a series of genealogies of Carniolan noble families. His most important work was Carniolia antiqua et nova (Carniola Old and New; Ljubljana, 1681). He was the teacher of Johann Weikhard von Valvasor.

Schönleben died in Ljubljana and was buried in St. James's Church.
