= 2004 Aerobic Gymnastics World Championships =

- Location: Sofia, bulgaria
- Start date: 3 June 2004
- End date: 5 June 2004

The 8th Aerobic Gymnastics World Championships were held in Sofia, Bulgaria from 3 to 5 June 2004.

For the first time, a World Age Group (junior) competition was included. Angela McMillan became the first New Zealander to win a World title. Grégory Alcan, the previous year's silver medalist in the men's individual event, won the men's title.

== Results ==
=== Women's Individual ===
Rank	Gymnast	Country	Point
Gold medal	Angela McMillan	New Zealand	19.850
Silver medal	Giovanna Lecis	Italy	19.400
Bronze medal	Mihaela Pohoata	Romania	19.400
4	Ana Maçanita	Portugal	19.100
5	Izabela Lăcătuș	Romania	19.050
6	Ludmila Kovatcheva	Bulgaria	18.850
7	Elmira Dassaeva	Spain	18.600
8	Yuriko Ito	Japan	18.500

=== Men's Individual ===
Rank	Gymnast	Country	Point
Gold medal	Grégory Alcan	France	20.100
Silver medal	Remus Nicolai	Romania	19.550
Bronze medal	Sergei Konstantinov	Russia	19.400
4	Israel Carrasco	Spain	19.200
5	Alexander Golenko	Russia	18.800
6	Vito Iaia	Italy	18.450
7	Bo Song	China	18.400
8	Adrien Galo	France	18.00

=== Mixed Pair ===
Rank	Gymnasts	Country	Point
Gold medal	Galina Lazarova, Marian Kolev	Bulgaria	19.780
Silver medal	Alba de las Heras, Jonatan Canada	Spain	19.750
Bronze medal	Izabela Lăcătuș, Remus Nicolai	Romania	19.700
4	Giovanna Lecis, Wilkie Satti Sanchez	Italy	19.250
5	In Yung Choi, Jong Kun Song	South Korea	18.800
6	Elena Kopylova, Aleksander Shulga	Russia	18.530
7	Juliana Antero, Marcisnei Oliveira	Brazil	18.400
8	Carolina Chacon Molinez, J.P. Olivares Arancibia	Chile	18.050

=== Trio ===
Rank	Gymnasts	Country	Point
Gold medal	Marina Lopez, Marcela Lopez, Cibele Rosito Oliani	Brazil	20.624
Silver medal	Raluca Elena Babaligea, Madalina Cioveie, Aurelia Ciurea	Romania	20.400
Bronze medal	Cristina Marin, Daniela Nicolai, Mirela Rusu	Romania	19.641
4	Velislava Milanova, Assia Ramizova, Margarita Stoyanova	Bulgaria	19.532
5	Rosa Alvarez, Jonatan Canada, Israel Carrasco	Spain	19.217
6	Eugenia Anisimova, Maria Mamontova, Inna Soldantenko	Russia	18.844
7	Carolina Chacon Molinez, C. Olivarez Arancibia, J.-P. Olivarez Arancibia	Chile	18.717
8	Danica Aitken, Joanna Aitken, Kelly Aitken	New Zealand	18.703

=== Group ===
Rank	Gymnast	Country	Point
Gold medal	Madalina Cioveie, Aurelia Ciurea, Cristina Marin, Daniela Nicolai, Mihaela Pohoata, Mirela Rusu	Romania	20.382
Silver medal	Pavel Grishin, Alexander Golenko, Maria Mamontova, Natalia Morgunova, Danila Shohin, Inna Soldatenko	Russia	19.638
Bronze medal	Jinping Ao, Shijian He, Yong Qin, Hongbin Tang, Song Yan, Wei Yu	China	19.600
4	Xavier Alegret, Rosa Alverez, Jonatan Canada, Israel Carrasco, Marta Casulleras, Seray Martin	Spain	19.578
5	Hristian Busarov, Marian Kolev, Ludmila Kovatcheva, Galina Lazarova, Velislava Milanova, Margarita Stoyanova	Bulgaria	19.265
6	Anastasia Alexeeva, Eugenia Anisimova, Elena Kopilova, Anna Kovaleva, Elena Kurochkina, Natalia Volina	Russia	18.826
7	Grégory Alcan, Josian Bouille, Xavier Julien, Harold Lorenzi, Gaylord Oubrier, Nicolas Brunet	France	18.100
8	Vili Buhalova, Galina Ivanova, Iva Ivanova, Radostina Milenova, Ivelina Nikolova, Lina Topurkova	Bulgaria	17.826

=== Medal table ===
Rank	Nation	Gold	Silver	Bronze	Total
1	Romania	1	2	3	6
2	Bulgaria	1	0	0	1
2	France	1	0	0	1
2	Brazil	1	0	0	1
2	New Zealand	1	0	0	1
6	Russia	0	1	1	2
7	Italy	0	1	0	1
7	Spain	0	1	0	1
9	China	0	0	1	1
