= Andrei Nezezon =

Romanian aerobic gymnast

- Born: 1975 (age 50–51) Satu Mare, Romania

Gymnastics career
- Discipline: Aerobic gymnastics
- Country represented: Romania
- Club: CSU ANEFS Bucharest
- Head coach: Maria Fumea
Medal record
Aerobic Gymnastics World Championships
| Gold medal – first place | 1997 Perth | Trio |
| Gold medal – first place | 1996 La Haye | Trio |
| Silver medal – second place | 1995 Paris | Trio |
| Bronze medal – third place | 1997 Perth | Individual |

Andrei Nezezon (born 1975 in Satu Mare) is a retired Romanian aerobic gymnast. He had a successful career winning four world championships medals (two gold, one silver, and one bronze) After his retirement in 1997 he went to Germany where he works as a gymnastics coach at the TKH gymnastics club in Hanover.
