= Andrej Kroen =

Slovenian politician

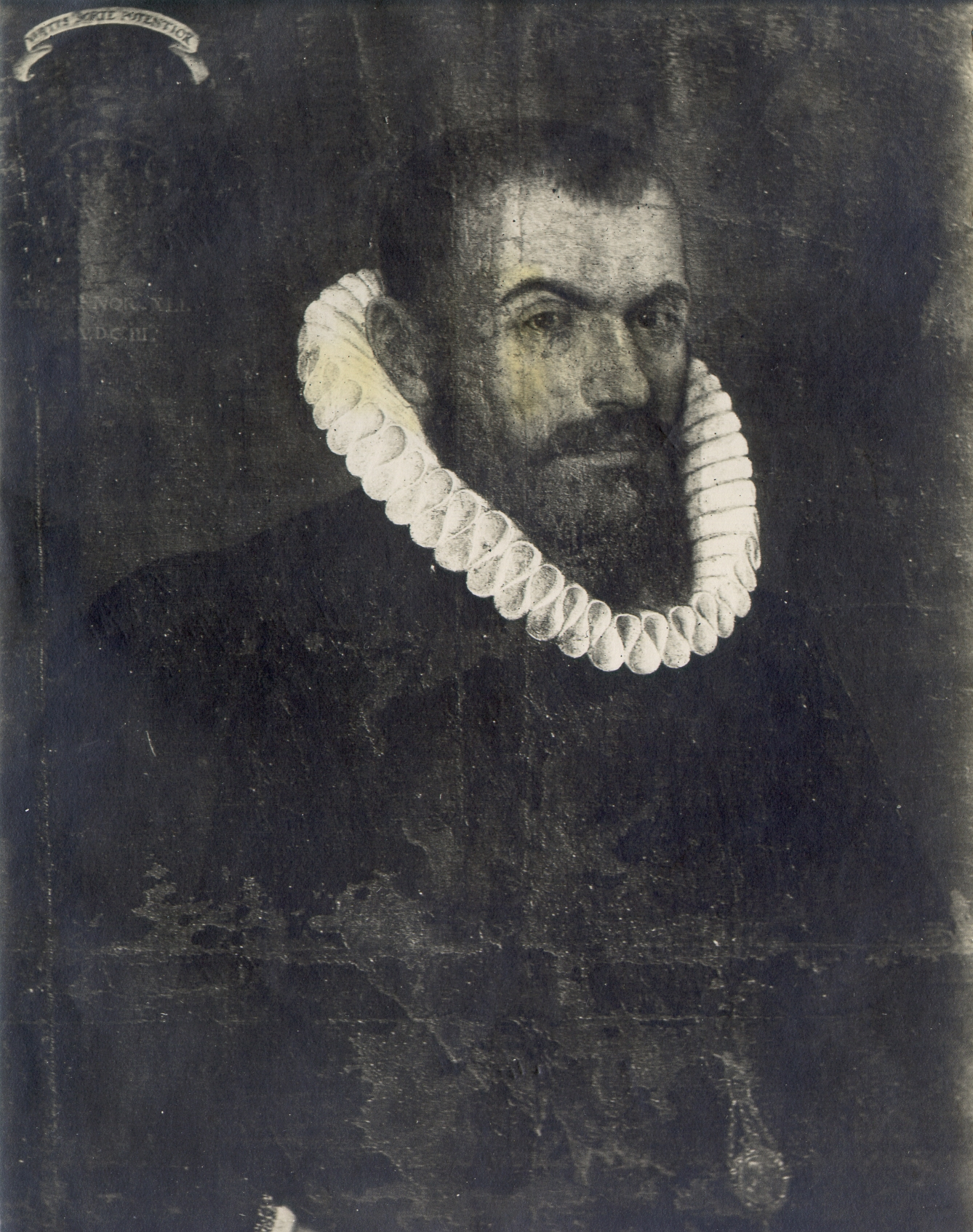
Andrej Kroen

Andrej Kroen was a politician of the late 16th century and early 17th century in Slovenia when the country was under the Holy Roman Empire. He became mayor of Ljubljana in 1599. He was succeeded by Josip Tschauller in 1600.
