= Volk Gebhardt =

Volk Gebhardt was a 16th-century politician in Slovenia when the country was under the Holy Roman Empire. He became mayor of Ljubljana in 1544. He was succeeded by Janez Dorn in 1548.
