= Kristof Otto =

Kristof Otto was a politician of the 17th century in Slovenia when the country was under the Holy Roman Empire. He became mayor of Ljubljana in 1634. He was succeeded by Gregor Khunstl in 1638.
