= Peter Reicher =

Peter Reicher was a politician in Slovenia during the first half of the 16th century when it was under the Holy Roman Empire. He became mayor of Ljubljana in 1529. He was succeeded by Krištof Stern in 1530.
