= Ary Marques =

Brazilian footballer and coach (born 1955)

Personal information
- Full name: Ary Rocha Marques
- Date of birth: 1 April 1955 (age 71)
- Place of birth: Piraju, Brazil
- Height: 1.70 m (5 ft 7 in)
- Position: Right-back

Team information
- Current team: Araucária (manager)

Youth career
- Dom Bosco
- Colorado

Senior career*
Years	Team	Apps	(Gls)
1975–1989	Colorado	500+	
1984	→ Marcílio Dias (loan)		

Managerial career
- 1990–1994: Paraná (youth)
- 1994–1995: Lebanon
- 1995–2005: Paraná (youth)
- 2008–2009: Urano
- 2010–2012: Cuiabá
- 2013: Cuiabá
- 2014: Mixto
- 2015–2016: J. Malucelli
- 2017: Rio Branco
- 2019–: Araucária
- * Club domestic league appearances and goals

Ary Rocha Marques (born 1 April 1955) is a Brazilian football coach and former player who is the manager of Araucária.

Marques began his career as a player in 1975 at Colorado Esporte Clube, playing as a right-back. He was loaned to Marcílio Dias in 1984, winning the Taça FCF, before retiring at Colorado in 1989 as the club's all-time record appearance holder, with over 500 appearances.

In 1989 Colorados merged with Pinheiros to form Paraná; Marques became the club's youth coach from 1990 to 2005, winning multiple titles. Between 1994 and 1995 Marques had a short experience as manager of the Lebanon national team. Between 2008 and 2009 Marques coached amateur side Urano, before joining Cuiabá in 2010, where he won the Copa Mato Grosso in 2010, and the Campeonato Mato-Grossense in 2013. In 2017 he was the head coach of Rio Branco in the Campeonato Paranaense for one month.

== Playing career ==
Born in Piraju, Brazil, on 1 April 1955, Marques began playing as a teenager at local club Don Bosco. While playing at the club, Marques was observed by Nenê, a professional player at Colorado Esporte Clube, who had been working in Piraju.

Playing as a right-back, Marques made his senior debut for Colorado on 17 August 1975, the last matchday of the Campeonato Paranaense, coming on as a substitute for right winger Wilton. In 1980 he won the Campeonato Paranaense with the club. In 1984 he was sent on loan to Santa Catarina-based club Marcílio Dias, and won the Taça FCF.

Marques played in the club's last ever game, on 9 July 1989, prior to their merger with Pinheiros to form Paraná. The match was a 3–3 away draw against Coritiba, in front of 2,184 fans. Following the dissolution of Colorado, Marques retired as the club's most-capped player in history, with over 500 games.

== Managerial career ==
Following Colorado's merger with Pinheiros in 1989, to form Paraná, Marques took charge of the newly-formed club's youth sector, from 1990 to 2005. As a youth coach, Marques won eight titles with Paraná. Between 1994 and 1995 Marques had a short stint as manager of the Lebanon national team.

In 2008 Marques became the head coach of amateur club Urano. He stayed two seasons at the club, winning two Título da Suburbana, and a Taça Paraná in 2009. In January 2010, Marques joined Cuiabá, winning the Copa Mato Grosso in his first year as the club's head coach, and the Campeonato Mato-Grossense in 2013, his last year of tenure.

On 14 February 2017, Marques was appointed head coach of Campeonato Paranaense side Rio Branco. However, after only one win in six games, Marques was fired on 24 March 2017.

== Personal life ==
In 1982 Marques married Vera, a student of Physical Education at the Federal University of Paraná, which Marques also attended. The couple have two children: Felipe, an engineer, and Letícia, a biologist.

== Honours ==
=== Player ===
Colorado

- Campeonato Paranaense: 1980

Marcílio Dias

- Taça FCF: 1984

Records

- Colorado Esporte Clube all-time appearance holder: 500+ appearances

=== Manager ===
Urano

- Título da Suburbana: 2008, 2009
- Taça Paraná: 2009

Cuiabá

- Campeonato Mato-Grossense: 2011, 2013
- Copa Mato Grosso: 2010
