= Anton Lantheri =

16th century Slovenian politician

Anton Lantheri was a politician in Slovenia during the early 16th century when it was under the Holy Roman Empire. He became mayor of Ljubljana in 1516. He was succeeded by Janez Standinath in 1518.
