= Florijan von Grafflieiden =

Florijan von Grafflieiden was a politician of the early 18th century in Slovenia, when the country was under the Holy Roman Empire. He became mayor of Ljubljana in 1720. He was succeeded by Matija Christian in 1726.
