= Anton Feichtinger =

Anton Feichtinger was a politician of the late 16th century in Slovenia when the country was under the Holy Roman Empire. He became mayor of Ljubljana in 1598. He was succeeded by Andrej Kroen in 1599.
