= Janez Graffenhueber =

Janez Graffenhueber was a politician of the late 17th century and early 18th century in Slovenia, when the country was under the Holy Roman Empire. He became mayor of Ljubljana in 1699. He was succeeded by Gabriel Eder in 1702.
