= Gaspar Hoffstetter =

Mayor of Ljubljana, 1574–1582

Gaspar Hoffstetter was a 16th-century politician in Slovenia when the country was under the Holy Roman Empire. He became mayor of Ljubljana in 1574 and in serving a period of eight years became one of the longest serving mayors of the city. It is hard to tell whether he was popular or not, as with the then common lack of records. He was succeeded by Marko Stetner in 1582.
