= Mihăilă =

Mihăilă is a Romanian surname. Notable people with the surname include:

- Ioana Mihăilă (born 1980), Romanian politician and endocrinologist
- Narcis Mihăilă (born 1987), Romanian racewalker
- Valentin Mihăilă (born 2000), Romanian footballer
