= Wilhelm Praunsperger =

Wilhelm Praunsperger von Weichslbach zum Pannouitsch (Slovenianized: Viljem Praunsperger, 1497–1589) was a politician in Slovenia during the first half of the 16th century, when it was under the Holy Roman Empire. He became mayor of Ljubljana in 1531–1532, 1535, and 1538. He was succeeded by Veit Khisl in 1533, and by Hanns Weilhammer in 1536 and 1539.
