= Mihael Ambrož =

Slovenian politician

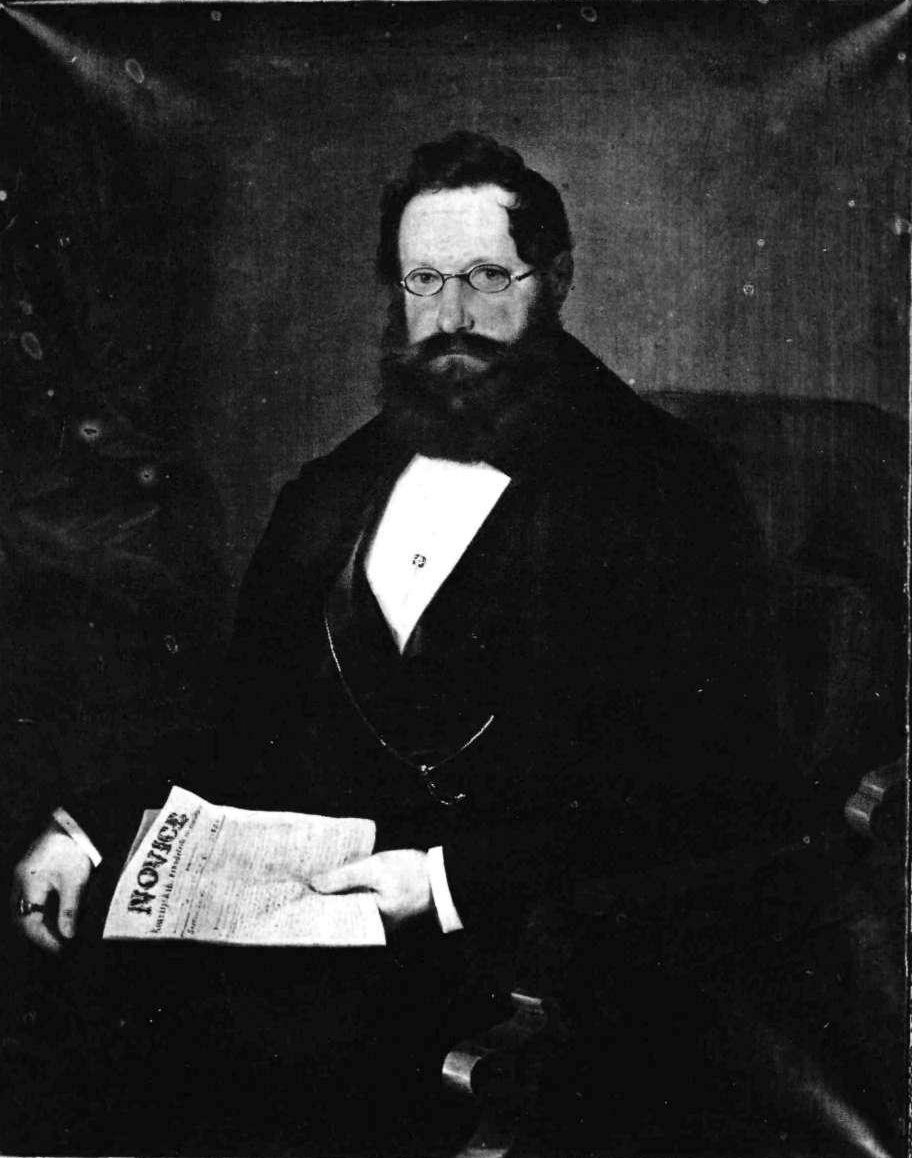
- Born: February 14, 1808; Ljubljana
- Died: April 25, 1864 (aged 56)

Mihael Ambrož (February 14, 1808 – April 25, 1864) was a politician from the Austrian Empire. He was mayor of Ljubljana from 1861 to 1864.
