= Jakob Herendler =

Jakob Herendler was a politician of the early 18th century in Slovenia, when the country was under the Holy Roman Empire. He became mayor of Ljubljana in 1716. He was succeeded by Florijan von Grafflieiden in 1720.
