= Matija Christian =

Matija Christian was a politician of the early 18th century in Slovenia, when the country was under the Holy Roman Empire. He became mayor of Ljubljana in 1726 and was one of the longest serving mayors in the history of the city with term of 12 years. He was succeeded by Anton Raab in 1738.
