= Marko Wiz =

Marko Wiz was a politician of the 17th century in Slovenia when the country was under the Holy Roman Empire. He became mayor of Ljubljana in 1640. He was succeeded by Fran Cirian in 1647.
