= 1998 World Ice Hockey Championships =

1998 World Ice Hockey Championships may refer to:

- 1998 Men's World Ice Hockey Championships
- 1998 World Junior Ice Hockey Championships
