= Adam Eggich =

17th-century politician in Slovenia

Adam Eggich was a politician of the early 17th century in Slovenia when the country was under the Holy Roman Empire. He became mayor of Ljubljana in 1616. He was succeeded by Adam Weiss in 1619.
