= Josip Tschauller =

Josip Tschauller was a politician of the late 16th century and early 17th century in Slovenia when the country was under the Holy Roman Empire. He became mayor of Ljubljana in 1600. He was succeeded by Andrej Sallitinger in 1601.
