= Janez Maria Pisckhon =

Janez Maria Pisckhon was a politician of the 17th century in Slovenia, when the country was under the Holy Roman Empire. He became mayor of Ljubljana in 1663 and served for nine years, making him one of the longest serving in the city's history. He was succeeded by Janez Krstnik Dolnitscher in 1672.
