= Janez Jernej Bosio =

Janez Jernej Bosio was a politician of the 17th century in Slovenia, when the country was under the Holy Roman Empire. He became mayor of Ljubljana in 1679 and served for a period of nine years, making him one of the longest serving mayors of the city. He was succeeded by Gabriel Eder in 1688.
