= Janez Phanner =

Janez Phanner was a 16th-century politician in Slovenia when the country was under the Holy Roman Empire. He became mayor of Ljubljana in 1571. He was succeeded by Gaspar Hoffstetter in 1574.
