= Janez Nepomuk Mikolitsch =

Janez Nepomuk Mikolitsch was a politician of the 18th century in Slovenia, when the country was under the rule of the Holy Roman Empire. He became mayor of Ljubljana in 1774. He was succeeded by Anton Fran Wagner in 1775.
