= Venturin Thrauison =

Slovenian politician

Venturin Thrauison was a politician of the late 16th century in Slovenia when the country was under the Holy Roman Empire. He became mayor of Ljubljana in 1593. He was succeeded by Mihael Rosen in 1595.
