= Janez Krstnik Gedenelli =

Janez Krstnik Gedenelli was a politician of the early 17th century in Slovenia when the country was under the Holy Roman Empire. He became mayor of Ljubljana in 1610. He was succeeded by Adam Eggich in 1616.
