= Josip Pototschnig =

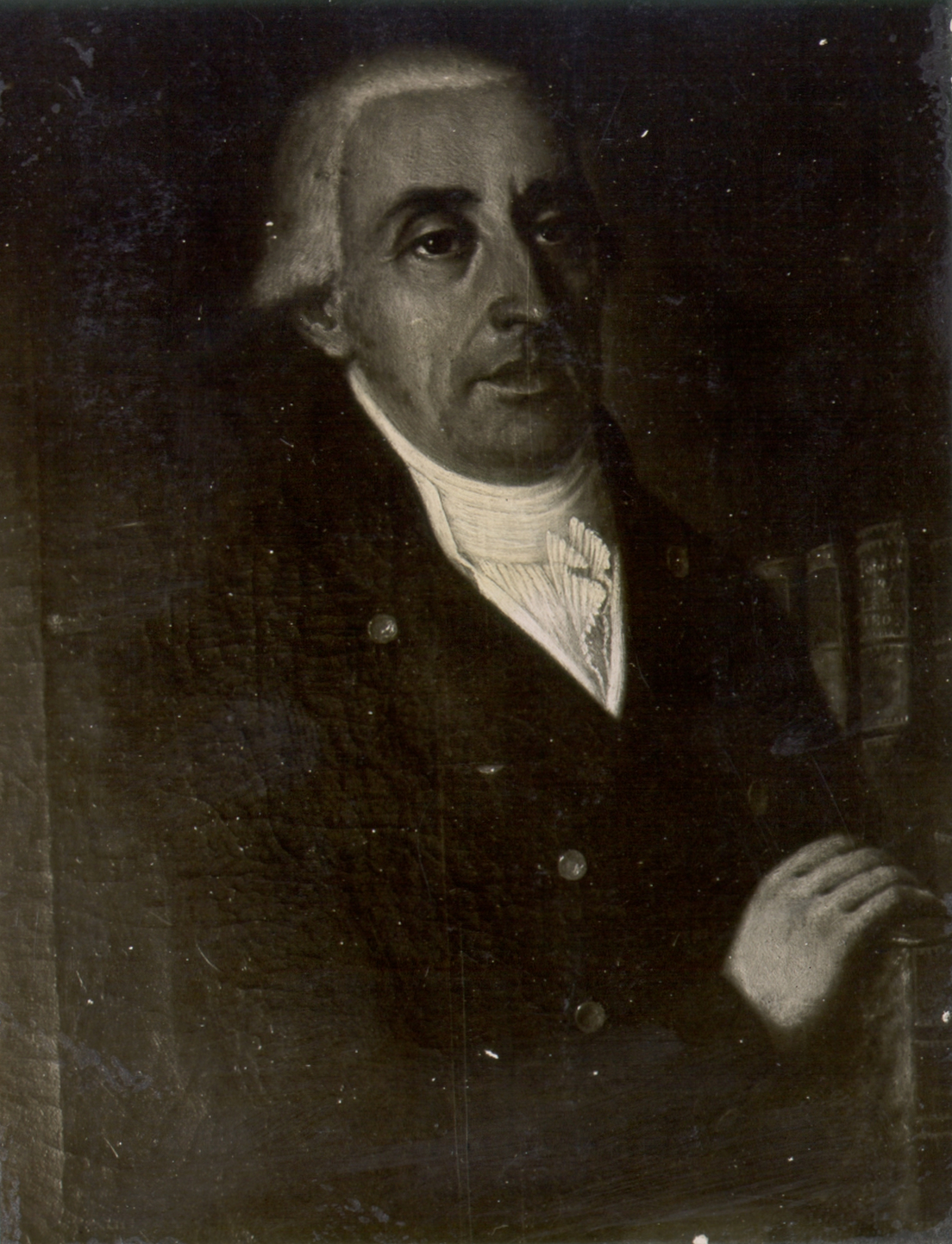
Josip Pototschnig

Josip Pototschnig was a politician of the 18th century in Slovenia, when the country was under the Holy Roman Empire. He became mayor of Ljubljana in 1782. He was succeeded by Peter Fister in 1788.
