= Anton Raab =

Slovenian politician

Anton Raab was a politician of the 18th century in Slovenia, when the country was under the Holy Roman Empire. He became mayor of Ljubljana in 1738. He was succeeded by Jurij Ambrož Kappus in 1742.
