= Janez Lindauer =

Janez Lindauer was a politician in Slovenia during the early 16th century when it was under the Holy Roman Empire. He became mayor of Ljubljana in 1509. He was succeeded by Volk Meditsch in 1511.
