= Janez Krstnik Verbetz =

Janez Krstnik Verbetz was a politician in the early 17th century in Slovenia when the country was under the Holy Roman Empire. He became mayor of Ljubljana in 1623. He was succeeded by Jurij Viditsch in 1624.
