= Volk Guertner =

Volk Guertner was a politician of the late 16th century in Slovenia when the country was under the Holy Roman Empire. He became mayor of Ljubljana in 1584. He was succeeded by Jakob De Curtoni in 1588.
