= Janez Dolnitscher =

Janez Dolnitscher was a politician of the late 17th century in Slovenia, under the Holy Roman Empire. He became mayor of Ljubljana in 1692. He was succeeded by Matija Di Georgio in 1697.
