= Veit Khisl =

Slovenian politician

Veit Khisl (Slovenized as Vid Khissel) was a politician in Slovenia during the first half of the 16th century, when it was under the Holy Roman Empire. He became mayor of Ljubljana in 1533. He was succeeded by Hans Weilhammer in 1536.
