= Andrej Sallitinger =

Mayor of Ljubljana

Andrej Sallitinger was a politician of the late 16th century and early 17th century in Slovenia when the country was under the Holy Roman Empire. He became mayor of Ljubljana in 1601. He was succeeded by Mihael Preiss in 1605.
