= Mihail Etropolski =

American fencer (born 1984)

Mihail Etropolski (born April 20, 1984) is a nationally ranked American sabre fencer.
