= Jurij Cherednikov =

Jurij Cherednikov (born 1964) is a Ukrainian-American author and software engineer. He was the first representative of the Union Mundial pro Interlingua in Ukraine and co-founder of the Ukrainian Interlingua Society.

He was born in Odessa to a family of doctors. In 1981, he graduated from the Polytechnic Institute of Odessa with a Diploma of Honor in Computational Engineering, becoming a specialist in that field. Soon after his graduation, he learned about Interlingua from his friend Konstantin Romalis. He found that he could easily understand texts in Interlingua without prior study.

He entered the University of Odessa in 1986 to study French philology by correspondence. He graduated with a Diploma of Honor in this field, having dedicated his work toward the degree to Interlingua. He wrote a brief Interlingua grammar and Interlingua-Russian dictionary. He then translated and adapted Ingvar Stenstrom's renowned manual "Interlingua - instrumento moderne de communication international" for speakers of Russian. He authored Interlingva: mezhdinarodnij jazijk (Interlingua: lingua international).

He accepted the post of Interlingua representative in 1992. Two years later, he founded the Ukrainian Interlingua Society with Victor Sitnichenko, the Vice Director of the scientific institute where he worked, and Victor Chebotar, docent of French Philology at the University of Odessa. Cherednikov was appointed President. In 1996, the Society organized the first Conference of Ukrainian Interlinguists in Odessa.

The Ukrainian economy was deteriorating, and in 1998, Jurij Cherednikov departed for the United States with his family to work as a software engineer. He lives there today with his wife, Alla, and two daughters, Julia and Raia.
