= Janez Sonze =

Janez Sonze was a politician of the early 17th century in Slovenia when the country was under the Holy Roman Empire. He became mayor of Ljubljana in 1608. He was succeeded by Janez Krstnik Gedenelli in 1610.
