= Anton Fran Wagner =

Slovenian politician

Anton Fran Wagner (1712 in Wiener Neustadt – 1782, Ljubljana) was a politician of the 18th century in Slovenia, when the country was under the Holy Roman Empire. He became mayor of Ljubljana in 1775. He was succeeded by Janez Friderik Egger in 1782. During his tenure he was also a pharmacist.
