= Janez Krstnik Dolnitscher =

Janez Krstnik Dolnitscher was a politician of the 17th century in Slovenia, when the country was under the Holy Roman Empire. He became mayor of Ljubljana in 1672. He was succeeded by Janez Jernej Bosio in 1679.
