= Peter Fister =

Peter Fister was a politician of the late 18th century in Slovenia, when the country was under the Holy Roman Empire. He became mayor of Ljubljana in 1788. He was succeeded by Anton Podobnik in 1796.
