= Ludwig Schönleben =

Ludwig Schönleben (1590 – August 26, 1663; Slovene: Ludvik) was a politician of the mid-17th century in what is now Slovenia, when the country was under the Holy Roman Empire.

Schönleben was born in Heilbronn. He became mayor of Ljubljana in 1648, and was succeeded by Jurij Wertatsch in 1650. Schönleben died in the city in 1663. He was the father of historian Johann Ludwig Schönleben.
