= Wolfgang Bosch =

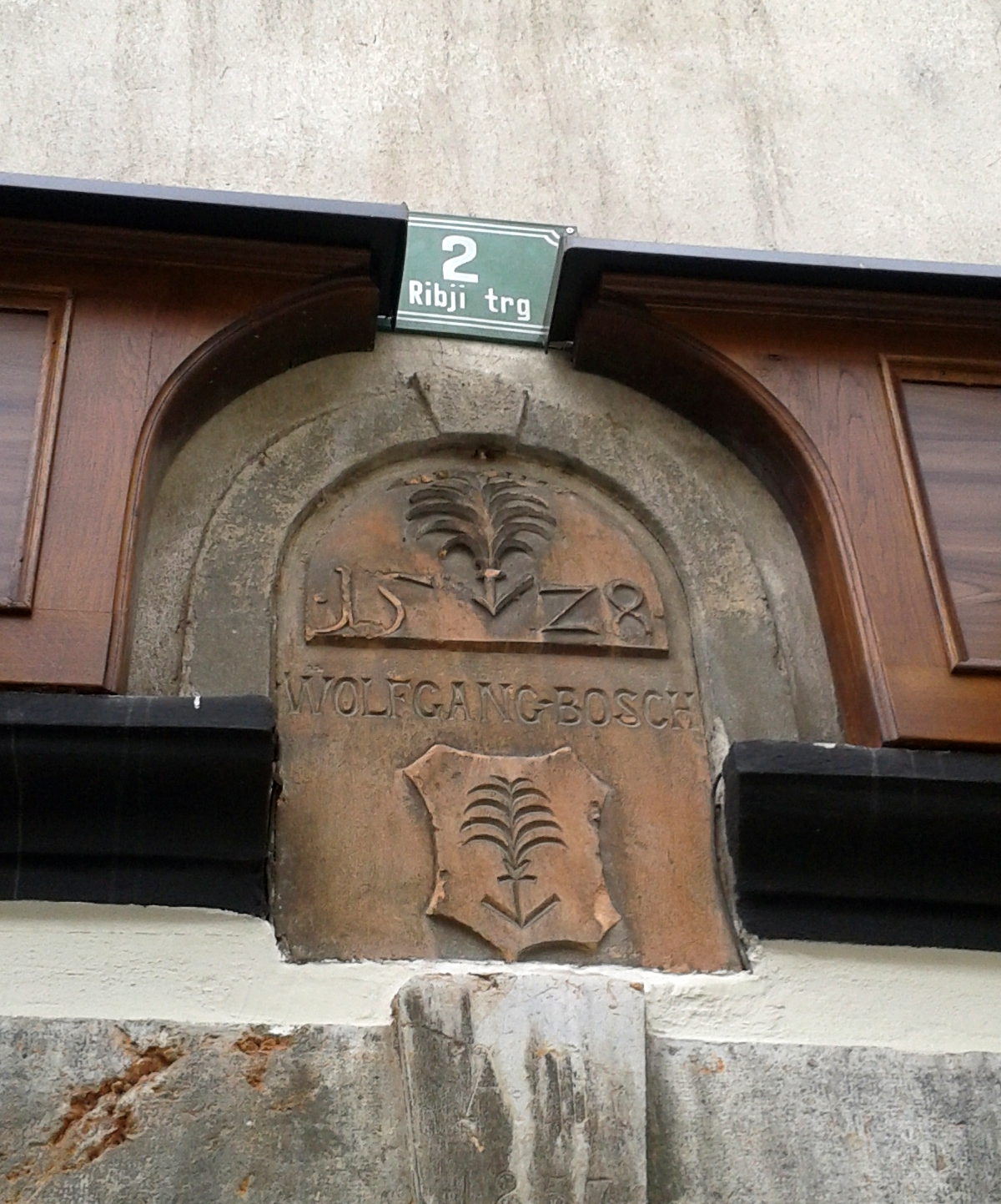
The plaque with the coat of arms of Wolfgang Bosch at Fish Square in Ljubljana

Wolfgang Bosch was a politician in Carniola during the early 16th century when it was under the Holy Roman Empire. He became mayor of Ljubljana in 1520 and was the first mayor of the city to serve a period of four years. He was succeeded by Jurij Gering in 1524.

In 1524 Posch built a house at Fish Square (Slovene: Ribji trg) in Ljubljana. Nowadays, it is the oldest dated house in the city. It bears a stone plaque with his coat of arms, his name, and the year of construction of the house. In 1562, the Protestant reformer Primož Trubar lived in it.
