= Volk Meditsch =

Volk Meditsch was a politician in Slovenia during the early 16th century when it was under the Holy Roman Empire. He became mayor of Ljubljana in 1511. He was succeeded by Matevz Frang in 1513.
