= Anton Janeshitsh =

Slovenian politician

Anton Janeshitsh was a politician of the early 18th century in Slovenia, when the country was under the Holy Roman Empire. He became mayor of Ljubljana in 1712. He was succeeded by Jakob Herendler in 1716.
