= Andrej Stropel =

Andrej Stropel was a politician of the early 17th century in Slovenia when the country was under the Holy Roman Empire. He became mayor of Ljubljana in 1631. He was succeeded by Kristof Otto in 1634.
