= Jakob Stettenfelder =

Jakob Stettenfelder was a politician active in Slovenia during the early 16th century when it was under the Holy Roman Empire. He became mayor of Ljubljana in 1507. He was succeeded by Janez Lindauer in 1509.
