= Janez Dorn =

Janez Dorn was a 16th-century politician in Slovenia, when the country was under the Holy Roman Empire. He became mayor of Ljubljana in 1548. He was succeeded by Jurij Tiffrer in 1552.
