= Lenard Chroen =

Slovenian politician

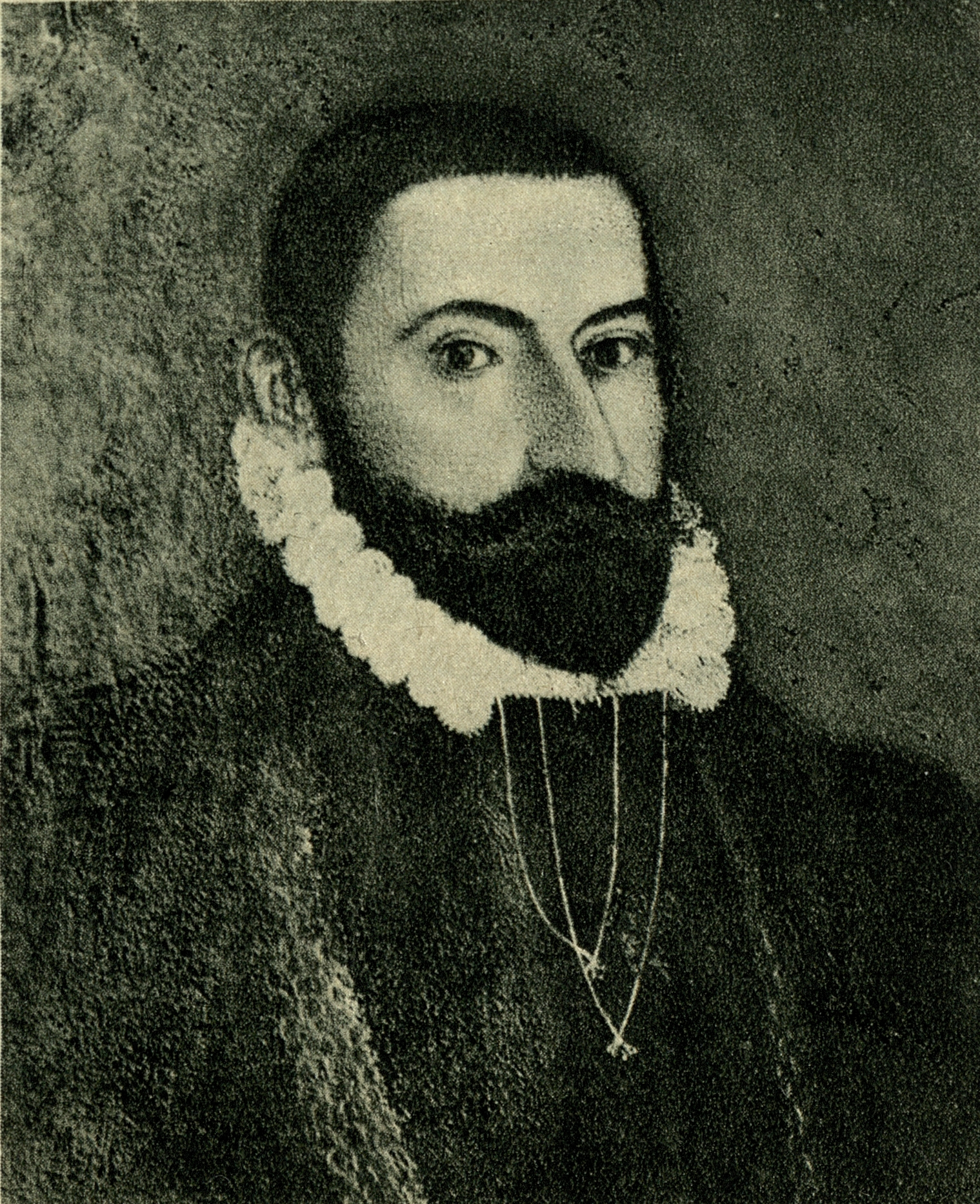

Mayor of Ljubljana
- In office 1565–1567
- Preceded by: Unknown
- Succeeded by: Mihael Vodapiuez

Personal details
- Children: Thomas Chroen (Prince-Bishop of Ljubljana)
- Profession: Politician

Lenard Chroen (former Kren) was a 16th-century politician in Slovenia when the country was under the Holy Roman Empire. He became mayor of Ljubljana in 1565. He was succeeded by Mihael Vodapiuez in 1567. He was father of the princebishop Thomas Chroen of Ljubljana.
