= Marko Stetner =

Marko Stetner was a 16th-century politician in Slovenia when the country was under the Holy Roman Empire. He became mayor of Ljubljana in 1582. He was succeeded by Volk Guertner in 1584.
