= Blaž Samerl =

Blaž Samerl was a 16th-century politician in Slovenia when the country was under the Holy Roman Empire. He became mayor of Ljubljana in 1559. He was succeeded by Marko Pregl in 1563.
