= 1997 Aerobic Gymnastics World Championships =

- Venue: Perth Congress Centre
- Location: Perth, Australia
- Start date: 31 May 1997
- End date: 1 June 1997

The 3rd Aerobic Gymnastics World Championships were held in Perth, Western Australia, on 31 May and 1 June 1997.

Four events were contested: men's individual, women's individual, mixed pairs, and trios. Competitors from four countries won the four events. Juanita Little of Australia won her country's first World gold medal in front of the home crowd.

== Results ==
=== Men's Individual ===
Rank	Gymnast	Country	Point
Gold medal	Kwang-Soo Park	South Korea	18.000
Silver medal	Kalojan Kaloinov	Bulgaria	17.150
Bronze medal	Andrei Nezezon	Romania	16.200

=== Women's Individual ===
Rank	Gymnast	Country	Point
Gold medal	Juanita Little	Australia	17.600
Silver medal	Yuriko Ito	Japan	17.450
Bronze medal	Chloe Maigre	France	17.050

=== Mixed Pair ===
Rank	Gymnasts	Country	Point
Gold medal	Kalojan Kaloinov, Konstantza Popova	Bulgaria	17.200
Silver medal	Tatiana Soloviola, Vladislav Oskner	Russia	17.100
Bronze medal	Alba de Las Heras, Jonatan Canada	Spain	16.300

=== Trio ===
Rank	Gymnasts	Country	Point
Gold medal	Andrei Nezezon, Claudiu Catalin Varlam, Claudiu Cristian Moldovan	Romania	15.800
Silver medal	Attila Katus, Tamas Katus, Romeo Szentgyorgyi	Hungary	15.600
Bronze medal	Maria Holmgren, Helene Nilsson, Kim Wickman	Sweden	15.052

=== Medal table ===
Rank	Nation	Gold	Silver	Bronze	Total
1	Bulgaria	1	1	0	2
2	Romania	1	0	1	2
3	Australia	1	0	0	1
3	South Korea	1	0	0	1
5	Hungary	0	1	0	1
5	Japan	0	1	0	1
5	Russia	0	1	0	1
8	Spain	0	0	1	1
8	France	0	0	1	1
8	Sweden	0	0	1	1
