= Janez Friderik Egger =

Janez Friderik Egger was a politician of the 18th century in Slovenia, when the country was under the Holy Roman Empire. He became mayor of Ljubljana in 1782. He was succeeded by Josip Pototschnig in 1786.
