= Gregor Lagner =

Gregor Lagner was a Slovenian politician of the early 16th century. He became mayor of Ljubljana in 1505. He was succeeded by Lenart Praunsperger in 1506.
