= Ignacio Capitani =

Argentine footballer

Personal information
- Full name: Ignacio Raúl Capitani
- Date of birth: March 9, 1987 (age 39)
- Place of birth: Rosario, Argentina
- Position: Midfielder

Senior career*
| Years | Team | Apps | (Gls) |
| 2007–2008 | Rosario Central | 0 | (0) |
| 2008–2009 | Atessa Val di Sangro | | |
| 2009–2010 | Castel di Sangro | | |
| 2010–2011 | Toma Maglie | | |
| 2011–2012 | El Tanque Sisley | | |
| 2012 | Sportivo Las Parejas | 8 | (2) |
| 2013 | San Luis | 11 | (0) |
| 2013 | Atlético Correa | | |
| 2014 | Alumni de Casilda | | |
| 2014 | José Gálvez | | |
| 2016–2019 | Unidos de Zavalla | | |
| 2020 | Alianza Deportiva Fuentes | | |
- * Club domestic league appearances and goals

Ignacio Raúl Capitani (born March 9, 1987) is an Argentine former footballer who played as a midfielder.

== Teams ==
A product of Rosario Central, Capitani played abroad for clubs in Italy, Uruguay, Chile and Peru. He ended his career at minor categories of the Argentine football.

- (Argentina) Rosario Central 2007–2009
- (Italy) Castel di Sangro 2009–2010
- (Italy) Toma Maglie 2010–2011
- (Uruguay) El Tanque Sisley 2011–2012
- (Argentina) Sportivo Las Parejas 2012
- (Chile) San Luis de Quillota 2013
