= Izabela Lăcătuș =

Romanian gymnast (born 1976)

- Full name: Izabela Daniela Lăcătuș
- Born: 2 October 1976 (age 49) Bucharest

Gymnastics career
- Discipline: Women's artistic gymnastics, Aerobic Gymnastics
- Country represented: Romania
- Club: CSS Triumf
- Head coaches: Octavian Belu, Maria Fumea
- Assistant coach: Mariana Bitang
Medal record
World Games
Gold medal – first place	2001 Akita	Individual
Silver medal – second place	2005 Duisburg	Mixed pairs
Bronze medal – third place	2005 Duisburg	Individual
Aerobic Gymnastics World Championships
Gold medal – first place	2000 Riesa	Individual
Silver medal – second place	2002 Klaipeda	Individual
Silver medal – second place	2000 Riesa	Mixed pairs
Silver medal – second place	1999 Hannover	Individual
Bronze medal – third place	2004 Sofia	Mixed pairs
Bronze medal – third place	2002 Klaipeda	Mixed pairs
Bronze medal – third place	1998 Catania	Mixed pairs
Bronze medal – third place	1998 Catania	Individual
Aerobic Gymnastics European Championships
Gold medal – first place	2005 Coimbra	Individual
Gold medal – first place	2005 Coimbra	Groups
Gold medal – first place	2003 Debrecen	Mixed Pairs
Gold medal – first place	2001 Zaragoza	Individual
Silver medal – second place	2003 Debrecen	Individual
Silver medal – second place	2001 Zaragoza	Mixed Pairs
Silver medal – second place	1999 Birmingham	Individual
Bronze medal – third place	1999 Birmingham	Mixed Pairs

Izabela Daniela Lăcătuș (born 2 October 1976 in Bucharest, Romania) is a retired Romanian artistic and aerobic gymnast. She was an alternate to the artistic gymnastics team at the 1992 Olympics. After retiring from artistic gymnastics, she had a career in aerobic gymnastics, winning 16 world and continental medals, including the 2000 individual world title.

== Artistic gymnastics career ==
Lăcătuș started gymnastics at the CSS Triumf club in her hometown, Bucharest, but later moved to Deva, where she trained with the national team. She progressed rapidly, and in 1989, she moved up to the senior team and trained alongside Daniela Silivaș. In 1990, following the Revolution, the gym at Deva closed, and Lăcătuș went to train at the Olympic Center in Onești.

Although still a junior according to FIG rules, she participated in 1990 in competitions reserved for seniors as well as in junior meets. Her best results in 1990 were a 4th all-around finish at the Chunichi Cup and a 5th all-around finish at the Avignion Junior International. By the end of 1990, the gym at Deva opened again and the national team was reinstated.

Lăcătuș missed the 1991 Romanian International due to an injury, but she competed in the Junior European Championships, where she placed 4th all around. Later that year, she won silver in the all-around at the Cottbus Cup. In 1992, she won silver on bars at the Romanian International and earned a place as the second alternate to the 1992 Romanian Olympic team. The other members of the team were Cristina Bontaș, Lavinia Miloșovici, Gina Gogean, Mirela Pașca, Maria Neculiță and Vanda Hădărean. Eugenia Popa was the first alternate.

Lăcătuș competed at several meets in 1992, but an ankle injury sidelined her for the rest of the year. She did not manage to make a full recovery and retired in 1994.

== Post-1994 and aerobic gymnastics career ==
In 1994, Lăcătuș started to train for aerobic gymnastics at CSS Triumf with coach Maria Fumea, and to coach the lower-level gymnasts at the same club. She enrolled at the Sports University in Bucharest with the hope of becoming a coach after graduation.

Lăcătuș also performed in the Aeros entertainment show. Among her colleagues at Aeros were Daniela Mărănducă, Lăcrămioara Filip, Cristian Leric and Remus Nicolai.

Her debut as an aerobic gymnast in an international event was at the 1st World Aerobic Gymnastics Championships in Paris in 1995. During her aerobic gymnastics career, she competed in the individual event, mixed pairs and groups. Her partners in the mixed pair event were Claudiu Varlam (until 1999) and Remus Nicolai (after 1999). Individually, she won four world championship medals (gold in 2000, silver in 1999 and 2002, and bronze in 1998) and four European championship medals (gold in 2001 and 2005, and silver in 1999 and 2003). She also placed 5th in the individual event at the 2004 world championships.

In the mixed pairs event, she won one silver and three bronze medals at the world championships (2000, 1998, 2002, 2004) and three continental medals (gold in 2003, silver in 2001 and bronze in 1999). She also placed seventh in mixed pairs at the 1997 world championships.

In the group event, she won the continental title in 2005 and placed fourth at the 2006 world championships.

== Post-retirement ==
Lăcătuș retired after the 2006 world championships. She is currently coaching aerobic gymnastics at the CSS Triumf club in Bucharest.
