= Krištof Stern =

Slovenian politician

Krištof Stern was a politician in Slovenia during the first half of the 16th century when it was under the Holy Roman Empire. He became mayor of Ljubljana in 1530. He was succeeded by Wilhelm Praunsperger in 1531.
