= Matija Bertolloti =

Matija Bertolloti was a politician of the 18th century in Slovenia, when the country was under the Holy Roman Empire. He became mayor of Ljubljana in 1770. He was succeeded by Janez Jurij Pilgram in 1772.
