= Matevž Fran Beer =

Slovenian politician

Matevž Fran Beer was a politician of the 18th century in Slovenia, when the country was under the Holy Roman Empire. He became mayor of Ljubljana in 1751 and was one of the longest serving mayors in the history of the city with a term of 13 years. He was succeeded by Fran Gamba in 1764.
