= Fran Gamba =

Slovenian politician

Fran Gamba was a politician of the 18th century in Slovenia, when the country was under the Holy Roman Empire. He became mayor of Ljubljana in 1764. He was succeeded by Janez Mihael Kuk in 1766.
