= Janez Steringer =

Slovenian politician

Janez Steringer was a politician of the 17th century in Slovenia, when the country was under the Holy Roman Empire. He became mayor of Ljubljana in 1657. He was succeeded by Janez Maria Pisckhon in 1663.
