= Fran Cirian =

Fran Cirian was a politician of the 17th century in Slovenia, when the country was under the Holy Roman Empire. He became mayor of Ljubljana in 1647. He was succeeded by Ljudevit Schonleben in 1648.
