= Adam Weiss =

Slovenian politician

Adam Weiss was a politician of the early 17th century in Slovenia when the country was under the Holy Roman Empire. He became mayor of Ljubljana in 1619. He was succeeded by Janez Krstnik Verbetz in 1623.
