= Matevž Frang =

Matevz Frang was a politician in Slovenia during the early 16th century when it was under the Holy Roman Empire. He became mayor of Ljubljana in 1513. He was succeeded by Jurij Tazel in 1514.
