= Gregor Khunstl =

Gregor Khunstl was a politician of the 17th century in Slovenia when the country was under the Holy Roman Empire. He became mayor of Ljubljana in 1638. He was succeeded by Marko Wiz in 1640.
