= Primož Huebman =

Slovenian politician

Primoz Huebman was a politician in Slovenia during the first half of the 16th century when it was under the Holy Roman Empire. He became mayor of Ljubljana in 1528. He was succeeded by Peter Reicher in 1529.
