= Anton Podobnik =

Anton Podobnik was a politician of the late 18th century in Slovenia, when the country was under the Holy Roman Empire. He became mayor of Ljubljana in 1796. He was succeeded by Josip Kokail in 1797.
