= Matija Di Georgio =

Matija Di Georgio was a politician of the late 17th century in Slovenia, when the country was under the Holy Roman Empire. He became mayor of Ljubljana in 1697. He was succeeded by Janez Graffenhueber in 1699.
