= Janez Standinath =

Slovenian politician

Janez Standinath was a politician in Slovenia during the early 16th century when it was under the Holy Roman Empire. He became mayor of Ljubljana in 1518. He was succeeded by Volk Posch in 1520.
