= Pongrac Lustaller =

Pongrac Lustaller was a politician in Slovenia during the first half of the 16th century when it was under the Holy Roman Empire.

== Professional career ==
He became mayor of Ljubljana in 1526. He was succeeded by Primoz Huebman in 1528.
