= Jurij Tazel =

Slovenian politician

Jurij Tazel was a politician in Slovenia during the early 16th century when it was under the Holy Roman Empire. He became mayor of Ljubljana in 1514. He was succeeded by Anton Lantheri in 1516.
