= 1999 Aerobic Gymnastics European Championships =

The 1st Aerobic Gymnastics European Championships was held in Birmingham, United Kingdom from 2 to 5 December 1999.

== Results ==
Event	Gold	Silver	Bronze
Men's individual	Olivier Florid (FRA)	Halldör Birgir Johannsson (ISL)	Claudiu Moldovan (ROU)
Women's individual	Giovanna Lecis (ITA)	Izabela Lacatus (ROU)	Ludmilla Kovatcheva (BUL)
Mixed Pairs	Russia	France	Romania
Trios	Romania	France	Hungary
Groups	Romania	Hungary	France

=== Medal table ===
Rank	Nation	Gold	Silver	Bronze	Total
1	Romania	2	1	2	5
2	France	1	2	1	4
3	Italy	1	0	0	1
3	Russia	1	0	0	1
5	Hungary	0	1	1	2
6	Iceland	0	1	0	1
7	Bulgaria	0	0	1	1
Totals (7 entries)		5	5	5	15
