= Marko Pregl =

Marko Pregl was a 16th-century politician in Slovenia when the country was under the Holy Roman Empire. He became mayor of Ljubljana in 1563. He was succeeded by Lenard Chroen in 1565.
