= Gabriel Eder =

Gabriel Eder was a politician of the late 17th century in Slovenia, when the country was under the Holy Roman Empire. He first became mayor of Ljubljana in 1688. He was then succeeded by Janez Dolnitscher in 1692, but was remade mayor again in 1702, serving until 1710. In total he served 12 years as mayor, one of the longest in the history of Ljubljana.
