= Mihael Rosen =

Mayor of Ljubljana, 1595–1598

Mihael Rosen (died 1598) was a politician of the late 16th century in Slovenia when the country was under the Holy Roman Empire. He became mayor of Ljubljana in 1595. He was succeeded by Anton Feichtinger in 1598.
