= Janez Mihael Kuk =

18th century Slovenian politician

Janez Mihael Kuk was a politician of the 18th century in Slovenia, when the country was under the Holy Roman Empire. He became mayor of Ljubljana in 1766. He was succeeded by Matija Bertolloti in 1770.
