= Mihael Preiss =

Mihael Preiss was a politician of the early 17th century in Slovenia when the country was under the Holy Roman Empire. He became mayor of Ljubljana in 1605. He was succeeded by Janez Vodapiuez in 1607.
