= Jurij Gering =

Jurij Gering was a politician in Slovenia during the first half of the 16th century when it was under the Holy Roman Empire. He became mayor of Ljubljana in 1524. He was succeeded by Pongrac Lustaller in 1526.
