= Lenart Praunsperger =

Lenart Praunsperger was a Slovenian politician of the early 16th century. He became mayor of Ljubljana in 1506. He was succeeded by Jakob Stettenfelder in 1507.
