= Janez Vodapiuez =

Slovenian politician

Janez Vodapiuez was a politician of the early 17th century in Slovenia when the country was under the Holy Roman Empire. He became mayor of Ljubljana in 1607. He was succeeded by Janez Sonze in 1608.
