= Janez Jurij Pilgram =

Janez Jurij Pilgram was a politician of the 18th century in Slovenia, when the country was under the Holy Roman Empire. He became mayor of Ljubljana in 1772. He was succeeded by Janez Nepomuk Mikolitsch in 1774.
