= Alice Capitani =

Italian gymnast

- Born: 27 October 1984 (age 40); Rome, Italy

Gymnastics career
- Discipline: Women's artistic gymnastics
- Country represented: Italy

Alice Capitani (born 27 October 1984) is an Italian former gymnast. She competed at the 2000 Summer Olympics.
