= Josip Kokail =

Josip Kokail was a politician of the late 18th and early 19th century in Slovenia, when the country was under the Holy Roman Empire. He became mayor of Ljubljana in 1797 and became the second-longest-serving mayor in the history of the city, serving a term of 15 years. He was succeeded by Anton Codelli in 1812.
