= Hans Weilhammer =

Slovenian politician

Hans Weilhammer (first name also spelled Hanns, last name also spelled Weilheimer; Slovenized as Janez or Janž Weilhammer) was a sixteenth-century politician in Slovenia when the country was under the Holy Roman Empire. Weilhammer may have come to Ljubljana from Salzburg. He became mayor of Ljubljana in 1536 and was the first mayor to serve a term of eight years, double the previous longest term. He was succeeded by Volk Gebhardt in 1544.
