= 1996 Aerobic Gymnastics World Championships =

- Venue: Nederlandse Congresgebouw
- Location: The Hague, The Netherlands
- Start date: 19 October 1996
- End date: 20 October 1996

The 2nd Aerobic Gymnastics World Championships were held in The Hague, Netherlands on 19 and 20 October 1996.

Four events were contested: men's individual, women's individual, mixed pairs, and trios. Competitors from four countries won the four events.

== Results ==
=== Men's Individual ===
Rank	Gymnast	Country	Point
Gold medal	Kwang-Soo Park	South Korea	36.700
Silver medal	Kalojan Kaloinov	Bulgaria	36.000
Bronze medal	Claudio Franzen	Brazil	34.000

=== Women's Individual ===
Rank	Gymnast	Country	Point
Gold medal	Isamara Secati	Brazil	37.400
Silver medal	Juanita Little	Australia	36.300
Bronze medal	Chloe Maigre	France	34.800

=== Mixed Pair ===
Rank	Gymnasts	Country	Point
Gold medal	Alba de Las Heras, Jonatan Canada	Spain	37.900
Silver medal	Pedro Faccio, Erica Faccio	Brazil	36.700
Bronze medal	Tatiana Soloviola, Vladislav Oskner	Russia	35.550

=== Trio ===
Rank	Gymnasts	Country	Point
Gold medal	Andrei Nezezon, Claudiu Catalin Varlam, Claudiu Cristian Moldovan	Romania	37.800
Silver medal	Hyun-Sung Kim, Kwang-Soo Park, In-Suk Chung	South Korea	33.650
Bronze medal	Attila Katus, Tamas Katus, Romeo Szentgyorgyi	Hungary	33.300

=== Medal table ===
Rank	Nation	Gold	Silver	Bronze	Total
1	Brazil	1	1	1	3
2	South Korea	1	1	0	2
3	Spain	1	0	0	1
3	Romania	1	0	0	1
5	Australia	0	1	0	1
5	Bulgaria	0	1	0	1
7	France	0	0	1	1
7	Hungary	0	0	1	1
7	Russia	0	0	1	1
