= Mihăileni =

Mihăileni may refer to several places in Romania:

- Mihăileni, Botoșani, a commune in Botoşani County
- Mihăileni, Harghita, a commune in Harghita County
- Mihăileni, Sibiu, a commune in Sibiu County
- Mihăileni, a village in Șimonești Commune, Harghita County
- Mihăileni, a village in Buceș Commune, Hunedoara County

and several places in Moldova:

- Mihăileni, Rîşcani, a commune in Rîşcani district
- Mihăileni, Briceni, a commune in Briceni district
- Mihăilenii Noi, a village in Vasileuţi Commune, Rîşcani district

== See also ==
- Mihai (name)
- Mihăești (disambiguation)
- Mihăiești (disambiguation)
- Mihăilești
