= Mihăești =

Mihăeşti may refer to:

- Mihăești, Argeș, a commune in Argeș County, Romania
- Mihăești, Olt, a commune in Olt County, Romania
- Mihăești, Vâlcea, a commune in Vâlcea County, Romania

== See also ==
- Mihai (name)
- Mihăiești (disambiguation)
- Mihăileni (disambiguation)
- Mihăilești
