= Cristian Moldovan =

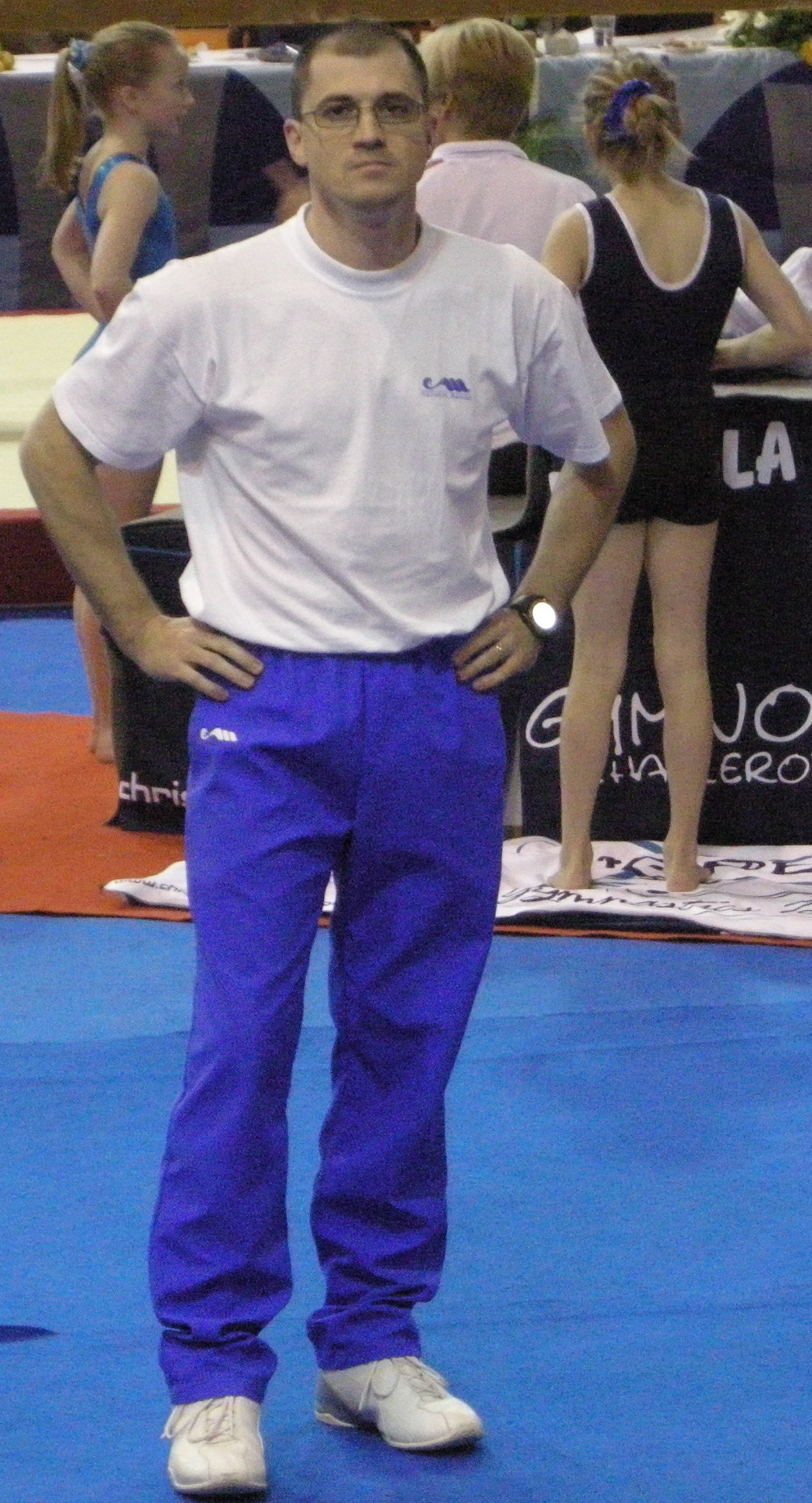

Personal information
- Full name: Claudiu Cristian Moldovan
- Nickname: Cris
- Born: 20 September 1974 (age 51) Târgu Mureș

Gymnastics career
- Discipline: Aerobic gymnastics
- Country represented: Romania
- Club: CSS 1 Farul Constanta
- Head coach: Maria Fumea
Medal record
Aerobic Gymnastics World Championships
| Gold medal – first place | 2000 Riesa | Trio |
| Gold medal – first place | 1997 Perth | Trio |
| Gold medal – first place | 1996 La Haye | Trio |
| Silver medal – second place | 1998 Catania | Trio |
| Silver medal – second place | 1995 Paris | Trio |
| Bronze medal – third place | 2000 Riesa | Individual |
| Bronze medal – third place | 1999 Hannover | Trio |
Aerobic Gymnastics European Championships
| Gold medal – first place | 1999 Birmingham | Trio |
| Bronze medal – third place | 1999 Birmingham | Individual |

Claudiu Cristian Moldovan (born 20 September 1976 in Târgu Mureș) is a retired Romanian aerobic gymnast. He had a successful career winning seven world championships medals (three gold, two silver and two bronze) and two European championships medals (one gold and one bronze). After retiring from aerobic gymnastics, he has been a coach for the junior national women's artistic gymnastics team. Among many gymnasts, he coached young Diana Chelaru, Larisa Iordache and Diana Bulimar.
