= Mihael Frankovitsch =

Mihael Frankovitsch was a 16th-century politician in Slovenia when the country was under the Holy Roman Empire. He became mayor of Ljubljana in 1555. He was succeeded by Blaž Samerl in 1559.
