= Jurij Tiffrer =

Slovenian politician

Jurij Tiffrer was a 16th-century politician in Slovenia when the country was under the Holy Roman Empire. He became mayor of Ljubljana in 1552. He was succeeded by Mihael Frankovitsch in 1555.
