= 2003 Aerobic Gymnastics European Championships =

The 3rd Aerobic Gymnastics European Championships was held in Debrecen, Hungary, October 24–26, 2003.

== Results ==
Event	Gold	Silver	Bronze
Men's individual	Grégory Alcan (FRA)	Remus Nicolai (ROU)	Vito Iaia (ITA)
Women's individual	Giovanna Lecis (ITA)	Izabela Lacatus (ROU)	Ana Maçanita (POR)
Mixed Pairs	Romania	Italy	Spain
Trios	Spain	Romania	France
Groups	Romania	Russia	France

=== Medal table ===
Rank	Nation	Gold	Silver	Bronze	Total
1	Romania	2	3	0	5
2	Italy	1	1	1	3
3	France	1	0	2	3
4	Spain	1	0	1	2
5	Russia	0	1	0	1
6	Portugal	0	0	1	1
Totals (6 entries)		5	5	5	15
