= Jurij Wertatsch =

Jurij Wertatsch was a politician of the mid 17th century in Slovenia, when the country was under the Holy Roman Empire. He became mayor of Ljubljana in 1650. He was succeeded by Janez Steringer in 1657.
