= Mihăiești =

Mihăieşti may refer to several villages in Romania:

- Mihăieşti, a village in Bistra Commune, Alba County
- Mihăieşti, a village in Sânpaul Commune, Cluj County
- Mihăieşti, a village in Dobra Commune, Hunedoara County
- Mihăieşti, a village in Horodniceni Commune, Suceava County

== See also ==
- Mihai (name)
- Mihăești (disambiguation)
- Mihăileni (disambiguation)
- Mihăilești
