= Jurij Ambrož Kappus =

Jurij Ambrož Kappus was a politician of the 18th century in Slovenia, when the country was under the Holy Roman Empire. He became mayor of Ljubljana in 1742 and was one of the longest serving mayors in the history of the city with a term of 13 years. He was succeeded by Matevž Fran Beer in 1751.
