= 2001 Aerobic Gymnastics European Championships =

The 2nd Aerobic Gymnastics European Championships was held in Zaragoza, Spain, November 23–25, 2001.

== Results ==
Event	Gold	Silver	Bronze
Men's individual	Jonatan Cañada (ESP)	Grégory Alcan (FRA)	Halldör Birgir Johannsson (ISL)
Women's individual	Izabela Lacatus (ROU)	Giovanna Lecis (ITA)	Ludmilla Kovatcheva (BUL)
Mixed Pairs	France	Romania	Russia
Trios	Bulgaria	Romania	France
Groups	Romania	France	Russia

=== Medal table ===
Rank	Nation	Gold	Silver	Bronze	Total
1	Romania	2	2	0	4
2	France	1	2	1	4
3	Bulgaria	1	0	1	2
4	Spain	1	0	0	1
5	Italy	0	1	0	1
6	Russia	0	0	2	2
7	Iceland	0	0	1	1
Totals (7 entries)		5	5	5	15
