= Jakob De Curtoni =

Jakob De Curtoni was a politician of the late 16th century in Slovenia when the country was under the Holy Roman Empire. He became mayor of Ljubljana in 1588. He was succeeded by Andreas Falkh in 1592.
