= Jurij Viditsch =

Slovenian politician

Jurij Viditsch was a politician of the early 17th century in Slovenia when the country was under the Holy Roman Empire. He was the Stadtrichter of Laibach (Ljubljana) in 1613, 1614, 1617 and 1618. He served as mayor of the city in 1624. He received the mayor's annual salary of 50 guilders in June 1625 retroactively, as was the custom at that time. He became mayor again in 1630.
