= Mihael Vodapiuez =

Mihael Vodapiuez was a 16th-century politician in Slovenia when the country was under the Holy Roman Empire. He became mayor of Ljubljana in 1567. He was succeeded by Janez Phanner in 1571.
