= Claudiu Varlam =

Romanian aerobic gymnast

- Full name: Claudiu Catalin Varlam
- Born: 31 May 1975 (age 51) Braşov

Gymnastics career
- Discipline: Aerobic gymnastics
- Country represented: Romania
- Club: CSS 1 Farul Constanta
- Head coach: Maria Fumea
Medal record
Aerobic Gymnastics World Championships
Gold medal – first place	1997 Perth	Trio
Gold medal – first place	1996 La Haye	Trio
Silver medal – second place	1998 Catania	Trio
Silver medal – second place	1995 Paris	Trio
Bronze medal – third place	1998 Catania	Mixed Pair

Claudiu Varlam (born 31 May 1975 in Braşov, Romania) is a retired Romanian aerobic gymnast. He had a successful career winning five world championships medals (two gold, two silver and one bronze). After retiring from aerobic gymnastics he became a coach of the Romanian national aerobic gymnastics team.
