= 2010 Aerobic Gymnastics World Championships =

11th Aerobic Gymnastics World Championships were held in Rodez, France from 15 to 17 June 2010.

== Results ==
=== Women's Individual ===
| Rank | Gymnast | Country | Score |
|---|---|---|---|
| Gold medal | Marcela Matos Lopez | Brazil | 21.800 |
| Silver medal | Giulia Bianchi | Italy | 21.350 |
| Bronze medal | Angela McMillan | New Zealand | 21.250 |
| 4 | Sara Moreno | Spain | 21.100 |
| 5 | Jinxuan Huang | China | 21.050 |
| 6 | Cristina Simona Nedelcu | Romania | 20.600 |
| 7 | Denitsa Parichkova | Bulgaria | 20.450 |
| 8 | Roypim Ngampeeranpong | Thailand | 20.200 |

=== Men's Individual ===
| Rank | Gymnast | Country | Score |
|---|---|---|---|
| Gold medal | Morgan Jacquemin | France | 22.250 |
| Silver medal | Mircea Zamfir | Romania | 21.600 |
| Bronze medal | Kieran Gorman | Australia | 21.500 |
| 4 | Ivan Parejo | Spain | 21.500 |
| 5 | Xiaofeng Zhou | China | 21.450 |
| 6 | Emanuele Pagliuca | Italy | 21.830 |
| 7 | Benjamin Garavel | France | 20.950 |
| 8 | Zsolt Roik | Hungary | 19.800 |

=== Mixed Pairs ===
| Rank | Gymnasts | Country | Score |
|---|---|---|---|
| Gold medal | Sara Moreno, Vincente Lli | Spain | 21.750 |
| Silver medal | Aurélie Joly, Julien Chaninet | France | 21.100 |
| Bronze medal | Cristina Simona Nedelcu, Tudorel-Valentin Mavrodineanu | Romania | 21.000 |
| 4 | Julia Bianchi, Emanuele Pagiuca | Italy | 20.800 |
| 5 | Eugenie Raphael, Gaylord Oubrier | France | 20.550 |
| 6 | Hyun Kyung Shin, Gountaek Kim | South Korea | 20.500 |
| 7 | Polina Amosenok, Garsevan Dzhanazyan | Russia | 20.500 |
| 8 | Kyung Ho Lee, Yeon Sun Park | South Korea | 19.950 |

=== Trios ===
| Rank | Gymnasts | Country | Score |
|---|---|---|---|
| Gold medal | Le Tao, Lei Che, Yong Qin | China | 22.250 |
| Silver medal | Valentin Mavrodineanu, Petru Porime Tolan, Mircea Zamfir | Romania | 22.100 |
| Bronze medal | Morgan Jacquemen, Benjamin Garavel, Nicolas Garavel | France | 21.250 |
| 4 | Irina Klopova, Veronica Koroneva, Evgeniya Kudymova | Russia | 20.942 |
| 5 | Maxim Grinin, Igor Trushkov, Kirill Lobanznyuk | Russia | 20.&50 |
| 6 | Ba Dong Vu, Tien Phuong Nguyen, Thi Thu Ha Tran | Vietnam | 21.739 |
| 7 | Junwei Wang, Tong Zhang, Pei Wang | China | 20.400 |
| 8 | Vito Iaia, Antonio Caforio, Emanuele Pagliuca | Italy | 20.300 |

=== Groups ===
| Rank | Gymnast | Country | Score |
|---|---|---|---|
| Gold medal | Valentin Mavrodineanu, Petru Porime Tolan, Mircea Zamfir, Florin Nebunu, Cosmin Darius Muj, Bogdan Popa | Romania | 21.650 |
| Silver medal | Le Tao, Lei Che, Chao Liu, Pei Wang, Yong Qin, Junwei Wang | China | 21.550 |
| Bronze medal | Gaylord Oubrier, Benjamin Garavel, Morgan Jacquemin, Nicolas Garavel, Aurelie Joly, Julien Chaninet | France | 21.139 |
| 4 | Igor Trushkov, Kirill Lobaznyuk, Garsevan Dzhanazyan, Dimitry Ekimenko, Danil Chayun, Alexander Kondratichev | Russia | 20.850 |
| 5 | Inchan Hwang, Gountaeck Kim, Sungkyu Song, Taejin Park, Sunghwa Lee, Kyung Ho Lee | South Korea | 20.500 |
| 6 | Irina Klopova, Veronika Koronova, Evgeniya Chetvernya, Polina Amosenok, Azhella Korotkova, Evgeniya Kudymova | Russia | 20.434 |
| 7 | Cristina Antonescu, Oana Corina Constantin, Laura Andreea Cristache, Nadina Ionela Hotca, Cristina Nedelcu, Anca Claudia Surdu | Romania | 20.234 |
| 8 | Ylenia Giugno, Valentina Torcellan, Emanuele Pagliuca, Vito Iaia, Antonio Caforio, Luca Fancello | Italy | 20.107 |

=== Team ===
| Rank | Country | Points |
|---|---|---|
| Gold medal | Romania | 9 |
| Silver medal | France | 12 |
| Bronze medal | China | 20 |
| 4 | Italy | 24 |
| 5 | Russia | 26 |
| 6 | South Korea | 34 |
| 7 | Japan | 60 |
| 8 | Argentina | 73 |

=== Medal table ===
| Rank | Nation | Gold | Silver | Bronze | Total |
|---|---|---|---|---|---|
| 1 | Romania | 2 | 2 | 1 | 5 |
| 2 | France | 1 | 2 | 2 | 5 |
| 3 | China | 1 | 1 | 1 | 3 |
| 4 | Brazil | 1 | 0 | 0 | 1 |
| 4 | Spain | 1 | 0 | 0 | 1 |
| 6 | Italy | 0 | 1 | 0 | 1 |
| 7 | Australia | 0 | 0 | 1 | 1 |
| 7 | New Zealand | 0 | 0 | 1 | 1 |
| Totals (8 entries) | | 6 | 6 | 6 | 18 |
