= Gymnastics at the 2011 Summer Universiade =

Gymnastics at the XXVI Summer Universiade
- Venue: Futain Sports Park Gym and Bao'an District Gym
- Dates: August 13, 2011 – August 22, 2011

Gymnastics was contested at the 2011 Summer Universiade from August 13 to August 22 at the Bao'an District Gym (artistic and rhythmic competitions) and the Futain Sports Park Gym (aerobic competitions) in Shenzhen, China. In artistic gymnastics, team, individual all-around, and individual events were held for both men and women. In rhythmic gymnastics, individual and group competitions were held. In aerobic gymnastics, mixed pairs, trios, group, aero-dance, and aero-step competitions were held.

== Combined Medal table ==
Rank	Nation	Gold	Silver	Bronze	Total
1	China (CHN)	11	3	4	18
2	Russia (RUS)	6	11	4	21
3	Japan (JPN)	4	5	6	15
4	Romania (ROU)	2	2	4	8
5	South Korea (KOR)	2	0	2	4
6	Ukraine (UKR)	1	3	2	6
7	Australia (AUS)	1	0	0	1
7	Brazil (BRA)	1	0	0	1
9	Canada (CAN)	0	1	1	2
10	Azerbaijan (AZE)	0	1	0	1
10	Belgium (BEL)	0	1	0	1
10	France (FRA)	0	1	0	1
13	Belarus (BLR)	0	0	3	3
14	Chinese Taipei (TPE)	0	0	1	1
14	Hong Kong (HKG)	0	0	1	1
14	Italy (ITA)	0	0	1	1
Totals (16 entries)		28	28	29	85

== Artistic Gymnastics ==
The artistic gymnastics competition will be contested from August 13 to August 16.

=== Men's Events ===
Event	Gold	Silver	Bronze
Team all-around	Japan (JPN); Yodai Hōjō; Hiroki Ishikawa; Ryuzo Sejima; Masayoshi Yamamoto; Shoichi Yamamoto	China (CHN); Chen Xuezhang; Cheng Ran; Liu Rongbing; Wang Guanyin; Yang Shengchao	Romania (ROU); Cristian Bățagă; Marius Berbecar; Ovidiu Buidoso; Vlad Cotuna; Flavius Koczi
Individual all-around	Mykola Kuksenkov; Ukraine	Shoichi Yamamoto; Japan	Nathan Gafuik; Canada
Floor exercise	Flavius Koczi; Romania	Ryuzo Sejima; Japan	Shoichi Yamamoto; Japan
Pommel horse	Prashanth Sellathurai; Australia	Donna-Donny Truyens; Belgium	Flavius Koczi; Romania
Rings	Arthur Zanetti; Brazil	Samir Aït Saïd; France	Chen Chih-Yu; Chinese Taipei
Vault	Flavius Koczi; Romania	Nathan Gafuik; Canada	Cheng Ran; China
Parallel bars	Wang Guanyin; China	Marius Berbecar; Romania Liu Rongbing; China	—
Horizontal bar	Chen Xuezhang; China	Mykola Kuksenkov; Ukraine	Hiroki Ishikawa; Japan

=== Women's Events ===
Event	Gold	Silver	Bronze
Team all-around	Japan (JPN); Mai Yamagishi; Yuma Imanishi; Yu Minobe; Kyoko Oshima; Keiko Mukumoto	Ukraine (UKR); Yana Demyanchuk; Maryna Kostiuchenko; Angelina Kysla; Anastasia Koval; Valentina Holenkova	Russia (RUS); Irina Sazonova; Yulia Lozhechko; Ekaterina Skorodumova; Anna Myzdrikova; Alena Polyan
Individual all-around	Xiao Kangjun; China	Mai Yamagishi; Japan	Alena Polyan; Russia
Vault	Jo Hyun-Joo; South Korea	Anna Myzdrikova; Russia	Alena Polyan; Russia Wong Hiu Ying Angel; Hong Kong
Uneven bars	Yu Minobe; Japan	Mai Yamagishi; Japan	Angelina Kysla; Ukraine
Balance beam	Yu Minobe; Japan	Guan Wenli; China	Mai Yamagishi; Japan
Floor exercise	Alena Polyan; Russia	Keiko Mukumoto; Japan	Xiao Kangjun; China

== Medal table ==
Rank	Nation	Gold	Silver	Bronze	Total
1	Japan (JPN)	4	5	3	12
2	China (CHN)	3	3	2	8
3	Ukraine (UKR)	1	2	1	4
4	Russia (RUS)	1	1	3	5
5	Romania (ROU)	1	1	2	4
6	Australia (AUS)	1	0	0	1
6	Brazil (BRA)	1	0	0	1
6	South Korea (KOR)	1	0	0	1
9	Canada (CAN)	0	1	1	2
10	Belgium (BEL)	0	1	0	1
10	France (FRA)	0	1	0	1
12	Chinese Taipei (TPE)	0	0	1	1
12	Hong Kong (HKG)	0	0	1	1
Totals (13 entries)		13	15	14	42

== Rhythmic Gymnastics ==
The rhythmic gymnastics competition will be contested from August 20 to August 22.

=== Individual ===
Event	Gold	Silver	Bronze
Individual all-around	Yevgeniya Kanayeva; Russia	Daria Dmitrieva; Russia	Liubov Charkashyna; Belarus
Hoop	Yevgeniya Kanayeva; Russia	Alina Maksymenko; Ukraine	Deng Senyue; China
Ball	Yevgeniya Kanayeva; Russia	Daria Dmitrieva; Russia	Liubov Charkashyna; Belarus
Clubs	Yevgeniya Kanayeva; Russia	Aliya Garayeva; Azerbaijan	Alina Maksymenko; Ukraine
Ribbon	Daria Dmitrieva; Russia	Yevgeniya Kanayeva; Russia	Liubov Charkashyna; Belarus

=== Group ===
Event	Gold	Silver	Bronze
Group all-around	China (CHN); Liu Shu; Ma Qianhui; Wang Xue; Wang Yuting; Wu Mengran; Zou Lie	Russia (RUS); Alexandra Elyutina; Margarita Goncharova; Yulia Guryanova; Daria Kuvshinova; Anna Loman; Alexandra Makarova	Japan (JPN); Yurie Akashi; Saori Inagaki; Motoi Kasahara; Yurika Kurimoto; Kaho Okamoto; Kasumi Sakihama
5 balls	China (CHN); Liu Shu; Ma Qianhui; Wang Xue; Wang Yuting; Wu Mengran; Zou Lie	Russia (RUS); Alexandra Elyutina; Margarita Goncharova; Yulia Guryanova; Daria Kuvshinova; Anna Loman; Alexandra Makarova	Japan (JPN); Yurie Akashi; Saori Inagaki; Motoi Kasahara; Yurika Kurimoto; Kaho Okamoto; Kasumi Sakihama
3 ribbons + 2 hoops	China (CHN); Liu Shu; Ma Qianhui; Wang Xue; Wang Yuting; Wu Mengran; Zou Lie	Russia (RUS); Alexandra Elyutina; Margarita Goncharova; Yulia Guryanova; Daria Kuvshinova; Anna Loman; Alexandra Makarova	Japan (JPN); Yurie Akashi; Saori Inagaki; Motoi Kasahara; Yurika Kurimoto; Kaho Okamoto; Kasumi Sakihama

== Medal table ==
Rank	Nation	Gold	Silver	Bronze	Total
1	Russia (RUS)	5	6	0	11
2	China (CHN)	3	0	1	4
3	Ukraine (UKR)	0	1	1	2
4	Azerbaijan (AZE)	0	1	0	1
5	Belarus (BLR)	0	0	3	3
5	Japan (JPN)	0	0	3	3
Totals (6 entries)		8	8	8	24

== Aerobic ==
The aerobic gymnastics competition will be contested from August 20 to August 22.

Event	Gold	Silver	Bronze
Mixed pairs	China (CHN); Huang Jinxuan; Tao Le	Russia (RUS); Maxim Grinin; Evgeniya Kudymova	Italy (ITA); Giulia Bianchi; Emanuele Pagliuca
Trios	South Korea (KOR); Kim Guon Taeck; Lee Kyung Ho; Ryu Ju Sun	Russia (RUS); Alexander Kondratichev; Kirill Lobaznyuk; Igor Trushkov	Romania (ROU); Valentin Mavrodineanu; Petru Porime Tolan; Mircea Zamfir
Group	China (CHN); Che Lei; Li Liangfa; Liu Chao; Liu Tianbo; Tao Le; Wang Zizhuo	Russia (RUS); Danil Chayun; Garsevan Dzhanazyan; Valerii Gusev; Alexander Kondratichev; Kirill Lobaznyuk; Igor Trushkov	Romania (ROU); Andreea Bogati; Laura Andreea Cristache; Petru Porime Tolan; Anca Claudia Surdu; Mircea Zamfir
Aero-Dance	China (CHN); Che Lei; Huang Jinxuan; Lin Junxian; Liu Chao; Shou Minchao; Tao Le; Wang Yang; Zhao Sitong; Zheng Ziya; Zou Qin	Romania (ROU); Andreea Bogati; Laura Andreea Cristache; Valentin Mavrodineanu; Petru Porime Tolan; Anca Claudia Surdu; Mircea Zamfir	South Korea (KOR); Hwang In-Chan; Kim Eung Soo; Kim Sung Ho; Lee Jon Gu; Lee Kyung Ho; Ryu Ju Sun; Song Sung Kyu; Yoon Chang Il; Yoon Kwang Seok; Yun Tae Hee
Aero-Step	China (CHN); Huang Jinxuan; Lin Junxian; Qiao Dayan; Shou Minchao; Wang Yang; Xu Fan; Zhao Sitong; Zheng Ziya; Zou Qin	Russia (RUS); Polina Amosenok; Danil Chayun; Maxim Grinin; Olga Kislukhina; Veronika Korneva; Anzhella Korotkova; Evgeniya Kudymova; Kirill Lobaznyuk; Dmitrii Safonov; Denis Shurupov	South Korea (KOR); Choe Ha Neul; Jo Ye Ran; Kim Ji Un; Lee Sa Lang; Shim Mi-Hyun; Shin Hyun-Kyung
Team ranking	China (CHN) Romania (ROU)	—	Russia (RUS)

== Medal table ==
Rank	Nation	Gold	Silver	Bronze	Total
1	China (CHN)	5	0	0	5
2	Romania (ROU)	1	1	2	4
3	South Korea (KOR)	1	0	2	3
4	Russia (RUS)	0	4	1	5
5	Italy (ITA)	0	0	1	1
Totals (5 entries)		7	5	6	18
