= 2008 Aerobic Gymnastics World Championships =

10th Aerobic Gymnastics World Championships were held in Ulm, Germany from 25 to 27 April 2008.

== Results ==
=== Women's Individual ===
Rank	Gymnast	Country	Point
Gold medal	Marcela Lopez	Brazil	22.050
Silver medal	Cristina Simona Nedelcu	Romania	21.350
Bronze medal	Angela McMillan	New Zealand	21.200
4	Lili Yordanova	Bulgaria	21.150
5	Huang Jinxuan	China	20.850
6	Giula Bianchi	Italy	20.650
7	Aurélie Joly	France	20.600
8	Adrianna Ciucci	Italy	20.500
9	Elmira Dassaeva	Spain	20.250

=== Men's Individual ===
Rank	Gymnast	Country	Point
Gold medal	Ivan Parejo	Spain	22.400
Silver medal	Morgan Jacquemin	France	22.050
Bronze medal	Ao Jinping	China	22.050
4	Mircea Zamfir	Romania	21.900
5	Zsolt Roik	Hungary	21.250
6	Mircea Brinzea	Romania	20.800
7	Julien Chaninet	France	20.750
8	Alexander Kondratichev	Russia	20.500

=== Mixed Pair ===
Rank	Gymnasts	Country	Point
Gold medal	Aurélie Joly, Julien Chaninet	France	21.350
Silver medal	Cristina Antonescu, Mircea Brinzea	Romania	21.200
Bronze medal	Tudorel-Valentin Mavrodineanu, Cristina Simona Nedelcu	Romania	20.700
4	Juliana Antero, Marcisnei Oliveira	Brazil	20.700
5	Klopova Irina, Kuzin Stanislav	Russia	20.650
6	Huang Jinxuan, He Shijian	China	20.350
7	Margarita Stoyanova, Radoslov Zhivkov	Bulgaria	20.300
8	Chrystelle Alcan, Grégory Alcan	France	19.450

=== Trio ===
Rank	Gymnasts	Country	Point
Gold medal	Mircea Brinzea, Tudorel-Valentin Mavrodineanu, Mircea Zamfir	Romania	22.050
Silver medal	Zhang Peng, Qin Yong, Yu Wei	China	21.600
Bronze medal	Marcela Lopez, Cibele Rosito Oliani, Marina Lopez	Brazil	21.450
4	Xavier Julien, Grégory Alcan, Julien Chaninet	France	21.350
5	Morgan Jacquemin, Nicolas Garavel, Benjamin Garavel	France	21.150
6	Petru Porime Tolan, Popa Bogdan, Cosmin Muj	Romania	21.100
7	Nguyen Phuong, Tran Thuaha, Vu Dong	Vietnam	20.500
8	Vito Iaia, Antonio Caforio, Emanuele Pagliuca	Italy	20.500

=== Group ===
Rank	Gymnast	Country	Point
Gold medal	Zhang Peng, Qin Yong, He Shijian, Ao Jinping, Ni Zhen Hua, Yu Wei	China	21.650
Silver medal	Gaylord Oubrier, Xavier Julien, Morgan Jacquemin, Adrien Galo, Grégory Alcan, Julien Chaninet	France	21.450
Bronze medal	Maxim Ozertsov, Roman Tymko, Stanislav Kuzin, Mikhail Nazariev, Dmitry Ekimenko, Danila Shohin	Russia	20.800
4	Petru Porime Tolan, Nadina Hotca, Cristina Antonescu, Tudorel-Valentin Mavrodineanu, Ferdinand Raileanu, Cristina Simona Nedelcu	Romania	20.650
5	Shou Minchao, Wang Jun Wei, Che Lei, Liu Chao, Hu X In, Wang Pei	China	20.450
6	Manuela Mancini, Luca Fancello, Sergio Bellantonio, Antonio Caforio, Ylenia Giugno, Lisa Milani	Italy	20.100
7	Mélanie Salvoch, Aurélie Joly, Mathie Deliersu, Nicolas Garavel, Benjamin Garavel, Emilie Biancherin	France	19.950
8	Alena Kurskaya, Evgenia Kudymova, Yulia Yakovleva, Eugenia Anisimova, Anastasia Akhmadieva, Egor Stanovkin	Russia	19.900

=== Medal table ===
Rank	Nation	Gold	Silver	Bronze	Total
1	Romania	1	2	1	4
2	France	1	2	0	3
3	China	1	1	1	3
4	Brazil	1	0	1	2
5	Spain	1	0	0	1
6	New Zealand	0	0	1	1
6	Russia	0	0	1	1
Totals (7 entries)		5	5	5	15
