= Mircea Brînzea =

Romanian aerobic gymnast

- Born: 25 January 1986 (age 40) Bucharest

Gymnastics career
- Discipline: Aerobic gymnastics
- Country represented: Romania
- Club: CSS 1 Farul Constanta
- Head coach: Maria Fumea
- Assistant coach: Claudiu Varlam
- Former coach: Velea Victor
- Retired: 2010 - 2012
Medal record
Aerobic Gymnastics World Championships
Gold medal – first place	2008 Ulm	Trio
Gold medal – first place	2008 Ulm	Team
Silver medal – second place	2008 Ulm	Mixed Pair
Gold medal – first place	2006 Nanjing	Trio
Silver medal – second place	2006 Nanjing	Team
Gold medal – first place	2012 Sofia	Team
Bronze medal – third place	2012 Sofia	Groups
Bronze medal – third place	2012 Sofia	Trio
Bronze medal – third place	2012 Sofia	Individual
Aerobic Gymnastics World Games
Gold medal – first place	2009 Kaohsiung	Trio
Aerobic Gymnastics European Championships
Gold medal – first place	2009 Liberec	Groups
Gold medal – first place	2009 Liberec	Trio
Gold medal – first place	2007 Szombathely	Trio
Gold medal – first place	2005 Coimbra	Trio
Silver medal – second place	2009 Liberec	Mixed Pair
Silver medal – second place	2007 Szombathely	Mixed Pair
Bronze medal – third place	2005 Coimbra	Mixed Pair
Aerobic Gymnastics World Cup
Silver medal – second place	2012 Tokio	Individual
Aerobic Gymnastics Open Cup
Aerobic Gymnastics Balkan

Mircea Brînzea (born 25 January 1986 in Bucharest, Romania) is a Romanian aerobic gymnast. He won three world championships medals (two gold and one silver) and seven European medals (four gold, two silver and one bronze).
