= Cristina Nedelcu =

Romanian aerobic gymnast

- Full name: Cristina Simona Nedelcu
- Born: 28 February 1987 (age 39) Bucharest
- Height: 165 cm (5 ft 5 in)

Gymnastics career
- Discipline: Aerobic gymnastics
- Country represented: Romania
- Club: Farul Constanţa
- Head coach: Maria Fumea
- Assistant coach: Claudiu Varlam
- Retired: 2010
Medal record
Aerobic Gymnastics World Championships
Gold medal – first place	2010 Rodez	Team
Gold medal – first place	2008 Ulm	Team
Gold medal – first place	2006 Nanjing	Team
Silver medal – second place	2008 Ulm	Individual
Bronze medal – third place	2010 Rodez	Mixed Pair
Bronze medal – third place	2008 Ulm	Mixed Pair
Bronze medal – third place	2006 Nanjing	Trio
Aerobic Gymnastics European Championships
Gold medal – first place	2009 Liberec	Mixed Pair
Gold medal – first place	2005 Coimbra	Groups
Bronze medal – third place	2007 Szombathely	Groups
Bronze medal – third place	2005 Coimbra	Trio

Cristina Simona Nedelcu (born 28 February 1987 in Bucharest, Romania) is a Romanian aerobic gymnast who won the silver medal in the women's individual event at the 2008 Aerobic Gymnastics World Championships in Ulm. During her career she won four world championships medals (one silver and three gold), four European championships medals (two gold and two bronze) and six times national women's individual champion .
