= Valentin Mavrodineanu =

Romanian aerobic gymnast

- Full name: Tudorel-Valentin Mavrodineanu
- Born: 3 July 1986 (age 40) Bucharest

Gymnastics career
- Discipline: Aerobic gymnastics
- Country represented: Romania
- Club: CSS 1 Farul Constanta
- Head coach: Maria Fumea
- Assistant coach: Claudiu Varlam
Medal record
World Championships
Gold medal – first place	2012 Sofia	Mixed Pair
Gold medal – first place	2010 Rodez	Groups
Gold medal – first place	2008 Ulm	Trio
Gold medal – first place	2006 Nanjing	Trio
Gold medal – first place	2006 Nanjing	Mixed Pair
Silver medal – second place	2010 Rodez	Trio
Bronze medal – third place	2012 Sofia	Trio
Bronze medal – third place	2012 Sofia	Groups
Bronze medal – third place	2010 Rodez	Mixed Pair
Bronze medal – third place	2008 Ulm	Mixed Pair
European Championships
Gold medal – first place	2011 Bucharest	Trio
Gold medal – first place	2009 Liberec	Groups
Gold medal – first place	2009 Liberec	Trio
Gold medal – first place	2009 Liberec	Mixed Pairs
Gold medal – first place	2007 Szombathely	Trio
Gold medal – first place	2005 Coimbra	Mixed Pairs
Bronze medal – third place	2007 Szombathely	Groups
Universiade
Silver medal – second place	2011 Shenzhen	Aero Dance

Tudorel-Valentin Mavrodineanu (born 3 July 1986 in Bucharest, Romania) is a Romanian aerobic gymnast. He won seven world championships medals (four gold, one silver, and two bronze) and seven European medals (six gold and one bronze).
