= Cristina Antonescu =

Romanian aerobic gymnast

- Born: 27 September 1986 (age 39) Bucharest

Gymnastics career
- Discipline: Aerobic gymnastics
- Country represented: Romania
- Club: CSS 1 Farul Constanta
- Head coach: Maria Fumea
- Assistant coach: Claudiu Varlam
Medal record
Aerobic Gymnastics World Championships
Gold medal – first place	2006 Nanjing	Team
Gold medal – first place	2008 Ulm	Team
Silver medal – second place	2008 Ulm	Mixed Pair
European Championships
Gold medal – first place	2005 Coimbra	Groups
Silver medal – second place	2009 Liberec	Mixed Pairs
Silver medal – second place	2007 Szombathely	Mixed Pairs
Bronze medal – third place	2007 Szombathely	Groups
Bronze medal – third place	2005 Coimbra	Mixed Pairs

Cristina Antonescu (born 27 September 1986 in Bucharest, Romania) is a Romanian aerobic gymnast. She won two gold medals world championship with the team, one silver world championships medals and five European championships medals (one gold, two silver and two bronze).
