= 2012 Aerobic Gymnastics World Championships =

12th Aerobic Gymnastics World Championships
- Venue: Arena Armeets
- Location: Sofia, Bulgaria
- Dates: 1–3 June

The 12th Aerobic Gymnastics World Championships were held in Sofia, Bulgaria 1 to 3 June 2012. It was held in conjunction with the 2012 Aerobic Gymnastics World Age Group Competitions, which finished on 31 May.

It was the second time the World Championships had been hosted in Sofia after the 2004 World Championships, and it was also the first time that the step aerobics and dance aerobics events were held at the World Championships. There were a total of 323 competitors from 37 countries.

Romania won the most medals overall (7), while China won the most gold medals (4). The individual women's event was won by Sara Moreno. In the individual men's event, Iván Parejo, who had won the title previously at the 2008 World Championships, regained his title, and Mircea Zamfir won silver for a second consecutive year.

There were several ties in the results. The previous year's champions in the mixed pairs event, Moreno and Vincente Lli from Spain, won a second consecutive World title, Moreno's second medal of the event; they tied with Andreea Bogati and Tudorel-Valentin Mavrodineanu from Romania. In the trio event, gold was shared between the Chinese trio and the South Korean trio; with the exception of the Vietnamese team, all eight teams in the Trios final were made up of all men. The first Aerobic Steps title was shared by the Chinese and Russian groups, while the Mongolian team in the bronze position, consisting of students from the Mongolian University of Science and Technology, won their country's first World medal. The first Aerobic Dance final was also won by the Chinese group, as was the Group final.

The closing ceremony featured a performance by Valya Balkanska as well as by local rhythmic and acrobatic gymnasts.

== Results ==
=== Women's Individual ===
Rank	Gymnast	Country	Score
Gold medal	Sara Moreno	Spain	21.650
Silver medal	Aurelie Joly	France	21.350
Bronze medal	Lubov Gazov	Austria	21.250
4	Oana Corina Constantin	Romania	21.150
5	Giulia Bianchi	Italy	20.850
6	Denitsa Parichkova	Bulgaria	20.800
6	Hyun Kung Shin	South Korea	20.800
8	Maria Luisa Pavel	Romania	20.700

=== Men's Individual ===
Rank	Gymnast	Country	Score
Gold medal	Ivan Parejo	Spain	22.200
Silver medal	Mircea Zamfir	Romania	21.650
Bronze medal	Liangfa Li	China	21.600
Bronze medal	Mircea Brinzea	Romania	21.600
5	Maxime Decker-Breitel	France	21.300
6	Emanuele Pagliuca	Italy	20.800
7	Benjamin Garavel	France	20.750
8	Vicente Lli Llorris	Spain	20.450

=== Mixed Pairs ===
Rank	Gymnasts	Country	Score
Gold medal	Sara Moreno, Vincente Lli	Spain	21.650
Gold medal	Andreea Bogati, Tudorel-Valentin Mavrodineanu	Romania	21.650
Bronze medal	Evgeniia Kudymova, Maksim Grinin	Russia	21.550
4	Guang Yang, Chao Ma	China	21.450
5	Aleksei Germanov, Polina Amosenok	Russia	21.000
6	Julien Chaninet, Aurelie Joly	France	20.950
7	Vũ Bá Đông, Trần Thị Thu Hà	Vietnam	20.850
8	Changil Yoon, Hyun Kyung Shin	South Korea	19.800

=== Trios ===
Rank	Gymnasts	Country	Score
Gold medal	Le Tao, Lei Che, Mingzhe Han	China	22.300
Gold medal	Guontaeck Kim, Kyung Ho Lee, Jusun Ryu	South Korea	22.300
Bronze medal	Tudorel-Valentin Mavrodineanu, Mircea Brinzea, Mircea Zamfir	Romania	22.100
4	Liangfa Li, Tianbo Liu, Zizhuo Wang	China	21.800
5	Vũ Bá Đông, Tien Phuong Nguyen, Trần Thị Thu Hà	Vietnam	21.150
6	Alexander Kondratichev, Igor Trushkov, Kirill Lobanznyuk	Russia	21.050
7	Osvaldo Solis Martinez, Josefath Ivan Veloz Velazquez, Juan Jose Quiroz Hernandez	Mexico	20.400
8	Simone Bonatti, Davide Donati, Antonio Caforio	Italy	20.350

=== Groups ===
Rank	Gymnast	Country	Score
Gold medal	Liangfa Li, Tianbo Liu, Zizhuo Wang, Le Tao, Lei Che, Mingzhe Han	China	22.200
Silver medal	Mathieu Deliers, David Orta, Maxime Dekher-Breitel, Benjamin Garavel, Nicolas Garavel, Jonathan Gajdane	France	21.750
Bronze medal	Marius Gavriloaie, Mircea Zamfir, Mircea Brinzea, Tudorel-Valentin Mavrodineanu, Petru Porime Tolan, Florin Nebunu	Romania	21.700
4	Alexander Kondratichev, Igor Trushkov, Kirill Lobaznyuk, Garsevan Dzhanazyan, Valeriy Gusev, Danil Chayun	Russia	21.200
5	Maria Bianca Becze, Maria Luisa Pavel, Anca Claudia Surdu, Andreea Bogati, Oana Corina Constantin, Laura Andreea Cristache	Romania	21.105
6	Denis Soloviev, Evgeniia Kudymova, Denis Shurupov, Dmitriy Safonov, Alexei Germanov, Andrey Zhivin	Russia	20.634
7	Reza Farokhian, Alireza Farrokh, Amin Arbabkazemzadeh, Mohammad Sakkaki, Habib Ebadi, Mostafa Mousavi	Iran	20.450
8	Sungkyu Song, Kyung Ho Lee, Jusun Ryu, Inchan Hwang, Sunghwa Lee, Jae Youn Go	South Korea	20.000

=== Dance ===
Rank	Gymnast	Country	Score
Gold medal	Le Tao, Lei Che, Zhi Li, Jinxuan Huang, Qin Zou, Minchao Shou, Bangda Hu, Mingzhe Han	China	19.513
Silver medal	Maria Bianca Becze, Lucian Fratiloiu, Maria Luisa Pavel, Anca Claudia Surdu, Laura Andreea Cristache, Marius Ciprian Petruse, Petru Porime Tolan, Florin Nebunu	Romania	19.213
Bronze medal	Dorian Alimelie, Jonathan Gajdane, Chrystel Lejeune, Aurelie Joly, Jacques Hugot, Eugenie Raphael, Marion Roger, Laure Valdivia	France	19.013
4	Kyung Ho Lee, Eungsoo Kim, Jaehyun Han, Guontaeck Kim, Incham Hwang, Sunghwa Lee, Changil Yoon, Taehee Yun	South Korea	18.900
5	Andrey Zhivin, Maxim Grinin, Polina Polyanskikh, Oxana Trukhacheva, Irina Klopova, Veronika Korneva, Valeriy Gusev, Danil Chayun	Russia	18.688
6	Simone Bonatti, Davide Donati, Antonio Caforio, Alessandra Volpe, Cinzia Galletti, Maria Chiara Albergati, Gaia Brambilla, Erika Corio	Italy	18.663
7	Anett Bako, Agota Szorenyi, Reka Lendvay, Alexandra Hagymasi, Dora Lendvay, Evelin Rozsa, Orsolya Kun, Rosza Sipeki	Hungary	18.613
8	Chelsea Carroll, Samantha Elkington, Zoe Tisdale, Samantha Kukura, Susan Price, Emma Davies, Catriona Cowden, Sarah Millar	Australia	17.053

=== Step ===
Rank	Gymnast	Country	Score
Gold medal	Zhi Li, Yuhan Wang, Jinxuan Huang, Qin Zou, Minchao Shou, Bangda Hu, Junqiang Wu, Ye Ma	China	17.800
Gold medal	Evgeniia Kudymova, Denis Shurupov, Dmitriy Safonov, Alexey Germanov, Polina Polyanskikh, Irina Klopova, Veronika Korneva, Danil Chayun	Russia	17.800
Bronze medal	Galbadrakh Enkhbayar, Enkhpurev Altangerel, Ariunbold Sainbayar, Altan Ochir Narmandakh, Sergelen Narmandakh, Batgerel Batsaikhan, Munkhtogoo Amarjargal, Galmandakh Yadamjav	Mongolia	17.700
4	Mathieu Deliers, Nicolas Garavel, Jonathan Gajdane, Jacques Hugot, Eugenie Raphael, Marion Roger, Laure Valdivia, Gavin Jourdan	France	17.650
5	Hyung Kyung Shin, Mi Hyu Shim, Yeon Sun Park, Minji Ryu, Youra Lee, Yun Ji Noh, Eunji Kim, Eunbi Lee	South Korea	17.400
6	David Belio Rodriguez, Ines Belsue, Ines Lasarte, Berta Izaguerri Artiaga, Violeta Monge Moreno, Maria Gonzalez Romero, Isaac Lozano Echevarria, Lucia Del Barco Gonzalez	Spain	17.300
7	Ramona Kovacs, Anita Taskai, Julia Szabo, Kinga Szinder, Evelin Czako, Cecilia Ujvari, Anita Hosnyanski, Kitti Korosi	Hungary	17.100
8	Kateryna Shelest, Viktoriya Gubenko, Kateryna Stokolos, Alina Chmykhal, Kateryna Ivanova, Olga Lukynova, Kateryna Shekhovtsova, Olena Teptina	Ukraine	16.950

=== Team ===
Rank	Country	Points
Gold medal	Romania	17
Silver medal	France	18
Bronze medal	China	20
4	South Korea	22
5	Russia	30
6	Hungary	55
7	Argentina	63
8	Ukraine	93
9	Venezuela	98
10	India	116

== Medal table ==
Rank	Nation	Gold	Silver	Bronze	Total
1	China	4	0	2	6
2	Spain	3	0	0	3
3	Romania	2	2	3	7
4	Russia	1	0	1	2
5	South Korea	1	0	0	1
6	France	0	3	1	4
7	Austria	0	0	1	1
7	Mongolia	0	0	1	1
Totals (8 entries)		11	5	9	25
