= 2009 Aerobic Gymnastics European Championships =

The 6th Aerobic Gymnastics European Championships was held in Liberec, Czech Republic in November 2009.

== Results ==
=== Women's Individual ===
Rank	Gymnast	Country	Point
Gold medal	Giulia Bianchi	Italy	20.300
Silver medal	Sara Moreno	Spain	20.150
Bronze medal	Aurélie Joly	France	19.850
4	Oana Corina Constantin	Romania	19.650
5	Cristina Nedelcu	Romania	19.600
6	Denitsa Parichkova	Bulgaria	19.600
7	Liolia Kerogli	Greece	19.500
8.	Manuela Mancini	Italy	19.200

=== Men’s Individual ===
Rank	Gymnast	Country	Point
Gold medal	Ivan Parejo	Spain	21.350
Silver medal	Alexander Kondratichev	Russia	20.800
Bronze medal	Mircea Zamfir	Romania	20.500
4	Morgan Jaquemin	France	20.300
5	Emanuele Pagliuca	Italy	20.300
6	Zsolt Roik	Hungary	20.200
7	Rámon Tyeklár	Hungary	19.850
8	Antonio Caforio	Italy	19.300

=== Mixed pair ===
Rank	Gymnast	Country	Point
Gold medal	Cristina Nedelcu, Tudorel Valentin Mavrodineanu	Romania	20.650
Silver medal	Cristina Antonescu, Mircea Brînzea	Romania	20.350
Bronze medal	Aurélie Joly, Julien Chaninet	France	20.300
4	Sara Moreno, Vicente Lli	Spain	19.900
5	Dóra Lendvay, Zsolt Roik	Hungary	19.300
6	Ekaterina Cherepanova, Viacheslav Ekaterina	Russia	19.150
7	Elena Rosca, Tiago Faquinha	Portugal	19.100
8	Evgenia Anisimova, Danila Shokin	Russia	18.750

=== Trio ===
Rank	Gymnast	Country	Point
Gold medal	Tudorel Valentin Mavrodineanu, Mircea Zamfir, Mircea Brînzea	Romania	21.150
Silver medal	Benjamin Garavel, Nicolas Garavel, Morgan Jacquemin	France	21.100
Bronze medal	Cosmin Muj, Petru Porime Tolan, Florin Nebunu	Romania	19.950
4	Emanuele Pagliuca, Iaia Vito, Antonio Caforio	Italy	19.750
5	Dorian Alimelie, Mathieu Deliers, David Orta	France	19.550
6	Alexander Kondratichev, Anton Shishigin, Arseniy Tikhomirov	Russia	19.450
7	Anett Bakó, Dorina Nagy, Agota Szörenyi	Hungary	19.265
8	Rámon Tyeklár, Richárd Tyeklár, Ferenc Székely	Hungary	18.000

=== Groups ===
Rank	Gymnast	Country	Point
Gold medal	Tudorel Valentin Mavrodineanu, Mircea Zamfir, Mircea Brînzea, Petru Porime Tolan, Florin Nebunu, Ferdinand Raileanu	Romania	20.850
Silver medal	Julien Chaninet, Mathieu Deliers, Benjamin Garavel, Nicolas Garavel, Morgan Jacquemin, Gaylord Oubrier	France	20.450
Bronze medal	Alexander Kondratichev, Anton Shishigin, Arseniy Tikhomirov, Igor Tryshkov, Kiril Lobaznyuk l, Mikhil Nazarev	Russia	20.250
4	Nadina Ionela Hotca, Laura Cristache, Cristina Nedelcu, Anca Surdu, Cristina Antonescu, Oana Corina Constantin	Romania	19.973
5	Caforio Antonio, Pagliuca Emanuele, Fancello Luca, Mancini Manuela, Pugliese Manuela, Giugno Ylenia	Italy	19.715
6	Liolia Kerogli, Carla-Cristina Radulescu, Pagona Kiousi, Maria Koltsida, Dimitra Skoura, Christina Ioannidou	Greece	19.360
7	Ivan Parejo, Antonio Ivan, Alexandra Torres, Begona Combarro, Estela Barbera, Arancha Martinez	Spain	19.260
8	Anett Bakó, Dóra Hegyi, Noémi Kökényesi, Dorina Nagy, Emese Szaloki, Agota Szörenyi	Hungary	18.944

=== Medal table ===
Rank	Nation	Gold	Silver	Bronze	Total
1	Romania	3	1	2	6
2	Spain	1	1	0	2
3	Italy	1	0	0	1
4	France	0	3	1	4
5	Russia	0	1	1	2
Totals (5 entries)		5	6	4	15
