= 2011 Aerobic Gymnastics European Championships =

Championships held in Bucharest in November 2011

The 7th Aerobic Gymnastics European Championships was held in Bucharest, Romania from 9 to 13 November 2011.

== Results ==
=== Women's Individual ===
Rank	Gymnast	Country	Point
Gold medal	Oana Corina Constantin	Romania	21.50
Silver medal	Sara Moreno	Spain	20.800
Bronze medal	Maria Luisa Pavel	Romania	20.350
4	Lubov Gazov	Austria	20.250
5	Giulia Bianchi	Italy	20.000
6	Dora Hegyi	Hungary	19.800
7	Veronika Korneva	Russia	19.650
8.	Ekaterina Cherepanova	Russia	19.500

=== Men’s Individual ===
Rank	Gymnast	Country	Point
Gold medal	Ivan Parejo	Spain	21.850
Silver medal	Emanuele Pagliuca	Italy	20.850
Bronze medal	Alexander Kondratichev	Russia	20.850
4	Garsevan Dzhanazyan	Russia	20.500
5	Benjamin Garavel	France	20.150
6	Mihaita Iulian Cimpoi	Romania	19.950
7	Mircea Zamfir	Romania	19.875
8	Antonio Caforio	Italy	0.000

=== Mixed pair ===
Rank	Gymnast	Country	Point
Gold medal	Aurélie Joly, Julien Chaninet	France	21.500
Silver medal	Sara Moreno, Vicente Lli	Spain	21.450
Bronze medal	Evgeniya Kudymova, Maxim Grinin	Russia	21.100
4	Andreea Bogati, Tudorel Valentin Mavrodineanu	Romania	21.050
5	Giulia Bianchi, Emanuele Pagliuca	Italy	20.750
6	Polina Amosenok, Garsevan Dzhanazyan	Russia	20.750
7	Delia Lacataru, Mihaita Iulian Cimpoi	Romania	19.800
8	Rossella Vetrone, Antonio Lollo	Italy	19.350

=== Trio ===
Rank	Gymnast	Country	Point
Gold medal	Tudorel Valentin Mavrodineanu, Mircea Zamfir, Petru Porime Tolan	Romania	21.950
Silver medal	Kirill Lobazyuk, Alexander Kondratichev, Igor Trushkov	Russia	21.200
Bronze medal	Benjamin Garavel, Nicolas Garavel, Maxime Breteil Decker	France	21.150
4	Emanuele Pagliuca, Bonatti Simone, Antonio Caforio	Italy	20.600
5	Dorian Alimelie, Mathieu Deliers, David Orta	France	20.500
6	Irina Klopova, Veronika Korneva, Evgeniya Kudymova	Russia	21.178
7	Anett Bakó, Dorina Nagy, Agota Szörenyi	Hungary	18.947
8	Andrea Cvachova, Kristyna Bernatova, Monika Gerzova	Czech Republic	18.485

=== Groups ===
Rank	Gymnast	Country	Point
Gold medal	Alexander Kondratichev, Garsevan Dzhanazyan, Danil Chayun, Igor Trushkov, Kiril Lobaznyuk, Valerii Gusev	Russia	21.550
Silver medal	Maria Luisa Pavel, Laura Cristache, Delia Lacataru, Anca Surdu, Andreea Bogati, Oana Corina Constantin	Romania	20.794
Bronze medal	Polina Amosenok, Irina Klopova, Veronika Korneva, Evgeniya Kudymova, Anzhella Korotkova, Oxana Trukhacheva	Russia	20.439
4	Julien Chaninet, Mathieu Deliers, Benjamin Garavel, Nicolas Garavel, Maxime Breteil Decker, Jonathan Gajdane	France	20.350
5	Caforio Antonio, Pagliuca Emanuele, Simine Bonatti, Giulia Bianchi, Antonio Lollo, Luca Fancello	Italy	20.331
6	Liolia Kerogli, Carla-Cristina Radulescu, Pagona Kiousi, Isavella Krokou, Dimitra Skoura, Christina Ioannidou	Greece	19.671
7	Rebeka Holp, Anett Bakó, Dóra Hegyi, Linda Bucsanszki, Dora Lendvay, Agota Szörenyi	Hungary	19.202
8	Barbara Csirke, Attila Karocs, Ramona Kovacs, Anna Osztafin, Gergely Pancso, Virag Schneider	Hungary	16.950

=== Medal table ===
Rank	Nation	Gold	Silver	Bronze	Total
1	Romania	2	1	1	4
2	Spain	1	2	0	3
3	Russia	1	1	3	5
4	France	1	0	1	2
5	Italy	0	1	0	1
Totals (5 entries)		5	5	5	15
