= Romania at the 2011 Summer Universiade =

- IOC code: ROU

in Shenzhen
- Competitors: 60 in 9 sports
- Medals: Gold 3 Silver 4 Bronze 9 Total 16

Summer Universiade appearances
- 1959; 1961; 1963; 1965; 1967; 1970; 1973; 1975; 1977; 1979; 1981; 1983; 1985; 1987; 1989; 1991; 1993; 1995; 1997; 1999; 2001; 2003; 2005; 2007; 2009; 2011; 2013; 2015; 2017; 2019; 2021; 2025; 2027

Romania competed at the 2011 Summer Universiade in Shenzhen, China.

== Medalists ==
| Medal | Name | Sport | Event |
|---|---|---|---|
| Gold | Flavius Koczi | Artistic Gymnastics | Floor |
| Gold | Flavius Koczi | Artistic Gymnastics | Vault |
| Gold | Romania | Aerobic Gymnastics | Team Ranking |
| Silver | Bianca Pascu | Fencing | Individual sabre |
| Silver | Norbert Trandafir | Swimming | 100 m freestyle |
| Silver | Marius Berbecar | Artistic Gymnastics | Parallel bars |
| Silver | Andreea Bogati; Laura Andreea Cristache; Tudorel Valentin Mavrodineanu; Petru Tolan Porime; Anca Claudia Surdu; Mircea Zamfir | Aerobic gymnastics | Aerobic Dance |
| Bronze | Bianca Perie | Athletics | Hammer |
| Bronze | Valentin Radu | Judo | 90 kg |
| Bronze | Cristian Bățagă; Marius Berbecar; Ovidiu Buidoso; Vlad Cotuna; Flavius Koczi | Artistic Gymnastics | Team all-around |
| Bronze | Violeta Dumitru | Judo | 48 kg |
| Bronze | Flavius Koczi | Artistic Gymnastics | Pommel horse |
| Bronze | Ioana Ghemes; Elisabeta Samara; Anamaria Sebe | Table tennis | Women's team |
| Bronze | Cristina Ioana Bujin | Athletics | Women's triple jump |
| Bronze | Tudorel Valentin Mavrodineanu; Petru Tolan Porime; Mircea Zamfir | Aerobic Gymnastics | Trios |
| Bronze | Andreea Bogati; Laura Andreea Cristache; Petru Tolan Porime; Anca Claudia Surdu; Mircea Zamfir | Aerobic Gymnastics | Groups |

== Athletics ==
=== Men ===
| Event | Athletes | Qualifying | | Semifinal | | Final | |
| Event | Athletes | Result | Rank | Result | Rank | Result | Rank |
|---|---|---|---|---|---|---|---|
| 400 m hurdles | Attila Nagy | 52.42 | 27 | Did not advance | | | |
| 3000 m steplechase | Alexandru Ghinea | 9:00.78 | 13 | | | Did not advance | |
| High Jump | Mihai Donisan | 2.15 | 14 | | | Did not advance | |
| Discus | Mihai Liviu Grasu | 56.61 | 12 q | | | 56.28 | 12 |

=== Women ===
| Event | Athletes | Qualifying 1 | | Qualifying 2 | | Semifinal | | Final | |
| Event | Athletes | Result | Rank | Result | Rank | Result | Rank | Result | Rank |
|---|---|---|---|---|---|---|---|---|---|
| 100 m | Andreea Ogrăzeanu | 11.80 | 14 Q | 11.74 | 13 q | 11.61 | 9 Q | 11.49 | 6 |
| 200 m | Andreea Ogrăzeanu | 24.86 | 30 Q | 25.62 | 31 | Did not advance | | | |
| 5000 m | Roxana Elisabeta Birca | 16:06.44 | 3 Q | | | | | 16:11.94 | 8 |
| Half Marathon | Cristina Alexandra Frumuz | | | | | | | 1:22:57 | 14 |
| Long Jump | Cornelia Deiac | 6.29 | 7 Q | | | | | 6.45 | 4 |
| Hammer | Bianca Florentina Perie | 65.38 | 9 Q | | | | | 71.18 | Bronze |
| Triple Jump | Carmen Cristina Toma | 13.36 | 12 q | | | | | 13.82 | 7 |
| Triple Jump | Cristina Ioana Bujin | 14.30 | 1 Q | | | | | 14.21 | Bronze |
| Javelin | Maria Nicoleta Negoiţă | | | | | | | 53.55 | 7 |

== Basketball ==
Romania has qualified a men's team.

== Fencing ==
=== Men ===
| Athlete | Event | Round of 128 | Round of 64 | Round of 32 | Round of 16 | Quarterfinals | Semifinals | Bronze Medal Final | Rank |
| Athlete | Event | Opposition Score | Opposition Score | Opposition Score | Opposition Score | Opposition Score | Opposition Score | Opposition Score | Rank |
|---|---|---|---|---|---|---|---|---|---|
| Adrian Pop | Individual épée | Bye | (Switzerland) Fabian Kauter; L 11-15 | Did not advance | | | | | 56 |

=== Women ===
| Athlete | Event | Round of 64 | Round of 32 | Round of 16 | Quarterfinals | Semifinals | Bronze Medal Final | Rank |
| Athlete | Event | Opposition Score | Opposition Score | Opposition Score | Opposition Score | Opposition Score | Opposition Score | Rank |
|---|---|---|---|---|---|---|---|---|
| Bianca Pascu | Individual sabre | Bye | (Italy) Loretta Gulotta; W 15-13 | (Japan) Maho Hamda; W 15-10 | (China) Li Fei; W 15-11 | (Hong Kong) Au Yeung Wai Sum; W 15-12 | (Ukraine) Olha Kharlan; L 9-15 | Silver |
| Mihaela Bulică | Individual sabre | Bye | (Italy) Livia Stagni; W 15-11 | (Italy) Rossella Gregorio; W 15-4 | (Hong Kong) Au Yeung Wai Sum; L 13-15 | Did not advance | | 7 |
| Elena Munteanu | Individual sabre | Bye | (Hong Kong) Ho Siu In Jenny; W 15-13 | (Ukraine) Olena Khomrova; L 12-15 | Did not advance | | | 14 |
| Simona Deac | Individual Épée | Bye | (Italy) Marzia Muroni; W 15-6 | (Ukraine) Olena Kryvytska; L 8-15 | Did not advance | | | 10 |

== Judo ==
=== Men ===
| Athlete | Event | Round of 32 | Round of 16 | Quarterfinals | Semifinals | Repechage Round 1 | Repechage Round 2 | Final of Repechage | Bronze Medal Contest | Final | |
| Athlete | Event | Opposition Result | Opposition Result | Opposition Result | Opposition Result | Opposition Result | Opposition Result | Opposition Result | Opposition Result | Opposition Result | Rank |
|---|---|---|---|---|---|---|---|---|---|---|---|
| Valentin Radu | 90 kg | Bye | (Azerbaijan) Ramin Gurbanov; W 013-001 | (France) Alexandre Iddir; W 102-001 | (Uzbekistan) Sherali Juraev; L 001-000 | Bye | | | (Poland) Lukasz Kolesnik; W 011-001 | Did not advance | Bronze |

=== Women ===
| Athlete | Event | Round of 32 | Round of 16 | Quarterfinals | Semifinals | Repechage Round 1 | Repechage Round 2 | Final of Repechage | Bronze Medal Contest | Final | |
| Athlete | Event | Opposition Result | Opposition Result | Opposition Result | Opposition Result | Opposition Result | Opposition Result | Opposition Result | Opposition Result | Opposition Result | Rank |
|---|---|---|---|---|---|---|---|---|---|---|---|
| Violeta Dumitru | 48 kg | Bye | (Kazakhstan) Elmira Seifulgazina; W 100-000 | (Germany) Kai Yvonne Kraus; W 001-000 | (Russia) Kristina Rumyantseva; L 100-000 | Bye | | | (North Korea) Cha Ok Song; W 001-000 | Did not advance | Bronze |
| Angela Mara | 63 kg | (Canada) Stéfanie Tremblay; W 100-000 | (Chinese Taipei) Chang Yajau; L 001-000 | Did not advance | | | | | | | |

== Swimming ==
=== Men ===
| Athlete | Events | Heat | | Final | |
| Athlete | Events | Time | Rank | Time | Rank |
|---|---|---|---|---|---|
| Alexandru Coci | Men's 50 m butterfly | 25.27 | 28 | Did not advance | |
| Alexandru Coci | Men's 100 m butterfly | 53.71 | 11 | Did not advance | |
| Alexandru Coci | Men's 200 m butterfly | 1:59.03 | 11 | Did not advance | |
| Bogdan Andrei Uricheanu | Men's 200 m individual medley | 2:06.09 | 21 | Did not advance | |
| Bogdan Andrei Uricheanu | Men's 400 m individual medley | 4:39.51 | 27 | Did not advance | |
| Bogdan Andrei Uricheanu | Men's 200 m breaststroke | 2:23.97 | 27 | Did not advance | |
| Bogdan Andrei Uricheanu | Men's 800 m free | | | 8:33.95 | 24 |
| Constantin Cosmin Petcu | Men's 50 m freestyle | 25.12 | 45 | Did not advance | |
| Constantin Cosmin Petcu | Men's 50 m backstroke | 28.03 | 34 | Did not advance | |
| Constantin Cosmin Petcu | Men's 100 m backstroke | 1:00.43 | 38 | Did not advance | |
| Constantin Cosmin Petcu | Men's 200 m backstroke | 2:13.77 | 30 | Did not advance | |
| Norbert Trandafir | Men's 50 m butterfly | 25.29 | 31 | Did not advance | |
| Norbert Trandafir | Men's 50 m free | 22.81 | 6 | | |
| Norbert Trandafir | Men's 100 m free | 49.67 | 4 | 49.41 | Silver |
| Norbert Trandafir | Men's 200 m free | 1:50.87 | 14 | Did not advance | |
| Catalin Cosma | Men's 200 m free | 1:55.03 | 30 | Did not advance | |
| Catalin Cosma | Men's 400 m freestyle | 3:58.41 | 17 | Did not advance | |
| Catalin Cosma | Men's 800 m freestyle | | | 8:12.22 | 17 |
| Norbert Trandafir; Alexandru Coci; Catalin Cosma; Bogdan Andrei Uricheanu | Men's 4 × 100 metre freestyle | 3:29.50 | 15 | Did not advance | |
| Catalin Cosma; Bogdan Andrei Uricheanu; Alexandru Coci; Norbert Trandafir | Men's 4 × 200 metre freestyle | 7:40.52 | 10 | Did not advance | |

=== Women ===
| Athlete | Events | Heat | | Final | |
| Athlete | Events | Time | Rank | Time | Rank |
|---|---|---|---|---|---|
| Ionela Cozma | Women's 50 m butterfly | 28.89 | 31 | Did not advance | |
| Ionela Cozma | Women's 400 m free | 4:22.27 | 18 | Did not advance | |
| Ionela Cozma | Women's 1500 m freestyle | | | 16:59.19 | 13 |

== Table tennis ==
=== Women ===
Team

| Athlete | Event | Round Robin (Group C) | | | | Round of 16 | Quarterfinals | Semifinals | Final | Rank |
| Athlete | Event | Match 1 | Match 2 | Match 3 | Match 4 | Round of 16 | Quarterfinals | Semifinals | Final | Rank |
| Athlete | Event | Opposition Result | Opposition Result | Opposition Result | Opposition Result | Opposition Result | Opposition Result | Opposition Result | Opposition Result | Rank |
|---|---|---|---|---|---|---|---|---|---|---|
| Ioana Ghemes; Elisabeta Samara; Anamaria Sebe | Team | Macau; W 3–0 | Sri Lanka; W 3–0 | Japan; L 2–3 | Ukraine; W 3–1 | United States; W 3–0 | South Korea; W 3–1 | China; L 0-3 | Did not advance | Bronze |

Singles

| Athlete | Event | Round Robin | | Round of 64 | Round of 32 | Round of 16 | Quarterfinals | Semifinals | Final | Rank |
| Athlete | Event | Match 1 | Match 2 | Round of 64 | Round of 32 | Round of 16 | Quarterfinals | Semifinals | Final | Rank |
| Athlete | Event | Opposition Result | Opposition Result | Opposition Result | Opposition Result | Opposition Result | Opposition Result | Opposition Result | Opposition Result | Rank |
|---|---|---|---|---|---|---|---|---|---|---|
| Ioana Ghemes | Singles | (Lebanon) Christy Jalekian; W 3-0 | (Macau) Ng Kai; W 3-0 | (South Korea) Jee Min Hyung; L 0-4 | Did not advance | | | | | |
| Anamaria Sebe | Singles | (Thailand) Usanee Taveesat; W 3-2 | (Lebanon) Tala Haouili; W 3-0 | (Macau) Cheong Chengi; W 4-0 | (China) Fan Ying; L 0-4 | Did not advance | | | | |
| Elisabeta Samara | Singles | Bye | | (Thailand) Usanee Taveesat; W 4-0 | (Japan) Marina Matsuzawa; W 4-3 | (Chinese Taipei) Cheng Iching; L 3-4 | Did not advance | | | |

Doubles

| Athlete | Event | Round of 64 | Round of 32 | Round of 16 | Quarterfinals | Semifinals | Final | Rank |
| Athlete | Event | Opposition Result | Opposition Result | Opposition Result | Opposition Result | Opposition Result | Opposition Result | Rank |
|---|---|---|---|---|---|---|---|---|
| Elisabeta Samara; Ioana Ghemes | Doubles | Bye | (Botswana) Salome Tshegofatso Matlhatsi; Phemelo Gaborapelwe; W 3-0 | (Czech Republic) Martina Smistikova; Hana Matelová; W 3-0 | (South Korea) Jee Min Hyung; Moon Mi Ra; L 2-4 | Did not advance | | |

=== Men ===
Singles

| Athlete | Event | Round Robin | | Round of 64 | Round of 32 | Round of 16 | Quarterfinals | Semifinals | Final | Rank |
| Athlete | Event | Match 1 | Match 2 | Round of 64 | Round of 32 | Round of 16 | Quarterfinals | Semifinals | Final | Rank |
| Athlete | Event | Opposition Result | Opposition Result | Opposition Result | Opposition Result | Opposition Result | Opposition Result | Opposition Result | Opposition Result | Rank |
|---|---|---|---|---|---|---|---|---|---|---|
| Ovidiu George Ionescu | Singles | (Sri Lanka) DC Sooriyaarachchi; W 3-0 | (Portugal) Victor Efimov; W 3-1 | (Germany) Hermann Muehlbach; W 4-2 | (China) Yan An; L 1-4 | Did not advance | | | | |
| Alexandru Petrescu | Singles | (Zambia) Nelson Sinkala; W 3-0 | (New Zealand) Myles Collins; W 3-0 | (Thailand) Nikom Wongsiri; W 4-0 | (Japan) Kenji Matsudaira; L 1-4 | Did not advance | | | | |

Doubles

| Athlete | Event | Round of 64 | Round of 32 | Round of 16 | Quarterfinals | Semifinals | Final | Rank |
| Athlete | Event | Opposition Result | Opposition Result | Opposition Result | Opposition Result | Opposition Result | Opposition Result | Rank |
|---|---|---|---|---|---|---|---|---|
| Ovidiu George Ionescu; Alexandru Petrescu | Doubles | Bye | (Germany) Alexander Flemming; Lennart Boris Wehking; L 1-3 | Did not advance | | | | |

=== Mixed doubles ===
| Athlete | Event | Round of 64 | Round of 32 | Round of 16 | Quarterfinals | Semifinals | Final | Rank |
| Athlete | Event | Opposition Result | Opposition Result | Opposition Result | Opposition Result | Opposition Result | Opposition Result | Rank |
|---|---|---|---|---|---|---|---|---|
| Alexandru Petrescu; Anamaria Sebe | Mixed doubles | Bye | (Macau) Lo Chiman; Cheong Chengi; W 3-0 | (Spain) Juan Morego Valls Jove; Sara Ramirez Bermudez; L 0-3 | Did not advance | | | |
| Ovidiu George Ionescu; Elisabeta Samara | Mixed doubles | Bye | (Spain) Pere Navarro Galvez; Nadina Riera Codinachs; W 3-0 | (Chinese Taipei) Chen Chienan; Cheng Iching; L 0-3 | Did not advance | | | |

== Weightlifting ==
=== Men ===
| Athlete | Event | Snatch | Clean & Jerk | Total | Rank |
| Athlete | Event | Result | Result | Total | Rank |
|---|---|---|---|---|---|
| Gabriel Olaru | 56 kg | 103 | 130 | 233 | 5 |
| Slviu Berbec | 56 kg | 90 | 113 | 203 | 9 |
| Istvan Dioszegi | 94 kg | 155 | 180 | 335 | 13 |
