= Raluca Băbăligea =

Romanian gymnast (born 1984)

Raluca Babaligea
- Full name: Raluca Elena Babaligea
- Born: 5 April 1984 (age 42) Bucharest

Gymnastics career
- Discipline: Aerobic gymnastics
- Country represented: Romania
- Club: Triumf Bucharest
- Head coach: Maria Fumea
- Retired: 2006
Medal record
Aerobic Gymnastics World Championships
Silver medal – second place	2004 Sofia	Trio
Bronze medal – third place	2006 Nanjing	Trio
European Championships
Gold medal – first place	2005 Coimbra	Groups
Bronze medal – third place	2005 Coimbra	Trio

Raluca Elena Babaligea (born 5 April 1984 in Bucharest, Romania) is a Romanian aerobic gymnast. She won two world championship medals (one silver and one bronze) and two European championships medals (one gold and one bronze).
