= Mădălina Cioveie =

Romanian aerobic gymnast

- Full name: Constantina Mădălina Cioveie
- Born: 19 August 1983 (age 43) Târgu Jiu

Gymnastics career
- Discipline: Aerobic gymnastics
- Country represented: Romania
- Club: CSS 1 Constanta
- Head coach: Maria Fumea
- Assistant coach: Claudiu Varlam
Medal record
Aerobic Gymnastics World Championships
Gold medal – first place	2004 Sofia	Groups
Silver medal – second place	2004 Sofia	Trio
Bronze medal – third place	2006 Nanjing	Trio
European Championships
Gold medal – first place	2005 Coimbra	Groups
Gold medal – first place	2003 Debrecen	Groups
Bronze medal – third place	2005 Coimbra	Trio

Constantina Mădălina Cioveie (born 19 August 1983 in Târgu Jiu, Romania) is a Romanian aerobic gymnast. She won three world championships medals (one gold, one silver, and one bronze) and three European championships medals (two gold and one silver). She also works as an aerobic gymnastics coach.
