= Kieran Gorman =

Australian aerobic gymnast

- Born: 30 July 1987 (age 39) Joondalup, Perth, Western Australia

Gymnastics career
- Discipline: Aerobic gymnastics
- Country represented: Australia
Medal record
World Championships
Bronze medal – third place	2010 Rodez	Men's Individual

Kieran Gorman (born 30 July 1987 in Joondalup, Perth, Western Australia) is an Australian aerobic gymnast. He is the 2010 International Federation of Gymnastics World Series Champion and multiple international medalist. Gorman is the first gymnast in Australian history to be World Ranked number 1 in all gym sport disciplines.
