= Bogdan Popa =

Romanian aerobic gymnast

- Born: 8 March 1984 (age 42) Arad

Gymnastics career
- Discipline: Aerobic gymnastics
- Country represented: Romania
- Club: CSM Arad
- Head coach: Maria Fumea
- Assistant coaches: Claudiu Varlam, Cristiana Spînu
Medal record
World Championships
Gold medal – first place	2010 Rodez	Groups
European Championships
Bronze medal – third place	2007 Szombathely	Groups

Bogdan Popa (born 8 March 1984 in Arad, Romania) is a Romanian aerobic gymnast. He won one gold world championships medal and one bronze European championships medal on the group event.
