= Florin Nebunu =

Romanian aerobic gymnast (born 1987)

- Born: April 18, 1988 (age 38) Bucharest

Gymnastics career
- Discipline: Aerobic gymnastics
- Country represented: Romania
- Head coach: Maria Fumea
- Assistant coach: Claudiu Varlam
Medal record
World Championships
Gold medal – first place	2010 Rodez	Groups
Silver medal – second place	2012 Sofia	Dance
Bronze medal – third place	2012 Sofia	Groups
European Championships
Gold medal – first place	2009 Liberec	Groups
Bronze medal – third place	2009 Liberec	Trio

Florin Nebunu (born April 21, 1987) is a Romanian aerobic gymnast. He won three world championships medals (one gold, one silver, and one bronze) and two European championships medals (one gold and one bronze).
