= 2014 Aerobic Gymnastics World Championships =

The 13th Aerobic Gymnastics World Championships were held in Cancun, Mexico from 27 to 29 June 2014.

== Medal summary ==
Event	Gold	Silver	Bronze
Men's individual	Ivan Veloz (MEX)	Benjamin Garavel (FRA)	Daniel Bali (HUN)
Women's individual	Lubov Gazov (AUT)	Oana Corina Constantin (ROU)	Aurelie Joly (FRA)
Mixed Pairs	Romania; Maria Bianca Becze; Marius Ciprian Petruse	France; Aurelie Joly; Benjamin Garavel	Russia; Dukhik Dzhanazian; Denis Solovev
Trios	Romania; Andrea Bogati; Oana Corina Constantin; Anca Claudia Surdu	China; Che Lei; Han Mingzhe; Wang Zizhuo	South Korea; Kim Han-jin; Ryu Ju-sun; Go Kyung-min
Groups	Romania; Maria Bianca Becze; Andrea Bogati; Oana Corina Constantin; Bianca Maria Gorgovan; Anca Claudia Surdu	France	China
Step	China	Russia	France
Dance	Russia	China	South Korea
Team	France	Romania	China

== Results ==
=== Women's Individual ===
Rank	Gymnast	Country	Score
Gold medal	Lubov Gazov	Austria	22.150
Silver medal	Corina Constantin	Romania	22.000
Bronze medal	Aurelie Joly	France	21.450
4	Yangyang Yu	China	21.100
5	Roypim Ngampeerapong	Thailand	20.900
6	Daiana Nanzer	Argentina	20.850
7	Sara Moreno	Spain	20.625
8	Denitsa Parichkova	Bulgaria	20.600
9	Viktoriia Titkova	Russia	19.700

=== Men's Individual ===
Rank	Gymnast	Country	Score
Gold medal	Ivan Veloz	Mexico	22.450
Silver medal	Benjamin Garavel	France	21.975
Bronze medal	Daniel Bali	Hungary	21.775
4	Mircea Zamfir	Romania	21.500
5	Vicente Lli	Spain	21.400
6	Maxime Decker-Breitel	France	21.200
7	Mizuki Saito	Japan	21.000
8	Riccardo Pentassuglia	Italy	20.550

=== Mixed Pairs ===
Rank	Gymnasts	Country	Score
Gold medal	Marius Ciprian Petruse, Maria Bianca Becze	Romania	21.125
Silver medal	Benjamin Garavel, Aurelie Joly	France	21.100
Bronze medal	Denis Solovev, Dukhik Dzhanazian	Russia	20.800
4	Guang Yang, Yuhan Wang	China	20.700
5	Vũ Bá Đông, Trần Thị Thu Hà	Vietnam	20.600
6	Vicente Lli, Sara Moreno	Spain	20.550
7	Dacian Nicolae Barna, Alina Radu	Romania	20.450
7	Antonio Caforio, Sofia Pastori	Italy	20.450

=== Trios ===
Rank	Gymnasts	Country	Score
Gold medal		Romania	21.541
Silver medal		China	21.350
Bronze medal		South Korea	21.100
4		Russia	21.091
5		China	20.800
6		France	20.650
7		Japan	20.200
8		Italy	19.375

=== Groups ===
Rank	Gymnasts	Country	Score
Gold medal		Romania	21.705
Silver medal		France	21.527
Bronze medal		China	21.525
4		South Korea	21.105
5		Russia	21.055
6		Hungary	20.400
7		Italy	20.350
8		Argentina	19.483

=== Dance ===
Rank	Gymnasts	Country	Score
Gold medal		Russia	19.150
Silver medal		China	19.125
Bronze medal		South Korea	19.100
4		Romania	19.000
5		Hungary	18.400
5		Italy	18.400
7		Spain	18.150
8		Argentina	17.800

=== Step ===
Rank	Gymnasts	Country	Score
Gold medal		China	18.400
Silver medal		Russia	18.050
Bronze medal		France	17.900
4		Hungary	17.875
5		South Korea	17.775
6		Mongolia	17.100
7		Mexico	16.750
8		Spain	16.350

=== Team ===
Rank	Country	Points
Gold medal	France	9
Silver medal	Romania	12
Bronze medal	China	13
4	South Korea	30
5	Russia	37
6	Italy	40
7	Hungary	44
8	Mexico	51
9	Argentina	59

== Medal table ==
Rank	Nation	Gold	Silver	Bronze	Total
1	Romania	3	2	0	5
2	France	1	3	2	6
3	China	1	2	2	5
4	Russia	1	1	1	3
5	Austria	1	0	0	1
5	Mexico	1	0	0	1
7	South Korea	0	0	2	2
8	Hungary	0	0	1	1
Totals (8 entries)		8	8	8	24
