= 2006 Aerobic Gymnastics World Championships =

9th Aerobic Gymnastics World Championships were held in Nanjing, China from 1 to 3 June 2006.

== Results ==
=== Women's Individual ===
Rank	Gymnast	Country	Point
Gold medal	Marcela Lopez	Brazil	21.600
Silver medal	Huang Jinxuan	China	20.350
Bronze medal	Elmira Dassaeva	Spain	20.250
4	Arianna Ciucci	Italy	20.000
5	Angela McMillian	New Zealand	19.850
6	Ekaterina Cherepanova	Russia	19.800
7	Cristina Simona Nedelcu	Romania	19.650
8	Tania Mihaela Pohoata	Romania	19.300

=== Men's Individual ===
Rank	Gymnast	Country	Point
Gold medal	Ao Jinping	China	21.700
Silver medal	Ivan Parejo	Spain	21.200
Bronze medal	Mircea Zamfir	Romania	21.050
4	Vito Iaia	Italy	20.850
5	Popa Bogdan	Romania	20.700
6	Grégory Alcan	France	20.700
7	Jonatan Canada	Spain	19.900
8	Song Bo	China	19.750

=== Mixed Pair ===
Rank	Gymnasts	Country	Point
Gold medal	Tudorel-Valentin Mavrodineanu, Tania Mihaela Pohoata	Romania	20.450
Silver medal	Wilkie Satti Sanchez, Giovanna Lecis	Italy	20.250
Bronze medal	Aurélie Joly, Julien Chaninet	France	20.200
4	Cristina Antonescu, Mircea Brinzea	Romania	20.150
5	Huang Jinxuan, He Shijian	China	19.550
6	Israel Carrasco, Saray Martin	Spain	19.400
7	Margarita Stoyanova, Radoslov Zhivkov	Bulgaria	19.400
8	Fan Jie, Ni Zhen Hua	China	19.250

=== Trio ===
Rank	Gymnasts	Country	Point
Gold medal	Mircea Brinzea, Tudorel-Valentin Mavrodineanu, Mircea Zamfir	Romania	21.500
Silver medal	Zhang Peng, Qin Yong, Yu Wei	China	21.350
Bronze medal	Raluca Elena Babaligea, Constantina Madalina Cioveie, Cristina Simona Nedelcu	Romania	20.600
4	Cosimo D, Vito Iaia, Emanuele Pagliuca	Italy	20.350
5	Margarita Stoyanova, Assia Ramizova, Galina Lazarova	Bulgaria	20.300
6	Liu Pengcheng, Zhang Xiaolong, Tian Kun	China	20.150
7	Jonatan Canada, Israel Carrasco, Ivan Parejo	Spain	19.800
8	Eugenia Anisimova, Irina Klopova, Julia Amosova	Russia	19.750

=== Group All-Around ===
Rank	Gymnast	Country	Point
Gold medal	Yan Song, Qin Yong, Xiong De Liang, He Shijian, Ao Jinping, Yu Wei	China	21.600
Silver medal	Gaylord Oubrier, Xavier Julien, Morgan Jacquemin, Adrien Galo, Vivien Peralta, Nicolas Garavel	France	20.850
Bronze medal	Tang Peng, Wu Yongjun, Zhang Zhuo, Zhang Xue, Guo Xiaoping, Li Jia	China	20.350
4	Raluca Elena Babaligea, Cristina Antonescu, Constantina Madalina Cioveie, Cristina Marin, Cristina Simona Nedelcu, Izabela Lăcătuș	Romania	20.300
5	Denis Karepov, Konstantin Nekrasov, Vladimir Vorobyev, Roman Tymko, Sergei Konstantinov, Danila Shohin	Russia	19.750
6	Lora Bertone, Arianna Ciucci, Daniela Tosci, Cinzia Galletti, Lisa Milani, Alice Capitani	Italy	19.400
7	Jonatan Canada, Israel Carrasco, Saray Martin, Alexandra Torres, Ivan Parejo, Toni Leyva	Spain	19.300
8	Elena Kurochkina, Eugenia Anisimova, Ekaterina Cherepanova, Anastasia Akhmadieva, Irina Klopova, Julia Amosova	Russia	19.250

=== Medal table ===
Rank	Nation	Gold	Silver	Bronze	Total
1	China	2	2	1	5
2	Romania	2	0	2	4
3	Brazil	1	0	0	1
4	France	0	1	1	2
4	Spain	0	1	1	2
6	Italy	0	1	0	1
