= Table tennis at the 2011 Summer Universiade – Women's singles =

The women's singles table tennis event at the 2011 Summer Universiade took place from August 15 to August 20 at the Shenzhen Bay Sports Center Gym in Shenzhen, China. The preliminary round will be staged in pools, and the top players from each pool will move to the elimination rounds.

== Medalists ==
Gold	Rao Jingwen; China
Silver	Fan Ying; China
Bronze	Ma Yuefei; China
Bronze	Xiong Xinyun; China

== Preliminary round ==
Group 1

Nation	Pld	W	L	GF	GA
Elena Troshneva (RUS)	2	2	0	6	0
Leong Kitweng (MAC)	2	1	1	3	3
Rita Senoo (GHA)	2	0	2	0	6

Group 2

Nation	Pld	W	L	GF	GA
Marina Matsuzawa (JPN)	2	2	0	6	0
Tang Liying (CHN)	2	1	1	3	3
Mulenga Bwalya (ZAM)	2	0	2	0	6

Group 3

Nation	Pld	W	L	GF	GA
Yuko Fujii (JPN)	2	2	0	6	0
Mergen Bayarmaa (MGL)	2	1	1	3	3
Adelajda Isaku (ALB)	2	0	2	0	6

Group 4

Nation	Pld	W	L	GF	GA
Xiong Xinyun (CHN)	2	2	0	6	1
Anastasiia Voronova (RUS)	2	1	1	3	4
Salome Tshegofatso Matlhatsi (BOT)	2	0	2	0	6

Group 5

Nation	Pld	W	L	GF	GA
Liu Hsingyin (TPE)	2	2	0	6	1
Wong Sioleng (MAC)	2	1	1	4	3
Phelemo Gaborapelwe (BOT)	2	0	2	0	6

Group 6

Nation	Pld	W	L	GF	GA
Saida Kudusova (KGZ)	2	2	0	6	2
Martina Smistikova (CZE)	2	1	1	3	3
Nadia Patricia Quinonez Saif (PER)	2	0	2	2	6

Group 7

Nation	Pld	W	L	GF	GA
Claudia Ikeizumi (BRA)	2	2	0	6	2
Olga Baranova (RUS)	2	1	1	5	3
Simone Chuah (AUS)	2	0	2	0	6

Group 8

Nation	Pld	W	L	GF	GA
Polina Trifonova (UKR)	2	2	0	6	0
Lahara Ranaweera (SRI)	2	1	1	3	3
Liz Hajj Nicolas (LIB)	2	0	2	0	6

Group 9

Nation	Pld	W	L	GF	GA
Anamaria Sebe (ROU)	2	2	0	6	2
Usanee Taveesat (THA)	2	1	1	5	3
Tala Haouili (LIB)	2	0	2	0	6

Group 10

Nation	Pld	W	L	GF	GA
Valentina Sabitova (RUS)	2	2	0	6	0
Jerusa Borges (ANG)	2	1	1	3	3
Khadbaatar Tsend (MGL)	2	0	2	0	6

Group 11

Nation	Pld	W	L	GF	GA
Ioana Ghemes (ROU)	2	2	0	6	0
Ng Kai (MAC)	2	1	1	3	3
C Jalekian (LIB)	2	0	2	0	6

Group 12

Nation	Pld	W	L	GF	GA
Hana Matelova (CZE)	2	2	0	6	1
Suh Hyo Yeong (KOR)	2	1	1	4	3
Rosemond Darbah (GHA)	2	0	2	0	6

Group 13

Nation	Pld	W	L	GF	GA
Ganna Farladanska (UKR)	2	2	0	6	0
Stephanie Yuen (CAN)	2	1	1	3	5
Ashleigh Stevenson (AUS)	2	0	2	2	6

Group 14

Nation	Pld	W	L	GF	GA
Katharina Michajlova (GER)	2	2	0	6	0
Ma Chaoin (MAC)	2	1	1	3	4
Sumber Agizul (MGL)	2	0	2	1	6

Group 15

Nation	Pld	W	L	GF	GA
Judy Hugh (USA)	2	2	0	6	0
Jennifer Jacalan (PHI)	2	1	1	3	3
Eveil Dorielle Mabikana (CGO)	2	0	2	0	6

Group 16

Nation	Pld	W	L	GF	GA
Sara Yuen (CAN)	2	2	0	6	4
Lok Hoiyan (HKG)	2	1	1	5	3
Barbara Wei (USA)	2	0	2	2	6

Group 17

Nation	Pld	W	L	GF	GA
Jee Min Hyung (KOR)	2	2	0	6	0
Anna Badosa Cano (ESP)	2	1	1	3	3
Ruhansi Wijekoon (SRI)	2	0	2	0	6

Group 18

Nation	Pld	W	L	GF	GA
Jenny Hung (NZL)	2	2	0	6	4
Poon Chongmei (HKG)	2	1	1	5	3
Nadina Riera Codinachs (ESP)	2	0	2	2	6

Group 19

Nation	Pld	W	L	GF	GA
Moon Mi Ra (KOR)	2	2	0	6	0
Ivy Caterina Plasenica Verde (PER)	2	1	1	3	3
Mbalose Chirwa (MAW)	2	0	2	0	6

Group 20

Nation	Pld	W	L	GF	GA
Cheong Chengi (MAC)	2	2	0	6	2
Pornat Rupsung (THA)	2	1	1	2	6
Armindeep Singh (NZL)	2	0	2	0	6

Group 21

Nation	Pld	W	L	GF	GA
Kim So Ri (KOR)	3	3	0	9	0
Chung Sinwing (HKG)	3	2	1	6	3
Stephanie Shih (USA)	3	1	2	3	6
Louisa Manico (COK)	3	0	3	0	9

Group 22

Nation	Pld	W	L	GF	GA
Jessica Macaskill (NZL)	3	3	0	9	2
Baiba Bogdasarova (LAT)	3	2	1	6	6
Purnima Srimali Wimalarathne (SRI)	3	1	2	4	6
Amina Lukaaya (UGA)	3	0	3	1	9

Group 23

Nation	Pld	W	L	GF	GA
Ma Yuefei (CHN)	3	3	0	9	0
Zhang Sisi (AUS)	3	2	1	6	5
Tvin Carole Moumjoghlian (LIB)	3	1	2	4	8
Chinbat Nominerdene (MGL)	3	0	3	3	9

Group 24

Nation	Pld	W	L	GF	GA
Issaraporn Taotho (THA)	3	3	0	9	0
Barkhas Enkhjin (MGL)	3	2	1	6	4
Natalie Paterson (NZL)	3	1	2	4	6
Nada Haouili (LIB)	3	0	3	0	9

== Elimination Draw ==
=== Finals ===
Quarterfinals
Fan Ying (CHN)	8	11	11	11	11
Chen Szu-yu (TPE)	11	6	4	4	3
Ma Yuefei (CHN)	8	11	11	11	11
Dana Hadačová (CZE)	11	6	9	4	3
Cheng Iching (TPE)	10	7	10	11	7
Rao Jingwen (CHN)	12	11	12	8	11
Margaryta Pesotska (UKR)	11	11	10	9	9	14
Xiong Xinyun (CHN)	7	4	12	11	11	16

Semifinals
Fan Ying (CHN)	11	7	11	13	11
Ma Yuefei (CHN) (bronze)	7	11	2	11	6
Rao Jingwen (CHN)	11	11	11	8	7	11
Xiong Xinyun (CHN) (bronze)	7	6	8	11	11	9

Final
Fan Ying (CHN) (silver)	11	6	6	8	6
Rao Jingwen (CHN) (gold)	7	11	11	11	11

=== Top half ===
==== Section 1 ====
First Round
Fan Ying (CHN)	11	11	11	11
Ivy Caterina Plasencia Verde (PER)	2	1	4	3
Cheong Chengi (MAC)	7	7	3	2
Anamaria Sebe (ROU)	11	11	11	11
Hana Matelova (CZE)	11	11	11	11
Stephanie Yuen (CAN)	5	3	4	4
Poon Chongmei (HKG)	7	5	11	4
Polina Mikhailova (RUS)	11	11	13	11
Chen Szu-yu (TPE)	11	11	11	11
Wong Sioleng (MAC)	2	3	4	5
Suh Hyo Yeong (KOR)	7	11	11	13	11
Ganna Farladanska (UKR)	11	3	7	11	8
Issaraporn Taotho (THA)	1	6	7	4
Yuko Fujii (JPN)	11	11	11	11
Zhang Sisi (AUS)	4	5	5	6
Irene Ivancan (GER)	11	11	11	11

Second Round
Fan Ying (CHN)	11	11	11	11
Anamaria Sebe (ROU)	8	8	6	3
Hana Matelova (CZE)	12	8	11	3	11	6	11
Polina Mikhailova (RUS)	10	11	6	11	6	11	9
Chen Szu-yu (TPE)	11	11	11	4	10	11
Suh Hyo Yeong (KOR)	5	5	9	11	12	6
Yuko Fujii (JPN)	13	11	11	11	12
Irene Ivancan (GER)	15	8	7	7	10

Third Round
Fan Ying (CHN)	11	11	11	11
Hana Matelova (CZE)	6	6	5	3
Chen Szu-yu (TPE)	12	7	11	11	6	9	11
Yuko Fujii (JPN)	10	11	4	9	11	11	8

Quarterfinals
Fan Ying (CHN)	11	11	11	11
Chen Szu-yu (TPE)	6	6	5	3

==== Section 2 ====
First Round
Lee Ichen (TPE)	2	15	7	13	7	11	9
Anastasiia Voronova (RUS)	11	13	11	10	11	3	11
Ma Yuefei (CHN)	11	11	11	11
Claudia Ikeizumi (BRA)	3	1	2	4
Polina Trifonova (UKR)	11	11	11	11
Pornat Rupsung (THA)	4	4	5	8
Barkhas Enkhjin (MGL)	7	7	0	1
Sara Ramirez Bermudez (ESP)	11	11	11	11
Dana Hadačová (CZE)	11	11	11	11
Ma Chaoin (MAC)	1	7	6	9
Lok Hoiyan (HKG)	3	11	7	7	11	5
Kim So Ri (KOR)	11	6	11	11	9	11
Jenny Hung (NZL)	11	11	11	8	14
Saida Kudusova (KGZ)	4	7	7	11	12
Tang Liying (CHN)	10	11	11	11	18
Yuka Ishigaki (JPN)	12	4	9	8	16

Second Round
Anastasiia Voronova (RUS)	9	7	11	11	3	10
Ma Yuefei (CHN)	11	11	7	3	11	12
Polina Trifonova (UKR)	8	8	10	8
Sara Ramirez Bermudez (ESP)	11	11	12	11
Dana Hadačová (CZE)	13	11	11	11
Kim So Ri (KOR)	11	5	6	4
Jenny Hung (NZL)	2	4	11	7	4
Tang Liying (CHN)	11	11	5	11	11

Third Round
Ma Yuefei (CHN)	5	11	11	11	11	11
Sara Ramirez Bermudez (ESP)	11	13	4	8	8	5
Dana Hadačová (CZE)	10	11	11	4	11	11	11
Tang Liying (CHN)	12	9	7	11	7	13	6

Quarterfinals
Ma Yuefei (CHN)	8	11	11	11	11
Dana Hadačová (CZE)	11	6	9	4	3

=== Bottom half ===
==== Section 3 ====
First Round
Elisabeta Samara (ROU)	11	11	11	11
Usanee Taveesat (THA)	8	4	9	7
Marina Matsuzawa (JPN)	11	11	11	11
Moon Mi Ra (KOR)	9	6	7	3
Valentina Sabitova (RUS)	11	11	11	11
Ng Kai (MAC)	5	4	6	2
Martina Smistikova (CZE)	6	5	11	6	9
Cheng Iching (TPE)	11	11	8	11	11
Rao Jingwen (CHN)	11	11	11	11
Olga Baranova (RUS)	5	7	3	5
Jerusa Borges (ANG)	10	11	11	11	7	12	11
Jessica Macaskill (NZL)	12	9	13	7	11	10	7
Sara Yuen (CAN)	11	3	2	4	7
Liu Hsingyin (TPE)	8	11	11	11	11
Jennifer Jacalan (PHI)	4	4	2	3
Yuri Yamanashi (JPN)	11	11	11	11

Second Round
Elisabeta Samara (ROU)	4	7	4	11	11	11	11
Marina Matsuzawa (JPN)	11	11	11	6	6	5	7
Valentina Sabitova (RUS)	11	12	8	4	4	4
Cheng Iching (TPE)	7	10	11	11	11	11
Rao Jingwen (CHN)	11	11	11	11
Jerusa Borges (ANG)	1	1	3	1
Liu Hsingyin (TPE)	11	6	16	6	11	11	8
Yuri Yamanashi (JPN)	8	11	14	11	4	13	11

Third Round
Elisabeta Samara (ROU)	11	11	9	11	11	5	10
Cheng Iching (TPE)	9	13	11	6	9	11	12
Rao Jingwen (CHN)	11	11	11	11
Yuri Yamanashi (JPN)	6	8	8	7

Quarterfinals
Cheng Iching (TPE)	10	7	10	11	7
Rao Jingwen (CHN)	12	11	12	8	11

==== Section 4 ====
First Round
Iveta Vacenovaska (CZE)	11	11	11	11
Leong Kitweng (MAC)	3	7	3	1
Elena Troshneva (RUS)	7	11	11	12	11
Katharina Michajlova (GER)	11	0	7	10	6
Judy Hugh (USA)	3	11	12	7	11	12	5
Anna Badosa Cano (ESP)	11	4	14	11	7	10	11
Baiba Bogdasarova (LAT)	5	4	3	6
Margaryta Pesotska (UKR)	11	11	11	11
Shiho Ono (JPN)	11	11	11	11
Chung Sinwing (HKG)	2	3	2	9
Lahara Ranaweera (SRI)	2	1	3	2
Xiong Xinyun (CHN)	11	11	11	11
Ioana Ghemes (ROU)	9	6	7	9
Jee Min Hyung (KOR)	11	11	11	11
Mergen Bayarmaa (MGL)	6	3	3	6
Huang Yihua (TPE)	11	11	11	11

Second Round
Iveta Vacenovaska (CZE)	11	11	8	11	9	11
Elena Troshneva (RUS)	6	6	11	9	11	6
Anna Badosa Cano (ESP)	11	11	11	11
Margaryta Pesotska (UKR)	7	7	9	6
Shiho Ono (JPN)	11	11	11	11
Xiong Xinyun (CHN)	3	7	4	6
Jee Min Hyung (KOR)	15	11	11	11	8	11
Huang Yihua (TPE)	17	3	9	5	11	5

Third Round
Iveta Vacenovaska (CZE)	5	12	8	11	9	8
Margaryta Pesotska (UKR)	11	10	11	6	11	11
Xiong Xinyun (CHN)	11	11	12	11
Huang Yihua (TPE)	5	3	10	5

Quarterfinals
Margaryta Pesotska (UKR)	11	11	10	9	9	14
Xiong Xinyun (CHN)	7	4	12	11	11	16
