= Judo at the 2011 Summer Universiade =

Judo competition

Judo Judo at the 2011 Summer Universiade
- Venue: Shenzhen Conference and Exhibition Center
- Location: Shenzhen, China
- Dates: 13–17 August 2011

Medalists
gold medal	Japan (7th title)
silver medal	South Korea
bronze medal	Russia

Champions
- Men's team: Japan (4th title)
- Women's team: Japan (4th title)

Competition at external databases
- Links: JudoInside

Judo was contested at the 2011 Summer Universiade from 13 to 17 August 2011 at the No. 6, No. 7 and No. 8 Pavilions at the Shenzhen Conference and Exhibition Center in Shenzhen, China.

== Medal summary ==
=== Medal table ===
* Host nation (China)

Rank	Nation	Gold	Silver	Bronze	Total
1	Japan (JPN)	6	3	6	15
2	South Korea (KOR)	5	4	3	12
3	Russia (RUS)	2	2	3	7
4	Netherlands (NED)	2	0	0	2
5	China (CHN)*	1	1	3	5
6	Poland (POL)	1	1	2	4
7	Ukraine (UKR)	1	0	1	2
8	France (FRA)	0	3	7	10
9	Germany (GER)	0	1	1	2
10	Azerbaijan (AZE)	0	1	0	1
10	Mongolia (MGL)	0	1	0	1
10	Uzbekistan (UZB)	0	1	0	1
13	Brazil (BRA)	0	0	5	5
14	Romania (ROU)	0	0	2	2
15	Algeria (ALG)	0	0	1	1
15	North Korea (PRK)	0	0	1	1
15	Turkey (TUR)	0	0	1	1
Totals (17 entries)		18	18	36	72

=== Events ===
==== Men's events ====
Event	Gold	Silver	Bronze
Extra-lightweight (−60 kg)	Kim Won-jin; South Korea	Chinbat Otgon; Mongolia	Robert Mshvidobadze; Russia
Extra-lightweight (−60 kg)	Kim Won-jin; South Korea	Chinbat Otgon; Mongolia	Toru Shishime; Japan
Half-lightweight (−66 kg)	Hwang Bo-bae; South Korea	Yuito Yoshida; Japan	Florent Urani; France
Half-lightweight (−66 kg)	Hwang Bo-bae; South Korea	Yuito Yoshida; Japan	Ma Duanbin; China
Lightweight (−73 kg)	Denis Yartsev; Russia	Kim Won-jung; South Korea	Marcelo Contini; Brazil
Lightweight (−73 kg)	Denis Yartsev; Russia	Kim Won-jung; South Korea	Piotr Kurkiewicz; Poland
Half-middleweight (−81 kg)	Tomohiro Kawakami; Japan	Rustam Alimli; Azerbaijan	Murat Khabachirov; Russia
Half-middleweight (−81 kg)	Tomohiro Kawakami; Japan	Rustam Alimli; Azerbaijan	Victor Penalber; Brazil
Middleweight (−90 kg)	Abdul Omarov; Russia	Sherali Juraev; Uzbekistan	Valentin Radu; Romania
Middleweight (−90 kg)	Abdul Omarov; Russia	Sherali Juraev; Uzbekistan	Ryohei Anai; Japan
Half-heavyweight (100 kg)	Ryunosuke Haga; Japan	Clément Delvert; France	Zafar Makhmadov; Russia
Half-heavyweight (100 kg)	Ryunosuke Haga; Japan	Clément Delvert; France	Kim Kyeong-tae; South Korea
Heavyweight (+100 kg)	Kim Soo-whan; South Korea	Maciej Sarnacki; Poland	Mathieu Thorel; France
Heavyweight (+100 kg)	Kim Soo-whan; South Korea	Maciej Sarnacki; Poland	Takeshi Ojitani; Japan
Open category	Kim Sung-min; South Korea	Renat Saidov; Russia	Masaru Momose; Japan
Open category	Kim Sung-min; South Korea	Renat Saidov; Russia	David Moura; Brazil
Team	Japan (JPN); Ryunosuke Haga; Ryohei Anai; Takeshi Ojitani; Masaru Momose; Yuito Yoshida; Toru Shishime; Tomohiro Kawakami; Yasuhiro Awano	France (FRA); Florent Urani; Antoine Jeannin; Thibault Dracius; Alexandre Iddir; Farid Ben Ali; Mathieu Thorel; Clément Delvert	Ukraine (UKR); Andrii Burdin; Anatolii Laskuta; Quedjau Nhabali; Ivan Iefanov; Vitalii Popovych; Razmik Tonoyan; Oleksandr Sizov
Team	Japan (JPN); Ryunosuke Haga; Ryohei Anai; Takeshi Ojitani; Masaru Momose; Yuito Yoshida; Toru Shishime; Tomohiro Kawakami; Yasuhiro Awano	France (FRA); Florent Urani; Antoine Jeannin; Thibault Dracius; Alexandre Iddir; Farid Ben Ali; Mathieu Thorel; Clément Delvert	South Korea (KOR); Hong Suk-woong; Hwang Bo-bae; Song Soo-keun; Kim Won-jung; Kim Sung-min

==== Women's events ====
Event	Gold	Silver	Bronze
Extra-lightweight (−48 kg)	Kaori Kondo; Japan	Kristina Rumyantseva; Russia	Violeta Dumitru; Romania
Extra-lightweight (−48 kg)	Kaori Kondo; Japan	Kristina Rumyantseva; Russia	Aurore Urani Climence; France
Half-lightweight (−52 kg)	Zuzanna Pawlikowska; Poland	Seo Ha-na; South Korea	Yuki Hashimoto; Japan
Half-lightweight (−52 kg)	Zuzanna Pawlikowska; Poland	Seo Ha-na; South Korea	Meriem Moussa; Algeria
Lightweight (−57 kg)	Megumi Ishikawa; Japan	Kim Jan-di; South Korea	Helene Receveaux; France
Lightweight (−57 kg)	Megumi Ishikawa; Japan	Kim Jan-di; South Korea	Hannah Brueck; Germany
Half-middleweight (−63 kg)	Esther Stam; Netherlands	Miki Tanaka; Japan	Hwang Chun-gum; North Korea
Half-middleweight (−63 kg)	Esther Stam; Netherlands	Miki Tanaka; Japan	Lin Meiling; China
Middleweight (−70 kg)	Kim Polling; Netherlands	Laura Vargas Koch; Germany	Yuko Imai; Japan
Middleweight (−70 kg)	Kim Polling; Netherlands	Laura Vargas Koch; Germany	Natália Bordignon; Brazil
Half-heavyweight (−78 kg)	Viktoriia Turks; Ukraine	Géraldine Mentouopou; France	Zhang Jie; China
Half-heavyweight (−78 kg)	Viktoriia Turks; Ukraine	Géraldine Mentouopou; France	Jeong Gyeong-mi; South Korea
Heavyweight (+78 kg)	Qin Qian; China	Kim Na-young; South Korea	Emilie Andeol; France
Heavyweight (+78 kg)	Qin Qian; China	Kim Na-young; South Korea	Belkız Zehra Kaya; Turkey
Open category	Kim Ji-youn; South Korea	Aya Ishiyama; Japan	Claudirene César; Brazil
Open category	Kim Ji-youn; South Korea	Aya Ishiyama; Japan	Emilie Andeol; France
Team	Japan (JPN); Kanae Yamabe; Yuko Imai; Aya Ishiyama; Shori Hamada; Yuki Hashimoto; Kaori Kondo; Miki Tanaka; Megumi Ishikawa	China (CHN); Ye Meixin; Guan Chunming; Lin Meiling; Yu Song; Zhang Jie; Chen Rong	France (FRA); Emilie Andeol; Helene Receveaux; Valeriane Etienne; Géraldine Mentouopou; Aurore Urani Climence; Elodie Grou; Heloise Lacouchie
Team	Japan (JPN); Kanae Yamabe; Yuko Imai; Aya Ishiyama; Shori Hamada; Yuki Hashimoto; Kaori Kondo; Miki Tanaka; Megumi Ishikawa	China (CHN); Ye Meixin; Guan Chunming; Lin Meiling; Yu Song; Zhang Jie; Chen Rong	Poland (POL); Joanna Jaworska; Agata Ozdoba; Zuzanna Pawlikowska; Agata Perenc; Katarzyna Furmanek
