= Table tennis at the 2011 Summer Universiade – Women's team =

The women's team table tennis event at the 2011 Summer Universiade was held from August 13 to August 16 at the Shenzhen Bay Sport Center Gym in Shenzhen, China. The teams played in pools in a round robin preliminary round, and the top teams from each pool advanced to the playoffs.

== Medals ==
Gold	China; China
Silver	Japan; Japan
Bronze	Romania; Romania
Bronze	Chinese Taipei; Chinese Taipei

== Round robin ==
=== Group A ===
Nation	Pld	W	L	GF	GA
China (CHN)	3	3	0	9	0
Chinese Taipei (TPE)	3	2	1	6	3
Mongolia (MGL)	3	1	2	3	8
New Zealand (NZL)	3	0	3	2	9

=== Group B ===
Nation	Pld	W	L	GF	GA
Russia (RUS)	3	3	0	9	1
Spain (ESP)	3	2	1	7	3
United States (USA)	3	1	2	3	6
Lebanon (LIB)	3	0	3	0	9

=== Group C ===
Nation	Pld	W	L	GF	GA
Japan (JPN)	4	4	0	12	4
Romania (ROU)	4	3	1	11	4
Ukraine (UKR)	4	2	2	9	6
Macau (MAC)	4	1	3	3	9
Sri Lanka (SRI)	4	0	4	0	12

=== Group D ===
Nation	Pld	W	L	GF	GA
South Korea (KOR)	4	4	0	12	2
Czech Republic (CZE)	4	3	1	10	3
Hong Kong (HKG)	4	2	2	7	9
Thailand (THA)	4	1	3	5	11
Australia (AUS)	4	0	4	3	12

== Playoffs ==
Round of 16
A1	China (CHN)	3	3	3
D4	Thailand (THA)	0	1	0
C3	Ukraine (UKR)	3	3	3
B2	Spain (ESP)	1	1	1
C2	Romania (ROU)	3	3	3
B3	United States (USA)	0	1	1
A4	New Zealand (NZL)	1	0	1
D1	South Korea (KOR)	3	3	3
C1	Japan (JPN)	3	3	3
B4	Lebanon (LIB)	0	0	0
A3	Mongolia (MGL)	0	0	1
D2	Czech Republic (CZE)	3	3	3
A2	Chinese Taipei (TPE)	3	3	3
D3	Hong Kong (HKG)	1	1	0
C4	Macau (MAC)	0	0	0
B1	Russia (RUS)	3	3	3

Quarterfinals
A1	China (CHN)	3	3	3
C3	Ukraine (UKR)	0	0	0
C2	Romania (ROU)	3	1	3	3
D1	South Korea (KOR)	1	3	1	0
C1	Japan (JPN)	3	3	3
D2	Czech Republic (CZE)	0	2	0
A2	Chinese Taipei (TPE)	3	3	3
B1	Russia (RUS)	0	1	1

Semifinals
A1	China (CHN)	3	3	3
C2	Romania (ROU) (bronze)	0	0	0
C1	Japan (JPN)	1	3	2	3	3
A2	Chinese Taipei (TPE) (bronze)	3	2	3	1	2

Final
A1	China (CHN) (gold)	3	3	3
C1	Japan (JPN) (silver)	1	1	0
