= Corina Constantin =

Romanian aerobic gymnast

Oana Corina Constantin
- Alternative name: Corina Constantin
- Born: 12 November 1991 (age 34) Constanţa, Romania

Gymnastics career
- Discipline: Aerobic gymnastics
- Country represented: Romania
- Club: CS Farul Constanța
- Head coach: Maria Fumea
- Assistant coaches: Cristiana Spânu, Mariana Mezei, Mircea Brînzea
- Choreographer: Mariana Mezei
- Retired: 2014, 2017
Medal record
World Games
Gold medal – first place	2013 Cali	Individual
Silver medal – second place	2013 Cali	Trio
Silver medal – second place	2013 Cali	Group
Silver medal – second place	2009 Taipei	Group
Aerobic Gymnastics World Championships
Gold medal – first place	2016 Incheon	Individual
Gold medal – first place	2014 Cancun	Trio
Gold medal – first place	2014 Cancun	Group
Gold medal – first place	2012 Sofia	Team
Silver medal – second place	2014 Cancun	Individual
Silver medal – second place	2014 Cancun	Team
Silver medal – second place	2016 Incheon	Team
Aerobic Gymnastics European Championships
Gold medal – first place	2015 Elvas	Individual
Gold medal – first place	2015 Elvas	Team
Gold medal – first place	2013 Arques	Trio
Gold medal – first place	2013 Arques	Team
Gold medal – first place	2011 Bucharest	Individual
Silver medal – second place	2013 Arques	Groups
Silver medal – second place	2011 Bucharest	Groups
Aerobic Gymnastics World Cup
Gold medal – first place	Cantanhede 2016	Individual
Gold medal – first place	Tokyo 2014	Individual
Gold medal – first place	Borovets 2014	Individual
Gold medal – first place	Borovets 2014	Trio
Gold medal – first place	Ponta Delgada 2014	Trio
Silver medal – second place	Cantanhede 2016	Trio
Silver medal – second place	Tokyo 2014	Trio
Silver medal – second place	Ponta Delgada 2014	Individual

Oana Corina Constantin (born 12 November 1991 in Constanța, Romania) is a retired senior Romanian aerobic gymnast. She is the 2013 World Games Champion in Individual Woman, 2016 World Champion in Individual Woman, 2014 World Champion in Trio and Group, as well as 2015 and 2011 European Champion in Individual Woman. She has been called Romania's most successful aerobic gymnast since Izabela Lăcătuș.

== Personal life ==
Oana Corina Constantin was born November 12, 1991, in Constanța, Romania.

Outside of Gymnastics, Constantin is a lover of contemporary dance and choreography.

In 2016, Constantin was a member of the Romanian Gymnastics and Modern Dance troupe, AEROS which toured in Italy and Switzerland from February to March.

She states her most memorable achievement was winning the 2015 European Championships and her greatest ambition is to win gold at the 2016 World Championships.

She continues her passion in gymnastics as a gymnastics coach and choreographer, dreaming that one day the gymnasts trained by her would reach the top of the podium just as she did as a gymnast.

== Gymnastics career ==
=== Early career ===
Constantin began gymnastics at the age of 4 in rhythmic gymnastics. After participating in rhythmic gymnastics for 11 years and reaching a high level, Constantin decided to switch to Aerobic gymnastics after having difficulties with her back.

=== 2011 European Championships ===
Constantin's first major International event was at the 2011 Aerobic Gymnastics European Championships where she won the gold medal in Individual Women with a 21.500. Here, Romania also placed second in the group with a score of 20.794 by Constantin, Maria Luisa Pavel, Laura Cristache, Delia Lacataru, Anca Surdu, Andreea Bogati, all members of the AEROS troupe. This event led to Constantin being selected as a member of the Romanian team who would be competing at the 2012 World Championships.

=== 2012 World Championships ===
At the 2012 World Championships, Constantin was a favourite to win the gold medal along with Spain's Sara Moreno. Unfortunately, Constanting scored a 21.100 in the qualifications, which was enough to qualify her into the finals in third place. In the finals Constantin finished a disappointing fourth place with the score of 21.150.

In the group, Romania qualified fifth place into the finals with a 20.955 and finished in fifth position in the finals with a 21.105. But she did won a gold medal in team.

=== 2013 World Games ===
The 2013 World Games was where Constantin's talent was on full display, qualifying second into the Individual final with a 21.050, Constantin beat out first qualifier Aurelie Joly of France to win the gold medal with a 21.450.

In Trios, Constantin and partners, Anca Surdu and Andrea Bogati qualified into the finals in second position with a 21.044, in the finals they won the silver medal with a 21.355. The Romanian group of Maria Bianca Becze, Andreea Bogati, Constantin, Diana Cristina Deac and Anca Claudia Surdu qualified in third position, winning the silver medal with a 20.883.

=== 2014 ===
Constantin competed well in 2014 winning the gold medal in individual with a 21.400 ahead of teammate Bianca Maria Becze, and the silver medal in trio with teammates Surdu and Bogati at the 2014 Suzuki World Cup. At the 2014 Barovets World Cup, in Bulgaria, Constantin won gold in both Individual and trio competitions scoring a 21.350 and 20.700 respectively in each routine. In Portugal at the 2014 Ponta Delgado World Cup, the Romanian Trio once again won gold with a 21.205. In individual competition Constantin's winning streak was ended by Austria's Lubov Gazov. Constantin won the silver medal with a 21.600 after qualifying in third position with a mere 20.950.

==== 2014 World Championships and first retirement ====
In Cancun at the 2014 World Championships Constantin was once again a favourite to win the gold medal along with Austria's Lubov Gazov and France's Aurelie Joly. She qualified into the final in third place with a 20.850 and won the silver medal, behind Gazov with a 22.000. After being victorious at their last two international competitions, the Romanian trio of Constantin, Bogati and Surdu was victorious and won the gold medal with a 21.541 after qualifying into the final in a disappointing third place. The Romanians continued to build on their success and the group of Constantin, Bogati, Surdu, Becze and new senior Bianca Gorgovan won the gold medal in the group finals ahead of France with a 21.705.

After a very successful World Championships and two gold medals, a tired and injured Constantin decided to walk away from the sport and take and extended break. "Over the years I had always a very tight schedule and those things accumulated. I always put first gymnastics against other things and I felt tired, so I decided at that time to stop my sports activity. I felt like I needed more than a few months break, I needed a break to do something else besides gymnastics." Constantin stated to the European Gymnastics Union.

=== 2015 ===
==== Coming out of retirement ====
After a year long break, Constantin announced she was coming out of retirement with hopes to win the gold medal in Individual at the 2016 World Championships. "It is the only thing missing." Constantin said.

==== 2015 European Championships ====
The 2015 European championships, held in Elvas, Portugal were Constantin's first competition since her retirement. In qualifications, Constantin scored a 21.350 placing her into the final .100 ahead of leader, Dora Hegyi of Hungary. In the finals she won the individual women's title ahead of Hegyi, who scored a 21.650, with a 21.750.

This title further fuelled Constantin's goal to win the 2016 World Championships.

=== 2016 ===
Constantin's 2016 season started off with the Cantanhede World Cup in Portugal where she won the gold medal in individual women with a 21.900, placing ahead of teammate Bianca Gorgovan and Hungary's Dora Hegyi who scored 21.425 and 21.150 respectively.

==== 2016 World Championships ====
At the 2016 World Championships Constantin walked in hungry. In trio qualifications, Constantin, Surdu and Bogati, who also came out of retirement, placed 11th with the score of 20.113, missing out on the finals. Eager to win the individual gold medal, Constantin qualified into the individual women final in second place behind China's Yu Yangyang. Scoring a 21.800 in qualifications, Constantin won the gold medal with a massive score of 22.050, 0.3 ahead of Yu Yangyang.

==== Second Retirement ====
In January 2017, Constantin announced her second retirement, having accomplished all she wanted to in the sport. "At my last world championships, I won silver", Constantin said, "and [in Korea], I took my revenge."

== Life After Gymnastics ==
=== 2014 ===
After retiring in 2014, Constanin worked as an pilates instructor and as a gymnastics coach.

=== 2017 ===
Since retiring from Gymnastics, Constantin continues to be an active member of the Romanian gymnastics community, coaching aerobic and artistic gymnastics, and continues to be a member of the AEROS troupe. At the 2017 European Artistic Gymnastics Championships in Cluj-Napoca, Romania, Constantin performed in the opening ceremonies.
