= Petru Porime Tolan =

Romanian aerobic gymnast

- Born: 21 March 1986 (age 40) Tîrgu Mureş

Gymnastics career
- Discipline: Aerobic gymnastics
- Country represented: Romania
- Club: CSS 1 Farul Constanţa
- Head coach: Maria Fumea
- Assistant coach: Claudiu Varlam
Medal record
World Championships
Gold medal – first place	2010 Rodez	Groups
Silver medal – second place	2012 Sofia	Dance
Silver medal – second place	2010 Rodez	Trio
Bronze medal – third place	2012 Sofia	Groups
European Championships
Gold medal – first place	2011 Bucharest	Trio
Gold medal – first place	2009 Liberec	Groups
Bronze medal – third place	2009 Liberec	Trio
Bronze medal – third place	2007 Szombathely	Groups

Petru Porime Tolan (born 21 March 1986 in Tîrgu Mureş, Romania) is a Romanian aerobic gymnast. He won two world championships medals (one gold and one silver) and four European championships medals (two gold and two bronze).
