= Mircea Zamfir =

Romanian aerobic gymnast

- Born: 29 May 1985 (age 41) Bucharest

Gymnastics career
- Discipline: Aerobic gymnastics
- Country represented: Romania
- Club: CSS 1 Farul Constanta
- Head coach: Maria Fumea
- Assistant coaches: Claudiu Varlam, Mircea Brînzea
Medal record
World Championships
Gold medal – first place	2010 Rodez	Groups
Gold medal – first place	2008 Ulm	Trio
Gold medal – first place	2006 Nanjing	Trio
Silver medal – second place	2012 Sofia	Men's Individual
Silver medal – second place	2010 Rodez	Trio
Silver medal – second place	2010 Rodez	Men's Individual
Bronze medal – third place	2012 Sofia	Trio
Bronze medal – third place	2012 Sofia	Groups
Bronze medal – third place	2006 Nanjing	Men's Individual
European Championships
Gold medal – first place	2011 Bucharest	Trio
Gold medal – first place	2009 Liberec	Groups
Gold medal – first place	2009 Liberec	Trio
Gold medal – first place	2007 Szombathely	Men's Individual
Gold medal – first place	2007 Szombathely	Trio
Gold medal – first place	2005 Coimbra	Trio
Bronze medal – third place	2009 Liberec	Men's Individual
Universiade
Silver medal – second place	2011 Shenzhen	Aero Dance

Mircea Zamfir (born 29 May 1985 in Bucharest, Romania) is a Romanian aerobic gymnast. He won six world championships medals (three gold, two silver and one bronze) and seven European championships medals (six gold and one bronze). He is also the individual 2007 European champion.
