= Elmira Dassaeva =

Spanish rhythmic and aerobic gymnast

- Full name: Elmira Dassaeva Gaas
- Born: 4 April 1986 (age 40) Moscow, USSR

Gymnastics career
- Discipline: Aerobic gymnastics
- Country represented: Spain (2004-2009)
- Club: Club Deportivo Zaragozano de Gimnasia / Club Gimnástico Aragón
- Retired: yes
Medal record
World Games
Gold medal – first place	2005 Duisburg	Individual
World Championships
Bronze medal – third place	2006 Nanjing	Individual
European Championships
Silver medal – second place	2005 Coimbra	Individual
Silver medal – second place	2007 Szombathely	Individual

Elmira Dassaeva Gaas (born 4 April 1986) is a Spanish retired rhythmic and aerobic gymnast.

== Personal life ==
Elmira is the daughter of Soviet football player Rinat Dasayev, her mother was a rhythmic gymnast. Her younger sister Cristina competed in rhythmic gymnastics as part of Spain's national group.

== Career ==
Living in Zaragoza since the early 1990s, she began practising rhythmic gymnastics at the Club Deportivo Zaragozano de Gimnasia with her sister Cristina. Along with other gymnasts such as Ada Liberio, Ana Bolea or her sister, she made the club become one of the leading teams in rhythmic gymnastics at the regional level for several decades. In the years she has achieved a good number of medals in the Aragon Championships and in the Spanish Championships, both Individual and Group in the children, pre junior, junior and first categories. In 1996 she was champion of Aragon and runner-up of Spain, both in the children category, in 1997 she won gold in hoop in the children's category in the Spanish Championship, in 1998 she was champion of Aragon, and in 1999, 2000 and 2001 junior champion of Aragón and in 2001 she won gold with hoop and silver with rope at the Spanish Youth Championships. In 1998 she won silver in the final of the Spanish Group Championship in the junior category and in 2002 she won gold in the first category in the same competition, and in 2002 and 2003 she was champion of Aragón in the first category. After that she retired from rhythmic gymnastics and took up aerobic.

As an aerobic gymnast she has achieved numerous successes at a national and international level, training at the Aragón Gymnastics Club. In September 2003 she won her first World Cup in the junior category. In 2004 she was 7th individual in the Aerobic Gymnastics World Cup in Sofia, in addition to being the Spanish individual champion. In 2005 she renewed her reign in the Spanish Championships and added the title in the trios modality. The same year she was individual runner-up at the European Championships in Coimbra and won gold at the Duisburg World Games.

In 2006 she won an individual bronze medal at the World Aerobic Gymnastics Championships in Nanjing and a gold medal at the national championships in Spain. In 2007 she went on to top the world aerobics ranking, she was once again the Spanish champion, she won several gold medals in the World Series, she won individual silver in the European Championships in Szombathely and won gold in the World Cup held in Zaragoza. In 2008 she was 9th individual in the Aerobic Gymnastics World Championships in Ulm and was once again the Spanish champion. On 1 March 2005, she was awarded as the best Aragonese athlete of the year 2004 award at the gala organized by the Government of Aragon.
