= Cosmin Muj =

Romanian aerobic gymnast

- Full name: Cosmin Darius Muj
- Born: 6 November 1988 (age 37) Arad

Gymnastics career
- Discipline: Aerobic gymnastics
- Country represented: Romania
- Club: Urania Arad
- Head coach: Maria Fumea
- Assistant coach: Claudiu Varlam
Medal record
World Championships
Gold medal – first place	2010 Rodez	Groups
European Championships
Bronze medal – third place	2009 Liberec	Trio

Cosmin Muj (born 6 November 1988 in Arad, Romania) is a Romanian aerobic gymnast. He won one gold world championships medal on the group event and one bronze European championships medal on the trio event.
