= 2015 Aerobic Gymnastics European Championships =

The 9th Aerobic Gymnastics European Championships was held in Elvas, Portugal, November 6–8, 2015.

== Results ==
Event	Gold	Silver	Bronze
Men's individual	Vicente Lli (ESP)	Daniel Bali (HUN)	Gabriel Bocser (ROU)
Women's individual	Oana Corina Constantin (ROU)	Dora Hegyi (HUN)	Sara Moreno (ESP); Bianca Gorgovan (ROU)
Mixed Pairs	Spain	Italy	Hungary
Trios	Romania	Russia	Italy
Groups	Italy	Hungary	Romania
Step	Russia	Hungary	Ukraine
Dance	Russia	Romania	Hungary
Team	Hungary; Romania	None awarded	Italy

=== Medal table ===
Rank	Nation	Gold	Silver	Bronze	Total
1	Romania	3	1	3	7
2	Russia	2	1	0	3
3	Spain	2	0	1	3
4	Hungary	1	4	2	7
5	Italy	1	1	2	4
6	Ukraine	0	0	1	1
Totals (6 entries)		9	7	9	25
