= Lubov Gazov =

Austrian aerobic gymnast

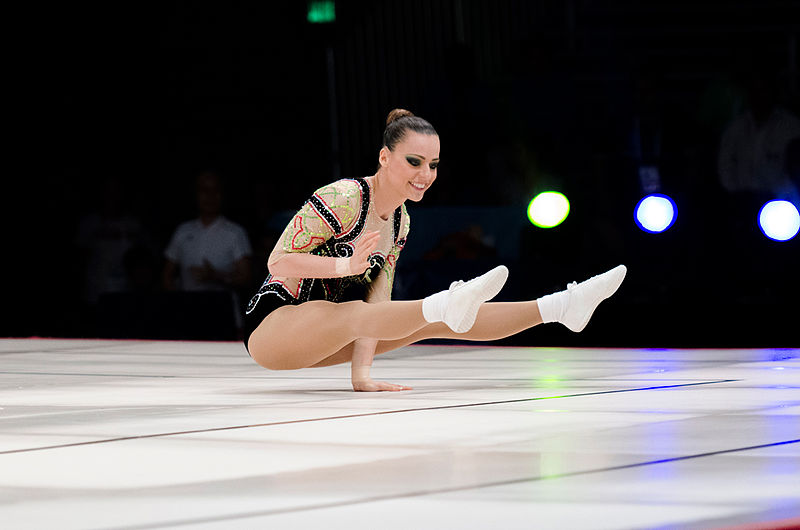

Personal information
- Born: 6 March 1989 (age 37) Sofia, Bulgaria

Gymnastics career
- Discipline: Aerobic gymnastics; Rhythmic gymnastics
- Country represented: Austria
Medal record
Aerobic Gymnastics World Championships
Gold medal – first place	2014 Cancun	Individual
Bronze medal – third place	2012 Sofia	Individual

Lubov "Lubi" Gazov (born 6 March 1989 in Sofia, Bulgaria) is an Austrian aerobic gymnast. At the 2012 World Championships in Sofia, Gazov won 3rd place in the single female category. One year later, she obtained bronze at the World Games in Cali. The title of European Vice-Champion followed at the end of 2013. She became World Champion in 2014 in Cancun.

== Career ==
Lubi Gazov was six months old when she emigrated to Austria with her parents. She graduated in sport in 2007 at BORG Linz school and completed her bachelor's degree in Sports Science and master's degree in Health and Fitness at Salzburg University. Her sports career began with Rhythmic Gymnastics in which she won a title at the Austrian National Championships. From 2002 onwards, Lubi Gazov focused on Aerobic Gymnastics and laid the foundations for numerous international wins. Gazov has trained from the beginning with her mother.

She currently lives and works in Hawaii (Honolulu) and is managing director of her own company "Golden Future LLC". Lubi Gazov is also Real Estate Agent for Century 21 Hawaiian Style.

== Achievements ==
Lubi Gazov succeeded at all of her Austrian Championship participations, winning a total of 15 titles. In 2004, she obtained seventh place at the FIG Junior World Championship in Sofia. One year later, she won the U18 World Cup in Mexico City. Victory followed in 2006 at the ANAC World Showcase along with 3rd place at the World Cup in 2007 in Los Angeles.

Ranked 6th in the world, Gazov officially withdrew from Aerobic Gymnastics in the fall of 2009. Living in Linz, it was no longer possible to balance her world class sports training with her university degree in Salzburg. One year after her withdrawal, Gazov returned to competitive sport in November 2010. First place at the Austrian Aerobic Open was swiftly followed in 2011 by silver at the World Cup in Las Vegas. She won bronze at the Hungarian Open in the same year and came 4th at the European Championships in Bucharest. She won bronze in summer 2012 at the World Championships in Sofia. One year later, Gazov collected a further bronze medal at the World Games in Cali. At the end of 2013, she achieved the title of European Vice-Champion in Arques. In 2014, she won gold at the World Championships in Cancun. Gazov achieved 6 World Cup wins between 2012 and 2015. Furthermore, Gazov is World Record Holder with 210 Double Wenson Push-ups.

== Awards ==
2013: Gold Medal for Outstanding Contribution to the Austrian Republic
