= Saori Inagaki =

Japanese rhythmic gymnast

- Born: 19 February 1990 (age 36)

Gymnastics career
- Discipline: Rhythmic gymnastics
- Country represented: Japan; (2007-2009 (?))

Saori Inagaki (稲垣 早織, Inagaki Saori; born 19 February 1990) was a Japanese group rhythmic gymnast. She represents her nation at international competitions.

She participated at the 2008 Summer Olympics in Beijing. She also competed at world championships, including at the 2007 and 2009 World Rhythmic Gymnastics Championships.

At the 2011 Summer Universiade in Shenzhen, China, Inagaki secured three bronze medals in rhythmic gymnastics
