= Xiaofeng Zhou =

Xiaofeng Zhou, (周晓峰) associate professor, Center for Molecular Biology of Oral Diseases, University of Illinois at Chicago College of Dentistry, is an internationally known oral cancer researcher.

His primary research interest is to utilize molecular genetics and bioinformatics technologies to develop novel diagnostic tools and to gain a better understanding of human diseases such as head and neck/oral cancer. His research is focused on the genetic mapping of disease genes and/or consistent genomic alterations that are associated with the development and progression of oral cancer.

Zhou previously had been an assistant professor of oral biology at the University of California, Los Angeles (UCLA) School of Dentistry, and also was a member of UCLA's Jonsson Comprehensive Cancer Center and the university's Dental Research Institute. He holds a BS in biochemistry and microbiology from Hangzhou University in China; a PhD in biochemistry and a postdoctorate training in human genetics from Boston University; and an MS in software engineering from Brandeis University.

Zhou has published more than 80 journal articles, review articles, and book chapters, and holds three National Institutes of Health grant research projects.

Zhou is also a visiting professor at Sun Yat-sen University, China.
