= Iván Parejo =

Spanish aerobic gymnast (1987–2024)

Ivan Parejo
- Born: 15 March 1987 Barcelona, Spain
- Died: 28 November 2024 (aged 37)
- Height: 1.65 m (5 ft 5 in)

Gymnastics career
- Discipline: Aerobic gymnastics
- Country represented: Spain
- Head coach: Noemi Irurtia
- Eponymous skills: the PAREJO (D family)
Medal record
Aerobic Gymnastics World Championships
Gold medal – first place	2012 Sofia	Men's Individual
Gold medal – first place	2008 Ulm	Men's Individual
Silver medal – second place	2006 Nanjing	Men's Individual

Ivan Parejo (15 March 1987 – 28 November 2024) was a Spanish aerobic gymnast who finished 1st in the Men's Individual event at the 10th Aerobic Gymnastics World Championships held in Ulm in 2008.
