= 2007 Aerobic Gymnastics European Championships =

The 5th Aerobic Gymnastics European Championships was held in Szombathely, Hungary, November 18–25, 2007.

== Results ==
| Event | Gold | Silver | Bronze |
|---|---|---|---|
| Men's individual | Mircea Zamfir (ROU) | Vito Iaia (ITA) | Julien Chaninet (FRA) |
| Women's individual | Lili Yordanova (BUL) | Elmira Dassaeva (ESP) | Aurélie Joly (FRA) |
| Mixed Pairs | France | Romania | Russia |
| Trios | Romania | France | Italy |
| Groups | Russia | France | Romania |

=== Medal table ===
| Rank | Nation | Gold | Silver | Bronze | Total |
|---|---|---|---|---|---|
| 1 | Romania | 2 | 1 | 1 | 4 |
| 2 | France | 1 | 2 | 2 | 5 |
| 3 | Russia | 1 | 0 | 1 | 2 |
| 4 | Bulgaria | 1 | 0 | 0 | 1 |
| 5 | Italy | 0 | 1 | 1 | 2 |
| 6 | Spain | 0 | 1 | 0 | 1 |
| Totals (6 entries) | | 5 | 5 | 5 | 15 |
