= 2005 Aerobic Gymnastics European Championships =

The 4th Aerobic Gymnastics European Championships was held in Coimbra, Portugal, October 27–30, 2005.

== Results ==
Event	Gold	Silver	Bronze
Men's individual	Vito Iaia (ITA)	Iván Parejo (ESP)	Adrien Galo (FRA)
Women's individual	Izabela Lacatus (ROU)	Elmira Dassaeva (ESP)	Arianna Ciucci (ITA)
Mixed Pairs	Romania	Russia	Romania
Trios	Romania	Italy	Romania
Groups	Romania	Russia	Italy

=== Medal table ===
Rank	Nation	Gold	Silver	Bronze	Total
1	Romania	4	0	2	6
2	Italy	1	1	2	4
3	Russia	0	2	0	2
3	Spain	0	2	0	2
5	France	0	0	1	1
Totals (5 entries)		5	5	5	15
