= Aerobic gymnastics =

Type of gymnastics

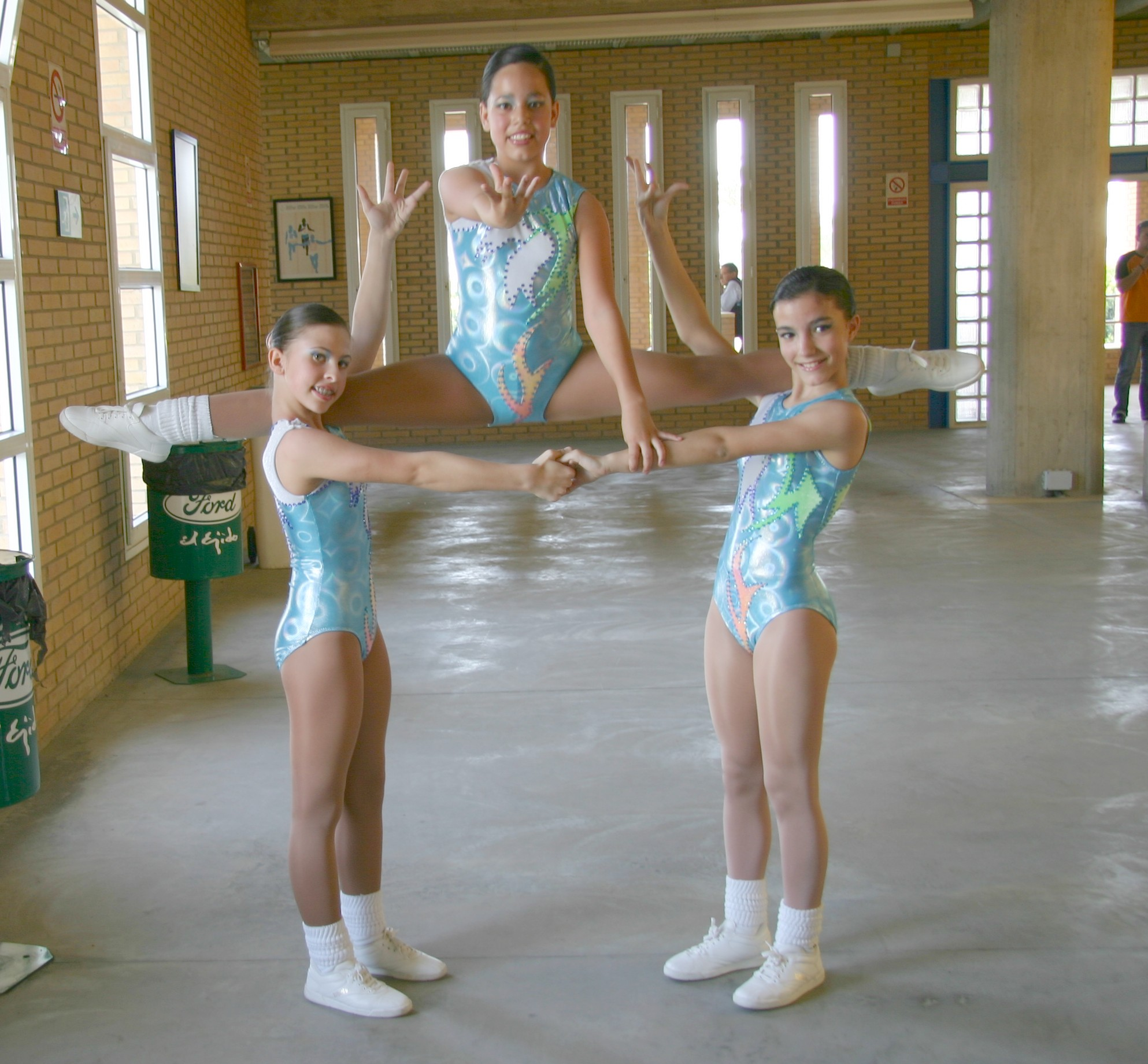
- A sport aerobics team
- Highest governing body: World Gymnastics
- First contested: United States, 1980s

Characteristics
- Contact: Not with opponents
- Mixed-sex: Yes
- Type: Gymnastic sport

Presence
- Country or region: Worldwide
- Olympic: No
- World Games: 1997 – 2021

Aerobic gymnastics or sport aerobics is a competitive sport originating from traditional aerobics in which complex, high-intensity movement patterns and elements of varying difficulty are performed to music. It is governed by World Gymnastics. The FIG designs the Code of Points governing the sport and regulates all aspects of international elite competition. Within individual countries, gymnastics is regulated by national federations.

== Competition format and scoring ==
The performance area is a floor 10 metres (33 ft) square. Seven categories are competed:

- Women's individual
- Men's individual
- Mixed pairs
- Trio
- Group (five gymnasts)
- Aerobic dance (eight gymnasts)
- Aerobic step (eight gymnasts) performed with aerobic step platforms

Trio, groups, and aerobic dance and step groups may consist of gymnasts of any combination of genders. Gymnasts frequently compete in more than one competition category at the same competition and are allowed to compete in up to three at the World Championships.

All routines last for 1 minute and 20 to 30 seconds. Women must wear a leotard with tights or a full-length unitard, and men must wear either a form-fitting top with shorts or pants or a full-length unitard. Men are not permitted to have sequins or long sleeves on their competition costume.

For individual, pairs, trio, and group routines, scores have three components: difficulty, execution, and artistry, which are added together to create the final score. For dance and step routines, scores only consist of artistry and execution scores.

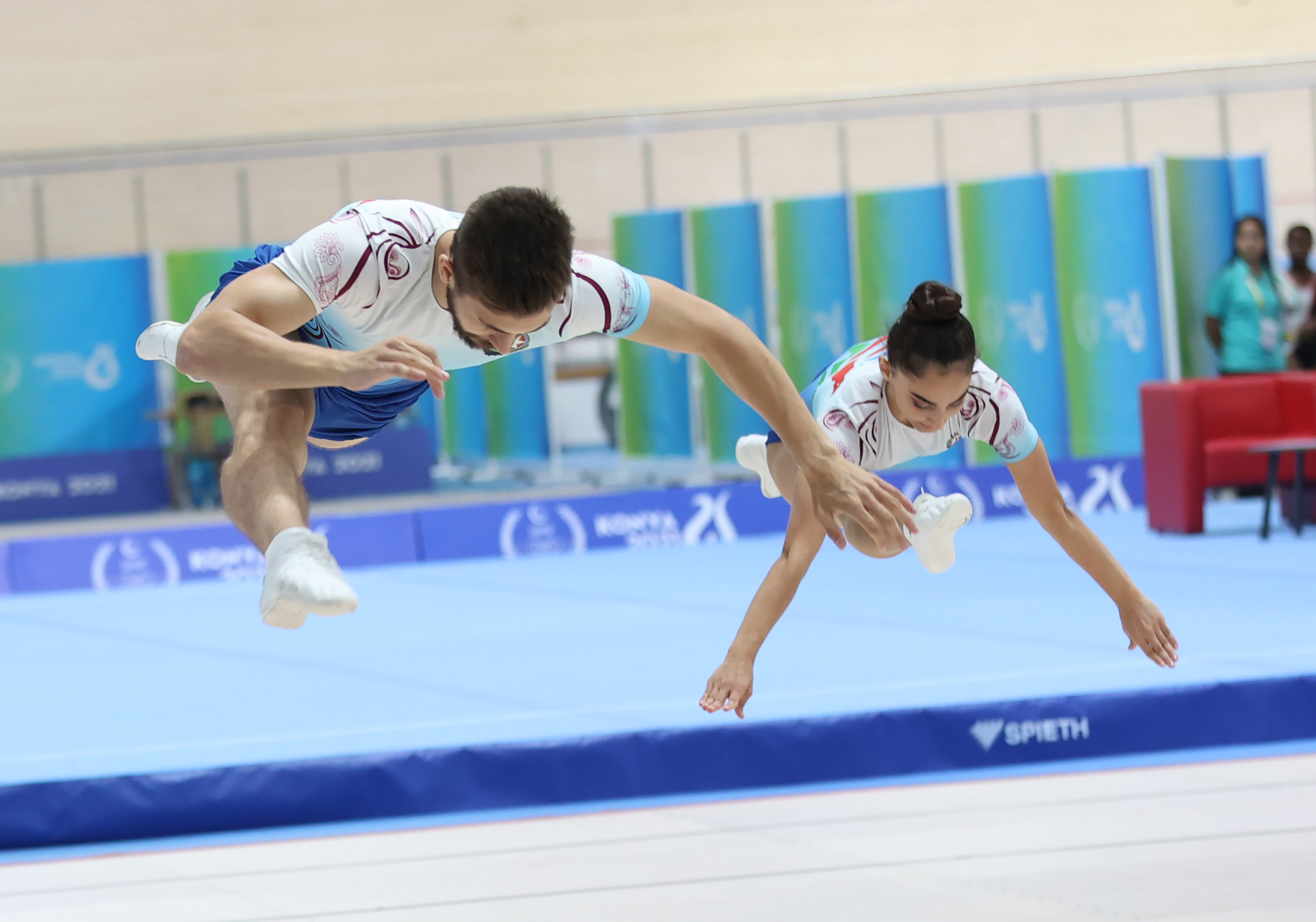
Mixed pairs

Individual routines consist of eight elements; performing more elements incurs a deduction. Elements include dynamic strength elements such as pushup variations and leg circles, static strength elements like planches that may be performed while turning on the hands, jumps, turns, and splits. Limited acrobatic elements such as handsprings are allowed as well. Up to three elements may be performed in combination with each other for a connection bonus.

Gymnasts must perform a variety of elements during their routines. Individual men must perform a dynamic leap element and may not perform flexibility or balance elements, while individual women must perform a turn. Pairs, trios, and groups must perform the same elements simultaneously and show multiple instances of two or more people working together in a collaborative movement.

The difficulty score is calculated by adding together the difficulty values of the performed elements, then dividing by a different divisor depending on the competition category, and for trios and groups, gender makeup. For example, the difficulty a group routine performed by five men will be divided by 2, that of a mixed-gender group by 1.9, and that of an all-women group by 1.8.

The execution score begins at 10 points, and deductions are taken for wrong technique or mistakes. For pairs, trios, and groups, the worst performance of an element across all gymnasts is used to take deductions.

The artistry score has a maximum of 10 points. Routines are evaluated a variety of criteria, such as creativity, musicality and music composition, quality of aerobic movement patterns, use of space, and performance quality.

== History ==
Aerobic gymnastics stems from the aerobics trend of the 1980s, which spawned competitions. The first national aerobic championships were held in the United States in 1984, organized by Howard and Karen Schwartz, who took aerobics from a fitness activity and developed it into a competitive discipline. They also organized the first (pre-FIG) World championships in 1990, with 16 participating countries, and the first World Youth Aerobic Championship in 1998, with specific divisions for athletes aged between 8 and 17 years.

In 1993, various national federations approached the FIG to request it be included as a gymnastics discipline. A Code of Points was developed; the first edition was only 20 pages.

In 1995, the FIG recognised sport aerobics as a new competitive gymnastics discipline, organised judges and coaches courses and launched the first Aerobic Gymnastics World Championships in Paris, with 34 countries sending competitors. In 1997, the IWGA (International World Games Association) included Aerobic Gymnastics in the 5th World Games (Lahti, Finland). Since 1999, the European Union of Gymnastics has been conducting Aerobic European Gymnastics Championships in every odd year.

By 2015, 75 national federations participated in aerobic gymnastics.

== Injuries and health issues ==
As in other gymnastics disciplines such as rhythmic gymnastics, athletes may feel pressured to be thin, especially for athletes with a higher body mass index, even if they are quite thin by typical standards. Pressure to lose weight can come from parents, coaches, peers, and other gymnastics authority figures such as judges, and it can lead to disordered eating behaviors.

A study of athletes competing at the 2022 World Championships found that those who participated in the study trained an average of 16 to 18 hours a week. 73% of participants reported an injury occurring in the previous year. The most common injuries were muscle strains, tears, and ruptures as well as sprains. The legs, especially the ankle, knee, and foot, were the most commonly injured areas, followed by the shoulders, wrists, and hands in the upper body, followed by the hip and spine. More than half of the participants also reported significant stress.

== In popular culture ==
In the American sketch comedy television series Key & Peele, the duo parodies the '80s video footage of the National Aerobic Championship in a sketch showing one of the aerobic dancers experiencing a meltdown while dancing to the championship theme song.

In the Mannrobics taunt in the video game Team Fortress 2, the Alternate-Fire action resembles some moves done in the 1988 Crystal Light National Aerobic Championship.

== See also ==
- Aerobics
- Major achievements in gymnastics by nation
