= Daria Subotina =

Ukrainian aerobic gymnast

- Full name: Daria Oleksandrivna Subotina
- Born: 28 May 1997 (age 29) Myrnohrad, Donetsk oblast, Ukraine
- Height: 164 cm (5 ft 5 in)

Gymnastics career
- Discipline: Aerobic gymnastics
- Country represented: Ukraine
- Head coach: Svitlana Atamanyuk
Medal record
Women's aerobic gymnastics
Representing Ukraine
World Championships
Silver medal – second place	2021 Baku	Aerobic step
Silver medal – second place	2022 Guimarães	Aerobic step
Bronze medal – third place	2018 Guimarães	Aerobic step
Bronze medal – third place	2024 Pesaro	Aerobic step
European Championships
Bronze medal – third place	2015 Elvas	Aerobic step
Bronze medal – third place	2017 Ancona	Aerobic step
Bronze medal – third place	2023 Antalya	Team

Daria Oleksandrivna Subotina (Ukrainian: Дарія Олександрівна Суботіна, born 28 May 1997) is a Ukrainian senior aerobic gymnast.

== Career ==
Subotina was born 28 May 1997 in Myrnohrad, Ukraine. She began aerobic gymnastics at the age of six.

In 2015, at the European Championships in Elvas, Subotina with her team won a bronze medal in aerobic step event.

The following year, Subotina competed at the World Championships in Incheon, finishing 7th in aerobic step event.

In July 2017, the aerobic step team competed at the World Games in Wrocław, finishing 4th in aerobic step behind China, Russia and Hungary. In September, the aerobic step team won bronze medals in the aerobic step event at the European Championships in Ancona.

The following year, Subotina with her team won a first bronze medal in the aerobic step event at the World Championships in Guimarães.

In 2021, Subotina with her team represented Ukraine at the World Championships in Baku, winning a silver medal in the aerobic step.

At the next World Championships in Guimarães the aerobic step team repeated its result, winning silver medals. Later, her team competed at the 2022 World Games in Birmingham, where it finished 5th in aerobic step competition during qualification.

In November 2023, Subotina and her aerobic step team competed at the 2023 Aerobic Gymnastics European Championships, where they won bronze medals in team competition.

In September 2024, Subotina with her team won a bronze medal in aerobic step event at the World Championships in Pesaro.
