= European Gymnastics Shooting Star Award =

European sports award

Shooting Star Award
- Awarded for: "...a gymnast with an exceptional story in the spotlight, someone who is an inspiration for the future generation of gymnasts and the general public alike"
- Country: Europe
- Presented by: European Gymnastics; SmartScoring
- First award: 2018
- Currently held by: Lorette Charpy (WAG); Marios Georgiou (MAG); Alba Bautista (RG); Thalissa Wijkstra (T&T); Lukas Kubik (T&T)

The SmartScoring Shooting Star Award is an award given by European Gymnastics and SmartScoring to a male and female at the various European Gymnastics Championships. It is awarded to a gymnast with an exceptional story in the spotlight, someone who is an inspiration for the future generation of gymnasts and the general public alike.

== Recipients ==
=== Men's artistic gymnastics ===
Year	Winner	Country	Reference
2019	Samir Aït Saïd	France	
2020			
2021	Rhys McClenaghan	Ireland	
2022			
2023	Matej Nemčovič	Slovakia	
2024	Harald Wibye	Norway	
2025	Eleftherios Petrounias	Greece	
2026	Marios Georgiou	Cyprus	

=== Women's artistic gymnastics ===
Year	Winner	Country	Reference
2019	Marta Pihan-Kulesza	Poland	
2020	Ana Đerek	Croatia	
2021	Larisa Iordache	Romania	
2022			
2023	Vasiliki Millousi	Greece	
2024	Ana Filipa Martins	Portugal	
2025	Céleste Mordenti	Luxembourg	
2026	Lorette Charpy	France	

=== Rhythmic gymnastics ===
Year	Winner	Country	Reference
2018	Salome Pazhava	Georgia	
2019	Nicol Ruprecht	Austria	
2020	Linoy Ashram	Israel	
2021	Rachel Stoyanov	North Macedonia	
2022	Alessia Maurelli	Italy	
2023	Fanni Pigniczki	Hungary	
2024	Emily Beznos	Moldova	
2025	Brigita Krašovec	Slovenia	
2026	Alba Bautista	Spain	

=== Trampoline ===
Year	Winner	Country	Reference
2018	Cristina Sainz	Spain	
2018	Oscar Smith	Sweden	
2022	Tachina Peeters	Belgium	
2022	Daniel Schmidt	Germany	
2024	Tamara Ustohalová	Slovakia	
2024	Kristof Willerton	Great Britain	
2026	Thalissa Wijkstra	Netherlands	
2026	Lukáš Kubík	Czech Republic	

=== Aerobic ===
Year	Winner	Country	Reference
2019	Michela Castoldi	Italy	
2019	Daniel Bali	Hungary	
2021	Teodora Cucu	Romania	
2021	Miquel Mañé	Spain	
2023	Vasileia-Faidra Diamanti	Greece	
2023	David Gavrilovici	Romania	
2025	Anastasiia Kurashvili	Ukraine	
2025	Zoltán Lőcsei	Hungary	

=== Acrobatic ===
Year	Winner	Country	Reference
2019	Teodor Velikov	Bulgaria	
2019	Tzlil Hurvitz	Israel	
2021	Francisca Maia	Portugal	
2021	Valery Tukhashvili	Russia	
2023	Alina Puhach	Ukraine	
2023	Daniel Blintsov	Germany	
2025	Norina Froehlich	Switzerland	
2025	Aghasif Rahimov	Azerbaijan	
