= Anastasiia Kurashvili =

Ukrainian aerobic gymnast

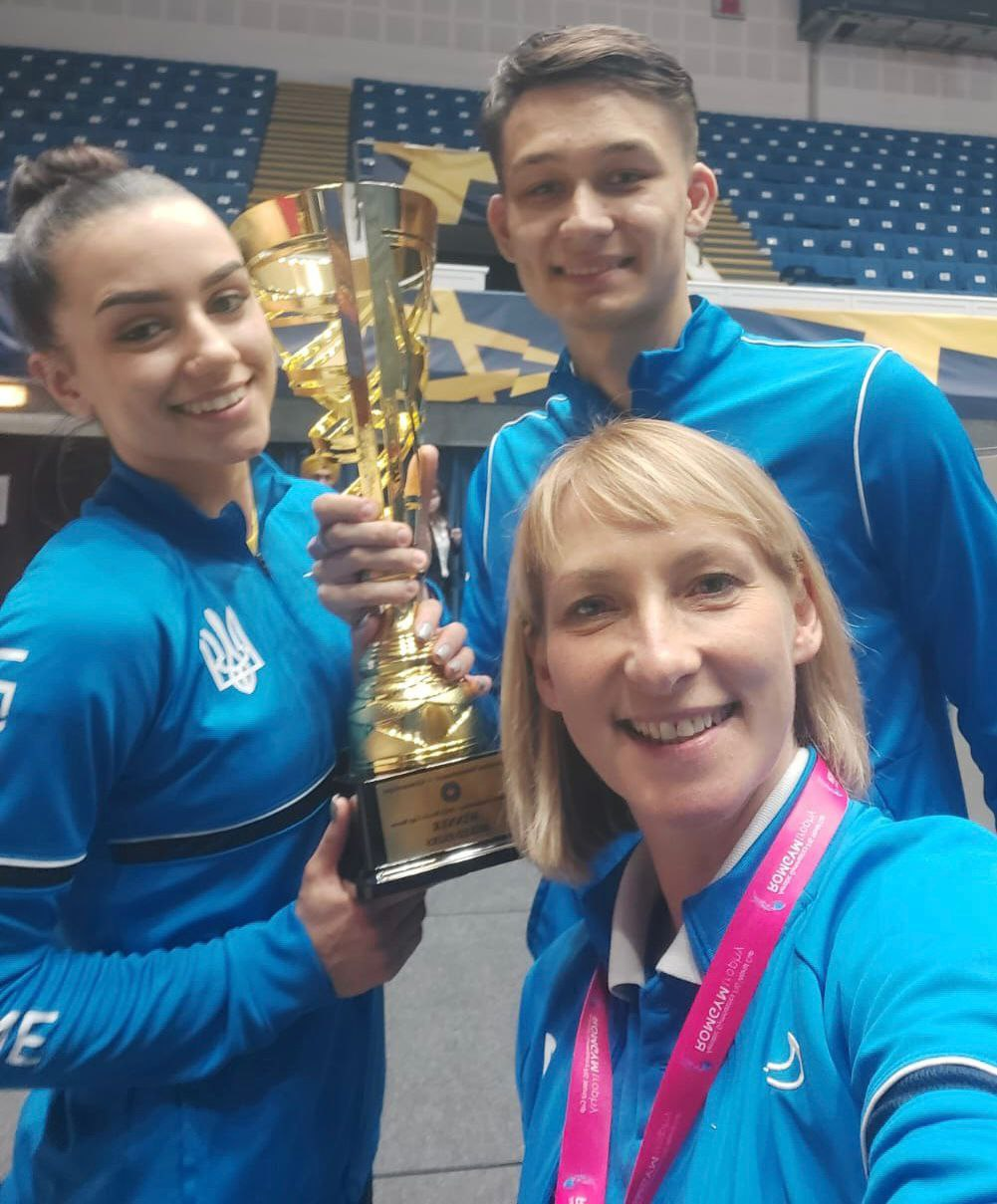
- Kurashvili (left) after winning the 2023 World Cup in mixed duets

Personal information
- Full name: Anastasiia Olehivna Kurashvili
- Born: 25 December 2003 (age 22) Sumy, Ukraine

Gymnastics career
- Discipline: Aerobic gymnastics
- Country represented: Ukraine
- Club: Spartak Sumy
- Head coach: Oksana Dubynska
- Assistant coach: Natalia Fastova
Medal record
Event	1st	2nd	3rd
World Games	0	0	1
World Championships	1	2	0
European Championships	1	2	1
World Cup	8	6	1
World Age Group Competitions	0	1	0
Total	10	11	3
Women's aerobic gymnastics
Representing Ukraine
World Games
Bronze medal – third place	2025 Chengdu	Pairs
World Championships
Gold medal – first place	2022 Guimarães	Individual
Silver medal – second place	2024 Pesaro	Individual
Silver medal – second place	2026 Pamplona	Individual
European Championships
Gold medal – first place	2025 Ganja	Individual
Silver medal – second place	2023 Antalya	Individual
Silver medal – second place	2025 Ganja	Pairs
Bronze medal – third place	2023 Antalya	Team
World Junior Championships
Silver medal – second place	2018 Guimarães	Individual
European Junior Championships
Bronze medal – third place	2019 Baku	Individual
Summer Gymnasiade
Bronze medal – third place	2018 Marrakesh	Trio

Anastasiia Olehivna Kurashvili (Ukrainian: Анастасія Олегівна Курашвілі; born 25 December 2003) is a Ukrainian aerobic gymnast. She is a first Ukrainian world (2022) and European (2025) aerobics champion, World Championships silver medalist (2024), World Games bronze medalist (2025) and a multiple European Championships medalist (2023, 2025).

== Early life ==
Anastasiia Kurashvili was born on 25 December 2003 in Sumy, Ukraine. She finished the local gymnasium No. 1 in her native city. Anastasiia is currently studying at the Sumy State A.S.Makarenko Pedagogical University.

== Career ==
Kurashvili began aerobic gymnastics at the age of five.

In December 2010, she became the youngest competitor of the Ukrainian Cup among cadets, finishing fourth.

In July 2013, she won a Cup of Azov Sea, the all-Ukrainian aerobic gymnastics competition, held in Berdiansk. In October, Kurashvili received a bronze medal in individual at the international aerobics competition, held in Plovdiv, Bulgaria, among pupils. In October 2016, Kurashvili won a gold medal at the Sumy Aerobic Cup in individual event.

In 2018, Kurashvili competed at the World Junior Championships, held in Guimarães, Portugal, placing second in the individual with a score of 20.65. In May, she competed at the World School Sport Games in Marrakesh, winning a bronze medal in trio competition.

The following year, at the European Junior Championships in Baku, Azerbaijan, Kurashvili won a bronze medal in the individual event. In that year, she also won a bronze medal in the mixed pair at the 9th International Open Competition in Portugal.

In May 2021, Kurashvili competed at the World Championships in Baku, finishing seventh in trio. In September, she also took part at the European Championships in Pesaro, finishing 6th in individual and 7th in mixed pair and trio.

During the Russian invasion of Ukraine in 2022, Kurashvili moved to Italy for further training and preparation for the international competitions. In June, she won the gold medal in individual at the Italian Aerobic Championships, qualofying at the World Championships. Later, Kurashvili finished first with a score of 20,950 at the World Championships in Guimarães. Later, she competed at the 2022 World Games in Birmingham, where she finished 6th in trio competition with Stanislav Halaida and Anastasiia Lytvyn in qualification without reaching a final.

In March 2023, at the FIG World Cup in Cantanhede Kurashvili won a gold medal in mixed pair and a silver one in individual. In May, she was nominated for Female Gymnast of the Year 2022 according to European Gymnastics Federation. In October, Kurashvili added to her personal award two silver medals in mixed pair and individual at the FIG World Cup in Bucharest, Romania. Later, she was awarded the Best Acrobatic Gymnast of the Year according to FIG. In November, Kurashvili competed at the 2023 Aerobic Gymnastics European Championships, where she won a silver medal in individual and a bronze one in team competition.

In March 2024, at the FIG World Cup in Cantanhede Kurashvili won two gold medals in mixed pair and individual. In May, she won two silver medals in the individual and mixed pairs events at the Suzuki Aerobic World Cup. In September, she won a silver medal in individual event at the World Championships in Pesaro.

In 2025, Kurashvili won gold and silver medals in the individual and mixed pairs (with Stanislav Halaida) respectively at the 10th Cantanhede FIG World Cup. Later, she finished 5th in mixed pairs event at the FIG Suzuki World Cup.

In August, she competed at the 2025 World Games in Chengdu with her partner Stanislav Halaida, winning a bronze medal in pairs competition, firstly in Ukrainian history. In November, she won a historic gold for Ukraine in the individual event at the Aerobic Gymnastics European Championships in Ganja, Azerbaijan. There she won a silver medal in mixed pairs competition with her partner Stanislav Halaida.
