= 2018 in gymnastics =

The following were the events of gymnastics for the year 2018 throughout the world.

== Acrobatic gymnastics ==
- February 15 – 17: FIG World Cup 2018 (AcG) #1 in Puurs
  - Pair winners: Belgium (Robin Casse & Kilian Goffaux) (m) / Belgium (Noémie Lammertyn & Lore Vanden Berghe) (f)
  - Group winners: Ukraine (Stanislav Kukurudz, Vladyslav Kukurudz, Yurii Push, Taras Yarush) (m) / Russia (Daria Chebulanka, Polina Plastinina, Kseniia Zagoskina) (f)
  - Mixed Pair winners: Russia (Victoria Aksenova & Kirill Startsev)
- March 2 – 4: FIG World Cup 2018 (AcG) #2 in (Portugal) Maia
  - Pair winners: Belgium (Robin Casse & Kilian Goffaux) (m) / Belgium (Noémie Lammertyn & Lore Vanden Berghe) (f)
  - Group winners: Belgium (Jonas Anthoon, Hannes Garre, Bram Geusens, Noam Patel) (m) / Russia (Daria Chebulanka, Polina Plastinina, Kseniia Zagoskina) (f)
  - Mixed Pair winners: Russia (Victoria Aksenova & Kirill Startsev)
- April 13 – 15: 2018 Acrobatic Gymnastics World Championships in (Belgium) Antwerp
  - Pair winners: Russia (Igor Mishev & Nikolay Suprunov) (m) / Russia (Daria Guryeva & Daria Kalinina) (f)
  - Group winners: Israel (Lidar Dana, Yannay Kalfa, Efi Efraim Sach, Daniel Uralevitch) (m) / Russia (Daria Chebulanka, Polina Plastinina, Kseniia Zagoskina) (f)
  - Mixed Pair winners: Russia (Marina Chernova & Georgii Pataraia)
  - Team winners: Russia
- June 29 – July 1: FIG World Cup 2018 (AcG) #3 in (Portugal) Lisbon
  - Event cancelled.
- November 17 & 18: FIG World Cup 2018 - AGF Trophy (AcG) #4 (final) in (Azerbaijan) Baku
  - Pair winners: Russia (Timofei Ivanov & Maksim Karavaev) (m) / Russia (Iasmina Ishankulova & Diana Korotaeva)
  - Group winners: Russia (German Kudriashov, Alexander Sorokin, Valeriy Tukhashvili, & Kirill Zadorin) (m) / Russia (Daria Chebulanka, Anastasiia Parshina, & Kseniia Zagoskina) (f)
  - Mixed Pair winners: Russia (Victoria Aksenova & Kirill Startsev)

== Aerobic gymnastics ==
- March 23 – 25: FIG World Cup 2018 #1 (AeG) in (Portugal) Cantanhede
  - Individual winners: (Hungary) Daniel Bali (m) / (Japan) Riri Kitazume (f)
  - Mixed Pair winners: Italy (Michela Castoldi & Davide Donati)
  - Trio winners: Russia (Elena Ivanova, Ekaterina Pykhtova, & Anastasiia Ziubina)
  - Group winners: Russia (Polina Amosenok, Anastasiia Gvozdetskaia, Elena Ivanova, Ekaterina Pykhtova, & Anastasiia Ziubina)
- April 21 & 22: 29th Suzuki World Cup 2018 Cat. B in (Japan) Tokyo
  - Individual winners: (Japan) Mizuki Saito (m) / (Russia) Ekaterina Pykhtova (f)
  - Mixed Pair winners: Hungary (Daniel Bali & Fanni Mazacs)
  - Trio winners: Vietnam (Viet Anh Nguyen, Ngoc Thuy Vi Tran & Hoai An Vuong)
  - Group winners: Vietnam (Hoang Phong Le, Che Thanh Nguyen, & Viet Anh Nguyen)
- June 1 – 3: 2018 Aerobic Gymnastics World Championships in (Portugal) Guimarães
  - Russia won the gold medal tally. Russia and China won 5 overall medals each.
- October 27 & 28: FIG World Cup 2018 #2 (AeG) (final) in Plovdiv
  - Individual winners: (Brazil) Lucas Barbosa (m) / (Japan) Riri Kitazume (f)
  - Mixed Pair winners: Brazil (Lucas Barbosa & Tamires Silva)
  - Trio winners: Russia (Elena Ivanova, Ekaterina Pykhtova, & Anastasiia Ziubina)
  - Group winners: Bulgaria (Tihomir Barotev, Ivelina Lukaki, Antonio Papazov, Darina Pashova, & Ana Maria Stoilova)

== Artistic gymnastics ==
- February 22 – 25: FIG World Cup 2018 #1 in (Australia) Melbourne
  - Floor winners: (Japan) Kazuyuki Takeda (m) / (Australia) Alexandra Eade (f)
  - Women's Balance Beam winner: (China) CHEN Yile
  - Men's Pommel Horse winner: (Kazakhstan) Nariman Kurbanov
  - Men's Still Rings winner: (China) MA Yue
  - Vault winners: (Australia) Christopher Remkes (m) / (Slovenia) Tjaša Kysselef (f)
  - Men's Parallel Bars winner: (China) WU Xiaoming
  - Women's Uneven Bars winner: (China) DU Siyu
  - Men's Horizontal Bar winner: (Japan) Hidetaka Miyachi
- March 3: AT&T American Cup Individual All-Around FIG World Cup 2018 (#1) in (United States) Chicago
  - Men's All-Around winner: (United States) Yul Moldauer
  - Women's All-Around winner: (United States) Morgan Hurd
- March 15 – 18: FIG World Cup 2018 #2 in (Azerbaijan) Baku
  - Floor winners: (Japan) Kazuma Kaya (m) / (Croatia) Ana Đerek (f)
  - Vault winners: (Belarus) Pavel Bulauski (m) / (Uzbekistan) Oksana Chusovitina (f)
  - Men's horizontal bar winner: (Netherlands) Bart Deurloo
  - Men's parallel bars winner: (Japan) Kenta Chiba
  - Men's pommel horse winner: (China) WENG Hao
  - Men's still rings winner: (Greece) Eleftherios Petrounias
  - Women's balance beam winner: (China) Luo Huan
  - Women's uneven bars winner: (China) LYU Jiaqi
- March 17 & 18: FIG EnBW DTB-Pokal Individual All-Around World Cup 2018 (#2) in (Germany) Stuttgart
  - Men's All-Around winner: (Russia) David Belyavskiy
  - Women's All-Around winner: (China) ZHANG Jin
- March 21 & 22: FIG Individual All-Around World Cup 2018 (#3) in (United Kingdom) Birmingham
  - Men's All-Around winner: (Japan) Shogo Nonomura
  - Women's All-Around winner: (Russia) Angelina Melnikova
- March 21 – 24: FIG World Cup 2018 #3 in (Qatar) Doha
  - Floor winners: (Russia) Dmitriy Lankin (m) / (Italy) Elisa Meneghini (f)
  - Vault winners: (Ukraine) Ihor Radivilov (m) / (Uzbekistan) Oksana Chusovitina (f)
  - Men's horizontal bar winner: (Croatia) Tin Srbic
  - Men's parallel bars winner: (China) Zou Jingyuan
  - Men's pommel horse winner: (China) Zou Jingyuan
  - Men's still rings winner: (Ukraine) Ihor Radivilov
  - Women's balance beam winner: (France) Mélanie de Jesus dos Santos
  - Women's uneven bars winner: (Belgium) Nina Derwael
- April 14: FIG Individual All-Around World Cup 2018 (#4) in (Japan) Tokyo
  - Men's All-Around winner: (Japan) Kenzō Shirai
  - Women's All-Around winner: (Japan) Mai Murakami
- May 6 – 13: 2018 African Artistic Gymnastics Championships in (Namibia) Swakopmund
  - Individual All-Around winners: (Egypt) Omar Mohamed (m) / (Egypt) Farah Hussein (f)
  - Floor winners: (Egypt) Omar Mohamed (m) / (South Africa) Lukisha Schalk & Gabriella Murray (tie)
  - Vault winners: (Tunisia) Mohamed Aziz Trabelsi (m) / (Egypt) Nancy Taman (f)
  - Men's Horizontal Bar winner: (Algeria) Mohamed Reghib
  - Men's Parallel Bars winner: (Algeria) Hillal Metidji
  - Men's Pommel Horse winner: (Algeria) Mohame Aouicha
  - Men's Still Rings winner: (Egypt) Ali Zahran
  - Women's Balance Beam winner: (South Africa) Lukisha Schalk
  - Women's Uneven Bars winner: (South Africa) Caitlin Rooskrantz
- May 24 – 27: FIG World Challenge Cup 2018 #1 in (Croatia) Osijek
  - Floor winners: (United Kingdom) Dominick Cunningham (m) / (Ukraine) Diana Varinska (f)
  - Vault winners: (Israel) Andrey Medvedev (m) / (Uzbekistan) Oksana Chusovitina (f)
  - Men's horizontal bar winner: (Croatia) Tin Srbic
  - Men's parallel bars winner: (Cyprus) Marios Georgiou
  - Men's pommel horse winner: (Chinese Taipei) Lee Chih-kai
  - Men's still rings winner: (Russia) Denis Ablyazin
  - Women's balance beam winner: (Ukraine) Diana Varinska
  - Women's uneven bars winner: (Ukraine) Diana Varinska
- May 31 – June 3: FIG World Challenge Cup 2018 #2 in (Slovenia) Koper
  - Floor winners: (Japan) Takumi Sato (m) / (Switzerland) Giulia Steingruber (f)
  - Vault winners: (Vietnam) LE Thanh Tung (m) / (Switzerland) Giulia Steingruber (f)
  - Men's horizontal bar winner: (Japan) Takaaki Sugino
  - Men's parallel bars winner: (Vietnam) DINH Phuong Thanh
  - Men's pommel horse winner: (Japan) Kohei Kameyama
  - Men's still rings winner: (Japan) Kazuyuki Takeda
  - Women's balance beam winner: (Netherlands) Céline van Gerner
  - Women's uneven bars winner: (Slovakia) Barbora Mokosova
- June 14 – 17: FIG World Challenge Cup 2018 #3 in (Portugal) Guimarães
  - Floor winners: (Guatemala) Jorge Vega Lopez (m) / (United Kingdom) Maisie Methuen (f)
  - Vault winners: (Cuba) Manrique Larduet (m) / (South Korea) YEO Seo-jeong (f)
  - Men's horizontal bar winner: (Hungary) David Vecsernyes
  - Men's parallel bars winner: (Cuba) Manrique Larduet
  - Men's pommel horse winner: (Canada) Thierry Pellerin
  - Men's still rings winner: (Cuba) Manrique Larduet
  - Women's balance beam winner: (United Kingdom) Maisie Methuen
  - Women's uneven bars winner: (Mexico) Ahtziri Sandoval
- July 6 – 8: FIG World Challenge Cup 2018 #4 in (Turkey) Mersin
  - Floor winners: (Turkey) Ahmet Onder (m) / (Turkey) Göksu Üçtaş (f)
  - Vault winners: (Canada) Rene Cournoyer (m) / (India) Dipa Karmakar (f)
  - Men's horizontal bar winner: (Turkey) Umit Samiloglu
  - Men's parallel bars winner: (Romania) Andrei Muntean
  - Men's pommel horse winner: (Republic of Ireland) Rhys McClenaghan
  - Men's still rings winner: (Turkey) İbrahim Çolak
  - Women's balance beam winner: (Turkey) Göksu Üçtaş
  - Women's uneven bars winner: (Turkey) Demet Mutlu
- August 2 – 5: 2018 European Women's Artistic Gymnastics Championships in (United Kingdom) Glasgow
  - Team winners: Russia (Lilia Akhaimova, Irina Alexeeva, Angelina Melnikova, Ulyana Perebinosova, & Angelina Simakova)
  - Vault winner: (Hungary) Boglárka Dévai
  - Uneven bars winner: (Belgium) Nina Derwael
  - Balance beam winner: (Netherlands) Sanne Wevers
  - Floor winner: (France) Mélanie de Jesus dos Santos
- August 9 – 12: 2018 European Men's Artistic Gymnastics Championships in (United Kingdom) Glasgow
  - Team winners: Russia (David Belyavskiy, Artur Dalaloyan, Nikolai Kuksenkov, Dmitriy Lankin, & Nikita Nagornyy)
  - Floor winner: (United Kingdom) Dominick Cunningham
  - Vault winner: (Russia) Artur Dalaloyan
  - Horizontal bar winner: (Switzerland) Oliver Hegi
  - Parallel bars winner: (Russia) Artur Dalaloyan
  - Pommel horse winner: (Republic of Ireland) Rhys McClenaghan
  - Still rings winner: (Greece) Eleftherios Petrounias
- September 11 – 15: 2018 Pan American Gymnastics Championships (Artistic) in (Peru) Lima
  - Individual All-Around winners: (Cuba) Manrique Larduet (m) / (United States) Grace McCallum (f)
  - Team All-Around winners: United States (m) / United States (f)
  - Floor winners: (Chile) Tomás González (m) / (United States) Jade Carey (f)
  - Vault winners: (Brazil) Caio Souza (m) / (United States) Jade Carey (f)
  - Men's Horizontal Bar winner: (Brazil) Caio Souza
  - Men's Parallel Bars winner: (Cuba) Manrique Larduet
  - Men's Pommel Horse winner: (United States) Genki Suzuki
  - Men's Still Rings winner: (Mexico) Fabian de Luna
  - Women's Balance Beam winner: (United States) Kara Eaker
  - Women's Uneven Bars winner: (United States) Grace McCallum
- September 21 – 23: FIG World Challenge Cup 2018 #5 in (Hungary) Szombathely
  - Floor winners: (Israel) Artem Dolgopyat (m) / (Hungary) Dorina Böczögő (f)
  - Vault winners: (Japan) Keisuke Asato (m) / (Israel) Ofir Netzer (f)
  - Men's Horizontal Bar winner: (Japan) Kenta Chiba
  - Men's Parallel Bars winner: (Azerbaijan) Petro Pakhnyuk
  - Men's Pommel Horse winner: (Ukraine) Oleg Verniaiev
  - Men's Still Rings winner: (Japan) Shogo Nonomura
  - Women's Balance Beam winner: (Hungary) Zsófia Kovács
  - Women's Uneven Bars winner: (Sweden) Jonna Adlerteg
- September 29 & 30: FIG World Challenge Cup 2018 #6 in (France) Paris
  - Floor winners: (Israel) Artem Dolgopyat (m) / (France) Mélanie de Jesus dos Santos (f)
  - Vault winners: (France) Loris Frasca (m) / (Uzbekistan) Oksana Chusovitina (f)
  - Men's Horizontal Bar winner: (Japan) Seiya Taura
  - Men's Parallel Bars winner: (Japan) Seiya Taura
  - Men's Pommel Horse winner: (France) Cyril Tommasone
  - Men's Still Rings winner: (France) Samir Aït Saïd
  - Women's Balance Beam winner: (Canada) Ellie Black
  - Women's Uneven Bars winner: (France) Juliette Bossu
- October 25 – November 3: 2018 World Artistic Gymnastics Championships in (Qatar) Doha
  - All-Around winners: (Russia) Artur Dalaloyan (m) / (United States) Simone Biles (f)
  - Team All-Around winners: China (m) / United States (f)
  - Floor winners: (Russia) Artur Dalaloyan (m) / (United States) Simone Biles (f)
  - Vault winners: (North Korea) Ri Se-gwang (m) / (United States) Simone Biles (f)
  - Men's Horizontal Bar winner: (Netherlands) Epke Zonderland
  - Men's Parallel Bars winner: (China) Zou Jingyuan
  - Men's Pommel Horse winner: (China) Xiao Ruoteng
  - Men's Still Rings winner: (Greece) Eleftherios Petrounias
  - Women's Balance Beam winner: (China) Liu Tingting
  - Women's Uneven Bars winner: (Belgium) Nina Derwael
- November 22 – 25: 43rd Turnier der Meister FIG Individual Apparatus World Cup 2018 in (Germany) Cottbus
  - Floor winners: (Israel) Artem Dolgopyat (m) / (Brazil) Flávia Saraiva (f)
  - Vault winners: (Ukraine) Ihor Radivilov (m) / (Brazil) Rebeca Andrade (f)
  - Men's Horizontal Bar winner: (Netherlands) Epke Zonderland
  - Men's Parallel Bars winner: (Ukraine) Oleg Verniaiev
  - Men's Pommel Horse winner: (Chinese Taipei) Lee Chih-kai
  - Men's Still Rings winner: (China) Liu Yang
  - Women's Balance Beam winner: (Brazil) Rebeca Andrade
  - Women's Uneven Bars winner: (Belgium) Nina Derwael

== Rhythmic gymnastics ==
- March 30 – April 1: FIG World Cup 2018 (RG) #1 in Sofia
  - Individual All-Around winner: (Russia) Aleksandra Soldatova
  - Ball winner: (Russia) Aleksandra Soldatova
  - Clubs winner: (Bulgaria) Katrin Taseva
  - Hoop winner: (Russia) Aleksandra Soldatova
  - Ribbon winner: (Israel) Linoy Ashram
  - Group All-Around winners: Bulgaria
  - Group Five Hoops winners: Bulgaria
  - Group Three Balls & Two Hoops winners: Japan
- April 13 – 15: World Cup 2018 (RG) #2 in Pesaro
  - Individual All-Around winner: (Russia) Dina Averina
  - Ball winner: (Russia) Dina Averina
  - Clubs winner: (Israel) Linoy Ashram
  - Hoop winner: (Russia) Arina Averina
  - Ribbon winner: (Russia) Dina Averina
  - Group All-Around winners: Italy
  - Group Five Hoops winners: Italy
  - Group Three Balls & Two Hoops winners: Italy
- April 20 – 22: FIG World Cup 2018 (RG) #3 in (Uzbekistan) Tashkent
  - Individual All-Around winner: (Russia) Aleksandra Soldatova
  - Ball winner: (Russia) Aleksandra Soldatova
  - Clubs winner: (Russia) Aleksandra Soldatova
  - Hoop winner: (Russia) Aleksandra Soldatova
  - Ribbon winner: (Russia) Aleksandra Soldatova
  - Group All-Around winners: Russia
  - Group Five Hoops winners: Russia
  - Group Three Balls & Two Hoops winners: Russia
- April 26 – 28: 2018 African Rhythmic Gymnastics Championships in Cairo
  - Individual All-Around winner: (Egypt) Habiba Marzouk
  - Ball winner: (Egypt) Mariam Selim
  - Clubs winner: (South Africa) Grace Legote
  - Hoop winner: (Egypt) Mariam Selim
  - Ribbon winner: (Egypt) Mariam Selim
  - Team: Egypt
  - Group All-Around winners: Egypt
  - Group Five Hoops winners: Egypt
  - Group Three Balls & Two Hoops winners: Egypt
- April 27 – 29: FIG World Cup 2018 (RG) #4 in (Azerbaijan) Baku
  - Individual All-Around winner: (Russia) Mariia Sergeeva
  - Ball winner: (Russia) Ekaterina Selezneva
  - Clubs winner: (Ukraine) Vlada Nikolchenko
  - Hoop winner: (Russia) Mariia Sergeeva
  - Ribbon winner: (Russia) Mariia Sergeeva
  - Group All-Around winners: Italy
  - Group Five Hoops winners: Bulgaria
  - Group Three Balls & Two Hoops winners: Bulgaria
- April 29 – May 2: 2018 Asian Rhythmic Gymnastics Championships in (Malaysia) Kuala Lumpur
  - Individual All-Around winner: (Kazakhstan) Alina Adilkhanova
  - Team All-Around winners: Uzbekistan
  - Ball winner: (Kazakhstan) Alina Adilkhanova
  - Clubs winner: (Uzbekistan) Sabina Tashkenbaeva
  - Hoop winner: (Uzbekistan) Nurinisso Usmanova
  - Ribbon winner: (Kazakhstan) Alina Adilkhanova
  - Group All-Around winners: Japan
  - Group Five Hoops winners: Japan
  - Group Three Balls & Two Hoops winners: China
- May 4 – 6: FIG World Challenge Cup 2018 (RG #1) in (Spain) Guadalajara, Castilla-La Mancha
  - Individual All-Around winner: (Israel) Linoy Ashram
  - Ball winner: (Israel) Linoy Ashram
  - Clubs winner: (Russia) Arina Averina
  - Hoop winner: (Russia) Arina Averina
  - Ribbon winner: (Russia) Aleksandra Soldatova
  - Group All-Around winners: Bulgaria
  - Group Five Hoops winners: Italy
  - Group Three Balls & Two Hoops winners: Bulgaria
- May 11 – 13: FIG World Challenge Cup 2018 (RG #2) in (Portugal) Portimão
  - Individual All-Around winner: (Russia) Mariia Sergeeva
  - Ball winner: (Israel) Nicol Zelikman
  - Clubs winner: (Russia) Mariia Sergeeva
  - Hoop winner: (Russia) Mariia Sergeeva
  - Ribbon winner: (Russia) Mariia Sergeeva
  - Group All-Around winners: China
  - Group Five Hoops winners: China
  - Group Three Balls & Two Hoops winners: Azerbaijan
- June 1 – 3: 2018 Rhythmic Gymnastics European Championships in (Spain) Guadalajara
  - Senior Individual All-Around winner: (Russia) Arina Averina
  - Senior Team winners: Russia
  - Senior Ball winner: (Israel) Linoy Ashram
  - Senior Clubs winner: (Russia) Dina Averina
  - Senior Hoop winner: (Russia) Arina Averina
  - Senior Ribbon winner: (Belarus) Katsiaryna Halkina
  - Senior Group All-Around winners: Russia
  - Senior Group Five Hoops winners: Italy
  - Senior Group Three Balls & Two Ropes winners: Bulgaria
- August 17 – 19: FIG BSB Bank World Challenge Cup (RG #3) in (Belarus) Minsk
  - Individual All-Around winner: (Israel) Linoy Ashram
  - Ball winner: (Russia) Ekaterina Selezneva
  - Clubs winner: (Israel) Linoy Ashram
  - Hoop winner: (Belarus) Katsiaryna Halkina
  - Ribbon winner: (Russia) Aleksandra Soldatova
  - Group All-Around winners: Italy
  - Group Five Hoops winners: Italy
  - Group Three Balls & Two Hoops winners: Japan
- August 24 – 26: FIG World Challenge Cup 2018 (RG #4) in Kazan
  - Individual All-Around winner: (Russia) Aleksandra Soldatova
  - Ball winner: (Russia) Dina Averina
  - Clubs winner: (Russia) Dina Averina
  - Hoop winner: (Russia) Dina Averina
  - Ribbon winner: (Russia) Dina Averina
  - Group All-Around winners: Italy
  - Group Five Hoops winners: Russia
  - Group Three Balls & Two Hoops winners: Russia
- September 10 – 16: 2018 Rhythmic Gymnastics World Championships in Sofia
  - Individual All-Around winner: (Russia) Dina Averina
  - Team All-Around winners: Russia
  - Ball winner: (Russia) Dina Averina
  - Clubs winner: (Russia) Dina Averina
  - Hoop winner: (Russia) Dina Averina
  - Ribbon winner: (Russia) Aleksandra Soldatova
  - Group All-Around winners: Russia
  - Group Five Hoops winners: Bulgaria
  - Group Three Balls & Two Ropes winners: Italy
- September 26 – 30: 2018 Pan American Gymnastics Championships (Rhythmic) in (Peru) Lima
  - Individual All-Around winner: (United States) Laura Zeng
  - Team All-Around winners: United States
  - Ball winner: (United States) Laura Zeng
  - Clubs winner: (United States) Laura Zeng
  - Hoop winner: (United States) Laura Zeng
  - Ribbon winner: (United States) Laura Zeng
  - Group All-Around winners: Mexico
  - Group Five Hoops winners: Brazil
  - Group Three Balls & Two Ropes winners: Mexico

== Trampolining & Tumbling ==
- April 12 – 15: 2018 European Trampoline Championships in (Azerbaijan) Baku
  - Russia won both the gold and overall medal tallies.
- April 26 – 28: 2018 African Trampoline Championships in Cairo
  - Egypt won both the gold and overall medal tallies.
- April 27 & 28: FIG TRA World Cup 2018 #1 in (Italy) Brescia
  - Individual winners: (China) Dong Dong (m) / (Russia) Irina Kundius (f)
  - Synchronized winners: China (Dong Dong & Tu Xiao) (m) / China (ZHU Shouli & ZHU Xueying) (f)
- May 19 & 20: 2018 Asian Trampoline Gymnastics Championships in (Philippines) Manila
  - Senior individual winners: (Kazakhstan) Pirmammad Aliyev (m) / (India) Shivani Dound (f)
  - Junior individual winners: (Japan) Takumi Fujimoto (m) / (China) FAN Xinyi (f)
- July 6 & 7: FIG TRA World Cup - 50th Nissen Cup (#2) in (Switzerland) Arosa
  - Individual winners: (Belarus) Uladzislau Hancharou (m) / (Russia) Susana Kochesok (f)
  - Synchronized winners: Azerbaijan (Ruslan Aghamirov & Ilya Grishunin) (m) / Japan (Chisato Doihata & Reina Satake) (f)
- August 4 & 5: FIG TRA World Cup 2018 #3 in (Japan) Maebashi
  - Individual winners: (China) Gao Lei (m) / (China) ZHU Xueying (f)
  - Synchronized winners: China (Dong Dong & Tu Xiao) (m) / Belarus (Valiantsina Bahamolava & Anhelina Khatsian) (f)
- September 5 – 9: 2018 Pan American Gymnastics Championships (Trampoline) in (Peru) Lima
  - Individual winners: (United States) Jeffrey Gluckstein (m) / (Canada) Sophiane Methot (f)
  - Synchronized winners: Argentina (Lucas Adorno & Federico Cury) (m) / Canada (Sophiane Methot & Sarah Milette) (f)
  - Team winners: Canada (m) / United States (f)
  - Double Mini winners: (Canada) Callum Sundquist (m) / (Argentina) Lucila Maldonado (f)
  - Team Double Mini winners: Argentina (m) / Canada (f)
- October 5 & 6: FIG TRA & TUM World Cup 2018 in (Portugal) Loulé
  - Individual winners: (Belarus) Uladzislau Hancharou (m) / (China) ZHU Xueying (f)
  - Synchronized winners: Japan (Daiki Kishi & Ryosuke Sakai) (m) / Canada (Rosie MacLennan & Sarah Milette) (f)
  - Tumbling winners: (Russia) Vadim Afanasev (m) / (France) Marie Deloge (f)
- November 7 – 10: 2018 Trampoline Gymnastics World Championships in (Russia) Saint Petersburg
  - Individual winners: (China) Gao Lei (m) / (Canada) Rosie MacLennan (f)
  - Synchronized winners: Belarus (Uladzislau Hancharou & Aleh Rabtsau) (m) / Japan (Hikaku Mori & Megu Uyama) (f)
  - Double Mini winners: (Russia) Mikhail Zalomin (m) / (Sweden) Lina Sjöberg (f)
  - Tumbling winners: (Russia) Vadim Afanasev (m) / (China) JIA Fangfang (f)
  - Team All-Around winners: China
