= 2022 Aerobic Gymnastics World Championships =

17th Aerobic Gymnastics World Championships
- Venue: Pavilhão Multiusos de Guimarães
- Location: Guimarães, Portugal
- Start date: 16 June 2022
- End date: 18 June 2022
- Competitors: 259 from 32 nations

The 17th Aerobic Gymnastics World Championships took place in Guimarães, Portugal from June 16 to 18, 2022.

== Event ==
| Event | Gold | Silver | Bronze |
|---|---|---|---|
| Men's individual | Kim Han-jin; South Korea | Miquel Mañé; Spain | Davide Nacci; Italy |
| Women's individual | Anastasiia Kurashvili; Ukraine | Ayşe Begüm Onbaşı; Turkey | Nea Kivelä; Finland |
| Mixed Pairs | Hungary; Fanni Mazács; Dániel Bali | Brazil; Tamires Silva; Lucas Barbosa | Vietnam; Trần Ngọc Thúy Vi; Lê Hoàng Phong |
| Trios | Hungary; Dániel Bali; Fanni Mazács; Balázs Farkas | Bulgaria; Antonio Papazov; Tihomir Barotev; Darina Pashova | Vietnam; Nguyễn Chế Thanh; Lê Hoàng Phong; Trần Ngọc Thúy Vi |
| Groups | Vietnam; Nguyễn Chế Thanh; Lê Hoàng Phong; Trần Ngọc Thúy Vi; Nguyễn Việt Anh; Vương Hoài An | Hungary; Dániel Bali; Fanni Mazács; Zoltán Lőcsei; Balázs Farkas; Panna Szőllősi | Italy; Davide Nacci; Sara Cutini; Marcello Patteri; Matteo Falera; Francesco Sebastio |
| Aerobic Step | South Korea; Ryu Ju-sun; Ryu Min-ji; Han Jae-hyun; Koh Eun-byeol; Kim Eung-soo; Lee Jun-kyu; Song Sung-kyu; Yoom Chang-il | Ukraine; Anastasiia Isaienko; Kateryna Cherkez; Oleksandra Mokhort; Ilona Shelest; Daria Subotina; Maryna Kutseva; Daria Solianyk; Veronika Sydorova | Hungary; Bernadett Ádám; Anna Dévényi; Enikő Kajtor; Meda Koevesdi; Dalma Kopacz; Réka Solti; Roza Szarvas; Zsofia Vajda |
| Aerobic Dance | South Korea; Kim Hyeon-ji; Ryu Min-ji; Kim Min-hyeok; Cho Eun-ha; Kim Min-ji; Han Jae-hyun; Kim Hyeog-jin; Kim Mun-su | Hungary; Zoltán Lőcsei; Balázs Farkas; Panna Szőllősi; Kata Hajdú; Anna Makranszki; Janka Ökrös; Vanessza Ruzicska; Zsófia Simon | Italy; Francesco Blasi; Arianna Ciurlanti; Nicole Alighieri; Sofia Cavalleri; Andrea Colnago; Gaia Laurino; Alice Pettinari; Lucrezia Rexhepi |

== Medal table ==
* Host nation (Portugal)

| Rank | Nation | Gold | Silver | Bronze | Total |
|---|---|---|---|---|---|
| 1 | Hungary | 3 | 2 | 1 | 6 |
| 2 | South Korea | 3 | 0 | 0 | 3 |
| 3 | Ukraine | 1 | 1 | 0 | 2 |
| 4 | Vietnam | 1 | 0 | 2 | 3 |
| 5 | Brazil | 0 | 1 | 0 | 1 |
| 5 | Bulgaria | 0 | 1 | 0 | 1 |
| 5 | Romania | 0 | 1 | 0 | 1 |
| 5 | Spain | 0 | 1 | 0 | 1 |
| 5 | Turkey | 0 | 1 | 0 | 1 |
| 10 | Italy | 0 | 0 | 4 | 4 |
| 11 | Finland | 0 | 0 | 1 | 1 |
| Totals (11 entries) | | 8 | 8 | 8 | 24 |
