= Davide Donati =

Davide Donati may refer to:

- Davide Donati (gymnast)
- Davide Donati (cyclist)
