= Ayşe Begüm Onbaşı =

Turkish aerobic gymnast

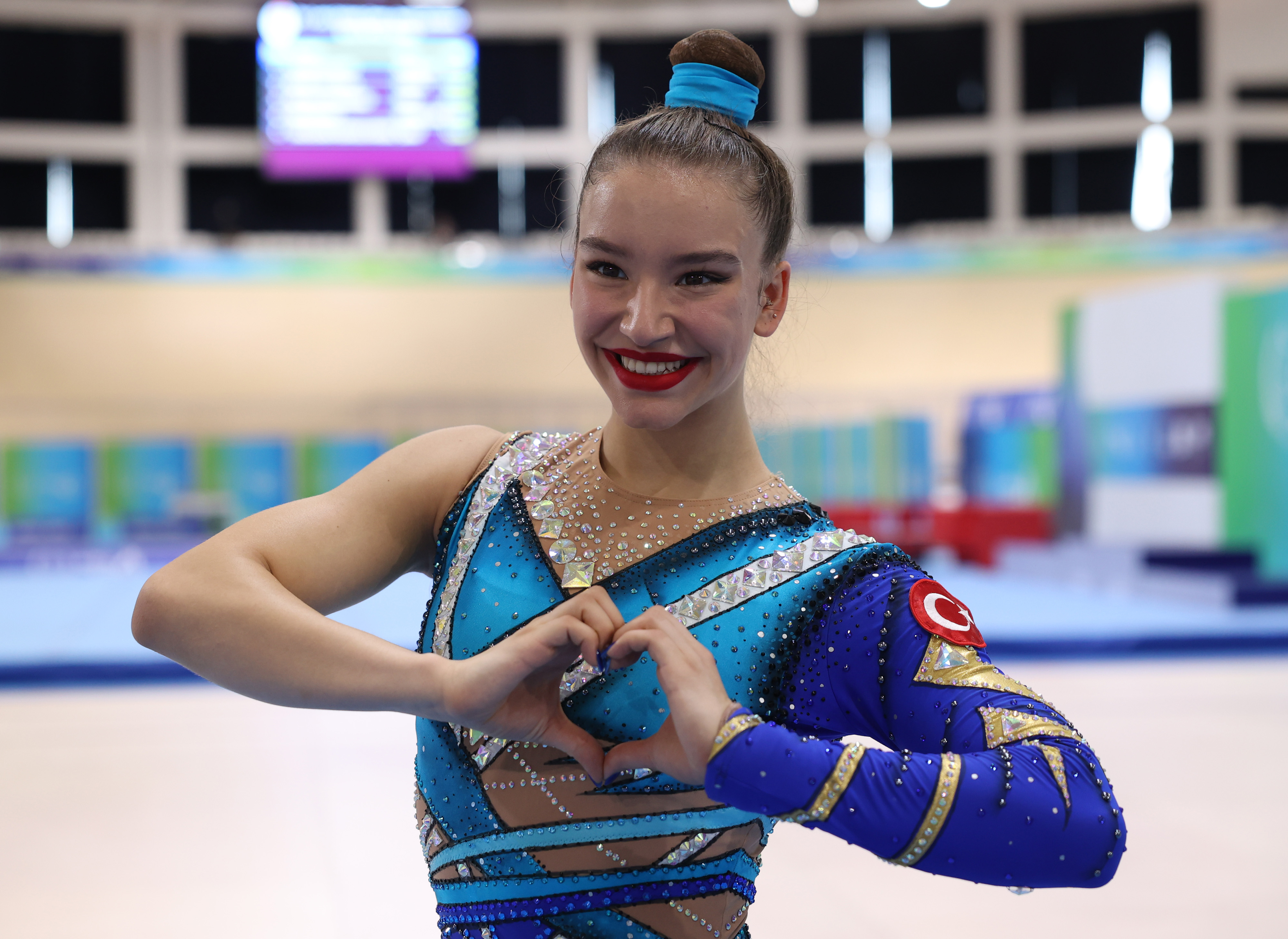
- Ayşe Begüm Onbaşı in 2022

Personal information
- Nickname: "Medal Monster"
- Born: December 9, 2001 (age 24) Akhisar, Manisa, Turkey

Gymnastics career
- Discipline: Aerobic gymnastics
- Club: Manisa Büyükşehir Belediyespor
- Head coach: Gürkan Er
Medal record
Women's Aerobic gymnastics
Representing Turkey
World Championships
| Gold medal – first place | 2021 Baku | Individual |
Islamic Solidarity Games
| Gold medal – first place | 2021 Konya | Individual |
| Gold medal – first place | 2021 Konya | Team |

Ayşe Begüm Onbaşı (born December 9, 2001) is a Turkish aerobic gymnast competing in three events. She is a gold medalist of World and European championships.

== Early life ==
Ayşe Begüm Onbaşı was born to Serkan Onbaşı, a textile products trader, and his wife Seçil at Akhisar district of Manisa Province, western Turkey, on December 9, 2001.

She began learning ballet in her hometown at the age of three. The talented little girl attracted the attention of her Spanish ballet master Maria, who encouraged her parents to let her take up gymnastics. Her father relates that she spent three years exercising gymnastics in a sports hall, trained by a physical education teacher. From the age of six, she continued her exercises under the supervision of aerobics gymnastics trainer Gürkan Er at Manisa Celal Bayar University.

As of 2018 she is a student at the Anatolian High School of Akhisar.

== Athletic career ==
Onbaşı's career in competitive aerobic gymnastics started at the age of seven. In the beginning, she competed in the group events. She became successful in the age categories of 8–9 and 10–12. In 2011–2012, she was admitted to the national team, and took part in international competitions in the Czech Republic, Slovakia, and Bulgaria. She then began to compete in the individual event.

To continue with her exercises for five to six hours a day in a gym, she travels five days a week around 50 km (31 mi) from her home. She is a member of Manisa Büyükşehir Belediyespor, the sports club of the Metropolitan Municipality of Manisa.

Onbaşı competes in three events at every competition. She won a bronze medal in the Cadet İndividual event at the 2015 World Championships held in Mexico despite a fall during her performance. At the 2016 Aerobic Gymnastics World Championships in Incheon, South Korea, she won the gold medal in the Junior Women's Individual event. She was a silver medalist in the Trio event together with her teammates Mehmet Ercoş and Deniz Şahin at the 7th World Age Group Competitions, which were held at the same place for juniors prior to the world championships.

Onbaşı returned with three gold medals in total from the 2nd Mediterranean Championships 2017 in Guadalajara, Spain, and the 7th International Open Competition 2017 in Cantanhede, Portugal. She captured another gold medal in the Junior Women's Individual event at the 2017 Aerobic Gymnastics European Championships in Ancona, Italy. She won the silver medal at the 2018 Gymnasiade in Marrakesh, Morocco. She earned a bronze medal in the Junior Women's Individual event at the 2018 Aerobic Gymnastics World Championships in Guimarães, Portugal.

Nicknamed the "Medal Monster", as of July 2016 Onbaşı has won more than 60 medals, including 35 gold medals, at national and international competitions.

She won the gold medal in the Women's individual event at the 2021 Aerobic Gymnastics World Championships in Baku, Azerbaijan.

At the 2021 Islamic Solidarity Games held at Konya, Turkey in 2022, Onbaşı took the gold medal in the individual event.
