= 2024 Aerobic Gymnastics World Championships =

18th Aerobic Gymnastics World Championships
- Venue: Vitrifrigo Arena
- Location: Pesaro, Italy
- Dates: 27–29 September

The 18th Aerobic Gymnastics World Championships took place in Pesaro, Italy from September 27 to 29, 2024.

== Event ==
Event	Gold	Silver	Bronze
Men's individual	Miquel Mañé; Spain	Mizuki Saito; Japan	Davide Nacci; Italy
Women's individual	Riri Kitazume; Japan	Anastasiia Kurashvili; Ukraine	Maëlys Lenclos; France
Mixed Pairs	Japan; Riri Kitazume; Mizuki Saito	Azerbaijan; Vladimir Dolmatov; Madina Mustafayeva	Brazil; Tamires Silva; Lucas Barbosa
Trios	China; Zhang Jingshan; Wang Zhenhao; Zhang Qingzhou	France; Maëlys Lenclos; Clara Lestruhaut; Victoria Trosset	Bulgaria; Tihomir Barotev; Borislava Ivanova; Antonio Papazov
Groups	China; Fan Siwei; Feng Lei; Liu Yunsong; Zhang Jingshan; Li Lihao	Vietnam; Nguyễn Chế Thanh; Nguyễn Việt Anh; Vương Hoài An; Trần Ngọc Thúy Vi; Lê Hoàng Phong	Italy; Marcello Patteri; Matteo Falera; Sara Cutini; Francesco Sebastio; Davide Nacci
Aerobic Step	South Korea; Song Sungkyu; Cho Eunha; Kim Min-ji; Yoon Changil; Kim Munsu; Kim Hyeonji; Moon Chaeran; Lee Hakjoo	China; Duan Jiahao; Liang Weijun; Wang Jia; Yu Jiaming; Zhang Gaojie; Cai Jiaxuan; Xi Yuefeng; Ye Boyu	Ukraine; Alisa Diachenko; Maryna Kutseva; Mariia Yatsenko; Daria Subotina; Veronika Sydorova; Ilona Shelest; Artem Kokarev; Alina Hołub
Aerobic Dance	Hungary; Antonia Konig; Tunde Himmel; Kamilla Goda; Andras Agoston Mikulecz; Anna Makranszki; Vanessza Ruzicska; Fruzsina Fejer; Zoltan Locsei	Romania; Vlăduț Popa; Larisa Suiu; Mara Dragomir; Claudia Ristea; Madalin Boldea; Antonio Surdu; Darius Branda; Daria Mihaiu	South Korea; Lee Jun-kyu; Han Jae-hyun; Koh Eun-byeol; Park Yeon-sun; Kim Eung-soo; Kim Hyeog-jin; Shin Jin-ho; Ryu Min-ji
Team	Italy	Romania	China

== Medal table ==
* Host nation (Italy)

Rank	Nation	Gold	Silver	Bronze	Total
1	China	2	1	1	4
2	Japan	2	1	0	3
3	Italy*	1	0	2	3
4	South Korea	1	0	1	2
5	Hungary	1	0	0	1
5	Spain	1	0	0	1
7	Romania	0	2	0	2
8	France	0	1	1	2
8	Ukraine	0	1	1	2
10	Azerbaijan	0	1	0	1
10	Vietnam	0	1	0	1
12	Brazil	0	0	1	1
12	Bulgaria	0	0	1	1
Totals (13 entries)		8	8	8	24
