= 2013 Aerobic Gymnastics European Championships =

The 8th Aerobic Gymnastics European Championships was held in Arques, France November 4–10, 2013.

Championships was also qualification event for 2015 European Games in mixed pairs and groups.

== Results ==
Event	Gold	Silver	Bronze
Men's individual	Riccardo Pentassuglia (ITA)	Mircea Zamfir (ROU)	Benjamin Garavel (FRA)
Women's individual	Sara Moreno (ESP)	Lubov Gazov (AUT)	Dora Hegyi (HUN)
Mixed Pairs	Russia; Romania	Not Awarded	Italy
Trio's	Romania	Russia	France
Groups	France	Romania	Russia
Step	Russia	France	Hungary
Dance	Russia	Hungary	France
Team	Romania	Russia	Italy

=== Medal table ===
Rank	Nation	Gold	Silver	Bronze	Total
1	Russia	3	2	1	6
2	Romania	3	2	0	5
3	France	1	1	3	5
4	Italy	1	0	2	3
5	Spain	1	0	0	1
6	Hungary	0	1	2	3
7	Austria	0	1	0	1
Totals (7 entries)		9	7	8	24

== Participating nations ==
- Austria (2)
- Bulgaria (2)
- Czech Republic (15)
- Finland (5)
- France (11)
- Germany (3)
- Great Britain (8)
- Greece (1)
- Hungary (28)
- Israel (1)
- Italy (16)
- Latvia (1)
- Lithuania (3)
- Portugal (9)
- Romania (11)
- Russia (24)
- Spain (11)
- Slovakia (2)
- Sweden (1)
- Turkey (1)
- Ukraine (29)

Countries that competed only in Junior events: Estonia.
