= Dieudonné Kitty =

Beninese aerobic gymnast (born 1996)

- Born: 1996 (age 29–30) Cotonou

Gymnastics career
- Discipline: Aerobic gymnastics
- Country represented: Benin

Fernand Dieudonné Kitty, born in 1996 in Cotonou, Benin, is a aerobic gymnast.

== Career ==
Kitty is a silver medalist in mixed duet and a team bronze medalist at the 2018 African Aerobics Championships in Brazzaville.

At the 2020 African Aerobic Gymnastics Championships in Sharm el-Sheikh, he won silver in the team event and bronze in the mixed duet and mixed trio.
