= Gymnastics (disambiguation) =

Gymnastics is a type of sport.

Gymnastics may also refer to:

- Artistic gymnastics, an Olympic event that includes vault, uneven bars, balance beam, and floor for women, and floor exercise, pommel horse, still rings, vault, parallel bars, and high bar for men.
- Rhythmic gymnastics, a sport that involves performing a floor routine to music, with the aid of either a ball, ribbon, hoop, clubs, or rope.
- Display gymnastics, an activity involving between 6 and 150 people performing synchronized, choreographed routines.
- Sport aerobics or Aerobic gymnastics, a routine that emphasizes strength-building, flexibility, and aerobic fitness.
- Acrobatic gymnastics, a competitive sport involving acrobatics and gymnastics.
- "Gymnastics", an episode of the television series Teletubbies
