= Davide Donati (gymnast) =

Italian aerobic gymnast (born 1994)

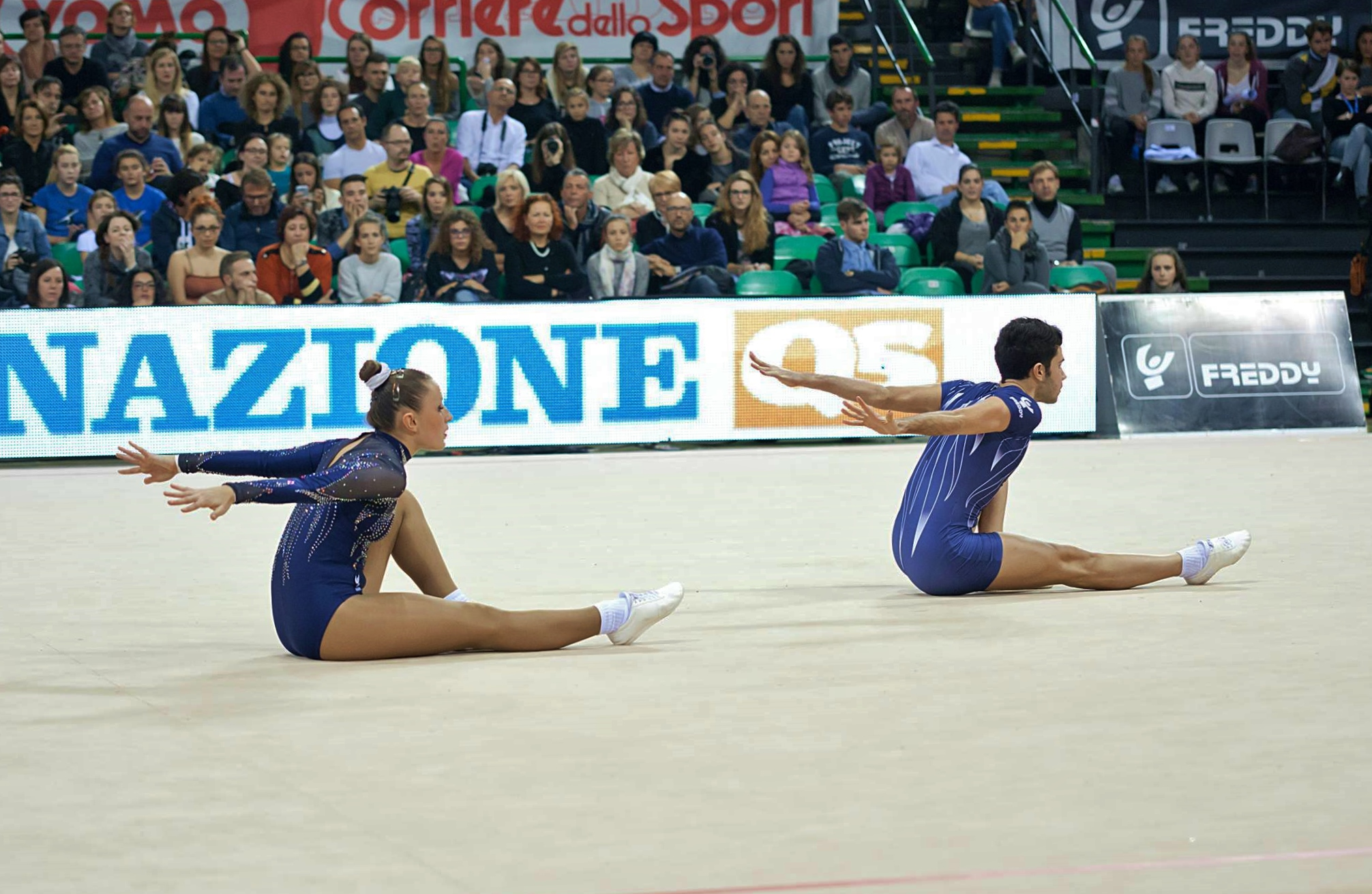
- Born: 25 April 1994 (age 32) Vimercate, Italy
- Height: 178 cm (5 ft 10 in)

Gymnastics career
- Discipline: Aerobic gymnastics
- Country represented: Italy (Italy)
- Club: Delfino-Camuzzago Fitness Club
- Head coach: Cristina Casentini (national)
- Assistant coaches: Gaia Brambilla, Alessandra Garibaldi (club)
Medal record
Aerobic gymnastics
Representing Italy
Event / 1st / 2nd / 3rd; FIG World Cup series / 2 / 4 / 0
World Championships
Gold medal – first place	2016 Incheon	Mixed Pair
Gold medal – first place	2018 Guimarães	Mixed Pair
Gold medal – first place	2021 Baku	Mixed Pair
Silver medal – second place	2016 Incheon	Group
Bronze medal – third place	2021 Baku	Group
European Games
Gold medal – first place	2019 Minsk	Mixed Pair
Silver medal – second place	2015 Baku	Mixed Pair

Davide Donati (born 25 April 1994) is an Italian aerobic gymnast. Along with his partner Michela Castoldi, Donati is the 2016 and 2018 Aerobic Gymnastics World Champion and the 2015 European Games silver medalist in the Mixed Pairs category. He was also a member of the silver medalist Italian group at the 2016 World Championships.
