= 2021 Aerobic Gymnastics World Championships =

16th Aerobic Gymnastics World Championships
- Location: Baku, Azerbaijan
- Start date: 27 May 2021
- End date: 30 May 2021
- Competitors: 166 from 22 nations

The 16th Aerobic Gymnastics World Championships took place in Baku, Azerbaijan from 27 to 29 May 2021.

== Event ==
Event	Gold	Silver	Bronze
Men's individual	Miquel Mañé; Spain	Roman Semenov; RGF	Lucas Barbosa; Brazil
Women's individual	Ayşe Begüm Onbaşı; Turkey	Darina Pashova; Bulgaria	Daria Tikhonova; RGF
Mixed Pairs	Italy; Davide Donati; Michela Castoldi	Hungary; Dániel Bali; Fanni Mazács	RGF; Tatyana Konakova; Grigorii Shikhaleev
Trios	Bulgaria; Antonio Papazov; Darina Pashova; Tihomir Barotev	Hungary; Dániel Bali; Fanni Mazács; Balázs Farkas	Romania; Teodora Cucu; Daniel Ţavoc; David Gavrilovici
Groups	Romania; Gabriel Bocser; Teodora Cucu; Daniel Ţavoc; David Gavrilovici; Mihai Alin Popa	Hungary; Zoltán Lőcsei; Dániel Bali; Fanni Mazács; Balázs Farkas; Panna Szőllősi	Italy; Michela Castoldi; Davide Donati; Emanuele Caponera; Paolo Conti; Sara Natella
Aerobic Step	RGF; Irina Dobriagina; Aleksei Germanov; Aleksandra Chernousova; Anastasia Dmitrieva; Polina Golubeva; Anastasiia Gvozdetskaia; Elizaveta Pelevina; Mariia Tereshina	Ukraine; Anastasiia Lytvyn; Oleksandra Mokhort; Yuliia Samoilenko; Daria Subotina; Anna Timchenko; Kateryna Cherkez; Darya Gutsalyuk; Ilona Shelest	Italy; Davide Nacci; Francesco Sebastio; Ylenia Barbagallo; Francesco Blasi; Sofia Cavalleri; Matteo Falera; Sarah Ferragina; Silvia Santuccio
Aerobic Dance	Azerbaijan; Nurjan Jabbarli; Madina Mustafayeva; Imran Imranov; Elchin Mammadov; Narmina Huseynova; Aykhan Ahmadli; Nigar Ibrahimbayli; Akif Karimli	RGF; Ilia Ostapenko; Aleksei Zhuravlev; Aleksei Germanov; Anton Kolobov; Garsevan Dzhanazian; Ivan Basov; Dmitrii Kudriavtsev; Aerem Markelov	Hungary; Zoltán Lőcsei; Kata Hajdú; Anna Makranszki; Zsófia Simon; Balázs Farkas; Panna Szőllősi; Janka Ökrös; Vanessza Ruzicska

== Medal table ==
* Host nation (Azerbaijan)

Rank	Nation	Gold	Silver	Bronze	Total
1	RGF	2	2	2	6
2	Romania	1	1	1	3
3	Bulgaria	1	1	0	2
4	Italy	1	0	2	3
5	Azerbaijan*	1	0	0	1
5	Spain	1	0	0	1
5	Turkey	1	0	0	1
8	Hungary	0	3	2	5
9	Ukraine	0	1	0	1
10	Brazil	0	0	1	1
Totals (10 entries)		8	8	8	24

== Results ==
=== Women's Individual ===
Rank	Gymnast	Country	Score
Gold medal	Ayşe Begüm Onbaşı	Turkey	21.850
Silver medal	Darina Pashova	Bulgaria	21.850
Bronze medal	Daria Tikhonova	RGF	21.850
4	Teodora Cucu	Romania	21.650
5	Tatyana Konakova	RGF	21.400
6	Anna Bullo	Italy	21.300
7	Belén Guillemot	Spain	21.300
8	Sara Cutini	Italy	20.800

=== Individual Men ===
Rank	Gymnast	Country	Score
Gold medal	Miquel Mañé	Spain	22.350
Silver medal	Roman Semenov	RGF	22.200
Bronze medal	Lucas Barbosa	Brazil	22.150
4	Gabriel Bocser	Romania	21.950
5	Davide Nacci	Italy	21.700
6	Ilia Ostapenko	RGF	21.700
7	Vladimir Dolmatov	Azerbaijan	21.100
8	Antonio Papazov	Bulgaria	19.600

=== Mixed Pair ===
Rank	Gymnast	Country	Score
Gold medal	Michela Castoldi / Davide Donati	Italy	22.400
Silver medal	Dániel Bali / Fanni Mazács	Hungary	22.100
Bronze medal	Tatyana Konakova / Grigorii Shikhaleev	RGF	22.050
4	Antonio Papazov / Ana Maria Stoilova	Bulgaria	22.000
5	Lucas Barbosa / Tamires Silva	Brazil	21.800
6	Marcello Patteri / Anna Bullo	Italy	21.500
7	Maksym Buben / Anastasiia Isaienko	Ukraine	21.100
8	David Gavrilovici / Sarmiza Niculescu	Romania	20.250

=== Trios ===
Rank	Gymnast	Country	Score
Gold medal	Antonio Papazov / Darina Pashova / Tihomir Barotev	Bulgaria	22.877
Silver medal	Dániel Bali / Fanni Mazács / Balázs Farkas	Hungary	22.616
Bronze medal	Teodora Cucu / Daniel Ţavoc / David Gavrilovici	Romania	22.427
4	Dukhik Dzhanazian / Elena Ivanova / Anastasiia Ziubina	RGF	21.938
5	Gabriel Bocser / Sarmiza Niculescu / Mihai Alin Popa	Romania	21.933
6	Aleksei Germanov / Anton Kolobov / Petr Perminov	RGF	21.850
7	Stanislav Halaida / Anastasiia Kurashvili / Anastasiia Lytvyn	Ukraine	21.572
8	Erkut Ergin / Emir Erışık / Ayşe Begüm Onbaşı	Turkey	20.983

=== Group ===
Rank	Gymnast	Country	Score
Gold medal	Gabriel Bocser; Teodora Cucu; Daniel Ţavoc; David Gavrilovici; Mihai Alin Popa	Romania	22.583
Silver medal	Zoltán Lőcsei; Dániel Bali; Fanni Mazács; Balázs Farkas; Panna Szőllősi	Hungary	22.516
Bronze medal	Michela Castoldi; Davide Donati; Emanuele Caponera; Paolo Conti; Sara Natella	Italy	22.100
4	Ilia Ostapenko; Roman Semenov; Petr Perminov; Garsevan Dzhanazian; Timur Kulaev	RGF	21.850
5	Nea Kivelä; Fanny Samppa; Linn Agha; Erika Rautiainen; Jutta Nikander	Finland	21.388
6	Ana Rita Gomes; Inês Almeida; Rui Cansado; Carolina Santos; Maria Coutinho	Portugal	20.522
7	Anastasiia Lytvyn; Oleksandra Mokhort; Yuliia Samoilenko; Daria Subotina; Kateryna Cherkez	Ukraine	20.288
8	Vladimir Dolmatov; Imran Imranov; Balakhanim Ahmadova; Khoshgadam Guliyeva; Narmina Huseynova	Azerbaijan	20.166

=== Aerobic Step ===
Rank	Country	Score
Gold medal	RGF	17.700
Silver medal	Ukraine	17.200
Bronze medal	Italy	17.100

=== Aerobic Dance ===
Rank	Country	Score
Gold medal	Azerbaijan	18.400
Silver medal	RGF	18.000
Bronze medal	Hungary	17.800
4	Romania	17.700
5	Italy	17.500
6	Finland	17.250
7	Ukraine	17.150
8	Portugal	17.100

=== Team ===
Rank	Country	Points
1	RGF	13
2	Romania	16
3	Hungary	23
4	Italy	25
5	Ukraine	39
6	Portugal	50
