= Céleste Mordenti =

Luxembourgish artistic gymnast

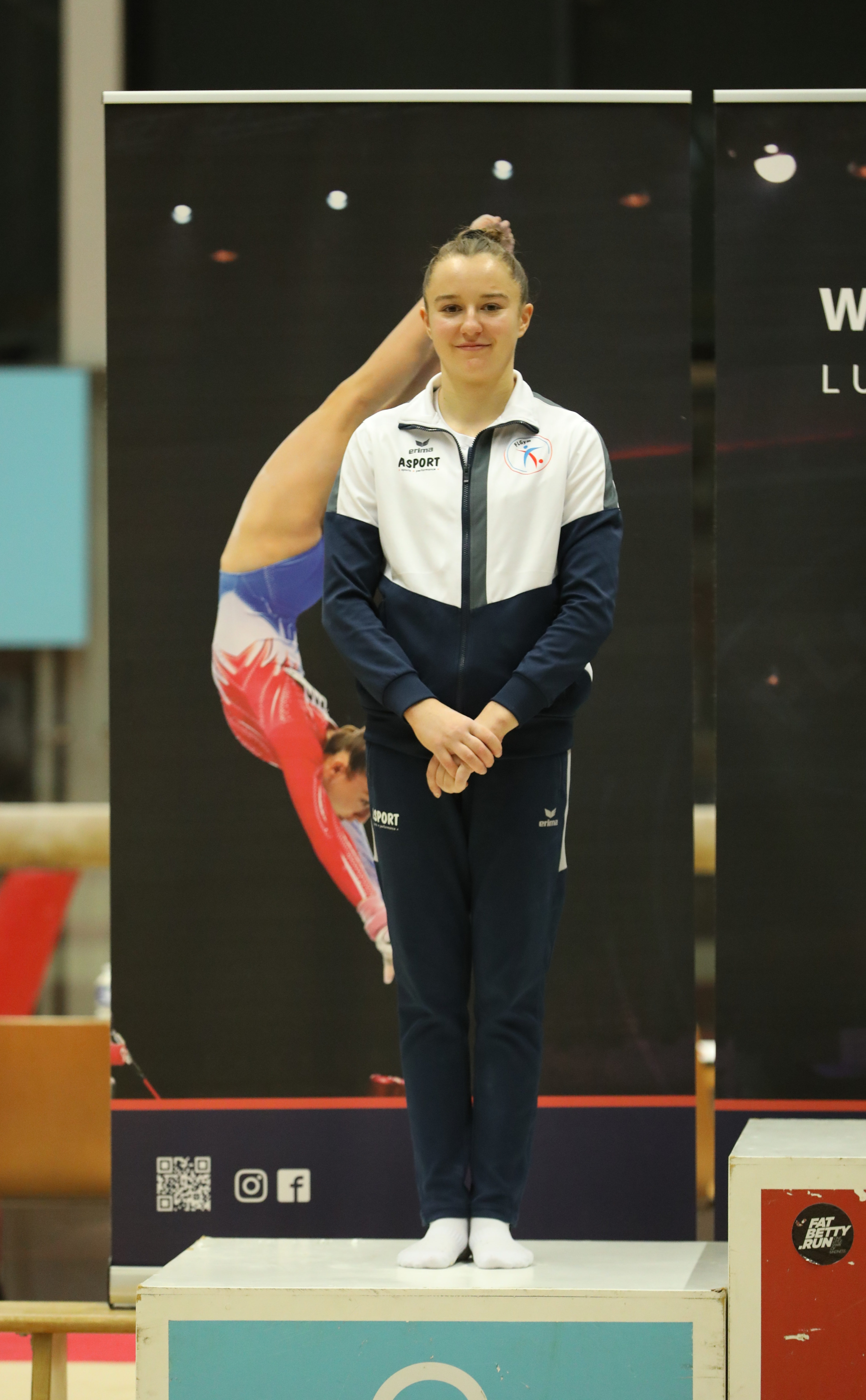
- Mordenti in 2023

Personal information
- Born: 25 January 2003 (age 23) Munich, Germany
- Height: 1.59 m (5 ft 3 in)

Gymnastics career
- Discipline: Women's artistic gymnastics
- Country represented: Luxembourg
- Club: Turnz Amsterdam
- Awards: Shooting Star Award (2025)
Medal record
Representing Luxembourg
FIG World Cup
Event	1st	2nd	3rd
World Challenge Cup	0	0	2

Céleste Mordenti (born 25 January 2003) is a Luxembourgish artistic gymnast. She represented Luxembourg at the 2019, 2021, 2022, and 2023 World Championships. She is the first gymnast from Luxembourg to win a medal in a FIG World Cup event.

== Early life ==
Mordenti was born in Munich, Germany, in 2003 to a German father and a French mother. When she was two years old, she moved to Luxembourg. After finishing high school, she moved to the Netherlands to attend Vrije Universiteit Amsterdam, where she is studying artificial intelligence.

== Gymnastics career ==
=== 2018–2019 ===
Mordenti competed at the 2018 European Championships where she helped the junior Luxembourg team finish 25th. She became age-eligible for senior level competition the following year and competed at the 2019 European Championships, finishing 58th in the all-around qualifications. Then at the 2019 European Games, she finished 29th in the all-around qualifications. She competed at her first World Championships and finished 137th in the all-around qualifications and did not earn a berth for the 2020 Summer Olympics.

=== 2020–2021 ===
Luxembourg was one of the countries that chose to compete at the 2020 European Championships, and Mordenti was the third reserve for the balance beam final. She then finished 53rd in the all-around qualifications at the 2021 European Championships. At the 2021 World Championships, she finished 34th in the all-around during qualifications, becoming the highest placing Luxembourgish gymnast in World Championships history.

=== 2022–2023 ===
Mordenti finished 66th in the all-around qualification round at the 2022 European Championships. Then at the 2022 World Championships, she finished 68th in the all-around qualifications. She won silver medals on the uneven bars and balance beam at the 2023 Luxembourg Open. She then placed seventh on the uneven bars at the 2023 Osijek World Challenge Cup and fifth on the uneven bars at the Mersin World Challenge Cup. At the 2023 World Championships, she finished 64th in the all-around qualifications and did not qualify for an Olympic berth.

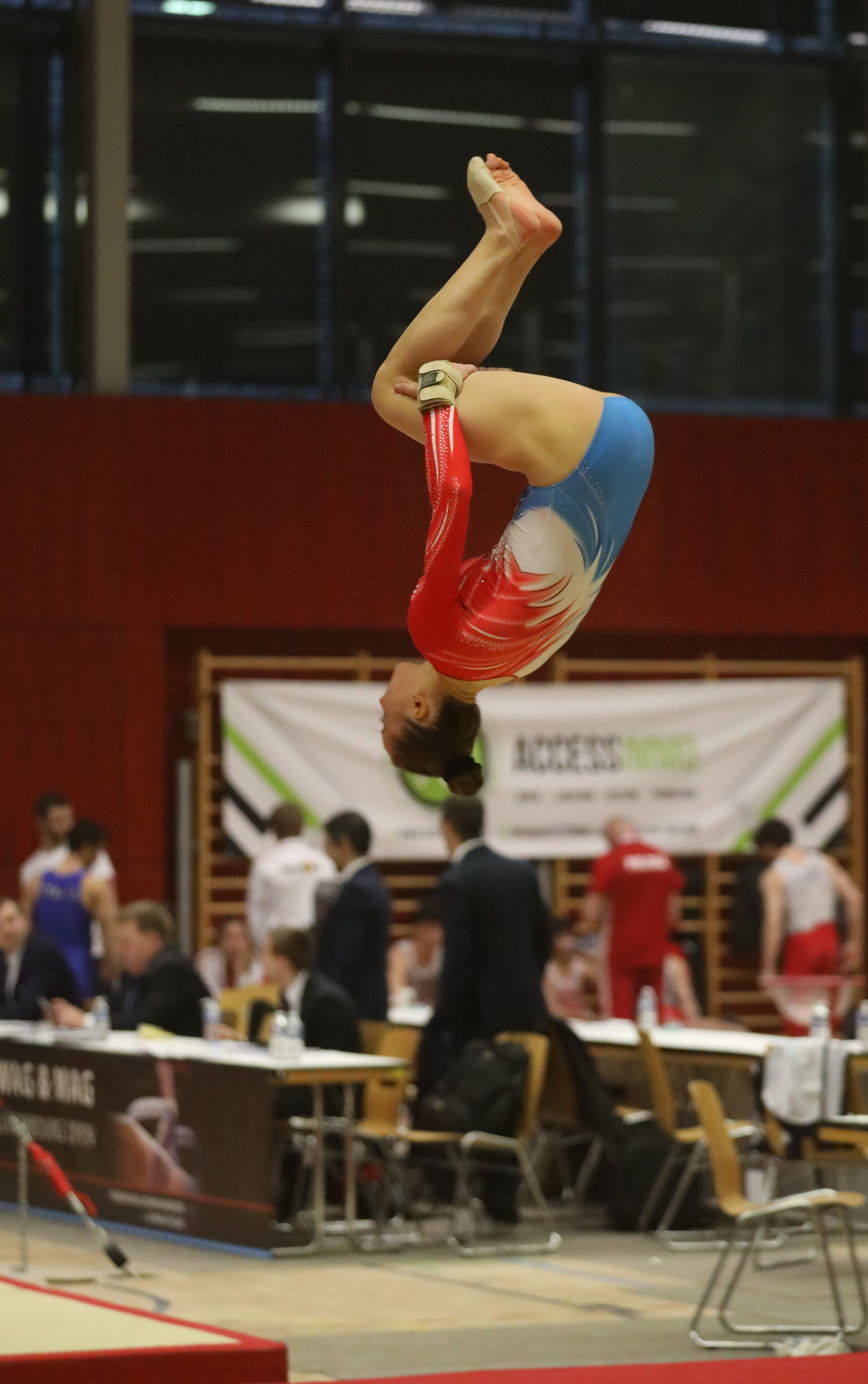
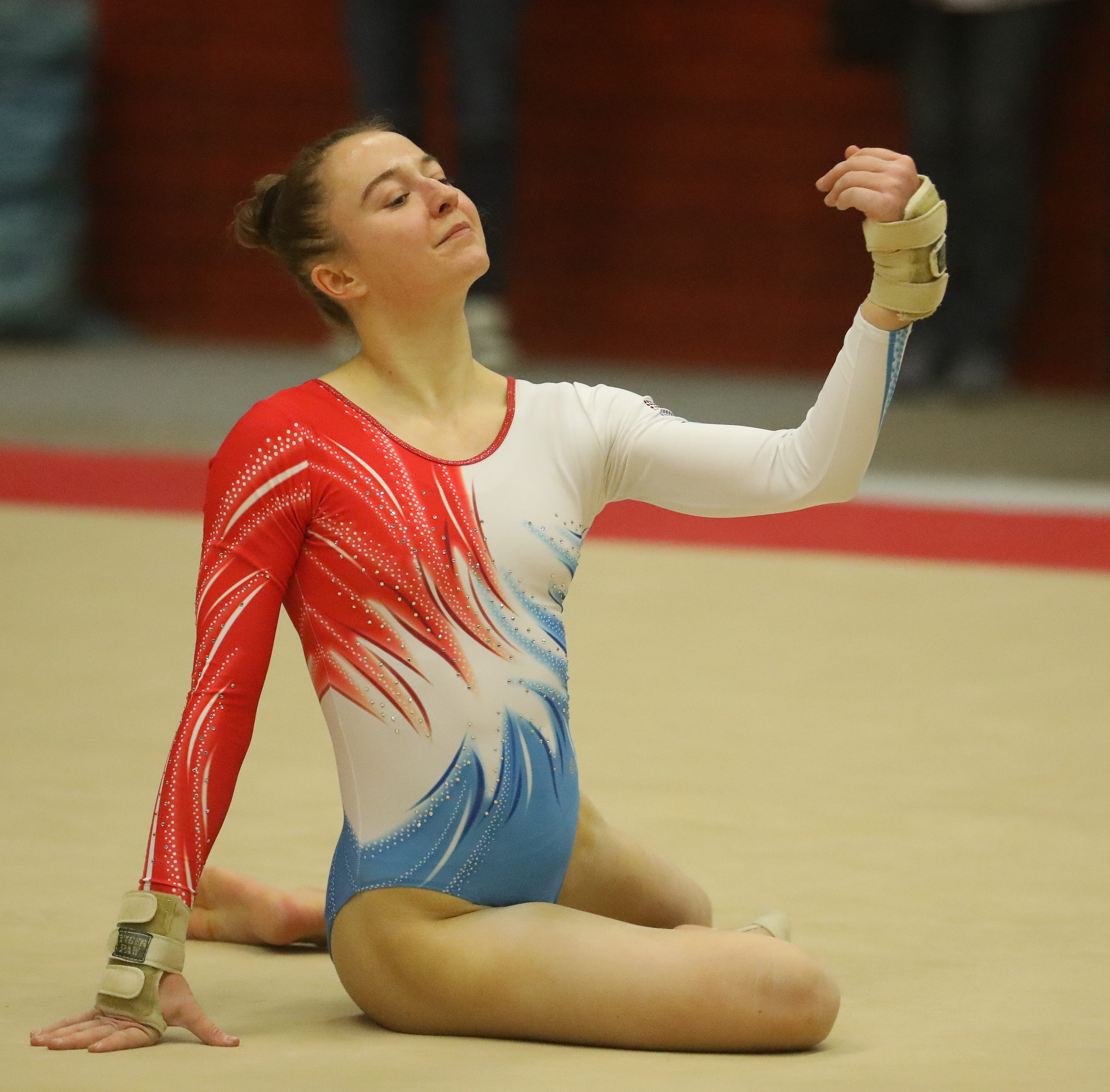
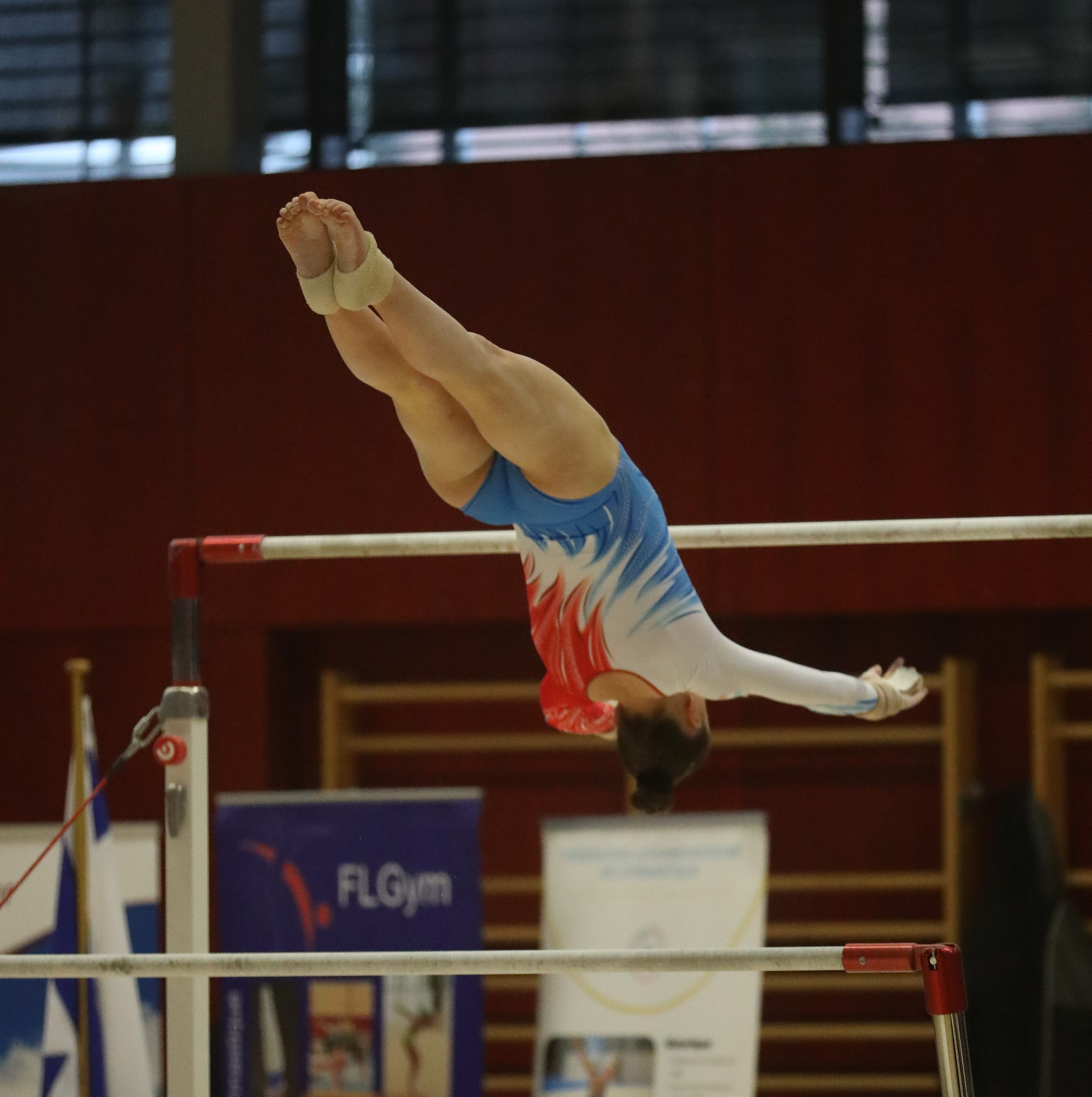
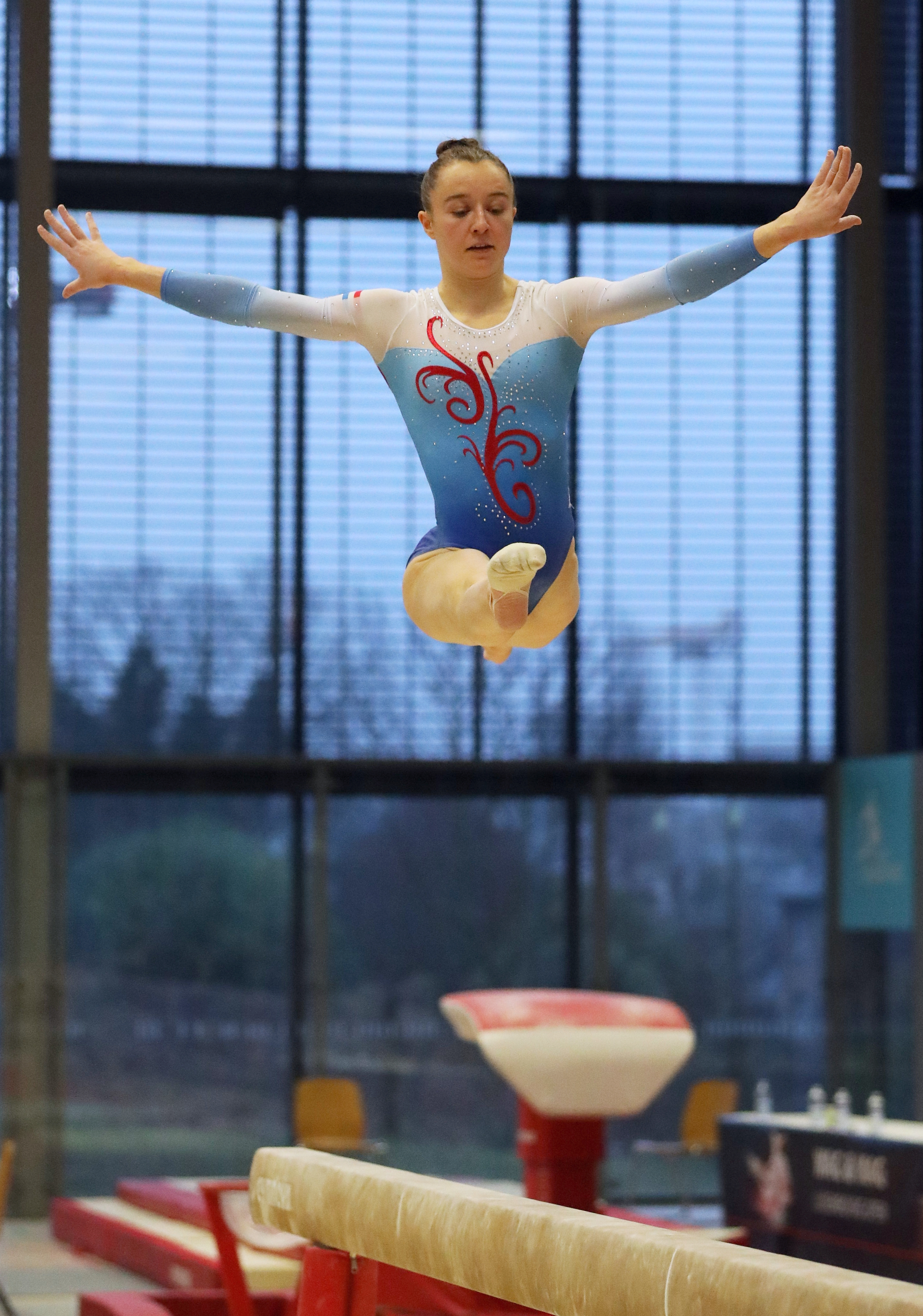
Mordenti at the 2023 Luxembourg Open

=== 2024 ===
Mordenti placed 27th in the all-around at the 2024 European Championships. She then competed at the Szombathely World Challenge Cup, where she won bronze on the uneven bars behind Charlotte Booth and Tonya Paulsson. In doing so, she became the first Luxembourgish gymnast to win a World Cup series medal.

=== 2025 ===
At the Varna World Challenge Cup Mordenti qualified to all four event finals. She won bronze on uneven bars behind Nola Matthews and Ruby Stacey. At the 2025 European Championships she finished thirty-first in the all-around during the qualification round. At this competition Mordenti, alongside Greek gymnast Eleftherios Petrounias, was awarded the SmartScoring Shooting Star Award, an award which is presented to "a gymnast with an exceptional story in the spotlight, someone who is an inspiration for the future generation of gymnasts and the general public alike". In both competitions, she performed a tucked salto backwards with two twists (720°) as a newly developed dismount from the balance beam. In being the first gymnast to successfully compete it in a major international competition, it was named the "Mordenti" after her by the International Gymnastics Federation in the Code of Points.

Prior to the Paris World Challenge Cup, Mordenti sustained a foot injury which also prevented her from competing at the 2025 World Championships.

== Eponymous skill ==
Mordenti has one skill named after her in the Code of Points.

Apparatus	Name	Description	Difficulty (Note: Valid for the 2025–2028 Code of Points)	Added to the Code of Points
Balance beam	Mordenti	Tucked double twist dismount	C (0.3)	2025 Varna World Challenge Cup

== Competitive History ==
Competitive history of Céleste Mordenti at the junior level
Year	Event	Team	AA	VT	UB	BB	FX
2017	Top Gym Tournament	6	38				
2018	Austrian Team Open	10	15				
2018	Junior European Championships	25	60				
2018	Gymnova Cup		10		6		

Competitive history of Céleste Mordenti at the senior level
Year	Event	Team	AA	VT	UB	BB	FX
2019
2019	European Championships		58				
2019	Luxembourg Championships		1st place, gold medalist(s)		1st place, gold medalist(s)	2nd place, silver medalist(s)	
2019	European Games		29				
2019	World Championships		137				
2020
2020	European Championships	R1				R3	
2021
2021	European Championships		53				
2021	World Championships		34				
2021	Gymnova Cup		10				
2022
2022	European Championships		66				
2022	World Championships		68				
2022	Gymnova Cup		4			8	
2023	Luxembourg Open		8		2nd place, silver medalist(s)	2nd place, silver medalist(s)	
2023	European Championships		61				
2023	Osijek World Challenge Cup				7		
2023	Dutch Championships		8				
2023	Mersin World Challenge Cup				5		
2023	World Championships		64				
2024	Luxembourg Open		1st place, gold medalist(s)	2nd place, silver medalist(s)	3rd place, bronze medalist(s)	3rd place, bronze medalist(s)	2nd place, silver medalist(s)
2024	European Championships		27				
2024	Dutch Championships		15	1st place, gold medalist(s)			
2024	Szombathely World Challenge Cup			6	3rd place, bronze medalist(s)		
2024	Christmas Cup					6	
2025	Luxembourg Open		1st place, gold medalist(s)	2nd place, silver medalist(s)	4	4	5
2025	Varna World Challenge Cup			7	3rd place, bronze medalist(s)	8	7
2025	European Championships		31				
2025	Dutch Championships		2nd place, silver medalist(s)	4	1st place, gold medalist(s)		6
2025	World University Games		11	4			
2026	Osijek World Cup				8		
2026	European Championships		28				
2026	Szombathely World Challenge Cup				5		
2026	World Championships		60				
