= 2016 Aerobic Gymnastics World Championships =

The 14th Aerobic Gymnastics World Championships took place in Incheon, South Korea from 17 to 19 June 2016. The 7th World Age Group Competitions were held at the same place between 13 and 15 June.

== Event ==
| Event | Gold | Silver | Bronze |
|---|---|---|---|
| Men's individual | Mizuki Saito (JPN) | Daniel Bali (HUN) | Ivan Veloz (MEX) |
| Women's individual | Oana Corina Constantin (ROU) | Yu Yangyang (CHN) | Aurelie Joly (FRA) |
| Mixed Pairs | Italy; Davide Donati; Michela Castoldi | Hungary; Daniel Bali; Dora Hegyi | China; Yu Yangyang; Hua Feiyang |
| Trios | South Korea; Kim Hanjin; Go Kyungmin; Ryu Jusun | Japan; Mizuki Saito; Takumi Kanai; Riri Kitazume | Russia; Roman Semenov; Ruslan Zubairov; Dukhik Dzhanazian |
| Groups | China; Ma Chao; Li Lingxiao; Pan Lixi; Xu Xuesong; MA Dong | Italy; Paolo Conti; Emanuele Caponera; Davide Donati; Sara Natella; Michela Castoldi | Romania; Gabriel Bocser; Lucian Savulescu; Dacian Barna; Bianca Maria Gorgovan; Lavinia Ioana Panaete |
| Step | France | China | Mongolia |
| Dance | South Korea | China | Russia |
| Team | China | Romania | South Korea |

== Results ==
=== Women's Individual ===
| Rank | Gymnast | Country | Score |
|---|---|---|---|
| Gold medal | Oana Corina Constantin | Romania | 22.050 |
| Silver medal | Yu Yangyang | China | 21.750 |
| Bronze medal | Aurelie Joly | France | 21.325 |
| 4 | Michela Castoldi | Italy | 21.050 |
| 5 | Daiana Nanzer | Argentina | 20.750 |
| 6 | Park Yeon Sun | South Korea | 20.700 |
| 7 | Sara Moreno | Spain | 20.700 |
| 8 | Dora Hegyi | Hungary | 20.700 |

=== Junior Women's Individual ===
| Rank | Gymnast | Country | Score |
|---|---|---|---|
| Gold medal | Ayşe Begüm Onbaşı | Turkey | 20.750 |
| Silver medal | Darina Pashova | Bulgaria | 20.400 |
| Bronze medal | Nu Thanh Thanh Ton | Vietnam | 20.150 |
| 4 | Nicole Kaloyanov | United States | 19.950 |
| 5 | Klaudia Bokonyi | Hungary | 19.750 |
| 6 | Aude Mendes | France | 19.650 |
| 7 | Mifu Kaneko | Japan | 19.500 |
| 8 | Maria Estefano | Spain | 19.050 |

=== Individual Men ===
| Rank | Gymnast | Country | Score |
|---|---|---|---|
| Gold medal | Mizuki Saito | Japan | 22.425 |
| Silver medal | Daniel Bali | Hungary | 22.300 |
| Bronze medal | Ivan Veloz | Mexico | 22.200 |
| 4 | Kyungmin Go | South Korea | 21.850 |
| 5 | Roman Semenov | Russia | 21.600 |
| 6 | Kim Hanjin | South Korea | 21.050 |
| 7 | Riccardo Pentassuglia | Italy | 20.850 |
| 8 | Maxime Decker-Breitel | France | 20.750 |

=== Junior Individual Men ===
| Rank | Gymnast | Country | Score |
|---|---|---|---|
| Gold medal | Che Thanh Nguyen | Vietnam | 20.800 |
| Silver medal | The Gia Hien Phan | Vietnam | 20.250 |
| Bronze medal | Tom Jourdan | France | 20.150 |
| 4 | Marcello Patteri | Italy | 20.050 |
| 5 | Davide Nacci | Italy | 20.025 |
| 6 | Petr Perminov | Russia | 19.950 |
| 7 | Sho Kawaii | Japan | 19.700 |
| 8 | Vicente Gironova | Spain | 18.550 |

=== Trio and Group ===
| Rank | Country | Score |
|---|---|---|
| Gold medal | Korea 2 | 21.750 |
| Silver medal | Japan | 21.638 |
| Bronze medal | Russia | 21.022 |
| 4 | Romania | 20.922 |
| 5 | Spain | 20.863 |
| 6 | China | 20.750 |
| 7 | Russia | 20.411 |
| 8 | France | 19.983 |

| Rank | Country | Score |
|---|---|---|
| Gold medal | China | 21.944 |
| Silver medal | Italy | 21.094 |
| Bronze medal | Romania | 20.994 |
| 4 | Hungary | 20.794 |
| 5 | France | 20.494 |
| 6 | Thailand | 20.475 |
| 7 | Russia | 20.405 |
| 8 | South Korea | 20.350 |
