= 2017 Aerobic Gymnastics European Championships =

The 10th Aerobic Gymnastics European Championships take place in Ancona, Italy from September 22 to 24, 2017. The competition took place at PalaRossini in Ancona.

== Participating nations ==
- Austria
- Azerbaijan
- Belarus
- Bulgaria
- Czech Republic
- Spain
- Finland
- France
- Great Britain
- Germany
- Greece
- Hungary
- Israel
- Italy
- Lithuania
- Portugal
- Romania
- Russia
- Switzerland
- Slovakia
- Turkey
- Ukraine

== Medalists ==
Event	Gold	Silver	Bronze
Seniors
Men's individual	Daniel Bali; Hungary	Pedro Cabanas; Spain	Roman Semenov; Russia
Women's individual	Belen Guillemot; Spain	Dora Hegyi; Hungary	Anastasiia Digtiareva; Russia
Mixed pairs	Spain; Sara Moreno; Vicente Lli	Hungary; Dora Hegyi; Daniel Bali	Romania; Andreea Bogati; Dacian Nicolae Barna
Trios	Romania	Russia	Romania
Groups	Romania	Russia	Hungary
Step	Russia	Hungary	Ukraine
Dance	Russia	Hungary	Romania
Team	Romania	Russia	Hungary
Juniors
Men's individual	Petr Perminov; Russia	Davide Nacci; Italy	David Gavrilovici; Romania
Women's individual	Ayşe Begüm Onbaşı; Turkey	Daria Tikhonova; Russia	Ekaterina Gridina; Russia
Mixed pairs	Russia	Turkey	Romania
Trios	Turkey	Italy	Hungary
Groups	Romania	Russia	France
Team	Russia	Romania	Italy

== Results ==
=== Seniors ===
==== Men's individual ====
Rank	Gymnast	Country	Score
Gold medal	Daniel Bali	Hungary	22.950
Silver medal	Pedro Cabanas	Spain	21.825
Bronze medal	Roman Semenov	Russia	21.825
4	Maxime Decker Breitel	France	21.700
5	Antonio Papazov	Bulgaria	21.400
6	Riccardo Pentassuglia	Italy	21.300
7	Vladimir Dolmatov	Azerbaijan	20.950
8	Lucian Stefan Savulescu	Romania	19.600

==== Women's individual ====
Rank	Gymnast	Country	Score
Gold medal	Belen Guillemot	Spain	21.150
Silver medal	Dora Hegyi	Hungary	21.000
Bronze medal	Anastasiia Degtiareva	Russia	20.900
4	Bianca Maria Gorgovan	Romania	20.850
5	Polina Amosenok	Russia	20.800
6	Lavinia Ioana Panaete	Romania	20.700
7	Ana Maria Stoilova	Bulgaria	20.650
8	Darina Pashova	Bulgaria	20.650

==== Mixed pairs ====
Rank	Gymnast	Country	Score
Gold medal			
Silver medal			
Bronze medal			
4			
5			
6			
7			
8			

==== Trios ====
Rank	Gymnast	Country	Score
Gold medal	Bogati Andreea, Brotei Marian, Bocser Gabriel	Romania	22,472
Silver medal	Solovev, Dzhanazian, Ostapenko	Russia	22,372
Bronze medal	Panaete Lavinia, Barna Dacian, Savulescu Lucian	Romania	22,244
4			
5			
6			
7			
8			

==== Groups ====
Rank	Gymnast	Country	Score
Gold medal			
Silver medal			
Bronze medal			
4			
5			
6			
7			
8			

==== Step ====
Rank	Gymnast	Country	Score
Gold medal			
Silver medal			
Bronze medal			
4			
5			
6			
7			
8			

==== Dance ====
Rank	Gymnast	Country	Score
Gold medal			
Silver medal			
Bronze medal			
4			
5			
6			
7			
8			

==== Team ====
Rank	Country	Men	Women	Mixed pair	Trio	Group	Total
Gold medal	Romania		4	3	3	1	11
Silver medal	Russia	2		5	1	3	11
Bronze medal	Hungary	1		2	7	2	12
4	Italy	5		4	5	5	19
5	Spain		2	1	17	8	28
6	Bulgaria		3	9	11	6	29
7	Ukraine		9	11	10	9	39
8	Portugal		13	10	13	11	47
9	Germany				9	13	22

=== Juniors ===
==== Men's individual ====
Rank	Gymnast	Country	Score
Gold medal	Petr Perminov	Russia	21.150
Silver medal	Davide Nacci	Italy	21.100
Bronze medal	David Gavrilovici	Romania	21.000
4	Timur Kulaev	Russia	20.800
5	Vicente Girona	Spain	20.550
6	Vicente Girona	Turkey	20.250
7	Rui Cansado	Portugal	20.150
8	Francesco Sebastio	Italy	19.800

==== Women's individual ====
Rank	Gymnast	Country	Score
Gold medal	Ayşe Begüm Onbaşı	Turkey	21.150
Silver medal	Daria Tikhonova	Russia	21.100
Bronze medal	Ekaterina Gridina	Russia	20.700
4	Francesca Morar	Romania	20.650
5	Enola Michard	France	20.550
6	Camilla Cubito	Italy	20.200
7	Dora Akoshegyi	Hungary	19.950
8	Ana Rita Gomes	Portugal	18.800

==== Mixed pairs ====
Rank	Gymnast	Country	Score
Gold medal			
Silver medal			
Bronze medal			
4			
5			
6			
7			
8			

==== Trios ====
Rank	Gymnast	Country	Score
Gold medal			
Silver medal			
Bronze medal			
4			
5			
6			
7			
8			

==== Groups ====
Rank	Gymnast	Country	Score
Gold medal			
Silver medal			
Bronze medal			
4			
5			
6			
7			
8			

==== Team ====
Rank	Country	Men	Women	Mixed pair	Trio	Group	Total
Gold medal	Russia		1	1	6	2	10
Silver medal	Romania	3		4	3	1	11
Bronze medal	Italy	1		6	2	3	12
4	Turkey		2	2	1	13	18
5	Spain	4		5	4	9	22
6	Ukraine	12		9	14	11	46
7	France		6		15	4	25
