= Nguyễn Chế Thanh =

Vietnamese gymnast (born 2000)

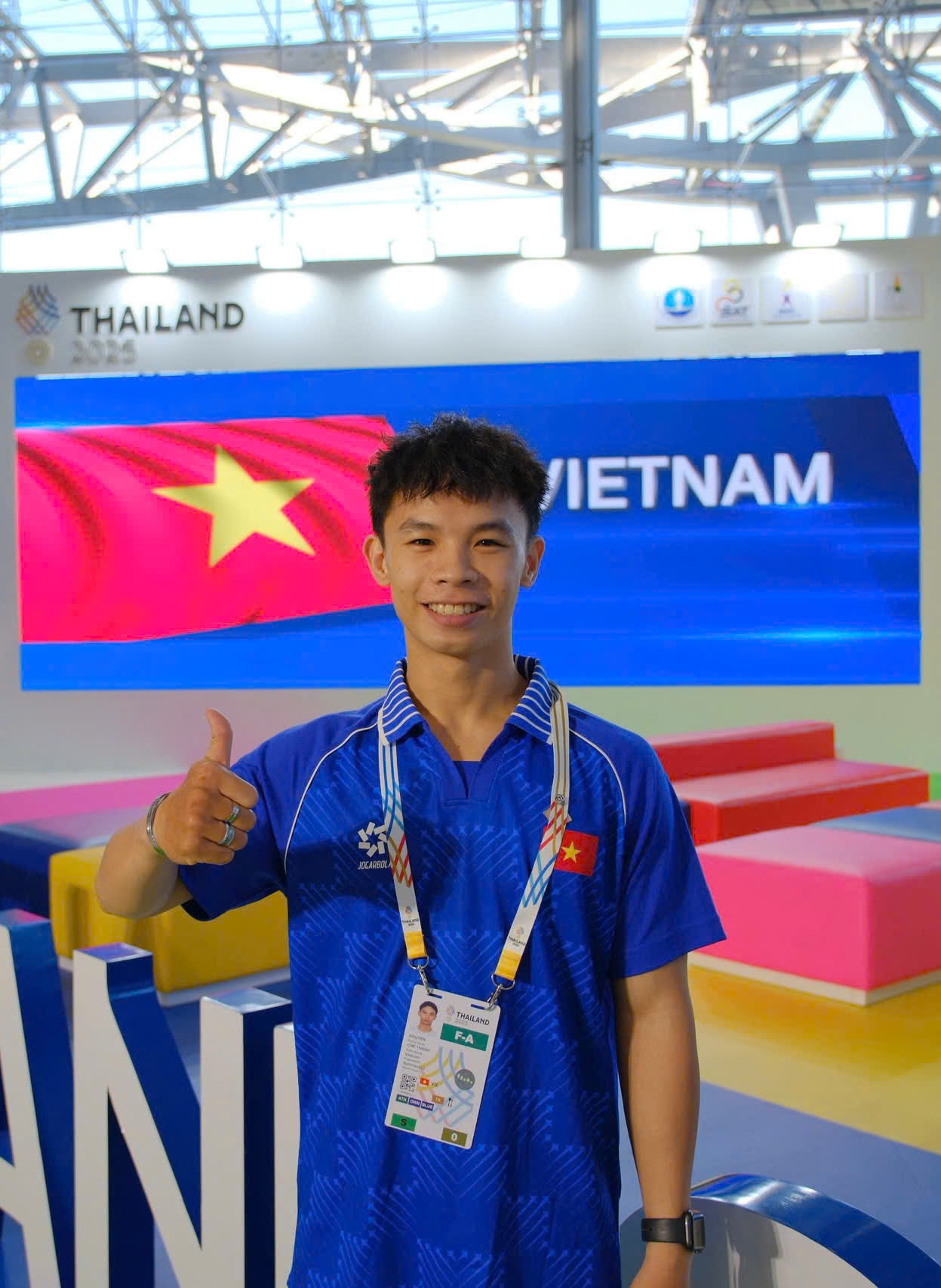
- SEA Games in 2025 in Thailand

Personal information
- Nationality: Vietnam
- Born: Nguyễn Chế Thanh; October 1, 2000 (age 25) Long An (present-day Tây Ninh), Vietnam
- Education: Ho Chi Minh City University of Education
- Occupation: Aerobic gymnastics athlete

Medal record

Aerobic gymnastics

Representing Vietnam

SEA Games
Gold medal – first place	2019 Philippines	Trio
Gold medal – first place	2022 Vietnam	Group and Trio
Gold medal – first place	2023 Cambodia	Group and Trio
Gold medal – first place	2025 Thailand	Group

Nguyễn Chế Thanh (born 1 October 2000) is a Vietnamese aerobic gymnastics athlete. A member of the Vietnam national team, he has won 6 gold medals at the SEA Games, 5 FIG World Cup gold medals, 3 Aerobic Gymnastics World Championships gold medals, and 11 Asian Gymnastics Championships gold medals.

== Biography ==
Nguyễn Chế Thanh was born in Long An province (now within the streamlined administrative boundaries following its merger with Tây Ninh province). When he was young, he and his family moved to Ho Chi Minh City, where he lived and pursued his education.

== Career ==
=== 2015 ===
At the 2015 Asian Aerobic Championships, held in Vietnam, Nguyễn Chế Thanh competed in the 15–17 age group. Together with his teammates Lê Hoàng Phong and Trần Ngọc Thúy Vi, he won the gold medal in the Trio event. He then won his second gold medal together with Lê Hoàng Phong, Trần Ngọc Thúy Vi, Tôn Nữ Thanh Thanh, and Đinh Hồng Ngọc in the Group of Five event. In the individual event, he also won a silver medal in the Men's Individual event.

=== 2016 ===
In 2016, at the World Championships held in South Korea, Nguyễn Chế Thanh and his peers in the 15–17 age group continued to win gold medals in the age-group category in both the Trio event (with Lê Hoàng Phong and Trần Ngọc Thúy Vi) and the Men's Individual event, while also adding a silver medal in the Group of Five event (with Lê Hoàng Phong, Trần Ngọc Thúy Vi, Tôn Nữ Thanh Thanh, and Đinh Hồng Ngọc).

=== 2017 ===
In 2017, Nguyễn Chế Thanh won Vietnam's only gold medal in the Men's Individual 15–17 event at the Suzuki Cup World Cup held in Japan, while also winning a silver medal in the 15–17 Trio event with Nguyễn Ngọc Anh Vy and Phạm Nhật Phương Trinh. At the Asian Championships that same year, he achieved a hat-trick of three gold medals in the 15–17 age group in the following events: Men's Individual, Trio (with Phạm Nhật Phương Trinh and Huỳnh Tiến Phước), and Group of Five (with Nguyễn Ngọc Anh Vy, Phạm Nhật Phương Trinh, Nguyễn Khánh Hưng, and Huỳnh Tiến Phước).

=== 2018–2019 ===
In 2018, Nguyễn Chế Thanh, together with veteran teammates Lê Hoàng Phong, Trần Ngọc Thúy Vi, Vương Hoài Ân, and Nguyễn Việt Anh, won the gold medal in the Group of Five event at the World Cup in Japan. The five-member team successfully defended their World Cup gold medal in 2019. Also in 2019, Nguyễn Chế Thanh competed at the SEA Games 30 in the Philippines, where he won the gold medal in the Trio event together with Vương Hoài Ân and Nguyễn Việt Anh.

=== 2022 ===
After two years (2020–2021) affected by the COVID-19 pandemic, during which he had to maintain training online, Nguyễn Chế Thanh competed at the SEA Games 31 held in Vietnam, winning a double gold in the Group of Five event (with Lê Hoàng Phong, Trần Ngọc Thúy Vi, Vương Hoài Ân, and Nguyễn Việt Anh) and the Trio event (with Lê Hoàng Phong and Trần Ngọc Thúy Vi). At the 2022 Asian Championships in Thailand, he continued to win two gold medals in the Trio event (with Lê Hoàng Phong and Trần Ngọc Thúy Vi) and the Group of Five event (with Hoàng Gia Bảo, Trương Ngọc Diễm Hằng, Vương Hoài Ân, and Nguyễn Việt Anh). At the 2022 World Championships (Aerobic Gymnastics World Championships) held in Guimarães, Portugal, he and teammates Lê Hoàng Phong, Trần Ngọc Thúy Vi, Vương Hoài Ân, and Nguyễn Việt Anh won the gold medal in the Group of Five event. At the same competition, he won a bronze medal in the Trio event (with Lê Hoàng Phong and Trần Ngọc Thúy Vi).

=== 2023 ===
In 2023, at the World Cup in Japan, Nguyễn Chế Thanh won a gold medal in the Group of Five event (with Lê Hoàng Phong, Trần Ngọc Thúy Vi, Vương Hoài Ân, and Nguyễn Việt Anh), a silver medal in the Trio event (with Lê Hoàng Phong and Hoàng Gia Bảo), and a bronze medal in the Men's Individual event. At the SEA Games 32 in Cambodia, he and his teammates won two gold medals in the Trio event (with Lê Hoàng Phong and Hoàng Gia Bảo) and the Group of Five event (with Lê Hoàng Phong, Trần Ngọc Thúy Vi, Vương Hoài Ân, and Nguyễn Việt Anh). At the 2023 Asian Championships in Mongolia, he won a gold medal in the Group of Five event (with Lê Hoàng Phong, Trần Ngọc Thúy Vi, Vương Hoài Ân, and Nguyễn Việt Anh), a silver medal in the Aerobic Dance event (with Lê Hoàng Phong, Trần Ngọc Thúy Vi, Vương Hoài Ân, Nguyễn Việt Anh, Hoàng Gia Bảo, Trương Ngọc Diễm Hằng, and Trần Phạm Huyền Linh), and a bronze medal in the Trio event (with Hoàng Gia Bảo and Trần Phạm Huyền Linh).

=== 2024 ===
In 2024, Nguyễn Chế Thanh competed at the World Cup in Japan, where he and Lê Hoàng Phong, Trần Ngọc Thúy Vi, Vương Hoài Ân, and Nguyễn Việt Anh won the gold medal in the Group of Five event. Later, at the 2024 Asian Championships, Nguyễn Chế Thanh achieved a hat-trick of three gold medals in the same competition across all three events in which he competed: Men's Individual, Trio (with Lê Hoàng Phong and Trần Ngọc Thúy Vi), and Group of Five (with Lê Hoàng Phong, Trần Ngọc Thúy Vi, Vương Hoài Ân, and Nguyễn Việt Anh). He won a silver medal in the Group of Five event at the 2024 World Championships, together with the same core team of Lê Hoàng Phong, Trần Ngọc Thúy Vi, Vương Hoài Ân, and Nguyễn Việt Anh.

=== 2025 ===
In 2025, at the SEA Games 33, Nguyễn Chế Thanh and his new teammates Hoàng Gia Bảo, Trương Ngọc Diễm Hằng, Phan Thị Uyên Nhi, and Đặng Chí Bảo won the gold medal in the Group of Five event.

=== 2026 ===
In April 2026, at the World Cup held in Japan (Suzuki World Cup 2026), Nguyễn Chế Thanh, together with Hoàng Gia Bảo and Phan Thị Uyên Nhi, won the bronze medal in the Trio event.

== Selected achievements ==
=== Sport ===
Nguyễn Chế Thanh's sporting achievements
Year	Competition	Host	Result	Source
2015	Asian Aerobic Championships	Vietnam	2 Gold medals	
2015	Asian Aerobic Championships	Vietnam	Silver medal	
2016	World Aerobic Championships	South Korea	2 Gold medals	
2016	World Aerobic Championships	South Korea	Silver medal	
2017	Asian Aerobic Championships	Mongolia	3 Gold medals	
2017	Suzuki World Cup	Japan	Gold medal	
2017	Suzuki World Cup	Japan	Silver medal	
2018	Suzuki World Cup	Japan	Gold medal	
2019	2019 Southeast Asian Games	Philippines	Gold medal	
2019	Suzuki World Cup	Japan	World Cup title	
2022	2021 Southeast Asian Games	Vietnam	2 Gold medals	
2022	Asian Aerobic Championships	Thailand	2 Gold medals	
2022	World Aerobic Championships	Portugal	Gold medal	
2022	World Aerobic Championships	Portugal	Bronze medal	
2023	2023 Southeast Asian Games	Cambodia	2 Gold medals	
2023	Asian Aerobic Championships	Mongolia	Gold medal	
2023	Asian Aerobic Championships	Mongolia	Silver medal	
2023	Asian Aerobic Championships	Mongolia	Bronze medal	
2023	Suzuki World Cup	Japan	Gold medal	
2023	Suzuki World Cup	Japan	Silver medal	
2023	Suzuki World Cup	Japan	Bronze medal	
2024	Asian Aerobic Championships	Vietnam	3 Gold medals	
2024	Suzuki World Cup	Japan	Gold medal	
2024	World Aerobic Championships	Italy	Silver medal	
2025	2025 Southeast Asian Games	Thailand	Gold medal	
2026	Suzuki World Cup	Japan	Bronze medal	
