= 2021 Aerobic Gymnastics European Championships =

- Venue: Vitrifrigo Arena
- Location: Pesaro, Italy
- Dates: 17–19 September 2021
- Competitors: 325 from 22 nations

The 12th Aerobic Gymnastics European Championships took place in Pesaro, Italy from September 17 to 19, 2021.

== Medals ==
=== Medal table ===
* Host nation (Italy)

Rank	Nation	Gold	Silver	Bronze	Total
1	Bulgaria (BUL)	4	0	0	4
2	Russia (RUS)	3	5	2	10
3	Romania (ROU)	2	5	4	11
4	Hungary (HUN)	2	1	4	7
5	Italy (ITA)*	2	1	3	6
6	France (FRA)	1	0	0	1
7	Great Britain (GBR)	0	1	1	2
8	Portugal (POR)	0	1	0	1
Totals (8 entries)		14	14	14	42

=== Medalists ===
Event	Gold	Silver	Bronze
Seniors
Men's individual	Daniel Bali; Hungary	Roman Semenov; Russia	Davide Nacci; Italy
Women's individual	Darina Pashova; Bulgaria	Tatyana Konakova; Russia	Teodora Cucu; Romania
Mixed pair	Bulgaria; Antonio Papazov; Ana Maria Stoilova	Hungary; Fanni Mazacs; Daniel Bali	Italy; Anna Bullo; Marcello Patteri
Trio	Bulgaria; Tihomir Barotev; Antonio Papazov; Darina Pashova	Romania; Teodora Cucu; David Gavrilovici; Daniel Tavoc	Russia; Aleksei Germanov; Anton Kolobov; Petr Perminov
Group	Romania; Gabriel Bocser; David Gavrilovici; Teodora Cucu; Mihai Alin Popa; Daniel Tavoc	Italy; Anna Bullo; Sara Cutini; Davide Nacci; Marcello Patteri; Francesco Sebastio	Hungary; Daniel Bali; Balazs Farkas; Zoltan Locsei; Fanni Mazacs; Panna Szollosi
Aerobic dance	Hungary; Balazs Farkas; Kata Hajdu; Kamilla Goda; Zoltan Locsei; Janka Oekroes; Vanessza Ruzicska; Zsofia Simon; Panna Szollosi	Russia; Garsevan Dzhanazian; Aleksei Zhuravlev; Dmitrii Kudriavtsev; Artem Markelov; Ivan Basov; Ilia Ostapenko; Aleksei Germanov; Anton Kolobov	Romania; Maria Bianca Becze; Sandra Dinca; Sarmiza Niculescu; Roberta Plesa; Alina Radu; Flavia Sentea; Selena Sotanga; Steliana Stoenescu
Team	Italy	Romania	Hungary
Juniors
Men's individual	Andrea Colnago; Italy	Danila Kudinov; Russia	Kirill Klimov; Russia
Women's individual	Maëlys Lenclos; France	Lola Lawrence; Great Britain	Lucrezia Rexhepi; Italy
Mixed pair}	Bulgaria; Borislava Ivanova; Hristo Manolov	Portugal; Tania Almeida; Luis Rosas	Romania; Darius Branda; Daria Mihaiu
Trio	Russia; Polina Kakkoeva; Elizaveta Shevchenko; Polina Popova	Romania; Madalin Boldea; Vladut Popa; Vlad Siminea	Romania; Claudia Gheorghe; Leonard Manta; Claudia Ristea
Group	Russia; Polina Kakkoeva; Varvara Zybina; Vladlena Shipaeva; Angelina Starkina; Polina Popova	Romania; Darius Branda; Claudia Gheorghe; Leonard Manta; Daria Mihaiu; Vlad Siminea	Great Britain; Lola Lawrence; Molly Brown; Freya Grafton; Katie Ferris; Emily Blackhurst
Aerobic dance	Romania; Darius Branda; Madalin Boldea; Mirela Frincu; Daria Mihaiu; Larisa Suiu; Vladut Popa	Russia; Kirill Ziablitsev; Mariia Permiakova; Valeriia Tikunova; Viktoriia Kariakina; Ekaterina Kiliakova; Anna Rusakova	Hungary; Ilona Goergenyl; Renata Gyoergy; Greta Balogh; Vivien Kovacs; Livia Reka Szilagyi; Janka Szuecs
Team	Russia	Romania	Hungary
