= 2023 Aerobic Gymnastics European Championships =

The 13th Aerobic Gymnastics European Championships took place in Antalya, Turkey from November 17 to 19, 2023.

== Medals summary ==
=== Medalists ===
Event	Gold	Silver	Bronze
Men's individual	Davide Nacci (ITA)	Francesco Sebastio (ITA)	Miquel Mañé (ESP)
Women's individual	Maëlys Lenclos (FRA)	Anastasiia Kurashvili (UKR)	Borislava Ivanova (BUL)
Mixed pair	Bulgaria; Borislava Ivanova; Hristo Manolov	Italy; Lucrezia Rexhepi; Matteo Falera	Romania; Darius Branda; Daria Mihaiu
Trio	France; Clara Lestruhaut; Maelys Lenclos; Victoria Trosset	Romania; David Gavrilovici; Leonard Manta; Claudia Ristea	Italy; Sara Cutini; Davide Nacci; Francesco Sebastio
Group	Italy; Sara Cutini; Matteo Falera; Davide Nacci; Francesco Sebastio; Anna Bullo	Finland; Nea Hukkanen; Nea Kivelä; Adeelia Koponen; Hilda Laaksonen; Nanne Teinikivi	Hungary; Dora Akoshegyi; Fanni Csitkovics; Fruzsina Fejer; Zoltan Locsei; Andras Agoston Mikulecz
Dance	Hungary; Kamilla Goda; Fanni Csitkovics; Fruzsina Fejer; Vivien Kovacs; Zoltán Lőcsei; Anna Makranszki; Andras Agoston Mikulecz; Vanessza Ruzicska	Romania; David Gavrilovici; Madalin Boldea; Claudia Ristea; Sandra Dincă; Daria Mihaiu; Vlăduț Popa; Larisa Suiu; Antonio Surdu	Italy; Arianna Ciurlanti; Andrea Colnago; Matteo Falera; Alice Pettinari; Lucrezia Rexhepi; Nicole Alighieri; Gaia Laurino; Sofia Cavalleri
Team	Italy	Romania	Ukraine

=== Medal standings ===
* Host nation (Turkey)

Rank	Nation	Gold	Silver	Bronze	Total
1	Italy (ITA)	3	2	2	7
2	France (FRA)	2	0	0	2
3	Bulgaria (BUL)	1	0	1	2
3	Hungary (HUN)	1	0	1	2
5	Romania (ROU)	0	3	1	4
6	Ukraine (UKR)	0	1	1	2
7	Finland (FIN)	0	1	0	1
8	Spain (ESP)	0	0	1	1
Totals (8 entries)		7	7	7	21
