= 2019 Aerobic Gymnastics European Championships =

The 11th Aerobic Gymnastics European Championships took place in Baku, Azerbaijan from May 24 to 26, 2019.

== Medals summary ==
=== Medalists ===
Event	Gold	Silver	Bronze
Men's individual	Roman Semenov (RUS)	Timur Kulaev (RUS)	Antonio Papazov (BUL)
Women's individual	Ekaterina Pykhtova (RUS)	Tatyana Konakova (RUS)	Darina Pashova (BUL)
Mixed pair	Hungary	Turkey	Romania
Trio	Hungary	Russia	Romania
Group	Romania	Bulgaria	Russia
Dance	Azerbaijan	Russia	Romania
Team	Russia	Romania	Hungary

=== Medal standings ===
* Host nation (Azerbaijan)

Rank	Nation	Gold	Silver	Bronze	Total
1	Russia (RUS)	3	4	1	8
2	Hungary (HUN)	2	0	1	3
3	Romania (ROU)	1	1	3	5
4	Azerbaijan (AZE)*	1	0	0	1
5	Bulgaria (BUL)	0	1	2	3
6	Turkey (TUR)	0	1	0	1
Totals (6 entries)		7	7	7	21
