= Aerobic Gymnastics European Championships =

Sporting competition

- Status: active
- Genre: sporting event
- Date: mid-year
- Frequency: biennial
- Country: varying
- Inaugurated: 1999

The Aerobic Gymnastics European Championships are the European Championships for aerobic gymnastics. They have been organized by the European Union of Gymnastics since 1999 and are held every two years.

== Background ==
Aerobic Gymnastics is a competitive discipline combining elements of traditional aerobics with gymnastic difficulty, strength and artistry. Routines are performed to music and judged on multiple criteria including execution and difficulty, with categories such as Individual, Mixed Pairs, Trios, Groups and Aerobic Dance contested at major championships.

== Championships ==
Edition	Year	Host city	Host country	Events
1	1999	Birmingham	Great Britain	5
2	2001	Zaragoza	Spain	5
3	2003	Debrecen	Hungary	5
4	2005	Coimbra	Portugal	5
5	2007	Szombathely	Hungary	5
6	2009	Liberec	Czech Republic	5
7	2011	Bucharest	Romania	5
8	2013	Arques	France	8
9	2015	Elvas	Portugal	8
10	2017	Ancona	Italy	8
11	2019	Baku	Azerbaijan	7
12	2021	Pesaro	Italy	7
13	2023	Antalya	Turkey	7
14	2025	Ganja	Azerbaijan	7

== Medal table ==
- Last updated after the 2023 Aerobic Gymnastics European Championships (includes junior and senior results)

Rank	Country	Gold	Silver	Bronze	Overall
1	Romania	33	21	24	79
2	Russia	19	22	14	55
3	Italy	11	13	15	39
4	France	9	10	14	33
5	Spain	9	9	7	25
6	Hungary	8	12	15	34
7	Bulgaria	8	2	5	15
8	Turkey	2	2	1	5
9	Finland	1	3	1	5
10	Portugal	1	1	1	3
11	Azerbaijan	1	0	0	1
12	Ukraine	0	1	3	4
13	Iceland	0	1	1	2
14	United Kingdom	0	1	1	2
15	Austria	0	1	0	1
Total		103	100	91	304
