= 2018 Aerobic Gymnastics World Championships =

15th Aerobic Gymnastics World Championships
- Location: Guimarães, Portugal
- Start date: 1 June 2018
- End date: 3 June 2018

The 15th Aerobic Gymnastics World Championships took place in Guimarães, Portugal from 1 to 3 June 2018. The 8th World Age Group Competitions were held at the same place between 25 and 27 May.

== Medal summary ==
Event	Gold	Silver	Bronze
Men's individual	Mizuki Saito (JPN)	Daniel Bali (HUN)	Ivan Veloz (MEX)
Women's individual	Riri Kitazume (JPN)	Anastasiia Ziubina (RUS)	Anna Bullo (ITA)
Mixed Pairs	Italy Davide Donatti - Michela Castoldi	Romania	Hungary
Trios	Russia	China	China
Groups	China	Romania	Russia
Step	Russia	China	Ukraine
Dance	South Korea	China	Romania
Team	Russia	South Korea	Romania

== Results ==
=== Women's Individual ===
Rank	Gymnast	Country	Score
Gold medal	Riri Kitazume	Japan	22.000
Silver medal	Anastasia Ziubina	Russia	21.450
Bronze medal	Anna Bullo	Italy	21.000
4	Belen Guillemot	Spain	20.850
5	Michela Castoldi	Italy	20.800
6	Ana Maria Stoilova	Bulgaria	20.800
7	Darina Pashova	Bulgaria	20.550
8	Park Yeon Sun	South Korea	19.200
