= Aerobic Gymnastics World Championships =

World Championships for aerobic gymnastics

- Status: active
- Genre: sporting event
- Date: mid-year
- Frequency: biennial
- Country: varying
- Inaugurated: 1995

The Aerobic Gymnastics World Championships are the World Championships for aerobic gymnastics. They have been held since 1995.

== Championships ==
=== Senior ===
Year	Number	Host city	Host country	Events	First of the Medal Table	Second in the Medal Table	Third in the Medal Table
1995	1	Paris	France	4	Brazil	Spain	Australia; France; Romania; Russia
1996	2	The Hague	Netherlands	4	Brazil	South Korea	Spain; Romania
1997	3	Perth	Australia	4	Bulgaria	Romania	Australia; South Korea
1998	4	Catania	Italy	4	Russia	Hungary; Japan; Spain	—N/a
1999	5	Hanover	Germany	4	South Korea	Brazil; Japan; Russia	—N/a
2000	6	Riesa	Germany	4	Romania	Russia	Spain
2002	7	Klaipėda	Lithuania	5	Spain	Romania; Russia	—N/a
2004	8	Sofia	Bulgaria	5	Romania	Brazil; Bulgaria; France; New Zealand	—N/a
2006	9	Nanjing	China	5	China	Romania	Brazil
2008	10	Ulm	Germany	5	Romania	France	China
2010	11	Rodez	France	6	Romania	France	China
2012	12	Sofia	Bulgaria	8	China	Spain	Romania
2014	13	Cancun	Mexico	8	Romania	France	China
2016	14	Incheon	South Korea	8	China	South Korea	Romania
2018	15	Guimarães	Portugal	8	Russia	Japan	China
2021	16	Baku	Azerbaijan	8	RGF	Bulgaria	Italy
2022	17	Guimarães	Portugal	8	Hungary	South Korea	Ukraine
2024	18	Pesaro	Italy	8	China	Japan	Italy
2026	19	Pamplona	Spain	8	Russia	China	South Korea

== All-time medal table ==
- Last updated after the 2026 Aerobic Gymnastics World Championships; results include team competition events.

Rank	Nation	Gold	Silver	Bronze	Total
1	Romania	18	22	22	62
2	China	16	14	12	42
3	Spain	14	3	4	21
4	Russia	12	7	13	32
5	South Korea	12	7	8	27
6	Brazil	9	4	5	18
7	Japan	8	3	0	11
8	Hungary	6	9	7	22
9	France	5	15	11	31
10	Italy	4	8	10	22
11	Bulgaria	3	6	2	11
12	Russian Gymnastics Federation (Note: At the 2021 edition, gymnasts from Russia represented the Russian Gymnastics Federation (RGF).)	2	2	2	6
13	Ukraine	1	4	2	7
14	Australia	1	2	2	5
15	Azerbaijan	1	2	0	3
16	Vietnam	1	1	2	4
17	Turkey	1	1	0	2
18	Mexico	1	0	2	3
18	New Zealand	1	0	2	3
20	Austria	1	0	1	2
21	Mongolia	0	0	2	2
21	Sweden	0	0	2	2
23	Chile	0	0	1	1
23	Finland	0	0	1	1
23	Greece	0	0	1	1
23	Iceland	0	0	1	1
Totals (26 entries)		117	110	115	342

=== Age Group ===
FIG Aerobic Gymnastics World Age Group Competitions :

Year	Edition	Host city	Country	Events
2004	1	Sofia	Bulgaria	
2006	2	Nanjing	China	
2008	3	Ulm	Germany	
2010	4	Rodez	France	
2012	5	Sofia	Bulgaria	
2014	6	Cancun	Mexico	
2016	7	Incheon	South Korea	
2018	8	Guimaraes	Portugal	
2021	9	Baku	Azerbaijan	
