= Gymnastics World Championships =

World championships

Gymnastics World Championships refers to a number of different world championships for each of the disciplines in competitive gymnastics. World Gymnastics (formerly the International Gymnastics Federation or FIG) organizes World Championships for six disciplines: acrobatic gymnastics, aerobic gymnastics, artistic gymnastics, parkour, rhythmic gymnastics, as well as trampoline and tumbling. The International Federation of Aesthetic Group Gymnastics (IFAGG) organizes World Championships for the sport of aesthetic group gymnastics.

== List of championships ==
Number	Discipline	Competition	First held	Current frequency	Most gold medals
Organizer: FIG
1	Artistic gymnastics	Artistic Gymnastics World Championships	1903	Annually; Except when the Summer Olympics are held	Soviet Union
2	Rhythmic gymnastics	Rhythmic Gymnastics World Championships	1963	Annually; Except when the Summer Olympics are held	Russia
3	Trampoline gymnastics	Trampoline Gymnastics World Championships	1964	Annually; Except when the Summer Olympics are held	Russia
4	Acrobatic gymnastics	Acrobatic Gymnastics World Championships	1974	Even years	Soviet Union
5	Aerobic gymnastics	Aerobic Gymnastics World Championships	1995	Even years	Romania
6	Parkour	Parkour World Championships	2022	Even years	Mexico; Sweden
Organizer: IFAGG
7	Aesthetic group gymnastics	World Aesthetic Group Gymnastics Championships	2000	Annually	Finland

== FIG ==
=== Artistic Gymnastics World Championships ===
Year	Edition	Host city	Country	Events (male/female)	First in the Medal Table
1903	1	Antwerp	Belgium	6 / 0	France
1905	2	Bordeaux	France	5 / 0	France
1907	3	Prague	Austria-Hungary	5 / 0	Bohemia
1909	4	Luxembourg	Luxembourg	5 / 0	France
1911	5	Turin	Italy	6 / 0	Bohemia
1913	6	Paris	France	6 / 0	Italy
1922	7	Ljubljana	Yugoslavia	6 / 0	Yugoslavia
1926	8	Lyon	France	6 / 0	Czechoslovakia
1930	9	Luxembourg	Luxembourg	7 / 0	Yugoslavia
1934	10	Budapest	Hungary	8 / 2	Switzerland
1938	11	Prague	Czechoslovakia	8 / 6	Czechoslovakia
1950	12	Basel	Switzerland	8 / 6	Switzerland
1954	13	Rome	Italy	8 / 6	Soviet Union
1958	14	Moscow	Soviet Union	8 / 6	Soviet Union
1962	15	Prague	Czechoslovakia	8 / 6	Soviet Union
1966	16	Dortmund	West Germany	8 / 6	Soviet Union
1970	17	Ljubljana	SFR Yugoslavia	8 / 6	Japan
1974	18	Varna	Bulgaria	8 / 6	Soviet Union
1978	19	Strasbourg	France	8 / 6	Soviet Union
1979	20	Fort Worth	United States	8 / 6	Soviet Union
1981	21	Moscow	Soviet Union	8 / 6	Soviet Union
1983	22	Budapest	Hungary	8 / 6	Soviet Union
1985	23	Montreal	Canada	8 / 6	Soviet Union
1987	24	Rotterdam	Netherlands	8 / 6	Soviet Union
1989	25	Stuttgart	West Germany	8 / 6	Soviet Union
1991	26	Indianapolis	United States	8 / 6	Soviet Union
1992	27	Paris	France	6 / 4	CIS
1993	28	Birmingham	Great Britain	7 / 5	Belarus
1994	29	Brisbane	Australia	7 / 5	Belarus
1994	30	Dortmund	Germany	1 / 1	China; Romania
1995	31	Sabae	Japan	8 / 6	China
1996	32	San Juan	Puerto Rico	6 / 4	Russia
1997	33	Lausanne	Switzerland	8 / 6	Romania
1999	34	Tianjin	China	8 / 6	Russia
2001	35	Ghent	Belgium	8 / 6	Romania
2002	36	Debrecen	Hungary	6 / 4	Romania
2003	37	Anaheim	United States	8 / 6	China
2005	38	Melbourne	Australia	7 / 5	United States
2006	39	Aarhus	Denmark	8 / 6	China
2007	40	Stuttgart	Germany	8 / 6	China
2009	41	London	Great Britain	7 / 5	China
2010	42	Rotterdam	Netherlands	8 / 6	China
2011	43	Tokyo	Japan	8 / 6	China
2013	44	Antwerp	Belgium	7 / 5	Japan
2014	45	Nanning	China	8 / 6	United States
2015	46	Glasgow	Great Britain	8 / 6	United States
2017	47	Montreal	Canada	7 / 5	China
2018	48	Doha	Qatar	8 / 6	United States
2019	49	Stuttgart	Germany	8 / 6	United States
2021	50	Kitakyushu	Japan	7 / 5	China
2022	51	Liverpool	Great Britain	8 / 6	United States
2023	52	Antwerp	Belgium	8 / 6	United States
2025	53	Jakarta	Indonesia	7 / 5	China
2026	54	Rotterdam	Netherlands	8 / 6	United States
2027	55	Chengdu	China	8 / 6	Future event

=== Rhythmic Gymnastics World Championships ===
Year	Edition	Host city	Country	Events (female)	First in the Medal Table
1963	1	Budapest	Hungary	3	Soviet Union
1965	2	Prague	Czechoslovakia	3	Czechoslovakia
1967	3	Copenhagen	Denmark	5	Soviet Union
1969	4	Varna	Bulgaria	6	Bulgaria
1971	5	Havana	Cuba	6	Bulgaria
1973	6	Rotterdam	Netherlands	6	Soviet Union
1975	7	Madrid	Spain	6	West Germany
1977	8	Basel	Switzerland	6	Soviet Union
1979	9	London	Great Britain	6	Soviet Union
1981	10	Munich	West Germany	6	Bulgaria
1983	11	Strasbourg	France	6	Bulgaria
1985	12	Valladolid	Spain	6	Bulgaria
1987	13	Varna	Bulgaria	8	Bulgaria
1989	14	Sarajevo	Yugoslavia	9	Soviet Union
1991	15	Athens	Greece	9	Soviet Union
1992	16	Brussels	Belgium	8	Russia
1993	17	Alicante	Spain	7	Bulgaria
1994	18	Paris	France	8	Ukraine
1995	19	Vienna	Austria	9	Bulgaria
1996	20	Budapest	Hungary	7	Ukraine
1997	21	Berlin	Germany	6	Ukraine
1998	22	Sevilla	Spain	3	Belarus
1999	23	Osaka	Japan	9	Russia
2001	24	Madrid	Spain	6	Ukraine
2002	25	New Orleans	United States	3	Russia
2003	26	Budapest	Hungary	9	Russia
2005	27	Baku	Azerbaijan	9	Russia
2007	28	Patras	Greece	9	Russia
2009	29	Mie	Japan	9	Russia
2010	30	Moscow	Russia	9	Russia
2011	31	Montpellier	France	9	Russia
2013	32	Kyiv	Ukraine	8	Russia
2014	33	İzmir	Turkey	9	Russia
2015	34	Stuttgart	Germany	9	Russia
2017	35	Pesaro	Italy	8	Russia
2018	36	Sofia	Bulgaria	9	Russia
2019	37	Baku	Azerbaijan	9	Russia
2021	38	Kitakyushu	Japan	9	Russian Gymnastics Federation
2022	39	Sofia	Bulgaria	9	Italy
2023	40	Valencia	Spain	9	Germany
2025	41	Rio de Janeiro	Brazil	9	Germany
2026	42	Frankfurt	Germany	9	Germany
2027	43	Baku	Azerbaijan	9	Future event

=== Trampoline Gymnastics World Championships ===
Year	Edition	Host city	Country	Events (male/female/mixed)	First in the Medal Table
1964	1	London	Great Britain	1 / 1 / 0	United States
1965	2	London	Great Britain	2 / 2 / 1	United States
1966	3	Lafayette	United States	3 / 3 / 0	United States
1967	4	London	Great Britain	2 / 2 / 0	United States
1968	5	Amersfoort	Netherlands	2 / 2 / 0	United States
1970	6	Bern	Switzerland	2 / 2 / 0	United States
1972	7	Stuttgart	West Germany	2 / 2 / 0	United States
1974	8	Johannesburg	South Africa	2 / 2 / 0	United States
1976	9	Tulsa	United States	4 / 4 / 0	United States
1978	10	Newcastle	Australia	4 / 4 / 0	United States
1980	11	Brig	Switzerland	4 / 4 / 0	United States
1982	12	Bozeman	United States	7 / 7 / 0	United States
1984	13	Osaka	Japan	7 / 7 / 0	United States
1986	14	Paris	France	7 / 7 / 0	Soviet Union
1988	15	Birmingham	United States	7 / 7 / 0	Soviet Union
1990	16	Essen	West Germany	7 / 7 / 0	Soviet Union
1992	17	Auckland	New Zealand	7 / 7 / 0	Russia
1994	18	Porto	Portugal	7 / 7 / 0	Russia
1996	19	Vancouver	Canada	7 / 7 / 0	United States
1998	20	Sydney	Australia	7 / 7 / 0	Russia
1999	21	Sun City	South Africa	7 / 7 / 0	Russia
2001	22	Odense	Denmark	7 / 7 / 0	Russia
2003	23	Hannover	Germany	7 / 7 / 0	Russia
2005	24	Eindhoven	Netherlands	7 / 7 / 0	Russia
2007	25	Quebec	Canada	7 / 7 / 0	Russia
2009	26	Saint Petersburg	Russia	7 / 7 / 0	China
2010	27	Metz	France	4 / 4 / 0	China
2011	28	Birmingham	Great Britain	7 / 7 / 0	China
2013	29	Sofia	Bulgaria	7 / 7 / 0	China
2014	30	Daytona Beach	United States	4 / 4 / 0	China
2015	31	Odense	Denmark	7 / 7 / 0	China
2017	32	Sofia	Bulgaria	7 / 7 / 0	China
2018	33	Saint Petersburg	Russia	4 / 4 / 1	China
2019	34	Tokyo	Japan	7 / 7 / 1	Russia
2021	35	Baku	Azerbaijan	7 / 7 / 1	Russian Gymnastics Federation
2022	36	Sofia	Bulgaria	7 / 7 / 1	Great Britain
2023	37	Birmingham	Great Britain	7 / 7 / 1	United States
2025	38	Pamplona	Spain	7 / 7 / 2	China
2026	39	Nanjing	China	7 / 7 / 2	Russia
2027	40	Sofia	Bulgaria	7 / 7 / 2	Future event

=== Acrobatic Gymnastics World Championships ===
Year	Edition	Host city	Country	Events (male/female/mixed)	First in the Medal Table
1974	1	Moscow	Soviet Union	9 / 9 / 3	Soviet Union
1976	2	Saarbrücken	West Germany	12 / 12 / 3	Soviet Union
1978	3	Sofia	Bulgaria	9 / 9 / 3	Soviet Union
1980	4	Poznań	Poland	9 / 9 / 3	Soviet Union
1982	5	London	Great Britain	9 / 9 / 3	Soviet Union
1984	6	Sofia	Bulgaria	9 / 9 / 3	Soviet Union
1986	7	Rennes	France	9 / 9 / 3	Soviet Union
1988	8	Antwerp	Belgium	9 / 9 / 3	Bulgaria
1990	9	Augsburg	West Germany	9 / 9 / 3	Soviet Union
1992	10	Rennes	France	9 / 9 / 3	Russia
1994	11	Beijing	China	9 / 9 / 3	China
1995	12	Wrocław	Poland	9 / 9 / 3	Russia
1996	13	Riesa	Germany	9 / 9 / 3	China
1997	14	Manchester	Great Britain	9 / 9 / 3	Russia
1998	15	Minsk	Belarus	9 / 9 / 3	Russia
1999	16	Ghent	Belgium	6 / 6 / 3	Russia
2000	17	Wrocław	Poland	6 / 6 / 3	Russia
2002	18	Riesa	Germany	2 / 2 / 1	Russia
2004	19	Lievin	France	2 / 2 / 1	Russia
2006	20	Coimbra	Portugal	2 / 2 / 1	Russia
2008	21	Glasgow	Great Britain	2 / 2 / 1	Russia
2010	22	Wrocław	Poland	2 / 2 / 1	Great Britain
2012	23	Lake Buena Vista	United States	2 / 2 / 1	Russia
2014	24	Levallois-Perret	France	2 / 2 / 1	Russia
2016	25	Putian	China	2 / 2 / 2	Russia
2018	26	Antwerp	Belgium	2 / 2 / 2	Russia
2021	27	Geneva	Switzerland	2 / 2 / 2	Russian Gymnastics Federation
2022	28	Baku	Azerbaijan	6 / 6 / 4	Belgium
2024	29	Guimarães	Portugal	6 / 6 / 4	Belgium
2026	30	Pesaro	Italy	6 / 6 / 4	Israel

=== Aerobic Gymnastics World Championships ===
Year	Edition	Host city	Country	Events (male/female/mixed)	First in the Medal Table
1995	1	Paris	France	1 / 1 / 2	Brazil
1996	2	The Hague	Netherlands	1 / 1 / 2	Brazil
1997	3	Perth	Australia	1 / 1 / 2	Bulgaria
1998	4	Catania	Italy	1 / 1 / 2	Russia
1999	5	Hanover	Germany	1 / 1 / 2	South Korea
2000	6	Riesa	Germany	1 / 1 / 2	Romania
2002	7	Klaipėda	Lithuania	1 / 1 / 3	Spain
2004	8	Sofia	Bulgaria	1 / 1 / 3	Romania
2006	9	Nanjing	China	1 / 1 / 3	China
2008	10	Ulm	Germany	1 / 1 / 3	Romania
2010	11	Rodez	France	1 / 1 / 4	Romania
2012	12	Sofia	Bulgaria	1 / 1 / 6	China
2014	13	Cancún	Mexico	1 / 1 / 6	Romania
2016	14	Incheon	South Korea	1 / 1 / 6	China
2018	15	Guimarães	Portugal	1 / 1 / 6	Russia
2021	16	Baku	Azerbaijan	1 / 1 / 6	Russian Gymnastics Federation
2022	17	Guimarães	Portugal	1 / 1 / 6	Hungary
2024	18	Pesaro	Italy	1 / 1 / 6	China
2026	19	Pamplona	Spain	1 / 1 / 6	

=== Parkour World Championships ===
Year	Edition	Host city	Country	Events (male/female)	First in the Medal Table
2022	1	Tokyo	Japan	2 / 2	Greece; Mexico; Sweden; Ukraine
2024	2	Kitakyushu	Japan	2 / 2	Mexico

== IFAGG ==
=== World Aesthetic Group Gymnastics Championships ===
Year	Edition	Host city	Country	Events (female)	First in the Medal Table
2000	1	Helsinki	Finland	1	Finland
2001	2	Tallinn	Estonia	1	Estonia
2002	3	Prague	Czech Republic	1	Finland
2003	4	Graz	Austria	1	Finland
2004	5	Sofia	Bulgaria	1	Finland
2005	6	Copenhagen	Denmark	1	Russia
2006	7	Tampere	Finland	1	Finland
2007	8	Salou	Spain	1	Estonia
2008	9	Toronto	Canada	1	Finland
2009	10	Moscow	Russia	1	Finland
2010	11	Varna	Bulgaria	1	Finland
2011	12	Tartu	Estonia	1	Russia
2012	13	Cartagena	Spain	1	Russia
2013	14	Lahti	Finland	1	Russia
2014	15	Moscow	Russia	1	Russia
2015	16	Tórshavn	Denmark	1	Finland
2016	17	Brno	Czech Republic	1	Russia
2017	18	Helsinki	Finland	1	Finland
2018	19	Budapest	Hungary	1	Russia
2019	20	Cartagena	Spain	1	Russia
2021	21	Helsinki	Finland	1	Finland
2022	22	Graz	Austria	1	Bulgaria
2023	23	Astana	Kazakhstan	1	IFAGG
2024	24	Tartu	Estonia	1	Finland
2025	25	Burgas	Bulgaria	1	Finland
2026	26	Kyoto	Japan	1	
2027	27	Paris	France	1	

== All-time medal table (FIG disciplines) ==
Last updated on November 9, 2025. Next championships: 2026 Rhythmic Gymnastics World Championships, August 12–16, 2026.

		Acrobatic			Aerobic			Artistic			Parkour			Rhythmic			Trampoline			Combined			
Rk.	Nation	1st place, gold medalist(s)	2nd place, silver medalist(s)	3rd place, bronze medalist(s)	1st place, gold medalist(s)	2nd place, silver medalist(s)	3rd place, bronze medalist(s)	1st place, gold medalist(s)	2nd place, silver medalist(s)	3rd place, bronze medalist(s)	1st place, gold medalist(s)	2nd place, silver medalist(s)	3rd place, bronze medalist(s)	1st place, gold medalist(s)	2nd place, silver medalist(s)	3rd place, bronze medalist(s)	1st place, gold medalist(s)	2nd place, silver medalist(s)	3rd place, bronze medalist(s)	1st place, gold medalist(s)	2nd place, silver medalist(s)	3rd place, bronze medalist(s)	Total
1	Russia; Soviet Union (1954–1991); CIS (1992); RGF (2021); AIN2 (2025)	105; 146; 0; 5; 0	53; 51; 0; 0; 0	25; 10; 0; 1; 0	9; 0; 0; 2; 0	6; 0; 0; 2; 0	12; 0; 0; 2; 0	36; 111; 5; 1; 2	43; 86; 3; 1; 1	36; 59; 5; 2; 1	0; 0; 0; 0; 0	0; 0; 0; 0; 0	0; 0; 0; 0; 0	113; 50; 0; 7; 0	57; 43; 0; 4; 0	35; 27; 0; 2; 0	76; 25; 0; 5; 1	42; 13; 0; 1; 4	43; 9; 0; 3; 1	699	410	273	1,382
2	China	81	68	74	14	13	11	95	61	51	1	1	0	2	3	3	61	34	12	254	180	151	585
3	United States	5	11	26	0	0	0	68	56	49	0	1	1	0	1	0	79	76	58	152	145	134	431
4	Bulgaria	57	80	79	3	6	2	5	6	13	0	0	0	70	65	55	1	2	2	136	159	151	446
5	Japan	0	0	0	8	3	0	57	61	73	0	2	0	3	6	6	13	13	14	81	85	93	259
6	Germany (and West Germany); East Germany (1950–1990)	6; 0	2; 0	23; 0	0; 0	0; 0	0; 0	9; 17	16; 13	17; 29	0; 0	0; 0	0; 0	16; 0	9; 1	2; 3	21; 0	33; 0	36; 0	69	74	110	253
7	Ukraine	24	35	45	1	3	2	7	13	20	1	0	0	26	28	42	7	12	12	66	91	121	278
8	Romania	0	0	0	18	22	21	48	45	42	0	0	0	0	1	1	0	0	0	66	68	64	198
9	France	3	5	3	5	15	11	25	30	27	0	0	1	0	0	2	23	30	32	56	80	76	212
10	Great Britain; England (1964–1965); Wales (1965); Scotland (1982)	15; 0; 0; 0	19; 0; 0; 0	31; 0; 0; 0	0; 0; 0; 0	0; 0; 0; 0	0; 0; 0; 0	11; 0; 0; 0	14; 0; 0; 0	14; 0; 0; 0	0; 0; 0; 0	0; 0; 0; 0	0; 0; 0; 0	0; 0; 0; 0	0; 0; 0; 0	0; 0; 0; 0	28; 0; 0; 0	42; 2; 0; 1	40; 3; 1; 0	54	78	89	221
11	Czech Republic; Bohemia (1907–1913); Czechoslovakia (1922–1992)	0; 0; 0	0; 0; 0	0; 0; 0	0; 0; 0	0; 0; 0	0; 0; 0	0; 10; 34	0; 8; 29	0; 10; 20	0; 0; 0	0; 0; 0	2; 0; 0	0; 0; 4	0; 0; 5	0; 0; 8	0; 0; 0	0; 0; 0	0; 0; 0	48	42	40	130
12	Belarus; AIN1 (2025)	3; 0	11; 0	23; 0	0; 0	0; 0	0; 0	14; 0	7; 0	11; 0	0; 0	0; 0	0; 0	10; 0	28; 0	41; 0	11; 3	21; 1	20; 0	41	68	95	204
13	Italy	0	0	0	4	5	9	15	12	29	0	2	1	17	24	16	0	0	0	36	43	55	134
14	Spain	0	1	0	13	3	2	3	3	2	0	1	0	7	12	24	3	5	5	26	25	33	84
15	Switzerland	0	0	0	0	0	0	19	16	16	1	0	0	0	0	0	2	4	5	22	20	21	63
16	Brazil	0	0	0	9	4	5	9	9	9	0	0	0	2	2	1	2	1	2	22	16	17	55
17	Poland	15	48	69	0	0	0	5	2	9	0	0	0	0	0	0	1	5	12	21	55	90	166
18	Australia	0	1	0	1	2	2	2	4	4	0	0	0	0	0	0	17	18	21	20	25	27	72
19	Canada	0	0	0	0	0	0	0	8	6	0	0	0	0	0	0	17	27	36	17	35	42	94
20	Portugal	5	6	1	0	0	0	0	0	0	0	0	0	0	0	0	12	14	15	17	20	16	53
		Acrobatic			Aerobic			Artistic			Parkour			Rhythmic			Trampoline			Combined			
Rk.	Nation	1st place, gold medalist(s)	2nd place, silver medalist(s)	3rd place, bronze medalist(s)	1st place, gold medalist(s)	2nd place, silver medalist(s)	3rd place, bronze medalist(s)	1st place, gold medalist(s)	2nd place, silver medalist(s)	3rd place, bronze medalist(s)	1st place, gold medalist(s)	2nd place, silver medalist(s)	3rd place, bronze medalist(s)	1st place, gold medalist(s)	2nd place, silver medalist(s)	3rd place, bronze medalist(s)	1st place, gold medalist(s)	2nd place, silver medalist(s)	3rd place, bronze medalist(s)	1st place, gold medalist(s)	2nd place, silver medalist(s)	3rd place, bronze medalist(s)	Total
21	Serbia; Austria-Hungary (1909–1913); Yugoslavia (1922–1938); Yugoslavia (1950–1992)	0; 0; 0; 0	0; 0; 0; 1	0; 0; 0; 5	0; 0; 0; 0	0; 0; 0; 0	0; 0; 0; 0	0; 0; 13; 4	0; 1; 10; 1	0; 1; 6; 2	0; 0; 0; 0	0; 0; 0; 0	0; 0; 0; 0	0; 0; 0; 0	0; 0; 0; 0	0; 0; 0; 0	0; 0; 0; 0	0; 0; 0; 0	0; 0; 0; 0	17	13	14	44
22	South Korea	0	0	0	11	6	7	6	2	4	0	0	0	0	0	1	0	0	0	17	8	12	37
23	Hungary	0	1	6	5	9	7	11	15	8	0	0	0	0	0	2	0	0	0	16	25	23	64
24	Belgium	14	10	5	0	0	0	2	4	6	0	0	0	0	0	0	0	3	6	16	17	17	50
25	Greece	0	0	0	0	0	0	7	3	2	1	0	0	3	1	2	0	0	0	11	4	4	19
26	New Zealand	0	0	0	1	0	2	0	0	0	0	0	0	0	0	0	9	5	1	10	5	3	18
27	North Korea	0	2	3	0	0	0	8	3	3	0	0	0	1	2	4	0	0	0	9	7	10	26
28	Azerbaijan	4	3	7	1	1	0	0	0	1	0	0	0	0	1	8	3	1	1	8	6	17	31
29	Sweden	0	0	0	0	0	2	3	1	2	2	0	1	0	0	0	3	1	2	8	2	7	17
30	Netherlands	0	0	0	0	0	0	5	8	3	0	0	2	0	0	0	1	2	3	6	10	8	24
31	Israel	1	12	7	0	0	0	1	2	3	0	0	0	2	9	8	0	0	0	4	23	18	45
32	South Africa	0	1	0	0	0	0	0	0	0	0	0	0	0	0	0	3	8	17	3	9	17	29
33	Slovenia	0	0	0	0	0	0	3	4	0	0	0	0	0	0	2	0	0	0	3	4	2	9
34	Turkey	0	0	0	1	1	0	2	2	0	0	0	0	0	0	0	0	0	0	3	3	0	6
35	Mexico	0	0	0	1	0	2	0	1	1	2	1	0	0	0	0	0	0	2	3	2	5	10
36	Philippines	0	0	0	0	0	0	3	2	3	0	0	0	0	0	0	0	0	0	3	2	3	8
37	Kazakhstan	1	5	6	0	0	0	1	0	1	0	0	0	0	0	0	0	0	0	2	5	7	14
38	Finland	0	0	0	0	0	1	2	5	2	0	0	0	0	0	0	0	0	0	2	5	3	10
39	Austria	0	0	1	1	0	1	1	1	1	0	0	0	0	0	0	0	0	0	2	1	3	6
40	Ireland	0	0	0	0	0	0	2	0	1	0	0	0	0	0	0	0	0	0	2	0	1	3
		Acrobatic			Aerobic			Artistic			Parkour			Rhythmic			Trampoline			Combined			
Rk.	Nation	1st place, gold medalist(s)	2nd place, silver medalist(s)	3rd place, bronze medalist(s)	1st place, gold medalist(s)	2nd place, silver medalist(s)	3rd place, bronze medalist(s)	1st place, gold medalist(s)	2nd place, silver medalist(s)	3rd place, bronze medalist(s)	1st place, gold medalist(s)	2nd place, silver medalist(s)	3rd place, bronze medalist(s)	1st place, gold medalist(s)	2nd place, silver medalist(s)	3rd place, bronze medalist(s)	1st place, gold medalist(s)	2nd place, silver medalist(s)	3rd place, bronze medalist(s)	1st place, gold medalist(s)	2nd place, silver medalist(s)	3rd place, bronze medalist(s)	Total
41	Croatia	0	0	0	0	0	0	1	3	1	0	0	0	0	0	0	0	0	0	1	3	1	5
42	Uzbekistan	0	0	0	0	0	0	1	2	3	0	0	0	0	0	0	0	0	1	1	2	4	7
43	Armenia	0	0	0	0	0	0	1	2	2	0	0	0	0	0	0	0	0	0	1	2	2	5
44	Algeria	0	0	0	0	0	0	1	2	0	0	0	0	0	0	0	0	0	0	1	2	0	3
45	Vietnam	0	0	0	1	1	2	0	0	1	0	0	0	0	0	0	0	0	0	1	1	3	5
46	Luxembourg	0	0	0	0	0	0	1	0	4	0	0	0	0	0	0	0	0	0	1	0	4	5
47	Denmark	0	0	0	0	0	0	0	0	0	0	0	0	0	0	0	0	4	7	0	4	7	11
48	Cuba	0	0	0	0	0	0	0	2	3	0	0	0	0	0	0	0	0	0	0	2	3	5
49	Chinese Taipei	0	0	0	0	0	0	0	2	1	0	0	0	0	0	0	0	0	0	0	2	1	3
49	Latvia	0	0	0	0	0	0	0	2	1	0	0	0	0	0	0	0	0	0	0	2	1	3
51	Lithuania	0	1	3	0	0	0	0	0	0	0	0	0	0	0	0	0	0	0	0	1	3	4
52	Argentina	0	0	0	0	0	0	0	0	0	0	0	0	0	0	0	0	1	1	0	1	1	2
52	Jordan	0	0	0	0	0	0	0	1	1	0	0	0	0	0	0	0	0	0	0	1	1	2
54	Mongolia	0	0	0	0	0	2	0	0	0	0	0	0	0	0	0	0	0	0	0	0	2	2
55	Chile	0	0	0	0	0	1	0	0	0	0	0	0	0	0	0	0	0	0	0	0	1	1
55	Georgia	0	0	0	0	0	0	0	0	0	0	0	0	0	0	0	0	0	1	0	0	1	1
55	Iceland	0	0	0	0	0	1	0	0	0	0	0	0	0	0	0	0	0	0	0	0	1	1
55	Puerto Rico	0	0	0	0	0	0	0	0	1	0	0	0	0	0	0	0	0	0	0	0	1	1
55	Slovakia	0	0	0	0	0	0	0	0	0	0	0	0	0	0	0	0	0	1	0	0	1	1
–	Unattached athlete^{(1)}	0	0	0	0	0	0	0	0	1	0	0	0	0	0	0	0	0	0	0	0	1	1

Notes
(1) At the 1993 World Artistic Gymnastics Championships, Valery Belenky earned a bronze medal competing as an unattached (UNA) athlete. Later, official documents from the International Gymnastics Federation credit his medal as a medal for Germany.

== See also ==
- Gymnastics at the Summer Olympics
- Gymnastics at the Youth Olympic Games
- Gymnastics at the World Games
- Junior World Gymnastics Championships
- Major achievements in gymnastics by nation
