= Junior World Gymnastics Championships =

Number of different World Championships

Junior World Gymnastics Championships refers to a number of different World Championships in four disciplines recognized by World Gymnastics (formerly the International Gymnastics Federation or FIG) in competitive gymnastics: acrobatic gymnastics, men's and women's artistic gymnastics, parkour, and rhythmic gymnastics.

== History ==
Before merging with FIG in 1999, the International Federation of Sports Acrobatics (IFSA) organized and promoted World Junior Championships in acrobatic gymnastics from 1989 to 1999. As of 2019, FIG has organized junior world championships in artistic and rhythmic gymnastics.

Currently, FIG organizes periodical World Age Group competitions in aerobic gymnastics, acrobatic gymnastics and trampoline. The former governing body for trampoline, the International Trampoline Federation (FIT), incorporated into the FIG in 1998, also organized World Age Groups competitions from 1973 to 1996. These competitions, however, are not considered world championships.

== Acrobatic ==
Format:

- 1989–1999: Junior World Championships
- 2001–2002: World Age Group Games
- 2004–2006: International Age Group Competition
- 2008–: World Age Group Competition

Edition	Year	Host city	Host country	Events
Junior
1	1989	Katowice	Poland	21
2	1991	Beijing	China	21
3	1993	Moscow	Russia	21
4	1995	Riesa	Germany	22
5	1997	Honolulu	United States	22
6	1999	Nowa Ruda	Poland	16
Age Group
1	2001	Zielona Góra	Poland	
2	2002	Riesa	Germany	
3	2004	Liévin	France	
4	2006	Coimbra	Portugal	
5	2008	Glasgow	United Kingdom	
6	2010	Wrocław	Poland	
7	2012	Orlando	United States	
8	2014	Levallois-Perret	France	
9	2016	Putian	China	
10	2018	Antwerp	Belgium	

== Aerobic ==
FIG Aerobic Gymnastics World Age Group Competitions :

Edition	Year	Host city	Host country	Events
2004	1	Sofia	Bulgaria	
2006	2	Nanjing	China	
2008	3	Ulm	Germany	
2010	4	Rodez	France	
2012	5	Sofia	Bulgaria	
2014	6	Cancún	Mexico	
2016	7	Incheon	South Korea	
2018	8	Guimarães	Portugal	
2021	9	Baku	Azerbaijan	

== Artistic ==
Edition	Year	Host city	Host country	Events
1	2019	Győr	Hungary	14
2	2023	Antalya	Turkey	14
2	2025	Manila	Philippines	14

== Parkour ==
Edition	Year	Host city	Host country	Events
1	2024	Kitakyushu	Japan	2

== Rhythmic ==
Edition	Year	Host city	Host country	Events
1	2019	Moscow	Russia	8
2	2023	Cluj-Napoca	Romania	8

== Trampoline ==
FIG Trampoline Gymnastics World Age Group Competitions are currently held in 32 disciplines:

- Categories (male and female):
  - Individual Trampoline
  - Synchronised Trampoline
  - Tumbling
  - Double-Mini Trampoline
- Age Groups:
  - Age Group 1 (11–12)
  - Age Group 2 (13–14)
  - Junior (15–16)
  - Age Group 3 (17–21)

Since 1998, the championships are held alongside the Trampoline Gymnastics World Championships, often a week later and in the same venue. From 1990 to 1996, the junior championships were in the same country as the Trampoline Gymnastics World Championships, but in a different city. The earlier championships, from 1973 to 1988, had separate hosts, unrelated to the Trampoline Gymnastics World Championships.

Year	Edition	Host city	Host country	Events
Separate Championships
1973	1	London	United Kingdom	34
1974	2	San Mateo	United States	24
1975	3	Toronto	Canada	24
1976	4	Cedar Rapids	United States	24
1978	5	Honolulu	United States	24
1984	6	Kanazawa	Japan	24
1986	7	Moulins	France	24
1988	8	Birmingham	United States	24
Host by Trampoline Gymnastics World Championships Host
1990	9	Dillenburg	Germany	24
1992	10	Auckland	New Zealand	24
1994	11	Vila do Conde	Portugal	24
1996	12	Kamloops	Canada	24
Alongside Trampoline Gymnastics World Championships
1998	13	Sydney	Australia	24
1999	14	Sun City	South Africa	24
2001	15	Odense	Denmark	24

Year	Edition	Host city	Host country	Events
2003	16	Hanover	Germany	24
2005	17	Eindhoven	Netherlands	24
2007	18	Quebec City	Canada	24
2009	19	Saint Petersburg	Russia	24
2010	20	Metz	France	24
2011	21	Birmingham	United Kingdom	24
2013	22	Sofia	Bulgaria	24
2014	23	Daytona Beach	United States	32
2015	24	Odense	Denmark	32
2017	25	Sofia	Bulgaria	32
2018	26	Saint Petersburg	Russia	32
2019	27	Tokyo	Japan	32
2021	28	Baku	Azerbaijan	32
2022	29	Sofia	Bulgaria	32
2023	30	Birmingham	United Kingdom	32
2025	31	Pamplona	Spain	32

== See also ==
- Gymnastics World Championships
- Gymnastics at the Youth Olympics
- Major achievements in gymnastics by nation
