= Acrobatic Gymnastics World Championships =

World Championships for acrobatic gymnastics

The Acrobatic Gymnastics World Championships are the World Championships for acrobatic gymnastics. Before 2006, they were known as the World Sports Acrobatics Championships.

== Editions ==
Year	Games	Host city	Country	Events	First in the Medal Table	Second in the Medal Table	Third in the Medal Table
1974	1	Moscow	Soviet Union	21	Soviet Union	Bulgaria	Poland
1976	2	Saarbrücken	West Germany	27	Soviet Union	West Germany	Poland
1978	3	Sofia	Bulgaria	21	Soviet Union	Bulgaria	Poland
1980	4	Poznań	Poland	21	Soviet Union	Bulgaria	Poland
1982	5	London	Great Britain	21	Soviet Union	Bulgaria	Poland
1984	6	Sofia	Bulgaria	21	Soviet Union	Bulgaria	China
1986	7	Rennes	France	21	Soviet Union	Bulgaria	China
1988	8	Antwerp	Belgium	21	Bulgaria	Soviet Union	China
1990	9	Augsburg	West Germany	21	Soviet Union	China	Bulgaria
1992	10	Rennes	France	21	Russia	China	France
1994	11	Beijing	China	21	China	Russia	Ukraine
1995	12	Wrocław	Poland	21	Russia	China	Bulgaria
1996	13	Riesa	Germany	21	China	Russia	Ukraine
1997	14	Manchester	Great Britain	21	Russia	Ukraine	China
1998	15	Minsk	Belarus	21	Russia	Great Britain	China
1999	16	Ghent	Belgium	15	Russia	China	Ukraine
2000	17	Wrocław	Poland	15	Russia	China	Bulgaria
2002	18	Riesa	Germany	5	Russia	China	United States
2004	19	Lievin	France	5	Russia	United States	Great Britain
2006	20	Coimbra	Portugal	5	Russia	Ukraine	Belarus
2008	21	Glasgow	Great Britain	5	Russia	Belarus	Ukraine
2010	22	Wrocław	Poland	5	Great Britain	Russia	Ukraine
2012	23	Lake Buena Vista	United States	5	Russia	Great Britain	Belgium
2014	24	Levallois-Perret	France	5	Russia	Great Britain	Belgium
2016	25	Putian	China	6	Russia	China	Belarus
2018	26	Antwerp	Belgium	6	Russia	Israel	Belarus
2021	27	Geneva	Switzerland	6	RGF	Portugal	Belgium
2022	28	Baku	Azerbaijan	16	Belgium	Portugal	United States
2024	29	Guimarães	Portugal	16	Belgium	China	Azerbaijan
2026	30	Pesaro	Italy		Israel	Russia	United States

== All-time medal table ==
Rank	Nation	Gold	Silver	Bronze	Total
1	Soviet Union	142	47	9	198
2	Russia	105	54	24	183
3	China	84	66	74	224
4	Bulgaria	57	79	78	214
5	Ukraine	24	37	49	110
6	Poland	14	47	67	128
7	Great Britain	14	20	31	65
8	Belgium	14	10	5	29
9	Germany	6	2	21	29
10	United States	5	11	23	39
11	Portugal	5	6	1	12
12	Russian Gymnastics Federation	5	0	1	6
13	Azerbaijan	4	3	7	14
14	Belarus	3	11	23	37
15	France	3	5	4	12
16	Israel	1	12	7	20
17	Kazakhstan	1	5	6	12
18	North Korea	0	2	3	5
19	Hungary	0	1	6	7
20	Lithuania	0	1	3	4
21	Australia	0	1	0	1
21	South Africa	0	1	0	1
21	Spain	0	1	0	1
24	Austria	0	0	1	1
Totals (24 entries)		487	422	443	1,352

== Junior and Age Group ==
Championships:

1989 to 1999 : Junior

2001 to 2002 : World Age Group Games

2004 to 2006 : International Age Group Competition

2008 to 2018: World Age Group Competition

2024: World Age Group Competition and Junior World Championships

Edition	Year	Host city	Host country	Events
Junior
1	1989	Katowice	Poland	21
2	1991	Beijing	China	21
3	1993	Moscow	Russia	21
4	1995	Riesa	Germany	22
5	1997	Honolulu	United States	22
6	1999	Nowa Ruda	Poland	16
	2024	Guimarães	Portugal	5
Age Groups
1	2001	Zielona Góra	Poland	
2	2002	Riesa	Germany	
3	2004	Liévin	France	
4	2006	Coimbra	Portugal	
5	2008	Glasgow	United Kingdom	
6	2010	Wrocław	Poland	
7	2012	Orlando	United States	
8	2014	Levallois-Perret	France	
9	2016	Putian	China	
10	2018	Antwerp	Belgium	
11	2020	Geneva	Switzerland	
12	2022	Baku	Azerbaijan	
13	2024	Guimarães	Portugal	10

=== All-time medal table (2024–) ===
Rank	Nation	Gold	Silver	Bronze	Total
1	Israel	7	3	0	10
2	United States	4	2	2	8
3	Azerbaijan	2	0	0	2
4	Kazakhstan	1	2	0	3
5	Italy	1	0	1	2
6	Great Britain	0	4	3	7
7	Portugal	0	1	3	4
8	Belgium	0	1	2	3
9	Bulgaria	0	1	1	2
9	Germany	0	1	1	2
11	Ukraine	0	0	2	2
Totals (11 entries)		15	15	15	45

== See also ==
- Acrobatic Gymnastics European Championships

== Results ==
http://www.sportsacrobatics.info/archive.htm
