= 1994 World Sports Acrobatics Championships =

11th World Sports Acrobatics Championships
- Location: Beijing, China
- Start date: 28 November 1994
- End date: 30 November 1994
- Competitors: 66 from 9 nations

The 1994 World Sports Acrobatics Championships were held in Beijing, China, between 28 and 30 November 1994.

== Medal table ==
Rank	Nation	Gold	Silver	Bronze	Total
1	China	14	3	1	18
2	Russia	6	4	4	14
3	Ukraine	1	8	4	13
4	Bulgaria	0	6	4	10
5	France	0	3	0	3
6	Poland	0	0	4	4
7	Azerbaijan	0	0	1	1
7	Belarus	0	0	1	1
7	Great Britain	0	0	1	1
Totals (9 entries)		21	24	20	65

== Men's Tumbling ==
=== Overall ===
Rank	Team	Country	Point
Gold medal	A. Khryzhanovsky	Russia	
Silver medal	Chen Bo	China	
Bronze medal	Y. Pedorenko	Ukraine	

=== First Exercise ===
Rank	Team	Country	Point
Gold medal	A. Khryzhanovsky	Russia	
Silver medal	Y. Pedorenko	Ukraine	
Bronze medal	Chen Bo	China	

=== Second Exercise ===
Rank	Team	Country	Point
Gold medal	A. Khryzhanovsky	Russia	
Silver medal	Chen Bo	China	
Bronze medal	Y. Pedorenko	Ukraine	

=== Men's Group ===
==== Overall ====
Rank	Team	Country	Point
Gold medal	Han Chen, Xu Wu, Yan Jianguang, Huang Yongjun	China	
Silver medal	Zakherenke, Okhshu, Sidorenko, Polishak	Ukraine	
Bronze medal	Nikolov, Georgiev, Nikolov, Vasiliev	Bulgaria	

==== First Exercise ====
Rank	Team	Country	Point
Gold medal	Han Chen, Xu Wu, Yan Jianguang, Huang Yongjun	China	
Silver medal	Zakherenke, Okhshu, Sidorenko, Polishak	Ukraine	
Bronze medal	Seifullaev, Lychkin, Lychkin, Shahbazzade	Azerbaijan	

==== Second Exercise ====
Rank	Team	Country	Point
Gold medal	Han Chen, Xu Wu, Yan Jianguang, Huang Yongjun	China	
Silver medal	Menzhega, Kirpichev, Vyacheslav, Volodin	Russia	
Bronze medal	Zakherenke, Okhshu, Sidorenko, Polishak	Ukraine	
Bronze medal	Nikolov, Georgiev, Nikolov, Vasiliev	Bulgaria	

=== Men's Pair ===
==== Overall ====
Rank	Team	Country	Point
Gold medal	Chao Fensu, Huang Hai	China	
Silver medal	Latchkov, Vladev	Bulgaria	
Silver medal	Nychyporuk, Rudenko	Ukraine	

==== First Exercise ====
Rank	Team	Country	Point
Gold medal	Chao Fensu, Huang Hai	China	
Silver medal	Latchkov, Vladev	Bulgaria	
Silver medal	Nychyporuk, Rudenko	Ukraine	

==== Second Exercise ====
Rank	Team	Country	Point
Gold medal	Chao Fensu, Huang Hai	China	
Silver medal	Latchkov, Vladev	Bulgaria	
Silver medal	Nychyporuk, Rudenko	Ukraine	

=== Mixed Pair ===
==== Overall ====
Rank	Team	Country	Point
Gold medal	Guan Bei, Jia Jianzhong	China	
Silver medal	Todorova, Katzov	Bulgaria	
Bronze medal	Yasenko, Knyaev	Russia	

==== First Exercise ====
Rank	Team	Country	Point
Gold medal	Guan Bei, Jia Jianzhong	China	
Silver medal	Todorova, Katzov	Bulgaria	
Bronze medal	Yasenko, Knyaev	Russia	

==== Second Exercise ====
Rank	Team	Country	Point
Gold medal	Guan Bei, Jia Jianzhong	China	
Silver medal	Todorova, Katzov	Bulgaria	
Bronze medal	Wilcox, Barton	United Kingdom	

=== Women's Group ===
==== Overall ====
Rank	Team	Country	Point
Gold medal	Ji Ziaolu, Zhou Dan, Wang Ju	China	
Silver medal	Kushu, Korogod, Suvorova	Russia	
Bronze medal	Petrova, Pankova, Ivanova	Bulgaria	
Bronze medal	Chmielewska, Mrozowicz, Pawliszyn	Poland	

==== First Exercise ====
Rank	Team	Country	Point
Gold medal	Ji Ziaolu, Zhou Dan, Wang Ju	China	
Silver medal	Kushu, Korogod, Suvorova	Russia	
Bronze medal	Chmielewska, Mrozowicz, Pawliszyn	Poland	

==== Second Exercise ====
Rank	Team	Country	Point
Gold medal	Ji Ziaolu, Zhou Dan, Wang Ju	China	
Silver medal	Kushu, Korogod, Suvorova	Russia	
Bronze medal	Petrova, Pankova, Ivanova	Bulgaria	

=== Women's Pair ===
==== Overall ====
Rank	Team	Country	Point
Gold medal	Chen Mei, Liang Haiqiong	China	
Silver medal	Antipova, Redkovolosova	Ukraine	
Bronze medal	Sakowska, Fijolek	Poland	
Bronze medal	Irina Payutova, Lyudmila Vinnikova	Russia	

==== First Exercise ====
Rank	Team	Country	Point
Gold medal	Chen Mei, Liang Haiqiong	China	
Silver medal	Antipova, Redkovolosova	Ukraine	
Bronze medal	Sakowska, Fijolek	Poland	

==== Second Exercise ====
Rank	Team	Country	Point
Gold medal	Antipova, Redkovolosova	Ukraine	
Silver medal	Chen Mei, Liang Haiqiong	China	
Bronze medal	Irina Payutova, Lyudmila Vinnikova	Russia	

=== Women's Tumbling ===
==== Overall ====
Rank	Team	Country	Point
Gold medal	T. Panivan	Russia	
Silver medal	C. Robert	France	
Bronze medal	E. Chabenko	Ukraine	

==== First Exercise ====
Rank	Team	Country	Point
Gold medal	T. Panivan	Russia	
Silver medal	C. Robert	France	
Bronze medal	T. Morozova	Belarus	

==== Second Exercise ====
Rank	Team	Country	Point
Gold medal	S. Kibanova	Russia	
Silver medal	C. Robert	France	
Bronze medal	N. Proseniuk	Ukraine	
