= 1986 World Sports Acrobatics Championships =

7th World Sports Acrobatics Championships
- Location: Rennes, France
- Start date: 27 November 1986
- End date: 29 November 1986
- Competitors: 71 from 8 nations

The 1986 World Sports Acrobatics Championships were held in Rennes, France, from 27 to 29 November 1986.

== Medal table ==
Rank	Nation	Gold	Silver	Bronze	Total
1	Soviet Union	13	5	0	18
2	Bulgaria	7	5	4	16
3	China	4	9	5	18
4	Poland	2	3	4	9
5	United States	0	2	3	5
6	Great Britain	0	1	2	3
7	Germany	0	0	3	3
8	France	0	0	1	1
Totals (8 entries)		26	25	22	73

== Men's Tumbling ==
=== Overall ===
Rank	Team	Country	Point
Gold medal	I. Brikman	Soviet Union	
Silver medal	A. Garstka	Poland	
Bronze medal	C. Fox	United States	

=== Somersault ===
Rank	Team	Country	Point
Gold medal	Evgeuni Ivanov	Soviet Union	
Gold medal	Andrzej Garstka	Poland	
Silver medal	Chad Fox	United States	
Bronze medal	Ian Matthews	United Kingdom	

=== Twisting ===
Rank	Team	Country	Point
Gold medal	Igor Brickman	Soviet Union	
Silver medal	Ian Matthews	United Kingdom	
Silver medal	Shao Chunhua	China	
Bronze medal	Chad Fox	United States	

=== Men's Group ===
==== Overall ====
Rank	Team	Country	Point
Gold medal		Soviet Union	
Silver medal		China	
Bronze medal		Bulgaria	

==== Balance ====
Rank	Team	Country	Point
Gold medal		Soviet Union	
Silver medal		Bulgaria	
Bronze medal		China	

==== Tempo ====
Rank	Team	Country	Point
Gold medal		Soviet Union	
Silver medal		China	
Bronze medal		West Germany	

=== Men's Pair ===
==== Overall ====
Rank	Team	Country	Point
Gold medal	Sergey Tsigevskiy, Valeriy Liapunov	Soviet Union	
Silver medal	Xu Hong, Hu Bingchen	China	
Bronze medal	D. Dimitrov, D. Karadzhev	Bulgaria	

==== Balance ====
Rank	Team	Country	Point
Gold medal	Sergey Tsigevskiy, Valeriy Liapunov	Soviet Union	
Silver medal	Xu Hong, Hu Bingchen	China	
Bronze medal	D. Dimitrov, D. Karadzhev	Bulgaria	

==== Tempo ====
Rank	Team	Country	Point
Gold medal	Xu Hong, Hu Bingchen	China	
Silver medal	D. Dimitrov, D. Karadzhev	Bulgaria	
Bronze medal	R. Jillg, A. Grassman	West Germany	

=== Mixed Pair ===
==== Overall ====
Rank	Team	Country	Point
Gold medal	I. Miller, E. Marchenko	Soviet Union	
Silver medal	R. Pencheva, E. Krystev	Bulgaria	
Bronze medal	Mao Heihua, Siu Ligan	China	

==== Balance ====
Rank	Team	Country	Point
Gold medal	R. Pencheva, E. Krystev	Bulgaria	
Silver medal	I. Miller, E. Marchenko	Soviet Union	
Bronze medal	Mao Heihua, Siu Ligan	China	

==== Tempo ====
Rank	Team	Country	Point
Gold medal	I. Miller, E. Marchenko	Soviet Union	
Silver medal	R. Pencheva, E. Krystev	Bulgaria	
Silver medal	Mao Heihua, Siu Ligan	China	
Bronze medal	T. Korzeniak, K. Murawski	Poland	

=== Women's Group ===
==== Overall ====
Rank	Team	Country	Point
Gold medal		Bulgaria	
Silver medal		China	
Bronze medal		Poland	

==== Balance ====
Rank	Team	Country	Point
Gold medal		Bulgaria	
Silver medal		Poland	
Bronze medal		China	

==== Tempo ====
Rank	Team	Country	Point
Gold medal		Bulgaria	
Gold medal		China	
Silver medal		Poland	
Silver medal		Soviet Union	
Bronze medal		West Germany	

=== Women's Pair ===
==== Overall ====
Rank	Team	Country	Point
Gold medal	S. Kostova, I. Bakalova	Bulgaria	
Silver medal	A. Babanisa, S. Bezrutchko	Soviet Union	
Bronze medal	M. Gluthshek, M. Krzhizhanovskaya	Poland	

==== Balance ====
Rank	Team	Country	Point
Gold medal	S. Kostova, I. Bakalova	Bulgaria	
Silver medal	A. Babanisa, S. Bezrutchko	Soviet Union	
Bronze medal	M. Gluthshek, M. Krzhizhanovskaya	Poland	
Bronze medal	Liu Yin, Wang Yin	China	

==== Tempo ====
Rank	Team	Country	Point
Gold medal	M. Gluthshek, M. Krzhizhanovskaya	Poland	
Gold medal	S. Kostova, I. Bakalova	Bulgaria	
Gold medal	A. Babanisa, S. Bezrutchko	Soviet Union	
Silver medal	Liu Yin, Wang Yin	China	
Silver medal	C. Borgman, T. Blalock	United States	
Bronze medal	A. Tout, A. Boultwood	United Kingdom	

=== Women's Tumbling ===
==== Overall ====
Rank	Gymnast	Country	Point
Gold medal	Huang Ruifen	China	
Silver medal	Ludmila Gromova	Soviet Union	
Bronze medal	Vania Dmitrova	Bulgaria	

==== Somersault ====
Rank	Gymnast	Country	Point
Gold medal	Ludmila Gromova	Soviet Union	
Silver medal	Huang Ruifen	China	
Bronze medal	Jill Hollembeak	United States	

==== Twisting ====
Rank	Gymnast	Country	Point
Gold medal	Huang Ruifen	China	
Silver medal	Elena Bougaeva	Soviet Union	
Bronze medal	Vania Dmitrova	Bulgaria	
