= 2024 World Age Group Acrobatic Gymnastics Competition =

- Venue: Guimarães Multipurpose Pavilion
- Location: Guimarães, Portugal
- Dates: 12–15 September

The 2024 World Age Group Acrobatic Gymnastics Competition was the thirteenth edition of the age group acrobatic gymnastics competition, took place in Guimarães, Portugal, from September 12 to 15, 2024. The competition was organized by the International Gymnastics Federation. Alongside the main event, organizers held a concurrent Junior World Championships.

== Medal summary ==
=== Junior World Championships ===
Event	Gold	Silver	Bronze
Men's Pair	United States; Vsevolod Ossolodkov; Yaroslav Ossolodkov	Kazakhstan; Zakhar Bazilevich; Llyas Mukhtassarov	Belgium; Karsten Buyse; Emiel Hebbrecht
Women's Pair	Israel; Ard Aber Deutch; Roni Teller	Portugal; Sofia Ferreira; Joana Silva	United Kingdom; Jessica Flay; Lydia Mulvey
Mixed Pair	Italy; Edoardo Ferraris; Arianna Luca	United States; Andrew Castro; Hailee Wong	United Kingdom; Emily Eares; Harry Norman
Men's Group	Israel; Liran Cohen; Liad Madar; Yevgeni Pinchukov; Eran Rodnay	United Kingdom; Archie Goonesekera; Joshua Lee; Lucas Mcdermott; Ralph White	Ukraine; Dmytro Borshchevskyi; Mykolai Khasanov; Volodymyr Repetll; Mykola Soroka
Women's Group	Azerbaijan; Anahita Bashiri; Zahra Rashidova; Nazrin Zeyniyeva	Israel; Matar Jarden; Noam Ronen; Noa Yifrah	Portugal; Leonor Carreira; Ema Fernandes; Alicia Santos

=== Age Group (13-19) ===
Event	Gold	Silver	Bronze
Men's Pair	United States; Yaroslav Ossolodkov; Vsevolod Ossolodkov	Kazakhstan; Zakhar Bazilevich; Llyas Mukhtassarov	Belgium; Emiel Hebbrecht; Karsten Buyse
Women's Pair	United States; Sydney Padios; Willow Noble	United Kingdom; Jessica Flay; Lydia Mulvey	Portugal; Sofia Ferreira; Joana Silva
Mixed Pair	United States; Hailee Wong; Andrew Castro	United Kingdom; Emily Eares; Harry Norman	Italy; Arianna Luca; Edoardo Ferraris
Men's Group	Israel; Liad Madar; Liran Cohen; Yevgeni Pinchukov; Eran Rodnay	Belgium; Ayden Dupont; Lars Maes; Kobe Multael; Tibe Tossens	United Kingdom; Lucas Mcdermott; Ralph White; Joshua Lee; Archie Goonesekera
Women's Group	Azerbaijan; Nazrin Zeyniyeva; Zahra Rashidova; Anahita Bashiri	Israel; Noam Ronen; Noa Yifrah; Matar Jarden	Portugal; Ema Fernandes; Alicia Santos; Leonor Carreira

=== Age Group (12-18) ===
Event	Gold	Silver	Bronze
Men's Pair	Israel; Aviel Rasson Cohen; Lidor Cohen	United States; Radomir Ossolodkov; Neko Sullivan	Ukraine; Viktor Berezovskyi; Matvii Kosariev
Women's Pair	Kazakhstan; Anna Glotova; Yelizaveta Kokhnovich	Israel; Lia Rafeld; Ofek Barak	United States; Maya Lissenkova; Bernice Zhao Moshos
Mixed Pair	Israel; Noy Cohen; Yannay Regev	Greece; Dioni Katikaridou; Athanasios Tsolakidis	Bulgaria; Viliana Kostadinova; Kristian Manolov
Men's Group	Israel; Ernst Chaimov; Miroslav Erokhin; Gleb Khatamov; Itamar Moshe Rubinstein	Bulgaria; Petar Todorov; Kaloyan Velinov; Martin Chelebiev; Yanko Kirov	Greece; Anastasios Karagkiozidis; Dimitrios Dallopoulos; Agapios Podaras; Anastasios Karagkiozidis
Women's Group	Israel; Tom Levy Aizner; Ofek Biran; Vanessa Babel	United Kingdom; Sophie Noyce; Alexis Biddle; Gemma Biddle	United States; Roni Azerrad; Audrey Wang; Isabella Collazo

== Medal table ==
* Host nation (Portugal)

Rank	Nation	Gold	Silver	Bronze	Total
1	Israel	7	3	0	10
2	United States	4	2	2	8
3	Azerbaijan	2	0	0	2
4	Kazakhstan	1	2	0	3
5	Italy	1	0	1	2
6	Great Britain	0	4	3	7
7	Portugal*	0	1	3	4
8	Belgium	0	1	2	3
9	Bulgaria	0	1	1	2
9	Germany	0	1	1	2
11	Ukraine	0	0	2	2
Totals (11 entries)		15	15	15	45
