= Zhou Dan =

Chinese activist

Zhou Dan 周丹
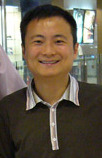
- Zhou Dan in 2005
- Born: 19 January 1974 (age 52); Shanghai, China
- Education: Harvard Law School (S.J.D. candidate, L.L.M.); Renmin University of China (L.L.M.)
- Occupations: Scholar and lawyer

Zhou Dan (Chinese: 周丹; pinyin: Zhōu Dān; born 19 January 1974) is a Chinese lawyer, scholar and activist based in Shanghai. He is a leading voice for rights of gay and lesbian people in mainland China.

Writing with his real name about being gay on Chinese websites for years, he came out to a local newspaper in Shanghai about his gay identity in November 2003. Since then, as the first openly gay lawyer in mainland China who has spoken out for LGBT rights, his name has been mentioned from time to time in Chinese newspapers, magazines, and television programs.

== Activism ==
In April 2003, Zhou founded the Shanghai Hotline For Sexual Minorities, after a state-run hospital contacted him to help organise a health hotline. The government approval of the hotline made it the first legitimate entity in Shanghai dedicated to the LGBT community. In 2005, he founded Yu Dan— the first Chinese organization promoting recognition and acceptance of LGBT rights in mainland China— serving as its executive director. He had first started giving advice and commentary on LGBT discussion forums online in 1998; and while he doesn't usually provide pro bono legal services, he continues to provide free advice to members of the LGBT community over the phone.

He also fights for the rights of people living with or affected by HIV/AIDS in China, by advocating a human-rights-based approach to the epidemic. He successfully lobbied the Ministry of Health to not bar HIV-positive people from government jobs. In February 2015, the United States Department of State hosted Zhou for a screening of the documentary The Blood of Yingzhou District (2006), which is about the plight of children in Yingzhou District who lost their parents to AIDS.

== Education and research ==
Zhou is an S.J.D. candidate at Harvard Law School with a dissertation focusing on public interest law in China. He holds LLM degrees from HLS and Renmin University of China. During his undergraduate education, his major was in intellectual property and copyright.

From January to May 2004, Zhou was a visiting scholar at the Yale Law School China Law Center with research emphasis on equality and anti-discrimination related to sexuality and HIV/AIDS. He was a visiting scholar at Yale from September to October 2006, and in 2015 as well. He has also been a visiting scholar at NYU's U.S.-Asia Law Institute.

In November 2004, he taught China's first graduate-school class on homosexuality and social science, and gave a lecture on "homosexuality and law" for the postgraduate course on "Homosexuality and Sociology" offered by the Fudan University School of Public Health in Shanghai. The course followed an earlier graduate course on "Homosexual Health" initiated in 2003 that focused mainly on AIDS prevention.

He is the editor of Homosexuality and Law: Essays and Materials of the International Conference on Sexuality, Policy, and Law, the proceedings of the first ever symposium in China on legal topics related to sexual orientation, which he co-organized with Yale's China Law Center in 2006.

In May 2009, he published a monograph— 爱悦与规训: 中国现代性中同性欲望的法理想象 (Pleasure and Discipline: Jurisprudential Imagination of Same-sex Desire in Chinese Modernity)— on the dynamics of same-sex desire, law and modernity in China; which was one of the first Chinese-language academic books on the subject.

== Recognition ==
Zhou was profiled in the May 2005 issue of French gay and lesbian magazine Têtu, in the June 20, 2005 issue of TIME Magazine, in the September 5, 2005 issue of Southern People Weekly, in the September 30 issue of China Daily, and in the October 20, 2013 issue of South China Morning Post.

In 2006, Equality Forum, a nonprofit LGBTQ rights organization, named him the recipient of the 11th Annual International Role Model Award.

He was included in Time magazine's 2009 list of the 60 most influential people in China, where he was the only openly gay person in the list. He was also profiled in the 2010 documentary titled The Cream of the Queer Crop (同志她她她他他他) directed by Wei Xiaogang for Queer Comrades, a Beijing-based queer community video streaming website.

== Personal life ==
Zhou was born and brought up in Shanghai, where he went to law school, and got a job as a lawyer for the Shanghai Shaogang Law Firm.

He came out to his family in 2001, and has been living with his partner since 2003.
