= 1980 World Sports Acrobatics Championships =

4th World Sports Acrobatics Championships
- Location: Poznań, Poland
- Start date: 16 September 1980
- End date: 22 September 1980
- Competitors: 60 from 6 nations

The 1980 World Sports Acrobatics Championships were held in Poznań, Poland, from 16 to 22 September 1980.

== Medal table ==
Rank	Nation	Gold	Silver	Bronze	Total
1	Soviet Union	14	5	1	20
2	Bulgaria	5	5	4	14
3	Poland	3	10	3	16
4	China	0	0	10	10
5	United States	0	0	2	2
6	Germany	0	0	1	1
Totals (6 entries)		22	20	21	63

== Men's Tumbling ==
=== Overall ===
Rank	Gymnast	Country	Point
Gold medal	V. Bindler	Soviet Union	
Silver medal	Andrzej Garstka	Poland	
Bronze medal	Dickie Bivens	United States	

=== First Exercise ===
Rank	Gymnast	Country	Point
Gold medal	Andrzej Garstka	Poland	
Silver medal	Robiert Zielewicz	Poland	
Bronze medal	Dickie Bivens	United States	

=== Second Exercise ===
Rank	Gymnast	Country	Point
Gold medal	A. Rosolin	Soviet Union	
Silver medal	V. Bindler	Soviet Union	
Bronze medal	Andrzej Garstka	Poland	

=== Men's Group ===
==== Overall ====
Rank	Team	Country	Point
Gold medal		Soviet Union	
Silver medal		Poland	
Bronze medal		Bulgaria	

==== First Exercise ====
Rank	Team	Country	Point
Gold medal		Soviet Union	
Silver medal		Bulgaria	
Bronze medal		West Germany	

==== Second Exercise ====
Rank	Team	Country	Point
Gold medal		Poland	
Silver medal		Soviet Union	
Bronze medal		Bulgaria	

=== Men's Pair ===
==== Overall ====
Rank	Team	Country	Point
Gold medal	Vladimir Pochevalov, Vassily Machuga	Soviet Union	
Silver medal	Bronislav Dziurla, Slavomir Kielbasinski	Poland	
Bronze medal	Xu Hong, Hu Binghen	China	

==== First Exercise ====
Rank	Team	Country	Point
Gold medal	Vladimir Pochevalov, Vassily Machuga	Soviet Union	
Silver medal	Dimitar Russanov, Petko Petkov	Bulgaria	
Bronze medal	Bronislav Dziurla, Slavomir Kielbasinski	Poland	

==== Second Exercise ====
Rank	Team	Country	Point
Gold medal	Vladimir Pochevalov, Vassily Machuga	Soviet Union	
Silver medal	Bronislav Dziurla, Slavomir Kielbasinski	Poland	
Bronze medal	Xu Hong, Hu Binghen	China	

=== Mixed Pair ===
==== Overall ====
Rank	Team	Country	Point
Gold medal	Angelova Bojana, Dimitar Mintchev	Bulgaria	
Silver medal	Katarzyna Kornobis, Andrzej Ruszkovski	Poland	
Bronze medal	Jianjun Yu, Lihong Luo	China	

==== First Exercise ====
Rank	Team	Country	Point
Gold medal	V. Pismienny, J. Jarans	Soviet Union	
Silver medal	Angelova Bojana, Dimitar Mintchev	Bulgaria	
Bronze medal	Katarzyna Kornobis, Andrzej Ruszkovski	Poland	

==== Second Exercise ====
Rank	Team	Country	Point
Gold medal	Angelova Bojana, Dimitar Mintchev	Bulgaria	
Silver medal	Katarzyna Kornobis, Andrzej Ruszkovski	Poland	
Bronze medal	Jianjun Yu, Lihong Luo	China	

=== Women's Tumbling ===
==== Overall ====
Rank	Gymnast	Country	Point
Gold medal	Ludmila Gromova	Soviet Union	
Silver medal	Mella Mustafova	Bulgaria	
Bronze medal	Ma Suping	China	

==== First Exercise ====
Rank	Gymnast	Country	Point
Gold medal	Valentina Zavaliy	Soviet Union	
Silver medal	Ludmila Gromova	Soviet Union	
Bronze medal	Mella Mustafova	Bulgaria	

==== Second Exercise ====
Rank	Gymnast	Country	Point
Gold medal	Mella Mustafova	Bulgaria	
Silver medal	Ludmila Gromova	Soviet Union	
Bronze medal	Vania Vasilieva	Bulgaria	

=== Women's Group ===
==== Overall ====
Rank	Team	Country	Point
Gold medal		Soviet Union	
Silver medal		Bulgaria	
Bronze medal		China	

==== First Exercise ====
Rank	Team	Country	Point
Gold medal		Poland	
Silver medal		Bulgaria	
Bronze medal		Soviet Union	

==== Second Exercise ====
Rank	Team	Country	Point
Gold medal		Bulgaria	
Silver medal		Soviet Union	
Bronze medal		China	

=== Women's Pair ===
==== Overall ====
Rank	Team	Country	Point
Gold medal	Nadejda Tischtschenko, Rita Kucharenko	Soviet Union	
Silver medal	Agata Ostrovska, Beata Boroviec	Poland	
Bronze medal	Lo Lihun, In Wu	China	

==== First Exercise ====
Rank	Team	Country	Point
Gold medal	Nadejda Tischtschenko, Rita Kucharenko	Soviet Union	
Silver medal	Agata Ostrovska, Beata Boroviec	Poland	
Bronze medal	Lo Lihun, In Wu	China	

==== Second Exercise ====
Rank	Team	Country	Point
Gold medal	Nadejda Tischtschenko, Rita Kucharenko	Soviet Union	
Silver medal	Agata Ostrovska, Beata Boroviec	Poland	
Bronze medal	Lo Lihun, In Wu	China	
