= 1982 World Sports Acrobatics Championships =

5th World Sports Acrobatics Championships
- Location: (United Kingdom) London, Great Britain
- Start date: 9 September 1982
- End date: 11 September 1982
- Competitors: 63 from 7 nations

The 1982 World Sports Acrobatics Championships were held in London, Great Britain, from 9 to 11 September 1982.

== Medal table ==
Rank	Nation	Gold	Silver	Bronze	Total
1	Soviet Union	19	3	0	22
2	Bulgaria	6	6	6	18
3	China	1	6	5	12
4	Poland	1	5	7	13
5	United States	0	1	1	2
6	Great Britain	0	0	2	2
7	Germany	0	0	1	1
Totals (7 entries)		27	21	22	70

== Men's Tumbling ==
=== Overall ===
Rank	Gymnast	Country	Point
Gold medal	Alexander Rassolin	Soviet Union	
Silver medal	Igor Brikman	Soviet Union	
Bronze medal	Andrzej Garstka	Poland	

=== First Exercise ===
Rank	Gymnast	Country	Point
Gold medal	Alexander Rassolin	Soviet Union	
Silver medal	Steve Elliott	United States	
Bronze medal	Eric Wood	United Kingdom	

=== Second Exercise ===
Rank	Gymnast	Country	Point
Gold medal	Igor Brikman	Soviet Union	
Silver medal	Andrzej Garstka	Poland	
Bronze medal	Steve Elliott	United States	
Bronze medal	Plamen Eutimov	Bulgaria	

=== Men's Group ===
==== Overall ====
Rank	Team	Country	Point
Gold medal		Soviet Union	
Silver medal		China	
Bronze medal		Poland	

==== First Exercise ====
Rank	Team	Country	Point
Gold medal		Soviet Union	
Gold medal		China	
Silver medal		Poland	
Bronze medal		Bulgaria	

==== Second Exercise ====
Rank	Team	Country	Point
Gold medal		Soviet Union	
Silver medal		Poland	
Bronze medal		Bulgaria	

=== Men's Pair ===
==== Overall ====
Rank	Team	Country	Point
Gold medal	S. Petrov, Y. Tishler	Soviet Union	
Silver medal	Hu Bingcheng, Xu Hong	China	
Bronze medal	S. Kielbasinski, K. Suszek	Poland	

==== First Exercise ====
Rank	Team	Country	Point
Gold medal	S. Petrov, Y. Tishler	Soviet Union	
Silver medal	Hu Bingcheng, Xu Hong	China	
Bronze medal	A. Jordan, B. Cvetan	Bulgaria	

==== Second Exercise ====
Rank	Team	Country	Point
Gold medal	S. Kielbasinski, K. Suszek	Poland	
Gold medal	S. Petrov, Y. Tishler	Soviet Union	
Silver medal	A. Jordan, B. Cvetan	Bulgaria	
Bronze medal	C. Mike, N. Glynn	United Kingdom	

=== Mixed Pair ===
==== Overall ====
Rank	Team	Country	Point
Gold medal	V. Pismenny, I. Yarans	Soviet Union	
Gold medal	B. Angelova, D. Minchev	Bulgaria	
Silver medal	K. Kornobis, A. Ruszkowski	Poland	
Bronze medal	L. Peter, S. Karin	West Germany	

==== First Exercise ====
Rank	Team	Country	Point
Gold medal	V. Pismenny, I. Yarans	Soviet Union	
Silver medal	B. Angelova, D. Minchev	Bulgaria	
Bronze medal	K. Kornobis, A. Ruszkowski	Poland	

==== Second Exercise ====
Rank	Team	Country	Point
Gold medal	V. Pismenny, I. Yarans	Soviet Union	
Silver medal	B. Angelova, D. Minchev	Bulgaria	
Bronze medal	K. Kornobis, A. Ruszkowski	Poland	

=== Women's Group ===
==== Overall ====
Rank	Team	Country	Point
Gold medal		Soviet Union	
Silver medal		China	
Bronze medal		Bulgaria	

==== First Exercise ====
Rank	Team	Country	Point
Gold medal		Soviet Union	
Silver medal		Bulgaria	
Bronze medal		China	

==== Second Exercise ====
Rank	Team	Country	Point
Gold medal		Soviet Union	
Silver medal		Bulgaria	
Bronze medal		China	

=== Women's Pair ===
==== Overall ====
Rank	Team	Country	Point
Gold medal	A. Andonova, A. Milovanova	Bulgaria	
Gold medal	S. Mkrtychian, L. Glazunova	Soviet Union	
Silver medal	Yin Wu, Zheng Jianhua	China	
Bronze medal	D. Chwalbogowska, M. Gluszek	Poland	

==== First Exercise ====
Rank	Team	Country	Point
Gold medal	A. Andonova, A. Milovanova	Bulgaria	
Silver medal	S. Mkrtychian, L. Glazunova	Soviet Union	
Bronze medal	Yin Wu, Zheng Jianhua	China	

==== Second Exercise ====
Rank	Team	Country	Point
Gold medal	A. Andonova, A. Milovanova	Bulgaria	
Gold medal	S. Mkrtychian, L. Glazunova	Soviet Union	
Silver medal	D. Chwalbogowska, M. Gluszek	Poland	
Bronze medal	Yin Wu, Zheng Jianhua	China	

=== Women's Tumbling ===
==== Overall ====
Rank	Gymnast	Country	Point
Gold medal	Mela Mustafova	Bulgaria	
Silver medal	Ludmila Gromova	Soviet Union	
Bronze medal	Elena Filipova	Bulgaria	

==== First Exercise ====
Rank	Gymnast	Country	Point
Gold medal	Ludmila Gromova	Soviet Union	
Silver medal	Mela Mustafova	Bulgaria	
Bronze medal	Cao Zhongying	China	

==== Second Exercise ====
Rank	Gymnast	Country	Point
Gold medal	Ludmila Gromova	Soviet Union	
Gold medal	Mela Mustafova	Bulgaria	
Silver medal	Ma Suping	China	
Bronze medal	Dorota Poplawska	Poland	
