= 1998 World Sports Acrobatics Championships =

15th World Sports Acrobatics Championships
- Location: Minsk, Belarus
- Start date: 28 October 1998
- End date: 31 October 1998
- Competitors: 67 from 10 nations

The 1998 World Sports Acrobatics Championships were held in Minsk, Belarus, from 28 October to 31 October 1998.

== Medal table ==
Rank	Nation	Gold	Silver	Bronze	Total
1	Russia	11	6	5	22
2	Great Britain	5	2	0	7
3	China	2	3	3	8
4	Poland	2	0	3	5
5	Ukraine	1	6	4	11
6	Belarus	0	2	4	6
7	Kazakhstan	0	1	0	1
7	Lithuania	0	1	0	1
9	Azerbaijan	0	0	1	1
9	Bulgaria	0	0	1	1
Totals (10 entries)		21	21	21	63

== Men's Tumbling ==
=== Overall ===
Rank	Team	Country	Point
Gold medal	A. Kryzhanovsky	Russia	29.720
Silver medal	I. Adamenkov	Belarus	29.680
Bronze medal	D. Serdiukov	Russia	29.500

=== Straight ===
Rank	Team	Country	Point
Gold medal	D. Serdiukov	Russia	
Silver medal	Andrey Duhno	Kazakhstan	
Bronze medal	Tomasz Kies	Poland	

=== Twist ===
Rank	Team	Country	Point
Gold medal	D. Serdiukov	Russia	
Silver medal	Craig Filmer	United Kingdom	
Bronze medal	Tomasz Kies	Poland	

=== Men's Group ===
==== Overall ====
Rank	Team	Country	Point
Gold medal	Riusev, Fomin, Sosin, Simonenko	Russia	29.820
Silver medal	Ji, Zhu, Chen, Shen	China	29.700
Bronze medal	Nikolov, Grirorguev, Hristov, Bojenov	Bulgaria	29.480

==== Balance ====
Rank	Team	Country	Point
Gold medal	Riusev, Fomin, Sosin, Simonenko	Russia	
Silver medal	Safon, Zaveryucha, Pavlov, Bain	Ukraine	
Bronze medal	Ji, Zhu, Chen, Shen	China	

==== Tempo ====
Rank	Team	Country	Point
Gold medal	Riusev, Fomin, Sosin, Simonenko	Russia	
Silver medal	Ji, Zhu, Chen, Shen	China	
Bronze medal	Seyfullayev, Lichkin, Shahbazzade, Mamedov	Azerbaijan	

=== Men's Pair ===
==== Overall ====
Rank	Team	Country	Point
Gold medal	Mark Flores, Martyn Smith	United Kingdom	29.820
Silver medal	Renjie Li, Min Song	China	29.800
Bronze medal	Volkov, Vlasov	Russia	29.800

==== Balance ====
Rank	Team	Country	Point
Gold medal	Mark Flores, Martyn Smith	United Kingdom	
Silver medal	Volkov, Vlasov	Russia	
Bronze medal	Renjie Li, Min Song	China	

==== Tempo ====
Rank	Team	Country	Point
Gold medal	Renjie Li, Min Song	China	
Silver medal	Viktor Kalinin, Aleksei Malyszew	Lithuania	
Bronze medal	Volkov, Vlasov	Russia	

=== Mixed Pair ===
==== Overall ====
Rank	Team	Country	Point
Gold medal	Law, Griffiths	United Kingdom	29.760
Silver medal	Ponomareva, Besha	Ukraine	29.580
Bronze medal	Yerasarina, Yasenko	Belarus	29.420

==== Balance ====
Rank	Team	Country	Point
Gold medal	Galiulina, Kukva	Russia	
Silver medal	Law, Griffiths	United Kingdom	
Bronze medal	Ponomareva, Besha	Ukraine	

==== Tempo ====
Rank	Team	Country	Point
Gold medal	Law, Griffiths	United Kingdom	
Silver medal	Ponomareva, Besha	Ukraine	
Bronze medal	Galiulina, Kukva	Russia	

=== Women's Group ===
==== Overall ====
Rank	Team	Country	Point
Gold medal	Gamrot, Kalinowska, Adamiecka	Poland	29.780
Silver medal	Shalashova, Syrova, Babshkina	Russia	29.720
Bronze medal	Wang, Hou, Liu	China	29.660

==== Balance ====
Rank	Team	Country	Point
Gold medal	Wang, Hou, Liu	China	
Silver medal	Shalashova, Syrova, Babshkina	Russia	
Bronze medal	Gamrot, Kalinowska, Adamiecka	Poland	

==== Tempo ====
Rank	Team	Country	Point
Gold medal	Gamrot, Kalinowska, Adamiecka	Poland	
Silver medal	Shalashova, Syrova, Babshkina	Russia	
Bronze medal	Erina, Kosenko, Demidenko	Ukraine	

=== Women's Pair ===
==== Overall ====
Rank	Team	Country	Point
Gold medal	Kovalchuk, Vishnevskaya	Ukraine	29.760
Silver medal	Yulia Lopatkina, Anna Mokhova	Russia	29.740
Bronze medal	Rakseyeva, Feoktova	Belarus	29.740

==== Balance ====
Rank	Team	Country	Point
Gold medal	Yulia Lopatkina, Anna Mokhova	Russia	
Silver medal	Kovalchuk, Vishnevskaya	Ukraine	
Bronze medal	Rakseyeva, Feoktova	Belarus	

==== Tempo ====
Rank	Team	Country	Point
Gold medal	Pascoe, Cotterell	United Kingdom	
Silver medal	Yulia Lopatkina, Anna Mokhova	Russia	
Bronze medal	Kovalchuk, Vishnevskaya	Ukraine	

=== Women's Tumbling ===
==== Overall ====
Rank	Team	Country	Point
Gold medal	N. Rakhmanova	Russia	29.600
Silver medal	E. Chabanenko	Ukraine	29.500
Bronze medal	E. Bluzhina	Russia	29.480

==== Straight ====
Rank	Team	Country	Point
Gold medal	N. Rakhmanova	Russia	
Silver medal	T. Morozova	Belarus	
Bronze medal	E. Dribna	Ukraine	

==== Twist ====
Rank	Team	Country	Point
Gold medal	E. Bluzhina	Russia	
Silver medal	E. Chabanenko	Ukraine	
Bronze medal	T. Morozova	Belarus	
