= 1999 World Sports Acrobatics Championships =

16th World Sports Acrobatics Championships
- Location: Ghent, Belgium
- Start date: 3 November 1999
- End date: 7 November 1999
- Competitors: 49 from 7 nations

The 1999 World Sports Acrobatics Championships were held in Ghent, Belgium, from 3 to 7 November 1999.

== Medal table ==
Rank	Nation	Gold	Silver	Bronze	Total
1	Russia	8	3	2	13
2	China	5	4	2	11
3	Ukraine	2	2	7	11
4	Bulgaria	0	2	1	3
4	Great Britain	0	2	1	3
6	Poland	0	2	0	2
7	Belarus	0	0	2	2
Totals (7 entries)		15	15	15	45

== Men's Group ==
=== Overall ===
Rank	Team	Country	Point
Gold medal	Ji Lei, Chen Yongjun, Shen Sihua, Zhu Pengtao	China	
Silver medal	Alexei Gribtsov, Sergei Kholodov, Konstantin Kovalev, Pavel Pozdniakov	Russia	
Bronze medal	Maliutin, Maskai, Zalensk, Buin	Belarus	

=== Balance ===
Rank	Team	Country	Point
Gold medal	Ji Lei, Chen Yongjun, Shen Sihua, Zhu Pengtao	China	
Silver medal	Serhiy Pavlov, Andriy Safonov, Hennadiy Skarlat, Yuriy Zaveryukha	Ukraine	
Bronze medal	Maliutin, Maskai, Zalensk, Buin	Belarus	

=== Tempo ===
Rank	Team	Country	Point
Gold medal	Ji Lei, Chen Yongjun, Shen Sihua, Zhu Pengtao	China	
Silver medal	Alexei Gribtsov, Sergei Kholodov, Konstantin Kovalev, Pavel Pozdniakov	Russia	
Bronze medal	Serhiy Pavlov, Andriy Safonov, Hennadiy Skarlat, Yuriy Zaveryukha	Ukraine	

=== Men's Pair ===
==== Overall ====
Rank	Team	Country	Point
Gold medal	Renjie Li, Min Song	China	
Silver medal	Mark Flores, Martyn Smith	United Kingdom	
Bronze medal	Tatarchuk, Snarskiy	Ukraine	

==== Balance ====
Rank	Team	Country	Point
Gold medal	Aleksei Anikin, Sergei Batrakov	Russia	
Silver medal	Renjie Li, Min Song	China	
Bronze medal	Mark Flores, Martyn Smith	United Kingdom	

==== Tempo ====
Rank	Team	Country	Point
Gold medal	Aleksei Anikin, Sergei Batrakov	Russia	
Silver medal	Renjie Li, Min Song	China	
Bronze medal	Tatarchuk, Snarskiy	Ukraine	

=== Mixed Pair ===
==== Overall ====
Rank	Team	Country	Point
Gold medal	Polina Lymareva, Andrei Jakovlev	Russia	
Silver medal	Guetcheva, Ivaylo Katzov	Bulgaria	
Bronze medal	Dzyuba, Klymenko	Ukraine	

==== Balance ====
Rank	Team	Country	Point
Gold medal	Polina Lymareva, Andrei Jakovlev	Russia	
Silver medal	Dzyuba, Klymenko	Ukraine	
Bronze medal	Guetcheva, Ivaylo Katzov	Bulgaria	

==== Tempo ====
Rank	Team	Country	Point
Gold medal	Polina Lymareva, Andrei Jakovlev	Russia	
Silver medal	Guetcheva, Ivaylo Katzov	Bulgaria	
Bronze medal	Dzyuba, Klymenko	Ukraine	

=== Women's Group ===
==== Overall ====
Rank	Team	Country	Point
Gold medal	Kovposha, Ganna Demidenko, Yelena Kosenko	Ukraine	
Silver medal	Liu Xia, Wei He, Wang Cong	China	
Bronze medal	Frolova, Antsypova, Koudriavtseva	Russia	

==== Balance ====
Rank	Team	Country	Point
Gold medal	Kovposha, Ganna Demidenko, Yelena Kosenko	Ukraine	
Silver medal	Liu Xia, Wei He, Wang Cong	China	
Bronze medal	Frolova, Antsypova, Koudriavtseva	Russia	

==== Tempo ====
Rank	Team	Country	Point
Gold medal	Liu Xia, Wei He, Wang Cong	China	
Silver medal	Frolova, Antsypova, Koudriavtseva	Russia	
Bronze medal	Kovposha, Ganna Demidenko, Yelena Kosenko	Ukraine	

=== Women's Pair ===
==== Overall ====
Rank	Team	Country	Point
Gold medal	Yulia Lopatkina, Anna Mokhova	Russia	
Silver medal	Sakowska, Wojturska	Poland	
Bronze medal	Chen Ling, Guanglei Sun	China	

==== Balance ====
Rank	Team	Country	Point
Gold medal	Yulia Lopatkina, Anna Mokhova	Russia	
Silver medal	Joanna Greggs, Sharlene Slater	United Kingdom	
Bronze medal	Chen Ling, Guanglei Sun	China	

==== Tempo ====
Rank	Team	Country	Point
Gold medal	Yulia Lopatkina, Anna Mokhova	Russia	
Silver medal	Sakowska, Wojturska	Poland	
Bronze medal	Liudmilla Kovalchuk, Iryna Vyshnevska	Ukraine	
