= 2026 Acrobatic Gymnastics World Championships =

30th Acrobatic Gymnastics World Championships
- Location: Pesaro, Italy
- Start date: 24 September 2026
- End date: 27 September 2026

The 2026 Acrobatic Gymnastics World Championships was held from 24 until 27 September 2026 in Pesaro, Italy. 800 athletes from 45 countries are expected to compete. 249 athletes from 30 countries participated in the senior competition.

== Schedule ==
- Thursday, September 24
  - Opening ceremony
  - Qualifications: Balanced male pair / Dynamic female group
  - Qualifications: Women's Balance Pair / Men's Balance Group / Mixed Dynamic Pair
- Friday, September 25
  - Opening ceremony
  - Qualifications: Dynamic male pair / Balanced female group
  - Qualifications: Dynamic female pair / Dynamic male group / Balanced mixed pair
  - Team medal presentation
- Saturday, September 26
  - Women's Pair Combined Finals / Men's Pair Combined Finals
  - Finals: Women's Balance Pair / Men's Dynamic Pair
  - Women's Balance Group Finals / Mixed Dynamic Pairs / Men's Balance Group Finals
- Sunday, September 27
  - Women's Combined Group Finals / Mixed Pairs Combined Finals / Men's Combined Group Finals
  - Finals: Dynamic women's pair / Balanced men's pair
  - Women's Dynamic Group Finals / Mixed Balance Pairs / Men's Dynamic Group Finals

== Participants ==
World Gymnastics has authorized Russian and Belarusian gymnasts to compete under their own flags.

Final list established on 24 June 2026:

- Armenia (2)
- Australia (10)
- Austria (7)
- Azerbaijan (7)
- Belgium (8)
- Belarus (13)
- Bulgaria (4)
- Canada (6)
- China (7)
- Spain (7)
- Estonia (2)
- Finland (6)
- France (10)
- United Kingdom (22)
- Georgia (5)
- Germany (16)
- Hungary (4)
- India (11)
- Israel (16)
- Italy (3)
- Kazakhstan (2)
- Moldova (2)
- Poland (12)
- Portugal (15)
- North Korea (4)
- South Africa (2)
- Russia (26)
- Switzerland (3)
- Ukraine (17)
- United States (18)
- Uzbekistan (6)

== Events ==
Event	Gold	Silver	Bronze
Team	Israel; Arad Aber Deutch; Ori Dekel; Roni Rotman; Rony Cohen; Shiraz Sokolovsky; Liad Madar; Liran Cohen; Yevgeni Pinchukov; Eran Rodnay	Russia; Dinara Aisina; Svetlana Filipeva; Vasilisa Gavrilina; Sergei Kondrachuk; Nikolai Krestnikov; Stepan Kulbakin; Artem Kuznetsov; Artemii Petrovskii	United States; Aubrie Cunningham; Carmelle Djoumgoue; Willow Noble; Vsevolod Ossolodkov; Yaroslav Ossolodkov; Sydney Padios; Juli Williams

=== Combined ===
Event	Gold	Silver	Bronze
Male duo	United States; Vsevolod Ossolodkov; Yaroslav Ossolodkov	Kazakhstan; Zakhar Bazilevich; Ilyas Mukhtassarov	Belarus; Ilya Famenkou; Raman Khalimonchyk
Female duo	Israel; Rony Cohen; Shiraz Sokolovsky	Great Britain; Jessica Flay; Lydia Mulvey	United States; Willow Noble; Sydney Padios
Mixed duo	Ukraine	Portugal	Russia
Female group	China	United States	Belarus
Male group	Israel; Liad Madar; Liran Cohen; Yevgeni Pinchukov; Eran Rodnay	Russia; Sergei Kondrachuk; Nikolai Krestnikov; Stepan Kulbakin; Artem Kuznetsov	Uzbekistan; Anvarjon Gofurov; Khikmatillo Ibrokhimov; Ikromjon Nosirov; Azizbek Saparbaev

=== Balance ===
Event	Gold	Silver	Bronze
Male duo	United States	Kazakhstan	Azerbaijan
Female duo	Israel; Rony Cohen; Shiraz Sokolovsky	Russia; Kseniia Kolotova; Kseniia Kuznetsova	United Kingdom; Jessica Flay; Lydia Mulvey
Mixed duo	Ukraine; Yevfrosyniia Kryvytska; Ivan Labunets	North Korea	Russia
Female group	China	Israel	Russia
Male group			

=== Dynamic ===
Event	Gold	Silver	Bronze
Male duo			
Female duo	Israel; Rony Cohen; Shiraz Sokolovsky	United Kingdom; Jessica Flay; Lydia Mulvey	United States; Willow Noble; Sydney Padios
Mixed duo	Russia	Ukraine; Yevfrosyniia Kryvytska; Ivan Labunets	Portugal
Female group	Azerbaijan; Anahita Bashiri; Zahra Rashidova; Nazrin Zeyniyeva	Israel; Arad Aber Deutch; Ori Dekel; Roni Rotman	Ukraine; Alina Koval; Viktoriia Sukhonos; Viktoriia Tkach
Male group	Russia; Sergei Kondrachuk; Nikolai Krestnikov; Stepan Kulbakin; Artem Kuznetsov	Israel; Liad Madar; Liran Cohen; Yevgeni Pinchukov; Eran Rodnay	Uzbekistan; Anvarjon Gofurov; Khikmatillo Ibrokhimov; Ikromjon Nosirov; Azizbek Saparbaev

=== Medal Table ===
* Host nation (Italy)

Rank	Nation	Gold	Silver	Bronze	Total
1	Israel	5	3	0	8
2	Russia	3	3	3	9
3	United States	3	1	3	7
4	Ukraine	2	1	1	4
5	China	2	0	0	2
6	Azerbaijan	1	0	1	2
7	Kazakhstan	0	3	0	3
8	Great Britain	0	2	2	4
9	North Korea	0	1	1	2
9	Portugal	0	1	1	2
11	Belgium	0	1	0	1
12	Belarus	0	0	2	2
12	Uzbekistan	0	0	2	2
Totals (13 entries)		16	16	16	48
