= 1978 World Sports Acrobatics Championships =

3rd World Sports Acrobatics Championships
- Location: Sofia, Bulgaria
- Start date: 4 October 1978
- End date: 9 October 1978
- Competitors: 52 from 5 nations

The 1978 World Sports Acrobatics Championships were held in Sofia, Bulgaria, from 4 to 9 October 1978.

== Medal table ==
| Rank | Nation | Gold | Silver | Bronze | Total |
|---|---|---|---|---|---|
| 1 | Soviet Union | 16 | 7 | 3 | 26 |
| 2 | Bulgaria | 3 | 12 | 5 | 20 |
| 3 | Poland | 2 | 1 | 7 | 10 |
| 4 | United States | 0 | 1 | 3 | 4 |
| 5 | Germany | 0 | 0 | 4 | 4 |
| Totals (5 entries) | | 21 | 21 | 22 | 64 |

== Men's ==
=== Tumbling ===
==== Overall ====
| Rank | Gymnast | Country | Point |
|---|---|---|---|
| Gold medal | Alexander Rassolin | Soviet Union | |
| Silver medal | Igor Brikman | Soviet Union | |
| Bronze medal | Steve Elliot | United States | |

==== First exercise ====
| Rank | Gymnast | Country | Point |
|---|---|---|---|
| Gold medal | Alexander Rassolin | Soviet Union | |
| Silver medal | Steve Elliot | United States | |
| Bronze medal | Igor Brikman | Soviet Union | |

==== Second exercise ====
| Rank | Gymnast | Country | Point |
|---|---|---|---|
| Gold medal | Alexander Rassolin | Soviet Union | |
| Silver medal | Igor Brikman | Soviet Union | |
| Bronze medal | Steve Elliot | United States | |
| Bronze medal | Plamen Eftimov | Bulgaria | |

=== Group ===
==== Overall ====
| Rank | Team | Country | Point |
|---|---|---|---|
| Gold medal | | Poland | |
| Silver medal | | Soviet Union | |
| Bronze medal | | Bulgaria | |

==== First exercise ====
| Rank | Team | Country | Point |
|---|---|---|---|
| Gold medal | | Soviet Union | |
| Silver medal | | Bulgaria | |
| Bronze medal | | Poland | |

==== Second exercise ====
| Rank | Team | Country | Point |
|---|---|---|---|
| Gold medal | | Poland | |
| Silver medal | | Soviet Union | |
| Bronze medal | | Bulgaria | |

=== Pair ===
==== Overall ====
| Rank | Team | Country | Point |
|---|---|---|---|
| Gold medal | Vladimir Pochevalov, Vassily Machuga | Soviet Union | |
| Silver medal | Dimitar Russanov, Petko Petkov | Bulgaria | |
| Bronze medal | Adam Klish, Kshistof Olendrginsky | Poland | |

==== First exercise ====
| Rank | Team | Country | Point |
|---|---|---|---|
| Gold medal | Vladimir Pochevalov, Vassily Machuga | Soviet Union | |
| Silver medal | Dimitar Russanov, Petko Petkov | Bulgaria | |
| Bronze medal | Adam Klish, Kshistof Olendrginsky | Poland | |

==== Second exercise ====
| Rank | Team | Country | Point |
|---|---|---|---|
| Gold medal | Vladimir Pochevalov, Vassily Machuga | Soviet Union | |
| Silver medal | Dimitar Russanov, Petko Petkov | Bulgaria | |
| Bronze medal | Adam Klish, Kshistof Olendrginsky | Poland | |

== Mixed ==
=== Pair ===
==== Overall ====
| Rank | Team | Country | Point |
|---|---|---|---|
| Gold medal | Margarita Mollova, Dimitar Mintchev | Bulgaria | |
| Silver medal | Tatiana Kuznetsova, Viatcheslav Krivtsov | Soviet Union | |
| Bronze medal | Amy Montgomery, Jay Groves | United States | |

==== First exercise ====
| Rank | Team | Country | Point |
|---|---|---|---|
| Gold medal | Margarita Mollova, Dimitar Mintchev | Bulgaria | |
| Silver medal | Tatiana Kuznetsova, Viatcheslav Krivtsov | Soviet Union | |
| Bronze medal | Sabine Philippi, Herbert Malbach | West Germany | |

==== Second exercise ====
| Rank | Team | Country | Point |
|---|---|---|---|
| Gold medal | Margarita Mollova, Dimitar Mintchev | Bulgaria | |
| Silver medal | Tatiana Kuznetsova, Viatcheslav Krivtsov | Soviet Union | |
| Bronze medal | Sabine Philippi, Herbert Malbach | West Germany | |

== Women ==
=== Tumbling ===
==== Overall ====
| Rank | Gymnast | Country | Point |
|---|---|---|---|
| Gold medal | Ludmila Zyganova | Soviet Union | |
| Silver medal | Mella Mustafova | Bulgaria | |
| Bronze medal | Valentina Chuhareva | Soviet Union | |
| Bronze medal | Becki Handrin | United States | |

==== First exercise ====
| Rank | Gymnast | Country | Point |
|---|---|---|---|
| Gold medal | Valentina Chuhareva | Soviet Union | |
| Silver medal | Mella Mustafova | Bulgaria | |
| Bronze medal | Ludmila Zyganova | Soviet Union | |

==== Second exercise ====
| Rank | Gymnast | Country | Point |
|---|---|---|---|
| Gold medal | Ludmila Zyganova | Soviet Union | |
| Silver medal | Mella Mustafova | Bulgaria | |
| Bronze medal | Veska Atanasova | Bulgaria | |

=== Group ===
==== Overall ====
| Rank | Team | Country | Point |
|---|---|---|---|
| Gold medal | | Soviet Union | |
| Silver medal | | Bulgaria | |
| Bronze medal | | West Germany | |

==== First exercise ====
| Rank | Team | Country | Point |
|---|---|---|---|
| Gold medal | | Soviet Union | |
| Silver medal | | Bulgaria | |
| Bronze medal | | West Germany | |

==== Second exercise ====
| Rank | Team | Country | Point |
|---|---|---|---|
| Gold medal | | Soviet Union | |
| Silver medal | | Poland | |
| Bronze medal | | Bulgaria | |

=== Pair ===
==== Overall ====
| Rank | Team | Country | Point |
|---|---|---|---|
| Gold medal | Nadejda Tischtschenko, Rita Kucharenko | Soviet Union | |
| Silver medal | Stefka Gentcheva, Tania Hristova | Bulgaria | |
| Bronze medal | Eva Rucka, Eva Anerjevska | Poland | |

==== First exercise ====
| Rank | Team | Country | Point |
|---|---|---|---|
| Gold medal | Nadejda Tischtschenko, Rita Kucharenko | Soviet Union | |
| Silver medal | Stefka Gentcheva, Tania Hristova | Bulgaria | |
| Bronze medal | Eva Rucka, Eva Anerjevska | Poland | |

==== Second exercise ====
| Rank | Team | Country | Point |
|---|---|---|---|
| Gold medal | Stefka Gentcheva, Tania Hristova | Bulgaria | |
| Silver medal | Nadejda Tischtschenko, Rita Kucharenko | Soviet Union | |
| Bronze medal | Eva Rucka, Eva Anerjevska | Poland | |
