= 1988 World Sports Acrobatics Championships =

8th World Sports Acrobatics Championships
- Location: Antwerp, Belgium
- Start date: 1 December 1988
- End date: 4 December 1988
- Competitors: 61 from 8 nations

The 1988 World Sports Acrobatics Championships were held in Antwerp, Belgium, from 1 to 4 December 1988.

== Medal table ==
| Rank | Nation | Gold | Silver | Bronze | Total |
|---|---|---|---|---|---|
| 1 | Bulgaria | 12 | 1 | 3 | 16 |
| 2 | Soviet Union | 10 | 4 | 2 | 16 |
| 3 | China | 8 | 4 | 9 | 21 |
| 4 | Poland | 0 | 2 | 0 | 2 |
| 5 | United States | 0 | 1 | 2 | 3 |
| 6 | Germany | 0 | 0 | 2 | 2 |
| 6 | Great Britain | 0 | 0 | 2 | 2 |
| 8 | Hungary | 0 | 0 | 1 | 1 |
| Totals (8 entries) | | 30 | 12 | 21 | 63 |

== Men's Tumbling ==
=== Overall ===
| Rank | Team | Country | Point |
|---|---|---|---|
| Gold medal | Feng Tao | China | |
| Silver medal | Sergey Pogiba | Soviet Union | |
| Bronze medal | Steve Eliot | United States | |

=== Straight ===
| Rank | Team | Country | Point |
|---|---|---|---|
| Gold medal | Feng Tao | China | |
| Silver medal | Yordan Tzintzarcki | Bulgaria | |
| Bronze medal | Steve Eliot | United States | |

=== Twisting ===
| Rank | Team | Country | Point |
|---|---|---|---|
| Gold medal | Feng Tao | China | |
| Silver medal | Steve Eliot | United States | |
| Bronze medal | Sergey Pogiba | Soviet Union | |

=== Men's Group ===
==== Overall ====
| Rank | Team | Country | Point |
|---|---|---|---|
| Gold medal | | Soviet Union | |
| Gold medal | | China | |
| Bronze medal | | Bulgaria | |

==== Balance ====
| Rank | Team | Country | Point |
|---|---|---|---|
| Gold medal | | China | |
| Silver medal | | Soviet Union | |
| Bronze medal | | West Germany | |

==== Tempo ====
| Rank | Team | Country | Point |
|---|---|---|---|
| Gold medal | | Soviet Union | |
| Silver medal | | Poland | |
| Bronze medal | | China | |

=== Men's Pair ===
==== Overall ====
| Rank | Team | Country | Point |
|---|---|---|---|
| Gold medal | Sergey Tsigevskiy, Valeriy Liapunov | Soviet Union | |
| Silver medal | Chen Yun, Chen Baohuang | China | |
| Bronze medal | Rumen Latschkov, Nedialko Nedeltchev | Bulgaria | |

==== Balance ====
| Rank | Team | Country | Point |
|---|---|---|---|
| Gold medal | Sergey Tsigevskiy, Valeriy Liapunov | Soviet Union | |
| Gold medal | Chen Yun, Chen Baohuang | China | |
| Bronze medal | Rumen Latschkov, Nedialko Nedeltchev | Bulgaria | |

==== Tempo ====
| Rank | Team | Country | Point |
|---|---|---|---|
| Gold medal | Chen Yun, Chen Baohuang | China | |
| Silver medal | Robert Wultanski, Mariusz Polanski | Poland | |
| Bronze medal | Robert Jilg, Alexander Grassmann | West Germany | |

=== Mixed Pair ===
==== Overall ====
| Rank | Team | Country | Point |
|---|---|---|---|
| Gold medal | Miglena Bastscheva, Svetelosar Jeliaskov | Bulgaria | |
| Gold medal | Svetlana Mikhalitzheva, Yevgeniy Mikhalitzhev | Soviet Union | |
| Bronze medal | Lu Jia, Qi Lijun | China | |

==== Balance ====
| Rank | Team | Country | Point |
|---|---|---|---|
| Gold medal | Miglena Bastscheva, Svetelosar Jeliaskov | Bulgaria | |
| Gold medal | Svetlana Mikhalitzheva, Yevgeniy Mikhalitzhev | Soviet Union | |
| Bronze medal | Lu Jia, Qi Lijun | China | |

==== Tempo ====
| Rank | Team | Country | Point |
|---|---|---|---|
| Gold medal | Miglena Bastscheva, Svetelosar Jeliaskov | Bulgaria | |
| Gold medal | Svetlana Mikhalitzheva, Yevgeniy Mikhalitzhev | Soviet Union | |
| Bronze medal | Lu Jia, Qi Lijun | China | |

=== Women's Group ===
==== Overall ====
| Rank | Team | Country | Point |
|---|---|---|---|
| Gold medal | | Bulgaria | |
| Gold medal | | Soviet Union | |
| Bronze medal | | China | |

==== Balance ====
| Rank | Team | Country | Point |
|---|---|---|---|
| Gold medal | | Bulgaria | |
| Gold medal | | Soviet Union | |
| Bronze medal | | China | |

==== Tempo ====
| Rank | Team | Country | Point |
|---|---|---|---|
| Gold medal | | Bulgaria | |
| Gold medal | | Soviet Union | |
| Bronze medal | | China | |

=== Women's Pair ===
==== Overall ====
| Rank | Team | Country | Point |
|---|---|---|---|
| Gold medal | Milena Datscheva, Nikolina Koleva | Bulgaria | |
| Silver medal | Wang Li, Zang Xiurong | China | |
| Bronze medal | Alison Tout, Emma Carlisle | United Kingdom | |

==== Balance ====
| Rank | Team | Country | Point |
|---|---|---|---|
| Gold medal | Milena Datscheva, Nikolina Koleva | Bulgaria | |
| Silver medal | Marina Tkachenko, Elena Kandzuba | Soviet Union | |
| Bronze medal | Wang Li, Zang Xiurong | China | |

==== Tempo ====
| Rank | Team | Country | Point |
|---|---|---|---|
| Gold medal | Milena Datscheva, Nikolina Koleva | Bulgaria | |
| Silver medal | Wang Li, Zang Xiurong | China | |
| Bronze medal | Marina Tkachenko, Elena Kandzuba | Soviet Union | |

=== Women's Tumbling ===
==== Overall ====
| Rank | Gymnast | Country | Point |
|---|---|---|---|
| Gold medal | Maria Dimova | Bulgaria | |
| Silver medal | Yao Zhihua | China | |
| Bronze medal | Philippa Musikant | United Kingdom | |

==== Straight ====
| Rank | Gymnast | Country | Point |
|---|---|---|---|
| Gold medal | Maria Dimova | Bulgaria | |
| Silver medal | Liudmila Gromova | Soviet Union | |
| Bronze medal | Yao Zhihua | China | |

==== Twisting ====
| Rank | Gymnast | Country | Point |
|---|---|---|---|
| Gold medal | Yao Zhihua | China | |
| Gold medal | Maria Dimova | Bulgaria | |
| Bronze medal | Valeri Kis | Hungary | |
