= 1990 World Sports Acrobatics Championships =

9th World Sports Acrobatics Championships
- Location: Augsburg, Germany
- Start date: 29 October 1990
- End date: 4 November 1990
- Competitors: 58 from 8 nations

The 1990 World Sports Acrobatics Championships were held in Augsburg, Germany, from 29 October to 4 November 1990.

== Medal table ==
Rank	Nation	Gold	Silver	Bronze	Total
1	Soviet Union	17	4	1	22
2	China	7	6	6	19
3	Bulgaria	4	4	8	16
4	Great Britain	0	1	3	4
5	Poland	0	0	4	4
6	United States	0	0	2	2
7	Germany	0	0	1	1
7	Hungary	0	0	1	1
Totals (8 entries)		28	15	26	69

== Men's Tumbling ==
=== Overall ===
Rank	Team	Country	Point
Gold medal	Andrey Garbusov	Soviet Union	
Silver medal	Feng Tao	China	
Bronze medal	Chen Bo	China	
Bronze medal	Steve Elliott	United States	

=== Somersault ===
Rank	Team	Country	Point
Gold medal	Chen Bo	China	
Silver medal	Andrey Garbusov	Soviet Union	
Bronze medal	Jordan Tzintzarski	Bulgaria	

=== Twisting ===
Rank	Team	Country	Point
Gold medal	Andrey Garbusov	Soviet Union	
Silver medal	Jordan Tzintzarski	Bulgaria	
Bronze medal	Chen Bo	China	

=== Men's Group ===
==== Overall ====
Rank	Team	Country	Point
Gold medal		Soviet Union	
Silver medal		China	
Bronze medal		Bulgaria	

==== Balance ====
Rank	Team	Country	Point
Gold medal		China	
Silver medal		Soviet Union	
Silver medal		Bulgaria	

==== Tempo ====
Rank	Team	Country	Point
Gold medal		Soviet Union	
Silver medal		Bulgaria	
Bronze medal		China	

=== Men's Pair ===
==== Overall ====
Rank	Team	Country	Point
Gold medal	G. Zerizhenko, Y. Steptzhenkov	Soviet Union	
Gold medal	Chen Yun, Chen Baohuang	China	
Bronze medal	Rumen Latschkov, V. Entschev	Bulgaria	
Bronze medal	G. Godzwon, Andrzej Piechota	Poland	

==== Balance ====
Rank	Team	Country	Point
Gold medal	G. Zerizhenko, Y. Steptzhenkov	Soviet Union	
Gold medal	Chen Yun, Chen Baohuang	China	
Bronze medal	Rumen Latschkov, V. Entschev	Bulgaria	

==== Tempo ====
Rank	Team	Country	Point
Gold medal	G. Zerizhenko, Y. Steptzhenkov	Soviet Union	
Silver medal	Chen Yun, Chen Baohuang	China	
Bronze medal	G. Godzwon, Andrzej Piechota	Poland	

=== Mixed Pair ===
==== Overall ====
Rank	Team	Country	Point
Gold medal	Natalya Redkova, Yevgeniy Mertzhenko	Soviet Union	
Silver medal	Wu Xiangdong, Li Yijia	China	
Bronze medal	Beata Walentynska, Andrej Sokotowski	Poland	
Bronze medal	Sophie Harris, James Newman	United Kingdom	

==== Balance ====
Rank	Team	Country	Point
Gold medal	Natalya Redkova, Yevgeniy Mertzhenko	Soviet Union	
Silver medal	Wu Xiangdong, Li Yijia	China	
Bronze medal	M. Tzankov, M. Stefanova	Bulgaria	

==== Tempo ====
Rank	Team	Country	Point
Gold medal	Natalya Redkova, Yevgeniy Mertzhenko	Soviet Union	
Gold medal	Wu Xiangdong, Li Yijia	China	
Bronze medal	Beata Walentynska, Andrej Sokotowski	Poland	
Bronze medal	Sophie Harris, James Newman	United Kingdom	
Bronze medal	R. Herberg, S. Metzmacher	West Germany	

=== Women's Group ===
==== Overall ====
Rank	Team	Country	Point
Gold medal		Bulgaria	
Silver medal		Soviet Union	
Bronze medal		China	

==== Balance ====
Rank	Team	Country	Point
Gold medal		Bulgaria	
Silver medal		Soviet Union	
Bronze medal		China	

==== Tempo ====
Rank	Team	Country	Point
Gold medal		Bulgaria	
Gold medal		Soviet Union	
Bronze medal		China	

=== Women's Pair ===
==== Overall ====
Rank	Team	Country	Point
Gold medal	Yelena Drozhina, Sulfiya Alimova	Soviet Union	
Silver medal	Song Na, Hong Su	China	
Bronze medal	Anna Kirkovska, Jordanka Jordanova	Bulgaria	

==== Balance ====
Rank	Team	Country	Point
Gold medal	Yelena Drozhina, Sulfiya Alimova	Soviet Union	
Gold medal	Song Na, Hong Su	China	
Bronze medal	Anna Kirkovska, Jordanka Jordanova	Bulgaria	

==== Tempo ====
Rank	Team	Country	Point
Gold medal	Yelena Drozhina, Sulfiya Alimova	Soviet Union	
Gold medal	Song Na, Hong Su	China	
Bronze medal	Anna Kirkovska, Jordanka Jordanova	Bulgaria	

=== Women's Tumbling ===
==== Overall ====
Rank	Team	Country	Point
Gold medal	Natalya Kadatova	Soviet Union	
Silver medal	Maria Dimova	Bulgaria	
Bronze medal	Yekaterina Yureva	Soviet Union	

==== Somersault ====
Rank	Team	Country	Point
Gold medal	Natalya Kadatova	Soviet Union	
Silver medal	Philippa Musikant	United Kingdom	
Bronze medal	Missy Marra	United States	

==== Twisting ====
Rank	Team	Country	Point
Gold medal	Natalya Kadatova	Soviet Union	
Gold medal	Maria Dimova	Bulgaria	
Bronze medal	Philippa Musikant	United Kingdom	
Bronze medal	Diana Matus	Hungary	
