= 1997 World Sports Acrobatics Championships =

14th World Sports Acrobatics Championships
- Location: Manchester, United Kingdom
- Start date: 18 September 1997
- End date: 21 September 1997
- Competitors: 74 from 8 nations

The 1997 World Sports Acrobatics Championships were held in Manchester, United Kingdom, from 18 to 21 September 1997.

Nineteen countries sent competitors. In the tumbling competition, Kathryn Peberdy became the first woman to complete a triple back somersault at the World championships, followed by Yelena Chabanenko, who took several steps on the landing of her triple back somersault.

The event was held concurrently with a International Federation of Sports Acrobatics congress.

== Medal table ==
Rank	Nation	Gold	Silver	Bronze	Total
1	Russia	13	3	1	17
2	Ukraine	6	6	5	17
3	China	5	1	7	13
4	Great Britain	2	3	2	7
5	Belarus	1	1	0	2
6	Poland	0	2	4	6
7	France	0	1	2	3
8	Bulgaria	0	0	7	7
Totals (8 entries)		27	17	28	72

== Men's Tumbling ==
=== Overall ===
Rank	Team	Country	Point
Gold medal	V. Ignatenkov	Russia	
Silver medal	Alexei Kryjanovski	Russia	
Bronze medal	Grigoriy Duchenko	Ukraine	
Bronze medal	Chen Bo	China	

=== Straight ===
Rank	Team	Country	Point
Gold medal	V. Ignatenkov	Russia	
Silver medal	Adrian Sienkiewicz	Poland	
Bronze medal	Craig Filmer	United Kingdom	

=== Twisting ===
Rank	Team	Country	Point
Gold medal	Alexei Kryjanovski	Russia	
Silver medal	Chen Bo	China	
Bronze medal	Adrian Sienkiewicz	Poland	

=== Men's Group ===
==== Overall ====
Rank	Team	Country	Point
Gold medal	Pigorov, Vlasov, Mikrov, Ivanov	Russia	
Gold medal	Safronov, Zaverykha, Pavlov, Bain	Ukraine	
Bronze medal	Wu, Huang, Chen, Jian	China	
Bronze medal	Stefan Nikolov, Roumen Hristov, Nikolay Nikolov, Slav Danev	Bulgaria	

==== Balance ====
Rank	Team	Country	Point
Gold medal	Safronov, Zaverykha, Pavlov, Bain	Ukraine	
Silver medal	Pigorov, Vlasov, Mikrov, Ivanov	Russia	
Bronze medal	Wu, Huang, Chen, Jian	China	
Bronze medal	Stefan Nikolov, Roumen Hristov, Nikolay Nikolov, Slav Danev	Bulgaria	

==== Tempo ====
Rank	Team	Country	Point
Gold medal	Pigorov, Vlasov, Mikrov, Ivanov	Russia	
Silver medal	Pas, Zywol, Trzasska, Gutszmit	Poland	
Bronze medal	Wu, Huang, Chen, Jian	China	
Bronze medal	Safronov, Zaverykha, Pavlov, Bain	Ukraine	

=== Men's Pair ===
==== Overall ====
Rank	Team	Country	Point
Gold medal	Renjie Li, Min Song	China	
Silver medal	Vlassov, Volkov	Russia	
Bronze medal	Mark Flores, Martyn Smith	United Kingdom	
Bronze medal	Nikolov, Marinov	Bulgaria	

==== Balance ====
Rank	Team	Country	Point
Gold medal	Renjie Li, Min Song	China	
Silver medal	Mark Flores, Martyn Smith	United Kingdom	
Bronze medal	Vlassov, Volkov	Russia	
Bronze medal	Nikolov, Marinov	Bulgaria	
Bronze medal	Kozhin, Vologdin	Ukraine	

==== Tempo ====
Rank	Team	Country	Point
Gold medal	Renjie Li, Min Song	China	
Gold medal	Vlassov, Volkov	Russia	
Bronze medal	Nikolov, Marinov	Bulgaria	

=== Mixed Pair ===
==== Overall ====
Rank	Team	Country	Point
Gold medal	Oxana Iatsenko, Edouard Perelyguine	Russia	
Silver medal	Valeria Maltchenko, Dmitri Klimenko	Ukraine	
Silver medal	Emily Crocker, Neil Griffiths	United Kingdom	

==== Balance ====
Rank	Team	Country	Point
Gold medal	Oxana Iatsenko, Edouard Perelyguine	Russia	
Gold medal	Valeria Maltchenko, Dmitri Klimenko	Ukraine	
Bronze medal	Wu Zhengdan, Wei Baohua	China	

==== Tempo ====
Rank	Team	Country	Point
Gold medal	Oxana Iatsenko, Edouard Perelyguine	Russia	
Gold medal	Emily Crocker, Neil Griffiths	United Kingdom	
Bronze medal	Valeria Maltchenko, Dmitri Klimenko	Ukraine	

=== Women's Tumbling ===
==== Overall ====
Rank	Team	Country	Point
Gold medal	Kathryn Peberby	United Kingdom	
Silver medal	Yelena Chabanenko	Ukraine	
Bronze medal	Chrystel Robert	France	

==== Straight ====
Rank	Team	Country	Point
Gold medal	Tatiana Morosova	Belarus	
Silver medal	Chrystel Robert	France	
Bronze medal	Yelena Chabanenko	Ukraine	

==== Twisting ====
Rank	Team	Country	Point
Gold medal	Yelena Chabanenko	Ukraine	
Silver medal	Kathryn Peberby	United Kingdom	
Bronze medal	Chrystel Robert	France	

=== Women's Group ===
==== Overall ====
Rank	Team	Country	Point
Gold medal	Zaliaeva, Kuschu, Avakelian	Russia	
Gold medal	Moiseichea, Surina, Zherdeva	Ukraine	
Bronze medal	Silvya Chengarova, Kristina Pramatarova, Paulina Stankova	Bulgaria	
Bronze medal	Wang, Xu, Luo	China	
Bronze medal	Joanna Gamrot, Edyta Kalinovska, Marta Adamiecka	Poland	

==== Balance ====
Rank	Team	Country	Point
Gold medal	Zaliaeva, Kuschu, Avakelian	Russia	
Gold medal	Moiseichea, Surina, Zherdeva	Ukraine	
Bronze medal	Wang, Xu, Luo	China	

==== Tempo ====
Rank	Team	Country	Point
Gold medal	Zaliaeva, Kuschu, Avakelian	Russia	
Silver medal	Moiseichea, Surina, Zherdeva	Ukraine	
Bronze medal	Joanna Gamrot, Edyta Kalinovska, Marta Adamiecka	Poland	

=== Women's Pair ===
==== Overall ====
Rank	Team	Country	Point
Gold medal	Liao, Lao	China	
Silver medal	Vishnevskaya, Kovalchuk	Ukraine	
Bronze medal	Stoyanova, Penkova	Bulgaria	

==== Balance ====
Rank	Team	Country	Point
Gold medal	Liao, Lao	China	
Silver medal	Vishnevskaya, Kovalchuk	Ukraine	
Bronze medal	Sakowska, Gargala	Poland	

==== Tempo ====
Rank	Team	Country	Point
Gold medal	Karaeva, Smirnova	Russia	
Silver medal	Vishnevskaya, Kovalchuk	Ukraine	
Silver medal	Raktscheeva, Feoktistova	Belarus	
