= 1995 World Sports Acrobatics Championships =

12th World Sports Acrobatics Championships
- Location: Wrocław, Poland
- Start date: 9 November 1995
- End date: 12 November 1995
- Competitors: 68 from 9 nations

The 1995 World Sports Acrobatics Championships were held in Wrocław, Poland, from 9 to 12 November 1995.

== Medal table ==
Rank	Nation	Gold	Silver	Bronze	Total
1	Russia	10	5	2	17
2	China	8	3	3	14
3	Bulgaria	3	1	2	6
4	Poland	2	3	4	9
5	Ukraine	1	6	7	14
6	Great Britain	0	2	0	2
7	France	0	1	0	1
8	Belarus	0	0	1	1
8	Kazakhstan	0	0	1	1
Totals (9 entries)		24	21	20	65

== Men's tumbling ==
=== Overall ===
Rank	Team	Country	Point
Gold medal	V. Ignatenkov	Russia	
Gold medal	A. Kryzanovski	Russia	
Bronze medal	G. Dushenko	Ukraine	

=== Somersault ===
Rank	Team	Country	Point
Gold medal	A. Kryzanovski	Russia	
Silver medal	G. Dushenko	Ukraine	
Bronze medal	A. Kossaourov	Kazakhstan	

=== Twist ===
Rank	Team	Country	Point
Gold medal	V. Ignatenkov	Russia	
Gold medal	Bo Chen	China	
Bronze medal	A. Sienkiewicz	Poland	

=== Men's group ===
==== Overall ====
Rank	Team	Country	Point
Gold medal	Hu, Sheng, Weihuan, Zianfeng	China	
Silver medal	Gutszmit, Gutszmit, Pas, Zywiol	Poland	
Bronze medal	Ivanov, Progov, Maorov, Vlasov	Russia	
Bronze medal	Varbanov, Mihov, Ivanov, Nikolaev	Bulgaria	

==== Balance ====
Rank	Team	Country	Point
Gold medal	Hu, Sheng, Weihuan, Zianfeng	China	
Silver medal	Bain, Pavlov, Zaveryukha, Vilkovskiy	Ukraine	
Bronze medal	Gutszmit, Gutszmit, Pas, Zywiol	Poland	

==== Tempo ====
Rank	Team	Country	Point
Gold medal	Hu, Sheng, Weihuan, Zianfeng	China	
Silver medal	Gutszmit, Gutszmit, Pas, Zywiol	Poland	
Bronze medal	Varbanov, Mihov, Ivanov, Nikolaev	Bulgaria	

=== Men's pair ===
==== Overall ====
Rank	Team	Country	Point
Gold medal	Renjie Li, Min Song	China	
Silver medal	Berezoni, Ilienko	Russia	
Bronze medal	Nychyporuk, Rudenko	Ukraine	

==== Balance ====
Rank	Team	Country	Point
Gold medal	Renjie Li, Min Song	China	
Silver medal	Berezoni, Ilienko	Russia	
Bronze medal	Nychyporuk, Rudenko	Ukraine	

==== Tempo ====
Rank	Team	Country	Point
Gold medal	Renjie Li, Min Song	China	
Silver medal	Marinov, Nikolov	Bulgaria	
Silver medal	Nychyporuk, Rudenko	Ukraine	

=== Mixed pair ===
==== Overall ====
Rank	Team	Country	Point
Gold medal	Katzov, Todorova	Bulgaria	
Silver medal	Griffiths, Crocker	United Kingdom	
Bronze medal	Tia, Guan	China	

==== Balance ====
Rank	Team	Country	Point
Gold medal	Katzov, Todorova	Bulgaria	
Silver medal	Tia, Guan	China	
Bronze medal	Iatsenko, Kniazev	Russia	

==== Tempo ====
Rank	Team	Country	Point
Gold medal	Katzov, Todorova	Bulgaria	
Silver medal	Griffiths, Crocker	United Kingdom	
Bronze medal	Tia, Guan	China	

=== Women's group ===
==== Overall ====
Rank	Team	Country	Point
Gold medal	Dan, Xu, Xiaoi	China	
Silver medal	Eremina, Mironiviz, Senchikhina	Ukraine	
Bronze medal	Kowalczyk, Sztarbala, Zarychta	Poland	

==== Balance ====
Rank	Team	Country	Point
Gold medal	Souvorova, Sviridova, Kouchou	Russia	
Gold medal	Eremina, Mironiviz, Senchikhina	Ukraine	
Bronze medal	Kowalczyk, Sztarbala, Zarychta	Poland	

==== Tempo ====
Rank	Team	Country	Point
Gold medal	Souvorova, Sviridova, Kouchou	Russia	
Silver medal	Dan, Xu, Xiaoi	China	
Bronze medal	Eremina, Mironiviz, Senchikhina	Ukraine	

=== Women's pair ===
==== Overall ====
Rank	Team	Country	Point
Gold medal	Fjolek, Sakowska	Poland	
Silver medal	Bakhvalova, Kottis	Russia	
Bronze medal	Antipova, Redkovolosova	Ukraine	

==== Balance ====
Rank	Team	Country	Point
Gold medal	Bakhvalova, Kottis	Russia	
Silver medal	Antipova, Redkovolosova	Ukraine	
Silver medal	Fjolek, Sakowska	Poland	

==== Tempo ====
Rank	Team	Country	Point
Gold medal	Fjolek, Sakowska	Poland	
Silver medal	Bakhvalova, Kottis	Russia	
Bronze medal	Antipova, Redkovolosova	Ukraine	
Bronze medal	Mei, Haigiong	China	

=== Women's tumbling ===
==== Overall ====
Rank	Team	Country	Point
Gold medal	T. Paniivan	Russia	
Silver medal	I. Garina	Russia	
Bronze medal	T. Morozova	Belarus	

==== Somersault ====
Rank	Team	Country	Point
Gold medal	I. Garina	Russia	
Silver medal	C. Robert	France	
Bronze medal	O. Tchabanenko	Ukraine	

==== Twist ====
Rank	Team	Country	Point
Gold medal	T. Paniivan	Russia	
Silver medal	Zhu Huan	China	
Silver medal	O. Tchabanenko	Ukraine	
