= 1996 World Sports Acrobatics Championships =

13th World Sports Acrobatics Championships
- Location: Riesa, Germany
- Start date: 30 September 1996
- End date: 7 October 1996
- Competitors: 70 from 10 nations

The 1996 World Sports Acrobatics Championships were held in Riesa, Germany, from 30 September to 7 October 1996.

== Medal table ==
Rank	Nation	Gold	Silver	Bronze	Total
1	China	8	5	3	16
2	Russia	8	4	3	15
3	Ukraine	8	2	5	15
4	Bulgaria	3	4	0	7
5	Poland	0	1	3	4
6	Great Britain	0	1	2	3
7	Azerbaijan	0	1	0	1
7	Kazakhstan	0	1	0	1
7	South Africa	0	1	0	1
10	Belarus	0	0	3	3
Totals (10 entries)		27	20	19	66

== Men's Tumbling ==
=== Overall ===
Rank	Team	Country	Point
Gold medal	V. Ignatenkov	Russia	
Silver medal	T. Mogotsi	South Africa	
Bronze medal	Yuri Pedorenko	Ukraine	
Bronze medal	Grigoriy Duchenko	Ukraine	

=== Straight ===
Rank	Team	Country	Point
Gold medal	A. Kryschanovski	Russia	
Silver medal	A. Duchno	Kazakhstan	
Bronze medal	A. Sienkiewicz	Poland	

=== Twisting ===
Rank	Team	Country	Point
Gold medal	V. Ignatenkov	Russia	
Silver medal	Bo Chen	China	
Bronze medal	Yuri Pedorenko	Ukraine	

=== Men's Group ===
==== Overall ====
Rank	Team	Country	Point
Gold medal	Menshega, Zolotuchin, Plotnikov, Volodin	Russia	
Gold medal	Nikolov, Guergieve, Nikolov, Danev	Bulgaria	
Bronze medal	Ouyannikov, Osyannikov, Kiyanitsa, Lucko	Ukraine	

==== Balance ====
Rank	Team	Country	Point
Gold medal	Nikolov, Guergieve, Nikolov, Danev	Bulgaria	
Silver medal	Menshega, Zolotuchin, Plotnikov, Volodin	Russia	
Silver medal	Pas, Zywiol, Gutszmit, Gutszmit	Poland	

==== Tempo ====
Rank	Team	Country	Point
Gold medal	Ouyannikov, Osyannikov, Kiyanitsa, Lucko	Ukraine	
Silver medal	Nikolov, Guergieve, Nikolov, Danev	Bulgaria	
Silver medal	Danev, Elshan, Alexsandr, Valeri	Azerbaijan	

=== Men's Pair ===
==== Overall ====
Rank	Team	Country	Point
Gold medal	Renjie Li, Min Song	China	
Silver medal	Rudenkov, Nechiporuk	Ukraine	
Bronze medal	Mark Flores, Martyn Smith	United Kingdom	

==== Balance ====
Rank	Team	Country	Point
Gold medal	Renjie Li, Min Song	China	
Silver medal	Rudenkov, Nechiporuk	Ukraine	
Silver medal	Mark Flores, Martyn Smith	United Kingdom	
Silver medal	Iljenko, Bereshnoi	Russia	

==== Tempo ====
Rank	Team	Country	Point
Gold medal	Renjie Li, Min Song	China	
Gold medal	Iljenko, Bereshnoi	Russia	
Bronze medal	Rudenkov, Nechiporuk	Ukraine	

=== Mixed Pair ===
==== Overall ====
Rank	Team	Country	Point
Gold medal	Yazenko, Kniyasev	Russia	
Silver medal	Katzon, Todorova	Bulgaria	
Silver medal	Lu, Lu	China	

==== Balance ====
Rank	Team	Country	Point
Gold medal	Yazenko, Kniyasev	Russia	
Gold medal	Katzon, Todorova	Bulgaria	
Bronze medal	Lu, Lu	China	

==== Tempo ====
Rank	Team	Country	Point
Gold medal	Guridova, Ignatienko	Ukraine	
Silver medal	Katzon, Todorova	Bulgaria	
Bronze medal	Lu, Lu	China	
Bronze medal	Yazenko, Kniyasev	Russia	

=== Women's Group ===
==== Overall ====
Rank	Team	Country	Point
Gold medal	Ji, Zhou, Wang	China	
Gold medal	Moiseicheva, Surina, Zherdeva	Ukraine	
Bronze medal	Gamrot, Kalinowska, Adamiecka	Poland	

==== Balance ====
Rank	Team	Country	Point
Gold medal	Ji, Zhou, Wang	China	
Gold medal	Moiseicheva, Surina, Zherdeva	Ukraine	
Bronze medal	Suvorova, Kuschu, Arakelyan	Russia	

==== Tempo ====
Rank	Team	Country	Point
Gold medal	Ji, Zhou, Wang	China	
Gold medal	Moiseicheva, Surina, Zherdeva	Ukraine	
Bronze medal	Gamrot, Kalinowska, Adamiecka	Poland	

=== Women's Pair ===
==== Overall ====
Rank	Team	Country	Point
Gold medal	Chen, Liang	China	
Silver medal	Karaeva, Smirnova	Russia	
Bronze medal	Rakcheyeva, Feokystova	Belarus	

==== Balance ====
Rank	Team	Country	Point
Gold medal	Chen, Liang	China	
Silver medal	Betovska, Ignatova	Bulgaria	
Bronze medal	Karaeva, Smirnova	Russia	

==== Tempo ====
Rank	Team	Country	Point
Gold medal	Tatarenko, Senchishina	Ukraine	
Silver medal	Chen, Liang	China	
Bronze medal	Rakcheyeva, Feokystova	Belarus	

=== Women's Tumbling ===
==== Overall ====
Rank	Team	Country	Point
Gold medal	E. Chabanenko	Ukraine	
Silver medal	I. Garina	Russia	
Bronze medal	Huang Zhu	China	

==== Straight ====
Rank	Team	Country	Point
Gold medal	T. Paniyvan	Russia	
Silver medal	Huang Zhu	China	
Bronze medal	T. Morosova	Belarus	

==== Twisting ====
Rank	Team	Country	Point
Gold medal	E. Chabanenko	Ukraine	
Silver medal	Huang Zhu	China	
Bronze medal	K. Peberdy	United Kingdom	
