= Yevgeny Marchenko (gymnast) =

American artistic gymnastics coach

- Born: Kazakhstan
- Occupation: Gymnastics Coach
- Organization: WOGA
- Awards: Merited Master of Sport of the USSR

Yevgeny Marchenko (born 24 February 1964) is a Latvian-American artistic gymnastics coach, known for being the personal coach to Carly Patterson, who was the 2004 Olympic All-Around champion. He is of Russian descent.

== Early years ==
Marchenko was born in Kazakhstan and competed in sports acrobatics gymnastics. During his career, he garnered five World champion titles, four European champion titles, and the Soviet national title.

== Coaching career ==
Marchenko and close lifelong friend, Valeri Liukin, moved to the United States following their retirements from Gymnastics. They had the intent of opening their own gym in New Orleans, Louisiana until a chance visit from a friend who wanted to see them in Plano, Texas. After seeing potential business opportunities in Texas, Marchenko and Liukin saved up and managed to afford their own gymnastics facility in Plano; and during the opening week, 140 gymnasts signed up to join.

Marchenko has served as the personal coach to Carly Patterson, Hollie Vise and Ava Verdeflor in the past.

== Awards ==
- Merited Master of Sport of the USSR
- International Coach of the Year - 2001-04
