= 1976 World Sports Acrobatics Championships =

2nd World Sports Acrobatics Championships
- Location: Saarbrücken, West Germany
- Start date: 20 September 1976
- End date: 25 September 1976
- Competitors: 52 from 4 nations

The 1976 World Sports Acrobatics Championships were held in Saarbrücken, West Germany, from 20 to 25 September 1976.

== Medal table ==
Rank	Nation	Gold	Silver	Bronze	Total
1	Soviet Union	18	9	0	27
2	Germany	6	0	2	8
3	Poland	2	9	5	16
4	Bulgaria	1	10	13	24
Totals (4 entries)		27	28	20	75

== Results ==
=== Men's Tumbling ===
==== Overall ====
Rank	Gymnast	Country	Point
Gold medal	Yuri Zikunov	Soviet Union	
Silver medal	Bindler Vadim	Soviet Union	
Bronze medal	Stanislav Vigas	Poland	

==== First Exercise ====
Rank	Gymnast	Country	Point
Gold medal	Bindler Vadim	Soviet Union	
Silver medal	Yuri Zikunov	Soviet Union	
Bronze medal	Stanislav Vigas	Poland	

==== Second Exercise ====
Rank	Gymnast	Country	Point
Gold medal	Yuri Zikunov	Soviet Union	
Silver medal	Bindler Vadim	Soviet Union	
Bronze medal	Rosen Dimov	Bulgaria	

=== Men's Single Pedestal ===
==== Overall ====
Rank	Gymnast	Country	Point
Gold medal	Günter Faier	West Germany	
Silver medal	Todor Baikov	Bulgaria	
Bronze medal	No medal awarded		

==== First Exercise ====
Rank	Gymnast	Country	Point
Gold medal	Günter Faier	West Germany	
Silver medal	Todor Baikov	Bulgaria	
Bronze medal	No medal awarded		

==== Second Exercise ====
Rank	Gymnast	Country	Point
Gold medal	Günter Faier	West Germany	
Silver medal	Todor Baikov	Bulgaria	
Bronze medal	No medal awarded		

=== Men's Pair ===
==== Overall ====
Rank	Team	Country	Point
Gold medal	Vladimir Alimanov, Vladimir Nazarov	Soviet Union	
Silver medal	Kiril Kirov, Dragomir Draganov	Bulgaria	
Bronze medal	Tadeusz Vojtkoviak, Bronislav Dziurla	Poland	

==== First Exercise ====
Rank	Team	Country	Point
Gold medal	Vladimir Alimanov, Vladimir Nazarov	Soviet Union	
Silver medal	Kiril Kirov, Dragomir Draganov	Bulgaria	
Bronze medal	Tadeusz Vojtkoviak, Bronislav Dziurla	Poland	

==== Second Exercise ====
Rank	Team	Country	Point
Gold medal	Vladimir Alimanov, Vladimir Nazarov	Soviet Union	
Silver medal	Tadeusz Vojtkoviak, Bronislav Dziurla	Poland	
Bronze medal	Kiril Kirov, Dragomir Draganov	Bulgaria	

=== Men's Group ===
==== Overall ====
Rank	Team	Country	Point
Gold medal		Poland	
Silver medal		Soviet Union	
Bronze medal		Bulgaria	

==== First Exercise ====
Rank	Team	Country	Point
Gold medal		Soviet Union	
Silver medal		Poland	
Bronze medal		Bulgaria	

==== Second Exercise ====
Rank	Team	Country	Point
Gold medal		Poland	
Silver medal		Soviet Union	
Bronze medal		Bulgaria	

=== Women's Tumbling ===
==== Overall ====
Rank	Gymnast	Country	Point
Gold medal	Ludmila Zyganova	Soviet Union	
Silver medal	Nadeja Masloboischtschikova	Soviet Union	
Bronze medal	Mariana Marinova	Bulgaria	

==== First Exercise ====
Rank	Gymnast	Country	Point
Gold medal	Ludmila Zyganova	Soviet Union	
Silver medal	Nadeja Masloboischtschikova	Soviet Union	
Bronze medal	Mariana Marinova	Bulgaria	

==== Second Exercise ====
Rank	Gymnast	Country	Point
Gold medal	Nadeja Masloboischtschikova	Soviet Union	
Silver medal	Ludmila Zyganova	Soviet Union	
Bronze medal	Mariana Marinova	Bulgaria	

=== Women's Single Pedestal ===
==== Overall ====
Rank	Gymnast	Country	Point
Gold medal	Karin König	West Germany	
Silver medal	Valentina Petrova	Bulgaria	
Bronze medal	No medal awarded		

==== First Exercise ====
Rank	Gymnast	Country	Point
Gold medal	Karin König	West Germany	
Silver medal	Valentina Petrova	Bulgaria	
Bronze medal	No medal awarded		

==== Second Exercise ====
Rank	Gymnast	Country	Point
Gold medal	Karin König	West Germany	
Silver medal	Valentina Petrova	Bulgaria	
Bronze medal	No medal awarded		

=== Women's Pair ===
==== Overall ====
Rank	Team	Country	Point
Gold medal	Nadejda Tischtschenko, Rita Kucharenko	Soviet Union	
Silver medal	Zofia Jablonska, Maria Noga	Poland	
Bronze medal	Doris Jung, Karin Jung	West Germany	

==== First Exercise ====
Rank	Team	Country	Point
Gold medal	Nadejda Tischtschenko, Rita Kucharenko	Soviet Union	
Silver medal	Zofia Jablonska, Maria Noga	Poland	
Bronze medal	Doris Jung, Karin Jung	West Germany	

==== Second Exercise ====
Rank	Team	Country	Point
Gold medal	Nadejda Tischtschenko, Rita Kucharenko	Soviet Union	
Silver medal	Zofia Jablonska, Maria Noga	Poland	
Bronze medal	Doris Jung, Karin Jung	West Germany	

=== Women's Group ===
==== Overall ====
Rank	Team	Country	Point
Gold medal		Soviet Union	
Silver medal		Bulgaria	
Bronze medal		Poland	

==== First Exercise ====
Rank	Team	Country	Point
Gold medal		Soviet Union	
Silver medal		Poland	
Bronze medal		Bulgaria	

==== Second Exercise ====
Rank	Team	Country	Point
Gold medal		Bulgaria	
Silver medal		Soviet Union	
Silver medal		Poland	

=== Mixed Pair ===
==== Overall ====
Rank	Team	Country	Point
Gold medal	Tatjana Krivzova, Vjacheslav Kusnezov	Soviet Union	
Silver medal	Malgorzata Kotkiewicz, Grzegorz Kowalczyk	Poland	
Bronze medal	Yanka Petrova, Rusko Harizanov	Bulgaria	

==== First Exercise ====
Rank	Team	Country	Point
Gold medal	Tatjana Krivzova, Vjacheslav Kusnezov	Soviet Union	
Silver medal	Malgorzata Kotkiewicz, Grzegorz Kowalczyk	Poland	
Bronze medal	Yanka Petrova, Rusko Harizanov	Bulgaria	

==== Second Exercise ====
Rank	Team	Country	Point
Gold medal	Tatjana Krivzova, Vjacheslav Kusnezov	Soviet Union	
Silver medal	Malgorzata Kotkiewicz, Grzegorz Kowalczyk	Poland	
Bronze medal	Yanka Petrova, Rusko Harizanov	Bulgaria	
