= 1984 World Sports Acrobatics Championships =

6th World Sports Acrobatics Championships
- Location: Sofia, Bulgaria
- Start date: 2 October 1984
- End date: 8 October 1984
- Competitors: 72 from 7 nations

The 1984 World Sports Acrobatics Championships were held in Sofia, Bulgaria, from 2 to 8 October 1984.

== Medal table ==
Rank	Nation	Gold	Silver	Bronze	Total
1	Soviet Union	17	5	1	23
2	Bulgaria	8	6	3	17
3	China	0	9	7	16
4	Poland	0	2	9	11
5	Hungary	0	0	2	2
6	Great Britain	0	0	1	1
6	United States	0	0	1	1
Totals (7 entries)		25	22	24	71

== Men's Tumbling ==
=== Overall ===
Rank	Gymnast	Country	Point
Gold medal	I. Brikman	Soviet Union	
Silver medal	A. Mareydo	Soviet Union	
Bronze medal	Fun Tao	China	

=== First Exercise ===
Rank	Gymnast	Country	Point
Gold medal	I. Brikman	Soviet Union	
Silver medal	Fun Tao	China	
Bronze medal	W. Zabiesowscki	Poland	

=== Second Exercise ===
Rank	Gymnast	Country	Point
Gold medal	A. Mareydo	Soviet Union	
Silver medal	N. Nedelkov	Bulgaria	
Bronze medal	W. Zabiesowscki	Poland	

=== Men's Group ===
==== Overall ====
Rank	Team	Country	Point
Gold medal		Soviet Union	
Silver medal		Bulgaria	
Bronze medal		China	

==== First Exercise ====
Rank	Team	Country	Point
Gold medal		Soviet Union	
Silver medal		Bulgaria	
Bronze medal		China	
Bronze medal		Poland	

==== Second Exercise ====
Rank	Team	Country	Point
Gold medal		Soviet Union	
Silver medal		China	
Bronze medal		Bulgaria	

=== Men's Pair ===
==== Overall ====
Rank	Team	Country	Point
Gold medal	Sergey Tsigevskiy, Valeriy Liapunov	Soviet Union	
Silver medal	J. Anachkov, S. Boyadjiev	Bulgaria	
Bronze medal	Hu Fufen, Li Shaowen	China	

==== First Exercise ====
Rank	Team	Country	Point
Gold medal	Sergey Tsigevskiy, Valeriy Liapunov	Soviet Union	
Silver medal	Hu Fufen, Li Shaowen	China	
Bronze medal	K. Dlendrzynski, A. Klis	Poland	

==== Second Exercise ====
Rank	Team	Country	Point
Gold medal	Sergey Tsigevskiy, Valeriy Liapunov	Soviet Union	
Silver medal	J. Anachkov, S. Boyadjiev	Bulgaria	
Bronze medal	K. Dlendrzynski, A. Klis	Poland	

=== Mixed Pair ===
==== Overall ====
Rank	Team	Country	Point
Gold medal	S. Grozdova, E. Mikhalichev	Soviet Union	
Silver medal	E. Lubcheva, D. Minchev	Bulgaria	
Bronze medal	M. Wilk, J. Wiecek	Poland	

==== First Exercise ====
Rank	Team	Country	Point
Gold medal	S. Grozdova, E. Mikhalichev	Soviet Union	
Gold medal	E. Lubcheva, D. Minchev	Bulgaria	
Silver medal	M. Wilk, J. Wiecek	Poland	
Silver medal	S. Ligan, M. Hehua	China	
Bronze medal	C. Vanloo, A. Brown	United States	

==== Second Exercise ====
Rank	Team	Country	Point
Gold medal	S. Grozdova, E. Mikhalichev	Soviet Union	
Silver medal	S. Ligan, M. Hehua	China	
Bronze medal	E. Lubcheva, D. Minchev	Bulgaria	

=== Women's Group ===
==== Overall ====
Rank	Team	Country	Point
Gold medal		Soviet Union	
Gold medal		Bulgaria	
Silver medal		China	
Bronze medal		United Kingdom	

==== First Exercise ====
Rank	Team	Country	Point
Gold medal		Soviet Union	
Gold medal		Bulgaria	
Silver medal		China	
Bronze medal		Hungary	

==== Second Exercise ====
Rank	Team	Country	Point
Gold medal		Soviet Union	
Gold medal		Bulgaria	
Silver medal		China	
Bronze medal		Poland	

=== Women's Pair ===
==== Overall ====
Rank	Team	Country	Point
Gold medal	S. Kostova, I. Bakalova	Bulgaria	
Silver medal	D. Chwalbogowska, B. Wyrzykowska	Poland	
Bronze medal	E. Bogdanova, I. Suzdalova	Soviet Union	

==== First Exercise ====
Rank	Team	Country	Point
Gold medal	S. Kostova, I. Bakalova	Bulgaria	
Silver medal	E. Bogdanova, I. Suzdalova	Soviet Union	
Bronze medal	D. Chwalbogowska, B. Wyrzykowska	Poland	
Bronze medal	M. Katona, E. Foldi	Hungary	

==== Second Exercise ====
Rank	Team	Country	Point
Gold medal	S. Kostova, I. Bakalova	Bulgaria	
Silver medal	L. Siaoen, L. Meifan	China	
Bronze medal	D. Chwalbogowska, B. Wyrzykowska	Poland	

=== Women's Tumbling ===
==== Overall ====
Rank	Gymnast	Country	Point
Gold medal	L. Gromova	Soviet Union	
Silver medal	E. Bugaeva	Soviet Union	
Bronze medal	P. Nenova	Bulgaria	

==== First Exercise ====
Rank	Gymnast	Country	Point
Gold medal	L. Gromova	Soviet Union	
Silver medal	E. Bugaeva	Soviet Union	
Bronze medal	M. Juifen	China	
Bronze medal	Z. Yibo	China	

==== Second Exercise ====
Rank	Gymnast	Country	Point
Gold medal	P. Nenova	Bulgaria	
Silver medal	L. Gromova	Soviet Union	
Bronze medal	Z. Yibo	China	
