= 1999 Junior World Acrobatic Gymnastics Championships =

The 1999 Junior World Sports Acrobatics Championships was the sixth edition of the junior acrobatic gymnastics competition, then named sports acrobatics, and took place in Nowa Ruda, Poland, from October 7 to 9, 1999. The competition was organized by the International Gymnastics Federation.

== Medal summary ==
=== Results ===
Event	Gold	Silver	Bronze
Men's pair all-around	Russia	Lithuania	Ukraine
Men's pair balance	Russia	Bulgaria	Belarus
Men's pair tempo	Ukraine	Lithuania	Bulgaria
Women's pair all-around	Ukraine	Belgium	Russia
Women's pair balance	Ukraine	United States	Russia
Women's pair tempo	Ukraine	Belgium	Russia
Mixed pair all-around	Russia China	—	United Kingdom
Mixed pair balance	Russia	China	Poland
Mixed pair tempo	Russia	China	United States
Men's group all-around	Russia	Ukraine	Bulgaria
Men's group balance	Russia	Bulgaria	Ukraine
Men's group tempo	Russia	Bulgaria	China
Women's group all-around	Russia	China	Ukraine
Women's group balance	China	Russia	Ukraine
Women's group tempo	Belarus	Russia	China
Team	Russia	Ukraine	United Kingdom
