= 1993 Junior World Acrobatic Gymnastics Championships =

The 1993 Junior World Sports Acrobatics Championships was the third edition of the acrobatic gymnastics competition, then named sports acrobatics, and took place in Moscow, Russia, from April 8 to 10, 1993. The competition was organized by the International Federation of Sports Acrobatics (IFSA).

== Medal summary ==
=== Results ===
Event	Gold	Silver	Bronze
Men's tumbling all-around	(Russia) Andrei Polonets	(Russia) Dmitrii Ishchenko	(Poland) Adrian Sienkievicz
Men's tumbling somersault	(Russia) Dmitrii Ishchenko	(Russia) Andrei Polonets	(Poland) Adrian Sienkievicz
Men's tumbling twist	(Russia) Dmitrii Ishchenko	(Russia) Andrei Polonets	(United States) Harris Rayshine
Women's tumbling all-around	(Russia) Tatiana Paniyvan	(Belarus) Tatiana Morozova (Russia) Irina Garina	—
Women's tumbling somersault	(Russia) Tatiana Paniyvan	(Belarus) Tatiana Morozova	(Bulgaria) Dlaga Brainova
Women's tumbling twist	(Ukraine) Natalia Proseniuk	(Belarus) Tatiana Morozova	(Russia) Irina Garina
Men's pair all-around	Russia	China	North Korea
Men's pair balance	China	Russia	North Korea
Men's pair tempo	China	North Korea	Ukraine
Women's pair all-around	Russia United Kingdom	—	Ukraine
Women's pair balance	Russia United Kingdom	—	Ukraine
Women's pair tempo	United Kingdom	Russia	Ukraine
Mixed pair all-around	China	Ukraine	Russia
Mixed pair balance	China	Ukraine	Russia
Mixed pair tempo	China Ukraine	—	Russia
Men's group all-around	Azerbaijan	Ukraine	Russia
Men's group balance	Azerbaijan	Russia	Ukraine
Men's group tempo	Azerbaijan	Ukraine	Russia
Women's group all-around	Russia	China	Germany Bulgaria
Women's group balance	Russia	China	Bulgaria
Women's group tempo	Russia	China	Ukraine
