= 1991 Junior World Acrobatic Gymnastics Championships =

The 1991 Junior World Sports Acrobatics Championships was the second edition of the acrobatic gymnastics competition, then named sports acrobatics, and took place in Beijing, China, from September 26 to September 28, 1991. The competition was organized by the International Federation of Sports Acrobatics (IFSA).

== Medal summary ==
=== Results ===
| Event | Gold | Silver | Bronze |
|---|---|---|---|
| Men's tumbling all-around | (China) Bo Chen | (China) Zhou Techang | (United States) Raachan Sampson |
| Men's tumbling somersault | (China) Bo Chen | (United States) Rayshine Harris | (United Kingdom) Adam Janes |
| Men's tumbling twist | (United States) Raachan Sampson | (United Kingdom) Adam Janes | (Australia) Daniel Moore |
| Women's tumbling all-around | (France) Chrystel Robert | (China) Wang Xiangqi | (Japan) Aya Nakamura |
| Women's tumbling somersault | (China) Dang Linlin (France) Chrystel Robert | — | (Japan) Aya Nakamura |
| Women's tumbling twist | (France) Chrystel Robert | (China) Wang Xiangqi | (Japan) Aya Nakamura (Bulgaria) Mery Samouilova |
| Men's pair all-around | China | West Germany | — |
| Men's pair balance | China | West Germany | — |
| Men's pair tempo | China | West Germany | — |
| Women's pair all-around | Bulgaria China | — | United Kingdom |
| Women's pair balance | China | Bulgaria | United States |
| Women's pair tempo | Bulgaria | China | United Kingdom Japan |
| Mixed pair all-around | United Kingdom | China | United States |
| Mixed pair balance | China | United Kingdom | United States |
| Mixed pair tempo | United Kingdom | United States | China |
| Men's group all-around | China | West Germany | — |
| Men's group balance | China | West Germany | — |
| Men's group tempo | China | West Germany | — |
| Women's group all-around | Bulgaria China | — | West Germany |
| Women's group balance | China | Bulgaria | West Germany |
| Women's group tempo | China | West Germany | United Kingdom |
