= 1995 Junior World Acrobatic Gymnastics Championships =

The 1995 Junior World Sports Acrobatics Championships was the fourth edition of the acrobatic gymnastics competition, then named sports acrobatics, and took place in Riesa, Germany, from May 27 to 28, 1995. The competition was organized by the International Federation of Sports Acrobatics (IFSA).

== Medal summary ==
=== Results ===
Event	Gold	Silver	Bronze
Men's tumbling all-around	(Russia) Eugenie Neuerov	(Russia) Yurii Karmanov	(Ukraine) Aleksandr Klementiev
Men's tumbling somersault	(Russia) Eugenie Neuerov	(Ukraine) Aleksandr Klementiev	(China) Keyu Xu
Men's tumbling twist	(Russia) Yurii Karmanov	(United Kingdom) Andrew Griffiths	(China) Keyu Xu
Women's tumbling all-around	(Russia) Viktoria Danilkina	(Russia) Elena Bluzhina	(Kazakhstan) Tatiana Yevdokimova
Women's tumbling somersault	(Russia) Elena Bluzhina	(Kazakhstan) Tatiana Yevdokimova	(Belgium) Sigy van Renterghem
Women's tumbling twist	(Russia) Viktoria Danilkina	(France) Marlene Bayet	(Belgium) Sigy van Renterghem
Men's pair all-around	United Kingdom	Russia	China
Men's pair balance	United Kingdom	Bulgaria Ukraine	—
Men's pair tempo	Russia	United Kingdom	Lithuania
Women's pair all-around	Ukraine	Poland	Russia
Women's pair balance	Ukraine	Bulgaria Poland	—
Women's pair tempo	Poland	Russia	Belarus
Mixed pair all-around	Russia	Ukraine	China Germany
Mixed pair balance	China	Russia	Germany Ukraine
Mixed pair tempo	Ukraine	Russia	China
Men's group all-around	Ukraine	Russia	Poland
Men's group balance	Ukraine	Russia	Kazakhstan Poland
Men's group tempo	Ukraine	Russia	Poland
Women's group all-around	Ukraine	Bulgaria	Poland
Women's group balance	Bulgaria	Ukraine	China
Women's group tempo	Ukraine	Bulgaria Poland	—
Team	Russia	Ukraine	Poland
