= 1997 Junior World Acrobatic Gymnastics Championships =

The 1997 Junior World Sports Acrobatics Championships was the fifth edition of the acrobatic gymnastics competition, then named sports acrobatics, and took place in Honolulu, Hawaii, United States, from May 29 to 31, 1997. The competition was organized by the International Federation of Sports Acrobatics (IFSA).

== Medal summary ==
=== Results ===
Event	Gold	Silver	Bronze
Men's tumbling all-around	(Russia) Denis Serdiukov	(Belarus) Igor Adamenkov	(United Kingdom) Ross Gibson
Men's tumbling somersault	(Kazakhstan) Roman Lastovsky	(United Kingdom) Ross Gibson (Belarus) Igor Adamenkov	—
Men's tumbling twist	(Russia) Denis Serdiukov	(Kazakhstan) Roman Lastovsky	(China) Yong Deng
Women's tumbling all-around	(Ukraine) Kristina Zheleznyak	(Ukraine) Olena Dribna	(Russia) Valeria Schukina
Women's tumbling somersault	(Ukraine) Olena Dribna	(France) Alexandra Dutarte	(United Kingdom) Leigh Rugman
Women's tumbling twist	(Russia) Valeria Schukina	(Ukraine) Kristina Zheleznyak	(Kazakhstan) Oksana Borissyuk
Men's pair all-around	Ukraine	China	Russia
Men's pair balance	Ukraine	China	Russia
Men's pair tempo	China	Russia	Ukraine
Women's pair all-around	Russia	United Kingdom	Ukraine
Women's pair balance	Russia	Ukraine	United Kingdom
Women's pair tempo	United Kingdom	Russia	Ukraine
Mixed pair all-around	Ukraine	China	Russia
Mixed pair balance	China	Ukraine	Germany
Mixed pair tempo	Ukraine	China	Russia
Men's group all-around	Russia	Poland	Kazakhstan
Men's group balance	Russia	Poland	Kazakhstan
Men's group tempo	Poland	Russia	China Kazakhstan
Women's group all-around	Ukraine Russia	—	Poland
Women's group balance	Ukraine Russia	—	Poland
Women's group tempo	Ukraine	Russia	Poland
Team	Russia Ukraine	—	United Kingdom
