= 1989 Junior World Acrobatic Gymnastics Championships =

The 1989 Junior World Sports Acrobatics Championships was the first edition of the acrobatic gymnastics competition, then named sports acrobatics, and took place in Katowice, Poland, from December 1 to December 3, 1989. The competition was organized by the International Federation of Sports Acrobatics (IFSA).

== Medal summary ==
=== Results ===
Event	Gold	Silver	Bronze
Men's tumbling all-around	(Soviet Union) Viktor Fedulov	(Soviet Union) Elgudza Chetaguri	(Bulgaria) Atanas Nedialkov
Men's tumbling somersault	(Soviet Union) Viktor Fedulov	(Bulgaria) Atanas Nedialkov (United Kingdom) Adam Janes	—
Men's tumbling twist	(Soviet Union) Elgudza Chetaguri	(Bulgaria) Stefan Dimitrov (China) Bo Chen	—
Women's tumbling all-around	(Soviet Union) Irina Chernilevskaya	(Soviet Union) Natalia Kadatova	(China) Hao Huang
Women's tumbling somersault	(Soviet Union) Natalia Kadatova	(Soviet Union) Galia Totchkova	(Hungary) Diana Matus
Women's tumbling twist	(Soviet Union) Irina Chernilevskaya	(Hungary) Diana Matus	(United Kingdom) Kathryn Tracey
Men's pair all-around	China	Poland	Soviet Union
Men's pair balance	China Soviet Union	—	Poland
Men's pair tempo	China	Poland	Soviet Union
Women's pair all-around	Poland	Hungary	Soviet Union
Women's pair balance	Soviet Union	Hungary	Poland
Women's pair tempo	Bulgaria	Soviet Union	Poland
Mixed pair all-around	Bulgaria Soviet Union	—	China
Mixed pair balance	Bulgaria Soviet Union	—	China Poland
Mixed pair tempo	Bulgaria	Soviet Union	China
Men's group all-around	Bulgaria	China	Soviet Union
Men's group balance	Bulgaria	Soviet Union	China
Men's group tempo	China	Bulgaria	Poland
Women's group all-around	Bulgaria	Soviet Union	China
Women's group balance	Bulgaria	Soviet Union	China
Women's group tempo	Bulgaria China	—	Poland
