= Arina Nikishova =

Russian rhythmic gymnast

- Full name: Arina Nikishova
- Nickname: Dasha
- Born: March 16, 1997 (age 29) Voronezh, Voronezh Oblast, Russia

Gymnastics career
- Discipline: Rhythmic gymnastics, aesthetic group gymnastics
- Country represented: Russia
- Head coaches: Natalia Orlova, Ekaterina Dementieva
Medal record
Representing Russia
Rhythmic gymnastics
Summer Universiade
Gold medal – first place	2015 Gwangju	Group All-around
Gold medal – first place	2015 Gwangju	5 Ribbons
Bronze medal – third place	2015 Gwangju	6 Clubs + 2 Hoops
Aesthetic group gymnastics
World Championships
Silver medal – second place	2017 Helsinki	Senior Final
Bronze medal – third place	2018 Budapest	Senior Final
European Championships
Gold medal – first place	2017 Sofia	Senior Final
Bronze medal – third place	2018 Tallinn	Senior Final
World Cup Final
Bronze medal – third place	2017 Chicago	Senior Overall
Bronze medal – third place	2018 Santos	Senior Overall

Arina Nikishova (Russian: Арина Никишова, born March 16, 1997, in Moscow, Russia) is a Russian Group rhythmic and aesthetic group gymnast. She is the 2015 Summer Universiade Group All-around gold medalist and the 2017 European champion in aesthetic group gymnastics.
