= Emmi Nikkilä =

Finnish aesthetic group gymnast

- Full name: Emmi Roosa Nikkilä
- Born: 20 October 1999 (age 26) Helsinki, Finland

Gymnastics career
- Discipline: Aesthetic group gymnastics
- Country represented: Finland (2013-2021)
- Club: Tampereen Sisu
- Gym: Ikuri Sports hall, Tampere
- Head coaches: Titta Heikkilä, Teija Kukkala
- Choreographer: Antton Laine
Medal record
Aesthetic group gymnastics
Representing Finland
Event	1st	2nd	3rd
World Championships	3	3	0
European Championships	1	3	0
Junior World Championships	0	1	0
World Cup Final	1	3	0
Challenge Cup Final	0	2	0
Total	5	11	0
World Championships
Gold medal – first place	2021 Helsinki	Senior Final
Gold medal – first place	2017 Helsinki	Senior Final
Gold medal – first place	2015 Tórshavn	Senior Final
Silver medal – second place	2019 Cartagena	Senior Final
Silver medal – second place	2018 Budapest	Senior Final
Silver medal – second place	2016 Brno	Senior Final
Silver medal – second place	2013 Sofia	Junior Final
European Championships
Gold medal – first place	2016 Tartu	Senior Final
Silver medal – second place	2021 Moscow	Senior Final
Silver medal – second place	2018 Tallinn	Senior Final
Silver medal – second place	2017 Sofia	Senior Final
World Cup Final
Gold medal – first place	2017 Chicago	Senior Overall
Silver medal – second place	2018 Santos	Senior Overall
Silver medal – second place	2016 Barcelona	Senior Overall
Silver medal – second place	2015 Tampere	Senior Overall

Emmi Nikkilä (born 20 October 1999) is a Finnish aesthetic group gymnast. She is a six-time (2015 - 2020) Finnish National champion in Aesthetic group gymnastics competing with Team Minetit. She is a three-time (2015, 2017, 2021) AGG World champion and the 2016 AGG European champion.
