= Riina Ruismäki =

Finnish aesthetic group gymnast

- Full name: Riina Rebekka Ruismäki
- Born: 11 March 2001 (age 25) Helsinki, Finland

Gymnastics career
- Discipline: Aesthetic group gymnastics
- Country represented: Finland; (2015-present)
- Club: Tampereen Sisu
- Gym: Ikuri Sports hall, Tampere
- Head coaches: Titta Heikkilä, Teija Kukkala
- Choreographer: Antton Laine
Medal record
Aesthetic group gymnastics
Representing Finland
Event	1st	2nd	3rd
World Championships	0	2	0
European Championships	0	2	0
Junior World Championships	1	0	0
World Cup Final	1	1	0
Total	2	5	0
World Championships
Gold medal – first place	2017 Helsinki	Junior Final
Silver medal – second place	2019 Cartagena	Senior Final
Silver medal – second place	2018 Budapest	Senior Final
European Championships
Silver medal – second place	2018 Tallinn	Senior Final
Silver medal – second place	2017 Sofia	Senior Final
World Cup Final
Gold medal – first place	2017 Chicago	Senior Overall
Silver medal – second place	2018 Santos	Senior Overall

Riina Ruismäki (born 11 March 2001) is a Finnish aesthetic group gymnast. She is a three-time (2018–2020) Finnish National champion in Aesthetic group gymnastics competing with Team Minetit. She is the 2017 AGG Junior World champion.

== Career ==
She started competing in aesthetic group gymnastics in club Tapanilan Erä with team Alexa. They won gold medals at the 2013 and 2014 Finnish National Championship in category 12–14 years.

In 2015, she joined junior team Elite in cooperation of club Tapanilan Erä and Sport Club Vantaa. She attended her fist Challenge Cup, where they finished 4th in Junior category, only 0,45 points away from podium. They won bronze medal at Finnish National Championship in junior category the same year. Later, they competed at the 2015 Junior World Championships in Tórshavn, Faroe Islands. Team ended on 7th place in Preliminaries and did not advance into the finals due to 2 teams per country rule.

In 2016, they competed at three Challenge Cup events: in Estonia, Bulgaria and Spain. They won bronze medal again at Finnish National Championship in junior category and qualified to the 2016 Junior World Championships in Brno, Czech Republic. The team fall apart in autumn that year.

In 2017, Riina and some members of Elite Junior team formed a co-operation team with the Minetit Juniors of Tampereen Voimistelijat called Minetit Elite. They won gold medals at Challenge Cups in Tartu and Padua. On national level, they became the 2017 Finnish Junior National champions. They also won gold medal at the 2017 Junior World Championships in Helsinki, Finland.

In summer she stepped into the senior category and joined senior team Minetit. They won silver medals at World Cup Chicago and at the 2017 European Championships in Sofia, Bulgaria. They kept the autumn program for spring season in 2018.

Next year, they won gold medal at World Cup Vantaa and silver at World Cup Graz. They also won silver medal at the 2018 World Championships in Budapest, Hungary.
