= 2026 Aesthetic Group Gymnastics World Cup series =

Gymnastics competition series

The 2026 IFAGG World Cup series in Aesthetic Group Gymnastics is a series of competitions officially organized and promoted by the International Federation of Aesthetic Group Gymnastics (IFAGG).

Russian and Belarusian teams competed under a neutral flag until the end of May 2026. Following a decision by the IFAGG Council on 29 May 2026, all remaining sanctions were lifted, allowing athletes and teams from both countries to compete under their national flags and use their national anthems once again.

== Formats ==
World and Challenge Cup
Date	Event	Location
March 27-29	World and Challenge Cup I	(Armenia) Yerevan
May 1-3	World and Challenge Cup II	(France) Goussainville
June 12-14	World and Challenge Cup III	(Kazakhstan) Astana
October 22–26	World and Challenge Cup Finals	(Hungary) Budapest

== Medal winners ==
=== World Cup ===
Competitions	Gold	Silver	Bronze
World Cup
Yerevan	IFAGG Expressia	IFAGG Madonna	(Finland) Gloria
Goussainville	IFAGG Expressia	(Finland) Minetit	IFAGG Madonna
Astana	(Russia) Expressia	(Finland) Minetit	(Russia) Madonna
Budapest	(Russia) Expressia	(Russia) Madonna	(Bulgaria) National team
Budapest	(Russia) Expressia	(Russia) Madonna	(Finland) Minetit

=== Challenge Cup ===
Competitions	Gold	Silver	Bronze
Challenge Cup
Yerevan	IFAGG Victoria	IFAGG Madonna Junior	(Estonia) Rebasesabad Junior
Goussainville	IFAGG Victoria	IFAGG Victoria Strela	(Finland) Minetit Junior
Astana	(Russia) Madonna Junior	(Finland) Minetit Junior	(Russia) Nebesa
Budapest	(Russia) Madonna Junior	(Finland) Minetit Junior	(Bulgaria) National team

== Overall medal table ==
Rank	Nation	Gold	Silver	Bronze	Total
1	RGF	4	3	1	8
2	Russia (RUS)	4	1	2	7
3	Finland (FIN)	0	4	3	7
4	Bulgaria (BUL)	0	0	2	2
5	Estonia (EST)	0	0	1	1
Totals (5 entries)		8	8	9	25

== See also ==
- 2026 World Aesthetic Group Gymnastics Championships
