= Miss Valentine =

Gymnastics tournament in Estonia

Miss Valentine is an international gymnastics tournament in Tartu, Estonia. The event was first held in 1995 and, as of 2023, has been hosted annually. The event hosts rhythmic gymnastics and aesthetic group gymnastics competitions. In 2021, because of the COVID-19 pandemic in Europe, Miss Valentine was hosted as an online competition due to the arena where the event traditionally happens being turned into a temporary vaccination center.

== Aesthetic group gymnastics ==
Miss Valentine hosted stages of the Aesthetic Group Gymnastics World Cup series in 2014, 2015 and 2017.

== Rhythmic gymnastics ==
In 2013, for the first time Miss Valentine hosted a Rhythmic Gymnastics World Cup stage. In 2020, Miss Valentine served as the third stage of the Rhythmic Gymnastics Grand Prix series. It was the first time that the Nordic and Baltic regions received a Grand Prix stage. In 2022, 2023, 2024, 2025 and 2026 the event was also part of the Grand Prix series.

Winners:

2026: (Ukraine) Taisiia Onofriichuk 2025: (Ukraine) Taisiia Onofriichuk 2024: (Ukraine) Viktoriia Onopriienko 2023: (Ukraine) Viktoriia Onopriienko 2022: (Belarus) Alina Harnasko 2021: --- 2020: (Russia) Arina Averina 2019: (Russia) Maria Sergeeva

== See also ==
- Rhythmic Gymnastics European Championships
