= Anastasia Rogozhina =

Finnish rhythmic gymnast

- Nickname: Ana
- Born: 26 August 2008 (age 18) Ylöjärvi, Finland

Gymnastics career
- Discipline: Rhythmic gymnastics, Aesthetic group gymnastics
- Country represented: Finland; (2022 - present)
- Club: Tampereen Sisu
- Gym: Ikuri Sports Hall
- Head coach: Jouki Tikkanen
- Assistant coach: Titta Heikkilä
Medal record
Aesthetic group gymnastics
Representing Finland
European Championships
Bronze medal – third place	2021 Moscow	Junior Final

Anastasia Rogozhina (born 26 August 2008) is a Finnish individual rhythmic gymnast and former aesthetic group gymnast. On the national level, she is the 2023 Finnish Junior all-around champion.

== Career ==
Up until 2021, she simultaneously competed in rhythmic gymnastics and aesthetic group gymnastics. In 2019, she was part of Team Minetit 10-12 age group. They competed at the IFAGG Trophy in Cartagena, Spain and won the bronze medal.

=== Junior ===
In 2021, she was part of Minetit Junior team, which competed at the 2021 European Championships in Aesthetic Group Gymnastics in Moscow, Russia, and took the bronze medal in the Junior category.

In rhythmic gymnasts, she won the bronze medal in the all-around at the Junior National Championships as well as silver in the hoop and clubs finals.

In 2022, she was the silver medalist in the all-around at the Junior National Championships, and she also won four medals in the event finals (gold with ball and bronze with clubs, hoop and ribbon). She represented Finland at the 2022 Junior European Championships in Tel Aviv, Israel, where she took 8th place in the team competition. She placed 16th in ribbon qualifications.

In 2023, she became the Finnish Junior champion in all-around, hoop, ball and clubs and won silver in ribbon. She competed at the 2023 Junior World Championships with ball and clubs and placed 17th in the team competition.

=== Senior ===
She turned senior in 2024. In March, she won silver medal in all-around and gold in team at the Nordic Championships in Finland. In May, she won the bronze medal in the all-around at the Finnish National championships. She also won gold in the hoop and clubs finals and bronze in the ball and ribbon finals. She represented Finland at the 2024 European Championships in Budapest, Hungary, together with teammate Emmi Piiroinen. She finished in 23rd place in the all-around qualifications and advanced into the finals, where she ended in 22nd. She competed at the Grand Prix Final in Brno, Czech Republic and ended in 12th place in the all-around. She also qualified to two apparatus finals, finishing 6th in both the ball and clubs finals.

In 2025, she competed at Miss Valentine in Tartu, Estonia. Rogozhina and her teammate Lia Kallio won the bronze medal in the FIG senior team competition. She also won bronze in the clubs final and was 4th in the hoop final. In late March, she competed at the Grand Prix Thiais. She took 13th place in all-around and qualified for two apparatus finals, finishing 8th in both. In May, she won bronze medal in the all-around at the Finnish National championships. In finals, she got gold with clubs, silver with hoop and bronze with ball and ribbon. Later, she competed at Portimao World Challenge Cup and took 25th place in all-around. In July she made her World Cup debut at Milan World Cup, placing 41st in all-around.

Rogozhina started her 2026 season competing at Tartu Grand Prix, finishing on 16th place in all-around. She qualified to clubs final and ended on 8th place. In March, she won silver medal in all-around and gold in team at the Nordic Championships in Farum, Denmark. She competed at Sofia World Cup and took 34th place in all-around. Next, she competed at Tashkent World Cup and took 56th place in all-around. She took 7th place in clubs final at Gdynia Rhythmic Stars. In May, she won bronze medal in the all-around at the Finnish National championships. She won silver in hoop and ribbon and bronze medals in ball and clubs finals. In September, she finished on 12th place in all-around at Brno Grand Prix..

== Routine music information ==
Year	Apparatus	Music title
2026	Hoop	
2026	Ball	"Best Friend" by Sofi Tukker
2026	Clubs	"Code of the Sword" by The Flight
2026	Ribbon	"Carol of the Bells" by Lindsey Stirling
2025	Hoop	"Tango" by Dianne Reeves, Raul Midon / "El Conquistador" by Maxime Rodriguez
2025	Ball	"Best Friend" by Sofi Tukker
2025	Clubs	"Beauty Song" by Shigeru Umebayashi & Bi Xiaodi
2025	Ribbon	"Carol of the Bells" by Lindsey Stirling
2024	Hoop	"Tango" by Dianne Reeves, Raul Midon / "El Conquistador" by Maxime Rodriguez
2024	Ball	"L'oiseau et l'enfant (Live)" by Kids United
2024	Clubs	"Beauty Song" by Shigeru Umebayashi & Bi Xiaodi
2024	Ribbon	"Malaguena" by Brian Setzer
2023	Hoop	"Quiteria And Basilio" from Don Quixote by Sofia National Opera Orchestra
2023	Ball	"L'oiseau et l'enfant (Live)" by Kids United
2023	Clubs	"Sid's Sing-A-Long" from Ice Age: The Meltdown by John Powell
2023	Ribbon	unknown
