= Daria Dubova =

Russian rhythmic gymnast (born 1999)

- Full name: Daria Vadimovna Dubova
- Nickname: Dasha
- Born: January 29, 1999 (age 27) Voronezh, Voronezh Oblast, Russia

Gymnastics career
- Discipline: Rhythmic gymnastics, aesthetic group gymnastics
- Country represented: Russia (2013-2014)
- Club: Dinamo Dmitrov
- Gym: Novogorsk
- Head coach: Irina Viner
- Assistant coach: Anna Shumilova
- Choreographer: E.Yakovleva
Medal record
Representing Russia
Rhythmic gymnastics
Junior European Championships
| Gold medal – first place | 2013 Vienna | Group All-around |
| Gold medal – first place | 2013 Vienna | 5 Hoops |
Youth Olympic Games
| Gold medal – first place | 2014 Nanjing | Group All-around |
Aesthetic group gymnastics
World Championships
| Bronze medal – third place | 2018 Budapest | Senior Final |
European Championships
| Bronze medal – third place | 2018 Tallinn | Senior Final |
World Cup Final
| Bronze medal – third place | 2018 Santos | Senior Overall |

Daria Vadimovna Dubova (Russian: Дарья Вадимовна Дубова, born January 29, 1999, in Voronezh, Russia) is a former Russian Group rhythmic gymnast. She is the 2014 Youth Olympic Group all-around champion and the 2013 European Junior Group all-around champion.

== Gymnastics career ==
A former individual gymnast, Dubova has competed at the 2013 Russian Junior Championships finishing 13th in the all-around, she was coached by Anna Shumilova. Dubova later began competing in group and was a member of Russian Group that competed at the 2013 European Junior Championships with Russia taking the gold medal scoring a total of (33.916) ahead of Belarus (32.700) and Bulgaria (32.532) in the all-around competition. They won another gold medal in 5 hoops final.

In 2014, Dubova was recovering from injury at the start of the season. On August 26–27, Dubova replaced Karina Katyuhina who broke her leg a week before start of the competition. Dubova rejoined the Russian Group (with Daria Anenkova, Victoria Ilina, Sofya Skomorokh, Natalia Safonova) that competed at the 2014 Youth Olympic Games in Nanjing, China where they won gold in Group All-around finals.

In 2015, Dubova was added to Russia's National Reserve Team as a senior gymnast.

In 2018, she switched from rhythmic gymnastics to aesthetic group gymnastics and started competing for Russian team Expressia. They won bronze medal at the 2018 World Championships in Budapest, Hungary.
