= 2019 Aesthetic Group Gymnastics World Cup series =

Gymnastics competition series

The 2019 IFAGG World Cup series in Aesthetic Group Gymnastics is a series of competitions officially organized and promoted by the International Federation of Aesthetic Group Gymnastics.

== Formats ==
World and Challenge Cup
Date	Event	Location
March 09-10	World and Challenge Cup I	(Bulgaria) Sofia
April 03-04	World and Challenge Cup II	Singapore
October 19-20	World and Challenge Cup III	(Estonia) Tallinn
November 23-24	World and Challenge Cup IV	(Hungary) Budapest

== Medal winners ==
=== World Cup ===
Competitions	Gold	Silver	Bronze
World Cup
Sofia	(Finland) OVO Team	(Russia) Madonna	(Finland) Minetit
Singapore	(Russia) Madonna	(Finland) Minetit	(Finland) OVO Team
Tallinn	(Russia) Madonna	(Finland) Minetit	(Finland) OVO Team
Budapest	(Russia) Madonna	(Russia) Expressia	(Finland) OVO Team

=== Challenge Cup ===
Competitions	Gold	Silver	Bronze
Challenge Cup
Vantaa	(Russia) Victoria	(Russia) Victoria Strela	(Bulgaria) National team
Singapore	(Russia) Victoria Strela	(Russia) Victoria	(Finland) OVO Junior Team
Tallinn	(Russia) Victoria Strela	(Russia) Victoria	(Finland) OVO Junior Team
Budapest	(Russia) Victoria	(Finland) OVO Junior Team	(Russia) Victoria Strela

== Final ranking ==
=== World Cup ===
Rank	Team	World Cup I	World Cup II	World Cup III	World Cup IV	Total
1	Madonna (Russia)	11	12	12	18	42
2	OVO Team (Finland)	12	10	10	15	37
3	Minetit (Finland)	10	11	11	13,5	35,5
4	Expressia (Russia)	9	9	9	16,5	34,5
5	Rytmika Elite (Estonia)	8	7	8	12	28
6	Ardor (Italy)	3	4	7	10,5	21,5
7	Janika Elite (Estonia)	7	6	0	0	13
8	Ciutat de Barcelona Alcon (Spain)	6	0	5	0	11
9	Alcor Avangard (Ukraine)	0	0	0	9	9
9	Team Japan	0	8	0	0	8
10	Ritmica Cartagena (Spain)	5	0	0	0	5
11	Elina Elite (Denmark)	4	0	0	0	4

=== Challenge Cup ===
Rank	Team	World Cup I	World Cup II	World Cup III	World Cup IV	Total
1	Victoria (Russia)	12	11	11	18	40
2	Victoria Strela (Russia)	11	12	12	15	39
3	OVO Junior team (Finland)	9	10	10	16,5	36,5
4	National team (Bulgaria)	10	0	9	13,5	32,5
5	Grisete (Estonia)	7	8	8	10,5	26,5
6	Minetit Elite (Finland)	8	9	0	0	17
7	Elite (Finland)	0	0	0	9	9
8	National Team (United States)	0	3	5	0	8

Note: Only three best results count.

== Overall medal table ==
Rank	Nation	Gold	Silver	Bronze	Total
1	Russia (RUS)	7	5	1	13
2	Finland (FIN)	1	3	6	10
3	Bulgaria (BUL)	0	0	1	1
Totals (3 entries)		8	8	8	24

== See also ==
- 2019 World Aesthetic Group Gymnastics Championships
