= RGF =

RGF may refer to:

- Romanian Gymnastics Federation
- Russian Gymnastics Federation
