= Russian Gymnastics Federation (disambiguation) =

Russian Gymnastics Federation can refer to:

- Russian Gymnastics Federation
- Artistic Gymnastics Federation of Russia
- Russian Rhythmic Gymnastics Federation
