= 2021 Aesthetic Group Gymnastics World Cup series =

International gymnastics competition

The 2021 IFAGG World Cup series in Aesthetic Group Gymnastics is a series of competitions officially organized and promoted by the International Federation of Aesthetic Group Gymnastics.

== Formats ==
World and Challenge Cup
Date	Event	Location
May 13-17	World and Challenge Cup I	(Russia) Moscow
June 25-27	World and Challenge Cup II	(Bulgaria) Sofia
October 22-24	World and Challenge Cup III	(Australia) Sydney

== Medal winners ==
=== World Cup ===
Competitions	Gold	Silver	Bronze
World Cup
Moscow	Russia; Madonna	Finland; Minetit	Russia; Amuazh
Sofia	Bulgaria; National team junior	Finland; OVO Team	Finland; Gloria
Sydney			

=== Challenge Cup ===
Competitions	Gold	Silver	Bronze
Challenge Cup
Moscow	Russia; Victoria	Estonia; Siidisabad	Finland; Minetit Junior
Sofia	Bulgaria; National team junior	Estonia; Siidisabad	Ukraine; Grand Victory
Sydney			

== Overall medal table ==
Rank	Nation	Gold	Silver	Bronze	Total
1	Russia (RUS)	2	0	1	3
2	Bulgaria (BUL)	2	0	0	2
3	Finland (FIN)	0	2	2	4
4	Estonia (EST)	0	2	0	2
5	Ukraine (UKR)	0	0	1	1
Totals (5 entries)		4	4	4	12
