= Sofya Skomorokh =

Russian rhythmic gymnast

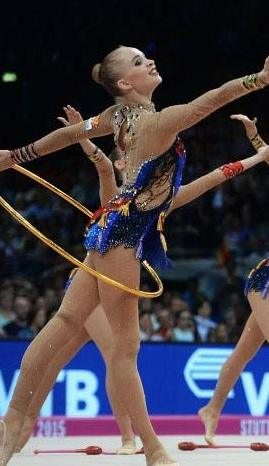
- Skomorokh in 2015

Personal information
- Full name: Sofya Pavlovna Skomorokh
- Nickname: Sonya
- Born: August 18, 1999 (age 27) Omsk, Omsk Oblast, Russia

Gymnastics career
- Discipline: Rhythmic gymnastics
- Country represented: Russia; (2013 - present)
- Club: Gazprom
- Gym: Novogorsk
- Head coach: Irina Viner / Tatiana Sergaeva
- Assistant coach: Vera Shtelbaums
- Choreographer: Olga Markatanova
Medal record
Group Rhythmic Gymnastics
Representing Russia
World Championships
Gold medal – first place	2015 Stuttgart	Group All-around
Gold medal – first place	2015 Stuttgart	6 Clubs + 2 Hoops
Silver medal – second place	2015 Stuttgart	5 Ribbons
European Games
Gold medal – first place	2015 Baku	Group All-Around
Gold medal – first place	2015 Baku	5 Ribbons
Youth Olympic Games
Gold medal – first place	2014 Nanjing	Group All-Around
Junior European Championships
Gold medal – first place	2013 Vienna	Group All-around
Gold medal – first place	2013 Vienna	5 Hoops

Sofya Pavlovna Skomorokh (Russian: Софья Павловна Скоморох, born August 18, 1999, in Omsk, Russia) is a Russian Group rhythmic gymnast. She is the 2015 Worlds Group all-around champion, the 2015 European Games Group all-around champion. On the junior level, she is the 2014 Youth Olympic Group all-around champion and the 2013 European Junior Group all-around champion.

== Junior ==
Skomorokh started gymnastics at an early age in city of Omsk, the hometown of former gymnast greats (Evgenia Kanaeva, Irina Tchachina, Galima Shugurova, Tatiana Druchinina and Ksenia Dudkina). Skomorokh was member of Russian Group that competed at the 2013 European Junior Championships with Russia taking the gold medal scoring a total of (33.916) ahead of Belarus (32.700) and Bulgaria (32.532) in the all-around competition. They won another gold medal in 5 hoops final.

In 2014, Skomorokh competed with the Russian Group at the 2014 Moscow Grand Prix taking gold in Group all-around, following their placement, the Russian Group earned a qualification to compete for the Youth Olympic Games. On August 26–27, Skomorokh was member the Russian Group competing (with Daria Anenkova, Daria Dubova, Victoria Ilina, Natalia Safonova) at the 2014 Youth Olympic Games in Nanjing, China where they won gold in Group All-around finals.

== Senior ==
In the 2015 season, Skomorokh joined the Russian Senior Group A, she began competing in the Grand Prix and World Cup series. Skomorokh was member of the Russian Group that won gold at the inaugural 2015 European Games, they took gold in Group all-around and 5 Ribbons. At the 2015 World Cup Budapest, Skomorokh with the Russian Group won gold in Group all-around, 5 Ribbons and bronze in 6 clubs/2 Hoops. In the next competition, at the 2015 Sofia World Cup, Skomorokh with the Russian Group swept then gold in the all-around, 5 ribbons and 6 clubs / 2 Hoops. At the 2015 World Cup series in Kazan, Skomorokh together with members of the Russian Group won the gold medal in Group all-around. In event finals, they also won gold in 5 ribbons and 6 clubs / 2 hoops. On September 9–13, Skomorokh together with other members of Russian Group (Diana Borisova, Daria Kleshcheva, Anastasia Maksimova, Anastasiia Tatareva and Maria Tolkacheva) competed at the 2015 World Championships in Stuttgart where they won the Group all-around title, eight years after the Russian Group last won the all-around title in 2007. In apparatus finals, they won gold in 6 Clubs / 2 Hoop and silver in 5 Ribbons.

In 2016, Skomorokh was out of competitions early in the season as she broke her leg in practice. She underwent an operation and spent the remaining months in recovery, thus ending her quest for a spot as a member of the Russian Group at the 2016 Rio Olympics.

In 2017, Skomorokh rejoined the Russian national group after recovering from her surgery. She competed with the Russian Group at the 2017 Grand Prix Moscow where they won gold in Group all-around, 3 balls + 2 ropes and a silver medal in 5 hoops.
