= 2025 European Aesthetic Group Gymnastics Championships =

International gymnastics competition

- Venue: Mészáros Ferenc Sportcsarnok
- Location: Budapest, Hungary
- Start date: 19 September 2025
- End date: 21 September 2025

The 2025 European Aesthetic Group Gymnastics Championships, the 6th edition, was held in Budapest, Hungary, from September 19 to 21, 2025 at the Mészáros Ferenc Sportcsarnok.

The event was originally scheduled to take place in Belgrade in June, but was rescheduled and relocated due to unforeseen circumstances in Serbia. The competition was organized alongside the IFAGG Grand Prix and a B-category international competition, following adjustments made by the International Federation of Aesthetic Group Gymnastics (IFAGG) to the event calendar.

== Participating nations ==
- Austria
- Belgium
- Bulgaria
- Czech Republic
- Cyprus
- Denmark
- Estonia
- Finland
- France
- Greece
- Hungary
- Italy
- Luxembourg
- Serbia
- Ukraine
- IFAGG (Note: Under the Court of Arbitration for Sport ban, Russia may not use its name, flag, or anthem and must present themselves as "Neutral Athlete" or "Neutral Team" at any world championships. Thus, Russian (and Belarusian) gymnasts competed under a modified flag and the name "IFAGG".) (Note: Following the advice of IOC President Thomas Bach on the issue of the safety of athletes from Russia and Belarus, the IFAGG Council decided to prevent the teams from Russia and Belarus from participating in the 2022 World Championships and the 2023 European Championships. The IFAGG president described the decision as "fatal because for the athletes life is sports, and the competitions are the basis of sports", but emphasized that it was necessary in order to safeguard cooperation with other sports organizations and to maintain the pathway towards Olympic recognition.)

== Schedule ==
September 20 Saturday

- 14:30-15:00 Opening Ceremony
- 15:00-20:00 Junior & Senior Preliminaries

September 21 Sunday

- 15:00-18:30 Junior & Senior Finals
- 19:00-20:00 Award ceremony

== Medal winners ==
Event	Gold	Silver	Bronze
Senior Final	The National Team Bulgaria Karina Neykova, Siana Tabakova, Maria Mehlemova, Yana Staykova, Sibila Karpacheva, Viktoria Berova, Hristiana Kovacheva, Katrin Taseva	Expressia IFAGG Arina Ivanova, Vasilisa Gavrilova, Polina Kostiuchenko, Daria Loktionova, Angelina Sheichuk, Kamilla Rasshchupkina, Anastasia Potapova, Polina Evteeva, Amina Shigapova	Madonna IFAGG Ekaterina Davydova, Anastasiia Kuznetsova, Vitalia Malysheva, Alisa Remez, Anastasia Zolina, Mariia Zauer, Vitalina Khorina, Angelina Shnaider, Anastasia Iakimovich

Event	Gold	Silver	Bronze
Junior Final	Madonna Junior IFAGG Anastasiia Alekseeva, Ruslana Brusanova, Angelina Kalaidzhian, Maria Mitroshina, Kseniia Khrapunkova, Polina Petrova, Maria Volodina, Valeriia Troiniakova, Sofia Pletneva	National Team Bulgaria Linoy Georieva, Daria Nacheva, Jaklin Naydenova, Dalia Ivanova, Nikol Zlatkova, Andrea Sarafova, Andera Hristova	Victoria IFAGG Olesia Stepanova, Arina Kulgina, Viktoria Slesareva, Kristina Dorokhova, Elizaveta Chaplygina, Malika Abramova, Aleksandra Miasnikova

== Results ==
=== Senior ===
The top 12 teams (2 per country) and the host country in Preliminaries qualify to the Finals.

Place	Nation	Name	Preliminaries	Final	Total
1	Bulgaria	The National Team	28.600 (1)	28.600 (1)	57.200
2	IFAGG	Expressia	28.150 (2)	28.450 (2)	56.600
3	IFAGG	Madonna	27.750 (4)	27.950 (3)	55.700
4	Finland	Minetit	27.850 (3)	27.750 (4)	55.600
5	Estonia	Rebasesabad	27.000 (6)	27.350 (5)	54.350
6	Finland	OVO Team	26.900 (7)	26.800 (6)	53.700
7	Bulgaria	Academic	26.400 (10)	26.050 (7)	52.450
8	IFAGG	Silfida	24.800 (11)	25.550 (8)	50.350
9	Czech Republic	Prague AGG Team Thunder	24.750 (12)	25.050 (9)	49.800
10	Czech Republic	SK MG Mantila Brno Smilles	24.550 (13)	24.350 (10)	48.900
11	Estonia	Esperanza	23.550 (14)	22.850 (11)	46.400
12	Ukraine	Aelita Team	22.550 (15)	21.900 (12)	44.450
13	IFAGG	Nebesa	27.050 (5)	–	27.050
14	IFAGG	Gloria	26.650 (8)	–	26.650
15	Finland	Sirius	26.550 (9)	–	26.550
16	Ukraine	Avangard	22.450 (16)	–	22.450
17	Ukraine	Sky	22.350 (17)	–	22.350
18	Austria	Prestige	22.000 (18)	–	22.000
19	Italy	Pro Recco Gym	21.850 (19)	–	21.850
20	Estonia	Melissa	21.150 (20)	–	21.150
21	France	Esperanza Team Elite	20.800 (21)	–	20.800
22	Belgium	Hope Stars Belgium	20.050 (22)	–	20.050
23	Bulgaria	Velbajd	19.650 (23)	–	19.650
24	Hungary	Queens	19.050 (24)	–	19.050
25	Hungary	Team Balance	16.700 (25)	–	16.700

== Medal table ==
Rank	Nation	Gold	Silver	Bronze	Total
1	RGF	1	1	2	4
2	Bulgaria (BUL)	1	1	0	2
Totals (2 entries)		2	2	2	6
