= Gymnastics at the 2014 Summer Youth Olympics – Girls' rhythmic group all-around =

The girls' rhythmic group all-around at the 2014 Summer Youth Olympics was held on August 26–27 at the Nanjing Olympic Sports Centre.

Each group consists of five gymnasts who all perform in each routine. There are two rounds, one preliminary and one final, with each round consisting of two routines. In the preliminary, each group completes one routine using 5 hoops and one routine using 10 clubs. The four groups with the highest combined scores in the two routines advance to the final. There, they perform the two routines again. Scores from the preliminary will not be carried over, and the group starts back their routines with maximum of D10/E10 in base value.

== Medalists ==
Gold	Silver	Bronze
Russia; Daria Anenkova; Daria Dubova; Victoria Ilina; Natalia Safonova; Sofya Skomorokh	Bulgaria; Elena Bineva; Aleksandra Mitrovich; Emiliya Radicheva; Sofiya Rangelova; Gabriela Stefanova	Kazakhstan; Viktoriya Guslyakova; Amina Kozhakhat; Nuray Kumarova; Darya Medvedeva; Aliya Moldakhmetova

== Qualification ==
Rank	Team	5 Hoops	10 Clubs	Total	Notes
1	Russia	14.750	14.900	29.650	Q
2	Bulgaria	14.450	14.750	29.200	Q
3	Uzbekistan	13.100	11.600	24.700	Q
4	Kazakhstan	11.300	12.000	23.300	Q
5	Canada	11.250	11.300	22.550	R
6	Egypt	11.200	10.725	21.925	R

== Final ==
Rank	Team	5 Hoops	10 Clubs	Total
Gold medal	Russia; Daria Anenkova; Daria Dubova; Victoria Ilina; Natalia Safonova; Sofya Skomorokh	14.700	14.850	29.550
Silver medal	Bulgaria; Elena Bineva; Aleksandra Mitrovich; Emiliya Radicheva; Sofiya Rangelova; Gabriela Stefanova	13.700	13.350	27.050
Bronze medal	Kazakhstan; Viktoriya Guslyakova; Amina Kozhakhat; Nuray Kumarova; Darya Medvedeva; Aliya Moldakhmetova	12.300	12.750	25.050
4	Uzbekistan; Sabrina Ramazanova; Gyuzal Raymanova; Komilabonu Rustamova; Irina Saleh; Karina Tagaeva	11.850	12.850	24.700
