= Victoria Ilina =

Russian rhythmic gymnast (born 1999)

- Full name: Victoria Valeryevna Sorokina Ilina
- Born: March 28, 1999 (age 27) Saransk, Mordovia, Russia

Gymnastics career
- Discipline: Rhythmic gymnastics
- Country represented: Russia
- Club: Gazprom
- Gym: Novogorsk
- Head coach: Irina Viner
- Assistant coach: Natalia Kukushkina
- Choreographer: Mikhail Pervykh
- Retired: yes
Medal record
Rhythmic gymnastics
Representing Russia
Junior European Championships
Gold medal – first place	2013 Vienna	Group All-around
Gold medal – first place	2013 Vienna	5 Hoops
Youth Olympic Games
Gold medal – first place	2014 Nanjing	Group All-around

Victoria Valeryevna Ilina (Russian: Виктория Валерьевна Ильина; born March 28, 1999, in Saransk, Russia) is a Russian Group rhythmic gymnast. She is the 2014 Youth Olympic Group all-around champion and the 2013 European Junior Group all-around champion.

== Junior ==
Ilina started out competing as an individual gymnast. Her first major international tournament was competing in the junior division at the 2012 Moscow Grand Prix. In 2013, Ilina began competing as a Group gymnast, she was member of the Russian Group at the 2013 European Junior Championships with Russia taking the gold medal scoring a total of (33.916) ahead of Belarus (32.700) and Bulgaria (32.532) in the all-around competition. They won another gold medal in 5 hoops final.

In 2014, Ilina competed with the Russian Group at the 2014 Moscow Grand Prix taking gold in Group all-around, following their placement, the Russian Group earned a qualification to compete for the Youth Olympic Games. On August 26–27, Ilina was member of the Russian Group (with Daria Anenkova, Daria Dubova, Sofya Skomorokh, Natalia Safonova) that competed at the 2014 Youth Olympic Games in Nanjing, China where they won gold in Group All-around finals.

In 2015, she suffered from injury and underwent a surgery. Therefore, she finished her career.
