= 2026 European Aesthetic Group Gymnastics Championships =

International gymnastics competition

- Venue: SamElyon sport and event centre
- Location: Samokov, Bulgaria
- Start date: 15 October 2025
- End date: 18 October 2025

The 2026 European Aesthetic Group Gymnastics Championships, the 7th edition, will be held in Samokov, Bulgaria, from October 15 to 18, 2026 at the SamElyon sport and event centre.

17 countries participated in the event, which is so far the most since the first edition. Alongside the event, from Thursday to Friday, will be held two international competitions - Academic Cup (for children categories and mixed teams) and Samelyon Cup (for short program).

== Participating nations ==
- Austria
- Belgium
- Bulgaria
- Czech Republic
- Cyprus
- Denmark
- Estonia
- Finland
- France
- Greece
- Hungary
- Italy
- Luxembourg
- Moldova
- Serbia
- Ukraine
- Russia

== Schedule ==
October 17 Saturday

- 13:30 Opening Ceremony
- 14:00-16:00 Junior & Senior Preliminaries - Group 1
- 16:45-18:45 Junior & Senior Preliminaries - Group 2

October 18 Sunday

- 12:00-14:00 Junior & Senior Finals
- 14:45 Award ceremony

== Medal winners ==
Event	Gold	Silver	Bronze
Senior Final	Expressia Russia; Polina Evteeva; Arina Ivanova; Polina Kostiuchenko; Daria Loktionova; Anna Nasibian; Kamilla Rasschupkina; Angelina Sheichuk; Amina Shigapova	Madonna Russia; Ruslana Brusanova; Ekaterina Davydova; Anastasiia Iakimovich; Victoria Ilchenko; Vitalina Khorina; Anastasiia Kuznetsova; Anastasiia Leonova; Alisa Remez; Anastasia Zolina	National Team Bulgaria; Dalia Ivanova; Mihaela Antova; Siana Filipova; Linoy Georgieva; Andera Hristova; Daria Nacheva; Zhalin Naydenova; Andrea Sarafova
Junior Final	National Team Bulgaria; Evdokia Dimitrova; Beloslava Dincheva; Raya Ivanova; Victoria Nencheva; Vanessa Pandova; Mihaela Pashova; Raya Rangelova	Victoria Russia; Malika Abramova; Alisa Alshina; Elena Dugaeva; Varvara Galakhova; Elizaveta Chaplygina; Aleksandra Miasnikova; Ekaterina Paustovskaia	Madonna Junior Russia; Anastasiia Alekseeva; Elizaveta Bakulina; Eva Gerasimova; Anastasiia Lobova; Polina Petrova; Sofia Pletneva; Valeriia Sharaia; Sofia Skopina; Uliana Sverchkova; Viktoriia Tulbovich

== Results ==
=== Senior ===
The top 12 teams (2 per country) and the host country in Preliminaries qualify to the Finals.

Place	Nation	Name	Preliminaries	Final	Total
1	Russia	Expressia	28.900 (1)	28.800 (1)	57.700
2	Russia	Madonna	28.400 (2)	28.200 (3)	56.600
3	Bulgaria	The National Team	28.150 (3)	28.350 (2)	56.500
4	Finland	Minetit	27.650 (4)	27.550 (4)	55.200
5	Finland	Gloria	27.200 (5)	26.650 (6)	53.850
6	Estonia	Rebasesabad	26.900 (9)	26.750 (5)	53.650
7	Czech Republic	Prague AGG Team Thunder	25.400 (11)	24.600 (8)	50.000
8	Ukraine	Grand Victory	25.000 (12)	24.550 (9)	49.550
9	Bulgaria	Team Bulgaria	23.800 (15)	25.450 (7)	49.250
10	Czech Republic	Team SMILLES	24.050 (14)	24.200 (10)	48.250
11	Italy	Fortebraccio Elite	24.300 (13)	23.550 (11)	47.850
12	Ukraine	Aelita Team	22.700 (16)	22.700 (12)	45.400
13	Finland	OVO Team	27.200 (5)	–	27.200
14	Finland	Sirius	27.150 (7)	–	27.150
15	Russia	Amuazh	26.950 (8)	–	26.950
16	Russia	Nebesa	26.800 (10)	–	26.800
17	Austria	Prestige Grace	22.100 (17)	–	22.100
18	Estonia	Melissa	20.900 (18)	–	20.900
18	Serbia	Senior team	20.900 (18)	–	20.900
18	Italy	Ardor	20.900 (18)	–	20.900
21	France	MASSILIA	20.600 (21)	–	20.600
22	Ukraine	Avangard	20.200 (22)	–	20.200
23	Belgium	Hopes Stars	19.750 (23)	–	19.750
24	Austria	Tanzfabrik	19.700 (24)	–	19.700
25	Moldova	Gloria Senior	19.400 (25)	–	19.400
26	Hungary	Queens	18.850 (26)	–	18.850

== Medal table ==
* Host nation (Bulgaria)

Rank	Nation	Gold	Silver	Bronze	Total
1	Russia (RUS)	1	2	1	4
2	Bulgaria (BUL)*	1	0	1	2
Totals (2 entries)		2	2	2	6
