= 2010 Aesthetic Group Gymnastics World Cup series =

International gymnastics competition

The 2010 IFAGG World Cup series in Aesthetic Group Gymnastics is a series of competitions officially organized and promoted by the International Federation of Aesthetic Group Gymnastics.

== Formats ==
World and Challenge Cup
Date	Event	Location
March 26-28	World and Challenge Cup I	(Finland) Jyväskylä
April 23-25	World Cup II	(Czech Republic) Brno
May 14-16	World Cup III	(Spain) Sant Cugat
October 22-23	World Cup IV	(Germany) Paderborn

== Medal winners ==
=== World Cup ===
Competitions	Gold	Silver	Bronze
World Cup
Jyväskylä	(Finland) Ampeerit	(Russia) Nebesa	(Russia) Madonna
Brno	(Finland) Ampeerit	(Russia) Oscar	(Russia) Madonna
Sant Cugat	(Finland) Ampeerit	(Russia) Madonna	(Russia) Oscar
Paderborn	(Russia) Madonna	(Finland) Ampeerit	(Bulgaria) Akademik

== Overall medal table ==
Rank	Nation	Gold	Silver	Bronze	Total
1	Finland (FIN)	3	1	0	4
2	Russia (RUS)	1	3	3	7
3	Bulgaria (BUL)	0	0	1	1
Totals (3 entries)		4	4	4	12

== See also ==
- 2010 World Aesthetic Group Gymnastics Championships
