= Lia Kallio =

Finnish rhythmic gymnast

- Born: 17 July 2007 (age 19) Helsinki, Finland

Gymnastics career
- Discipline: Rhythmic gymnastics
- Country represented: Finland (2022-present)
- Club: Olarin Voimistelijat
- Head coach: Iryna Klymenko
- Assistant coach: Larisa Gryadunova
- Former coaches: Marianna Tarhala, Svetlana Evchina

Lia Kallio (born 17 July 2007) is a Finnish rhythmic gymnast who represents Finland internationally. She is a two-time (2025, 2026) Finnish national all-around champion.

== Career ==
Kallio took up rhythmic gymnastics in 2011. She represented the gymnastics club Elise until 2017, when she started training in Olarin Voimistelijat with Larisa Gryadunova. In 2019 she won silver with ribbon and bronze in ball and team competition at the Marina Lobach Cup in Belarus.

=== Junior ===
In 2020, she started the season at Miss Valentine tournament in Tartu, winning bronze in rope and clubs finals. She was 4th in all-around. The same year, she won gold with rope and clubs at Finnish Championships in junior category. She took 6th place in all-around.

In 2022, she won bronze medal with clubs at Miss Valentine tournament. In March she competed at the International tournament Sofia Cup ending 8th in all-around, and taking bronze medal in ball final. In May she won gold in the all-around, hoop, ball and ribbon and silver in clubs final at the Nordic Championships in Uppsala. Later, she became Finnish junior all-around champion. She also won gold in clubs and silver in hoop, ball and ribbon finals. At the Portimão International Tournament she was 7th in ball and 8th in clubs final.

=== Senior ===
She became a senior in 2023, winning silver medal in ribbon final at Miss Valentine. In May, she won silver in all-around behind Emmi Piiroinen at Finnish National Championships, and also won silver with clubs and bronze with ball and ribbon. Kallio was then selected to compete at the World Championships in Valencia, Spain, as a part of senior group. She and her teammates took 17th place in group all-around.

In early March 2024, she won silver in ribbon final at Miss Valentine in Tartu. A week later she won bronze in all-around, silver with clubs and gold with ribbon at the Nordic Championships. She made her World Cup debut in Palaio Faliro, ending on 37th place in all-around. At the World Cup in Tashkent she was 17th in all-around. At nationals she won silver in the all-around and the finals with clubs and ribbon, taking gold with ball and bronze with hoop. In June, she competed at Milan World Cup, finishing on 26th place in all-around.

In 2025, she competed at Sofia World Cup and took 22nd place in all-around. In the end of April, she took part in Baku World Cup and placed 26th in all-around. In May, she won gold medal in all-around at National championships. She won another gold in ribbon, silver in ball and bronze in hoop and clubs finals. On May 09–11, she competed at Portimao World Challenge Cup, finishing 17th in all-around. She qualified to her first apparatus final with ribbon, ending on 6th place. In June, Lia represented Finland together with Emmi Piiroinen at the 2025 European Championships in Tallinn, Estonia. She qualified to all-around final, finishing on 23rd place. They took 10th place in team competition together with senior group. On 17-19 July she took 18th place in the all-around at the 2025 Summer Universiade in Essen. Week later, she competed at the Cluj-Napoca World Challenge Cup, where she took 21st place in the all-around. In August, she was selected to represent Finland alongside Emmi Piiroinen at the 2025 World Championships in Rio de Janeiro, Brazil. She took 39th place in all-around qualifications.

In 2026, Lia won bronze medal in team competition and gold in ball final at Miss Valentine tournament in February. In March, she won gold medal in all-around and gold in team at the Nordic Championships in Farum, Denmark. Then she competed at Marbella Grand Prix, where she finished on 19th place in all-around. In early April, she took 12th place in all-around at Thiais Grand Prix. In May, she became Finnish National all-around champion for the second consecutive year. She also won gold in hoop and clubs, silver in ball and bronze in ribbon final. She was selected to represent Finland at the 2026 European Championships in Varna, Bulgaria. She took 22nd place in all-around qualifications, narrowly missing out on the final. Together with Emmi Piiroinen and senior group she took 12th place in team competition.

== Routine music information ==
Year	Apparatus	Music title
2026	Hoop	The mad prince by Rok Nardin
2026	Ball	Dawn of Faith by Eternal Eclipse
2026	Clubs	Gonna Do My Thing by Louis II
2026	Ribbon	Prophetic Whispers by Brand X Music
2025	Hoop	Io ci sarò by Andrea Bocelli and Lang Lang
2025	Ball	Dawn of Faith by Eternal Eclipse
2025	Clubs	Womanizer by Britney Spears
2025	Ribbon	Another One Bites The Dust by Queen
2024	Hoop	Do Something Crazy by Outasight
2024	Ball	Nah Neh Nah by Vaya Con Dios
2024	Clubs	
2024	Ribbon	
