= 2017 World Aesthetic Group Gymnastics Championships =

International gymnastics competition

2017 World Aesthetic Gymnastics Championships
- Venue: Helsinki Ice Hall
- Location: Helsinki, Finland
- Start date: 26 May 2017
- End date: 28 May 2017

The 2017 World Aesthetic Gymnastics Championships, the 18th edition of the Aesthetic group gymnastics competition, was held in Helsinki, Finland from May 26 to 28, at the Helsinki Ice Hall.

== Participating nations ==
- Austria
- Belarus
- Bulgaria
- Canada
- Czech Republic
- Denmark
- Estonia
- Finland
- France
- Faroe Islands
- Hungary
- Italy
- Japan
- Russia
- Spain
- Turkey
- Ukraine

== Medal winners ==
| Event | Gold | Silver | Bronze |
|---|---|---|---|
| Senior Final | Minetit Finland Camilla Berg, Ronja Hakala, Emmi Nikkilä, Venla Niemenmaa, Siiri Puuska, Ella Ratilainen, Adeliina Sulkanen, Milja Vuorenmaa, Venla Lampo, Viivi-sofia Minkkinen, Jasmine Niemelä | Expressia Russia Anastasiya Chernyaeva, Anastasia Kozhemyakina, Elena Romanchenko, Olga Romanchenko, Daria Rudnichenko, Yana Sochugova, Arina Ten, Anastasia Yarkova, Arina Nikishova | OVO Team Finland Jenna Alavahtola, Laura Hirvonen, Irina Khanoukaeva, Janina Klang, Sanni Lehto, Iida Pasanen, Jasmin Rasinkangas, Mira Syrjälä, Anniina Taulos, Sanna Väkiparta |
| Junior Final | Minetit Elite Finland Ida Järvinen, Tuuli Kankaanpää, Janina Kaukomaa, Roosa Koski, Alina Panula, Riina Ruismäki, Viivi Saarenrinne, Enni Söderling | OVO Junior Team Finland Aino Handelberg, Tytti Ilvessalo, Angelica Kangas, Aurora Kapanen, Emma Koivunen, Iiris Koski, Alli Laaksonen, Tua-sofia Pihlajaniemi, Olivia Soini, Matilda Uosukainen | Victoria Russia Anastasiia Antoshina, Polina Furtseva, Anastasia Khakhulina, Zhanna Kurta, Arina Shishenina, Anastasia Skuzovatkina, Polina Salnikova, Iuliia Smagina |

== Results ==
=== Senior ===
The top 12 teams (2 per country) and the host country in Preliminaries qualify to the Finals.

| Place | Nation | Name | Preliminaries | Final | Total |
|---|---|---|---|---|---|
| 1st place, gold medalist(s) | Finland | Minetit | 19.450 (2) | 19.450 (1) | 38.900 |
| 2nd place, silver medalist(s) | Russia | Expressia | 19.500 (1) | 19.350 (2) | 38.850 |
| 3rd place, bronze medalist(s) | Finland | OVO Team | 19.150 (4) | 19.150 (3) | 38.300 |
| 4 | Russia | Madonna | 19.200 (3) | 18.600 (4) | 37.800 |
| 5 | Japan | Team Japan | 18.650 (5) | 18.550 (5) | 37.200 |
| 6 | Estonia | GC Janika Diamonds | 17.200 (10) | 17.850 (6) | 35.050 |
| 7 | Estonia | GC Rytmica Perfetto | 17.200 (11) | 17.350 (7) | 34.550 |
| 8 | Italy | Ardor | 17.100 (12) | 17.150 (8) | 34.250 |
| 9 | Ukraine | Alcor Avangard | 16.250 (15) | 16.350 (10) | 32.600 |
| 10 | Japan | JWCPE AGG Team | 16.200 (16) | 16.400 (9) | 32.600 |
| 11 | Spain | Cuitat de Barcelona - Alcon | 16.350 (14) | 15.750 (11) | 32.100 |
| 12 | Bulgaria | Etar Elit | 15.700 (18) | 15.500 (12) | 31.200 |
| 13 | Russia | Nebesa | 17.950 (6) | | 17.950 |
| 14 | Finland | Sirius | 17.500 (7) | | 17.500 |
| 15 | Russia | Vdokhnovenie | 17.500 (7) | | 17.500 |
| 16 | Finland | Team Vantaa | 17.300 (9) | | 17.300 |
| 17 | Estonia | GC Janika Tallinn Senior Team | 16.800 (13) | | 16.800 |
| 18 | Japan | Team Shoin | 15.750 (17) | | 15.750 |
| 19 | Czech Republic | SK MG Mantila Brno Joy | 15.650 (19) | | 15.650 |
| 20 | Faroe Islands | National Team | 15.300 (20) | | 15.300 |
| 21 | Czech Republic | GK Velký Týnec | 14.900 (21) | | 14.900 |
| 22 | Austria | Tanzfabrik | 14.900 (21) | | 14.900 |
| 23 | Italy | Team Minerva Nervianese | 14.900 (21) | | 14.900 |
| 24 | Denmark | Team Zelda | 14.650 (24) | | 14.650 |
| 25 | Denmark | Team Amelit | 14.400 (25) | | 14.400 |
| 26 | Faroe Islands | Team Svalan | 14.100 (26) | | 14.100 |
| 27 | Hungary | Grácia | 14.000 (27) | | 14.000 |
| 28 | Denmark | Team Nova | 13.000 (28) | | 13.000 |
| 29 | Czech Republic | SK Trasko Vyškov | 11.750 (29) | | 11.750 |
| 30 | France | Snow Les Etoiles de Louvres | 9.050 (30) | | 9.050 |
