= 2022 Aesthetic Group Gymnastics World Cup series =

Gymnastics competition series

The 2022 IFAGG World Cup series in Aesthetic Group Gymnastics is a series of competitions officially organized and promoted by the International Federation of Aesthetic Group Gymnastics.

== Formats ==
World and Challenge Cup
Date	Event	Location
March 12-13	World and Challenge Cup I	(Estonia) Tallinn
May 06-07	World and Challenge Cup II	(Bulgaria) Sofia
June 09-10	World and Challenge Cup III	(Finland) Tampere
October 29-30	World and Challenge Cup IV	(Malaysia) Kuala Lumpur

== Medal winners ==
=== World Cup ===
Competitions	Gold	Silver	Bronze
World Cup
Tallinn	(Finland) OVO Team	(Finland) Minetit	(Estonia) Siidisabad
Sofia	(Bulgaria) National Team	(Finland) Minetit	(Estonia) Siidisabad
Tampere	(Finland) Minetit	(Finland) Gloria	(Estonia) Siidisabad
Kuala Lumpur	Expressia	Madonna	(Kazakhstan) Kerbez

=== Challenge Cup ===
Competitions	Gold	Silver	Bronze
Challenge Cup
Tallinn	(Finland) OVO Junior Team	(Finland) Sanix Valens Junior	(Estonia) Violett
Sofia	(Bulgaria) National Team	(Finland) Minetit Junior	None Awarded
Sofia	(Bulgaria) National Team	(Finland) OVO Junior Team	None Awarded
Tampere	(Finland) Minetit Junior	(Finland) OVO Junior Team	(Estonia) Rytmika Junior Team
Kuala Lumpur	Victoria	Victoria Strela	(Kazakhstan) Sunrise

== Overall medal table ==
Rank	Nation	Gold	Silver	Bronze	Total
1	Finland (FIN)	4	7	0	11
2	RGF	2	2	0	4
3	Bulgaria (BUL)	2	0	0	2
4	Estonia (EST)	0	0	5	5
5	Kazakhstan (KAZ)	0	0	2	2
Totals (5 entries)		8	9	7	24

== See also ==
- 2022 World Aesthetic Gymnastics Championships
