= European Aesthetic Group Gymnastics Championships =

The Aesthetic Group Gymnastics European Championships are the european championships for the sport of aesthetic group gymnastics. Aesthetic Group Gymnastics is a discipline not currently recognized by the Fédération Internationale de Gymnastique. European Championships are organized annually since 2016 by the International Federation of Aesthetic Group Gymnastics (IFAGG). Initially, the competition was organized every year, but then in 2018 they decided to organize it every two years. In 2020, the event was postponed to 2021 due to a COVID-19 pandemic.

== Editions ==
| Year | Edition | Host city | Country | Events (female) |
|---|---|---|---|---|
| 2016 | 1 | Tartu | Estonia | 1 |
| 2017 | 2 | Sofia | Bulgaria | 1 |
| 2018 | 3 | Tallinn | Estonia | 1 |
| 2021 | 4 | Moscow | Russia | 1 |
| 2023 | 5 | Vantaa | Finland | 1 |
| 2025 | 6 | Budapest | Hungary | 1 |
| 2026 | 7 | Samokov | Bulgaria | 1 |
| 2027 | 8 | Samokov | Bulgaria | 1 |
| 2028 | 9 | Tallinn | Estonia | 1 |

== Medalists ==
=== Senior ===
| Year | Edition | Location | Gold | Silver | Bronze |
| 2016 | I | (Estonia) Tartu | Finland; Minetit | Russia; Expressia | Russia; Madonna |
| 2017 | II | (Bulgaria) Sofia | Russia; Expressia | Finland; Minetit Russia; Madonna | —N/a |
| 2018 | III | (Estonia) Tallinn | Russia; Madonna | Finland; Minetit | Russia; Expressia |
| 2021 | IV | (Russia) Moscow | Russia; Madonna | Finland; Minetit | Russia; Amuazh |
| 2023 | V | (Finland) Vantaa | Finland; Minetit | Bulgaria; The National team | Finland; Gloria |
| 2025 | VI | (Hungary) Budapest | Bulgaria; The National team | RGF; Expressia | RGF; Madonna |
| 2026 | VII | (Bulgaria) Samokov | Russia; Expressia | Russia; Madonna | Bulgaria; National team |

=== Junior ===
| Year | Edition | Location | Gold | Silver | Bronze |
| 2016 | I | (Estonia) Tartu | Russia; Victoria | Finland; Minetit Junior | Estonia; Diamonds |
| 2017 | II | (Bulgaria) Sofia | Finland; OVO Junior Team | Russia; Victoria | Finland; Minetit Elite |
| 2018 | III | (Estonia) Tallinn | Russia; Victoria | Finland; Minetit Junior | Finland; OVO Junior Team |
| 2021 | IV | (Russia) Moscow | Russia; Victoria | Estonia; Siidisabad | Finland; Minetit Junior |
| 2023 | V | (Finland) Vantaa | Finland; Minetit Junior | Finland; OVO Junior Team | Estonia; Rytmika Junior Team |
| 2025 | VI | (Hungary) Budapest | RGF; Madonna Junior | Bulgaria; National team | RGF; Victoria |
| 2026 | VII | (Bulgaria) Samokov | Bulgaria; National team | Russia; Victoria | Russia; Madonna Junior |

== All-time medal table ==
2000-2026

- Last updated after the 2026 European Aesthetic Group Gymnastics Championships

| Rank | Nation | Gold | Silver | Bronze | Total |
|---|---|---|---|---|---|
| 1 | Russia (RUS) | 7 | 5 | 4 | 16 |
| 2 | Finland (FIN) | 4 | 6 | 4 | 14 |
| 3 | Bulgaria (BUL) | 2 | 2 | 1 | 5 |
| 4 | RGF | 1 | 1 | 2 | 4 |
| 5 | Estonia (EST) | 0 | 1 | 2 | 3 |
| Totals (5 entries) | | 14 | 15 | 13 | 42 |
