= 2018 European Aesthetic Gymnastics Championships =

2018 gymnastics competition

- Venue: Kalev Sports Hall
- Location: Tallinn, Estonia
- Start date: 11 May 2018
- End date: 13 May 2018

The 2018 European Aesthetic Group Gymnastics Championships, the 3rd edition, was held in Tallinn, Estonia, from May 11 to 13, 2018 at the Kalev Sports Hall.

== Participating nations ==
- Austria
- Belarus
- Bulgaria
- Denmark
- Estonia
- Faroe Islands
- Finland
- Hungary
- Italy
- Russia
- Ukraine

== Schedule ==
May 12 Saturday

- 12:00 Opening Ceremony
- 12:15 Junior Preliminaries
- 18:00 Senior Preliminaries

May 13 Sunday

- 12:00 Junior Finals
- 13:30 Senior Finals
- 15:00 Awarding and Closing Ceremony

== Medal winners ==
Event	Gold	Silver	Bronze
Senior Final	Madonna Russia Daria Zhdanova, Daria Kuklina, Polina Sosnina, Alina Bolbat, Lyubov Palchikova, Anastasiia Ponikarova, Alexandra Kuznetsova, Valeriya Uryupina, Sofiia Ostrovskaia	Minetit Finland Camilla Berg, Jessica Hakala, Venla Niemenmaa, Emmi Nikkilä, Siiri Puuska, Eveliina Rajajärvi, Ella Ratilainen, Riina Ruismäki, Pihla Silvennoinen, Milja Vuorenmaa	Expressia Russia Daria Dubova, Varvara Kasimova, Anastasia Kozhemyakina, Arina Nikishova, Daria Rudnichenko, Evgeniya Shokarova, Vanessa Sim, Kamilia Suleimanova

Event	Gold	Silver	Bronze
Junior Final	Victoria Russia Furtseva Polina, Skuzovatkina Anastasia, Antoshina Anastasia, Salnikova Polina, Zrazhevskaia Anastasiia, Lazeikina Nadezhda, Smagina Iuliia	Minetit Junior Finland Aaltonen Senja, Bäckman Enni, Kankaanpää Tuuli, Koski Roosa, Mäkinen Kaisa, Saarenrinne Viivi, Steklova Kristiina, Söderling Enni	OVO Junior Team Finland Handelberg Aino, Ilvessalo Tytti, Kapanen Erliette, Kohvakko Ulrika, Koski Iiris, Lentonen Emilia, Pihlajaniemi Tua-sofia, Rinkinen Emilia, Soini Olivia, Temin Ariana, Uosukainen Matilda, Kangas Angelica

== Results ==
=== Senior ===
The top 12 teams (2 per country) and the host country in Preliminaries qualify to the Finals.

Place	Nation	Name	Preliminaries	Final	Total
1st place, gold medalist(s)	Russia	Madonna	19.600 (1)	19.450 (1)	39.050
2nd place, silver medalist(s)	Finland	Minetit	19.100 (3)	19.050 (2)	38.150
3rd place, bronze medalist(s)	Russia	Expressia	19.150 (2)	18.700 (3)	37.850
4	Finland	OVO Team	18.350 (4)	18.550 (4)	36.900
5	Estonia	Team Wonder	17.550 (5)	17.600 (5)	35.150
6	Bulgaria	National team	17.350 (7)	17.200 (6)	34.550
7	Ukraine	Alcor Avangard	16.100 (10)	16.450 (7)	32.550
8	Estonia	Senior Team	16.200 (9)	16.200 (9)	32.400
9	Italy	Ardor	15.650 (11)	15.400 (9)	31.050
10	Ukraine	Vivend	14.950 (12)	14.950 (10)	29.900
11	Faroe Islands	Team Hydra	14.550 (13)	14.300 (11)	28.850
12	Denmark	Elina Elite	14.200 (15)	14.150 (12)	28.350
13	Finland	Gloria	17.450 (6)		17.450
14	Finland	Sanix Valens	16.450 (8)		16.450
15	Ukraine	Delice	14.550 (13)		14.550
16	Hungary	Lavender	13.800 (16)		13.800

== Medal table ==
Rank	Nation	Gold	Silver	Bronze	Total
1	Russia (RUS)	2	0	1	3
2	Finland (FIN)	0	2	1	3
Totals (2 entries)		2	2	2	6
