= 2017 European Aesthetic Gymnastics Championships =

International gymnastics competition

- Venue: Arena Armeec
- Location: Sofia, Bulgaria
- Start date: 20 October 2017
- End date: 22 October 2017

The 2017 European Aesthetic Group Gymnastics Championships, the 2nd edition, was held in Sofia, Bulgaria, from October 21 to 22, 2017 at the Arena Armeec.

== Schedule ==
October 21 Saturday

- 16:00 - 16:30 Opening Ceremony
- 16:30 - 20:00 Junior and Senior Preliminaries

October 22 Sunday

- 10:35 - 12:35 Junior and Senior Finals
- 12:40 - 13:30 Awarding and Closing Ceremony

== Medal winners ==
Event	Gold	Silver	Bronze
Senior Final	Expressia Russia Anastasiya Chernyaeva, Anastasia Kozhemyakina, Elena Romanchenko, Olga Romanchenko, Daria Rudnichenko, Yana Sochugova, Arina Ten, Anastasia Yarkova, Arina Nikishova	Minetit Finland Camilla Berg, Ronja Hakala, Venla Niemenmaa, Emmi Nikkilä, Jessica Hakala, Siiri Puuska, Eveliina Rajajärvi, Ella Ratilainen, Riina Ruismäki, Pihla Silvennoinen, Milja Vuorenmaa Madonna Russia Daria Zhdanova, Daria Kuklina, Marina Onishchenko, Polina Sosina, Alina Bolbat, Lyubov Palchikoa, Anastasiia Ponikarova, Alexandra Kuznetsova, Valeriya Uryupian	—N/a

Event	Gold	Silver	Bronze
Junior Final	OVO Junior Team Finland Aino Handelberg, Aurora Kapanen, Emma Koivunen, Alli Laaksonen, Tytti Ilvessalo, Angelica Kangas, Iiris Koski, Tua-sofia Pihlajaniemi, Olivia Soini, Matilda Uosukainen	Victoria Russia Anastasiia Antoshina, Polina Furtseva, Anastasia Khakhulina, Zhanna Kurta, Arina Shishenina, Anastasia Skuzovatkina, Polina Salnikova, Iuliia Smagina	Minetit Elite Finland Ida Järvinen, Tuuli Kankaanpää, Janina Kaukomaa, Roosa Koski, Viivi Saarenrinne, Enni Söderling, Senja Aaltonen, Kaisa Mäkinen

== Medal table ==
Rank	Nation	Gold	Silver	Bronze	Total
1	Russia (RUS)	1	2	0	3
2	Finland (FIN)	1	1	1	3
Totals (2 entries)		2	3	1	6
