= 2021 European Aesthetic Group Gymnastics Championships =

International gymnastics competition

- Venue: Irina Viner-Usmanova Gymnastics Palace
- Location: Moscow, Russia
- Start date: 14 May 2021
- End date: 16 May 2021

The 2021 European Aesthetic Group Gymnastics Championships, the 4th edition, was held in Moscow, Russia, from May 14 to 16, 2021 at the Irina Viner-Usmanova Gymnastics Palace. Due to the global pandemic, many countries canceled their participation, so there was less competition.

== Participating nations ==
- Belarus
- Czech Republic
- Denmark
- Estonia
- Finland
- Luxembourg
- Moldova
- Russia
- Spain

== Schedule ==
May 12 Saturday

- 15:00 Opening Ceremony
- 15:30 Junior Preliminaries
- 17:30 Senior Preliminaries

May 13 Sunday

- 12:00 Junior Finals
- 13:30 Senior Finals
- 15:30 Awarding and Closing Ceremony

== Medal winners ==
Event	Gold	Silver	Bronze
Senior Final	Madonna Russia Sofiia Ostrovskaia, Sofya Shabalina, Alisa Charushina, Milena Rastvorova, Marina Chekarkova, Yulia Kalinichenko, Alisa Remez, Aina Farakshina, Elizaveta Nikolicheva, Marina Onishchenko	Minetit Finland Camilla Berg, Jessica Hakala, Ulrika Kohvakko, Emmi Nikkilä, Ella Ratilainen, Meeriellen Sukari, Olivia Yli-Juuti	Amuazh Russia Polina Bulgacheva, Anastasiia Deriabina, Ekaterina Kholodova, Ekaterina Smirnova, Polina Shunina, Yana Zakharova, Ekaterina Shugol, Natalia Neglinskaya, Irina Bezborodko

Event	Gold	Silver	Bronze
Junior Final	Victoria Russia Anna Paniushkina, Ekaterina Andreeva, Arina Monogenova, Alena Bandorina, Ariadna Kovalevskaya, Kristina Zilber, Aleksandra Sukaylo, Mariia Emelianova, Iuliia Chesnokova, Polina Novitskaia	Siidisabad Estonia Karoli Metsma, Michelle Sild Terit, Elis Sarapuu, Liina Sarv, Riin Parts, Kärt Rentel, Karolina Kuusik, Triin-Elis Kuum, Hanna Mägi, Maria Terep	Minetit Junior Finland Tilda Holappa, Iinu Häkkinen, Katariina Järventausta, Linnea Louvanto, Adaliina Niininen, Serafiina Niininen, Lilja Peurakoski, Anastasia Rogozhina

== Results ==
=== Senior ===
The top 12 teams (2 per country) and the host country in Preliminaries qualify to the Finals.

Place	Nation	Name	Preliminaries	Final	Total
1st place, gold medalist(s)	Russia	Madonna	18.983 (1)	19.167 (1)	38.150
2nd place, silver medalist(s)	Finland	Minetit	18.650 (2)	18.900 (2)	37.550
3rd place, bronze medalist(s)	Russia	Amuazh	18.600 (3)	18.600 (3)	37.200
4	Finland	OVO Team	18.100 (6)	18.600 (3)	36.700
5	Estonia	Grisete	17.467 (8	17.583 (5)	35.050
6	Spain	Ciudad de Barcelona Alcon	16.517 (9)	16.567 (7)	33.084
7	Estonia	Caresse	15.983 (10)	16.650 (6)	32.633
8	Spain	Ritmica Cartagena	15.417 (12)	15.717 (8)	31.134
9	Czech Republic	SK MG Mantila Brno Zonja	15.483 (11)	15.467 (9)	30.950
10	Denmark	Team Greve	14.550 (13)	14.433 (10)	28.983
11	Moldova	National Team Gloria	9.850 (14)	10.167 (11)	20.017
12	Russia	Victoria Start	18.350 (4)		18.350
13	Russia	Vdokhnovenie	18.250 (5)		18.250
14	Finland	Gloria	17.567 (7)		17.567

=== Junior ===
The top 12 teams (2 per country) and the host country in Preliminaries qualify to the Finals.

Place	Nation	Name	Preliminaries	Final	Total
1st place, gold medalist(s)	Russia	Victoria	18.800 (1)	19.217 (1)	38.017
2nd place, silver medalist(s)	Estonia	Siidisabad	18.283 (2)	18.617 (2)	36.900
3rd place, bronze medalist(s)	Finland	Minetit Junior	18.233 (3)	18.200 (3)	36.433
4	Russia	Madonna Junior	17.950 (4)	18.133 (5)	36.083
5	Finland	OVO Junior Team	17.767 (5)	18.200 (3)	35.967
6	Estonia	Violett	16.500 (9)	16.733 (6)	33.233
7	Belarus	Silifa-Rostochki	15.717 (11)	16.433 (7)	32.150
8	Czech Republic	SK MG Mantila Brno Fenix	14.333 (13)	14.850 (8)	29.183
9	Belarus	Silfida-Fleur	14.550 (12)	14.433 (9)	28.983
10	Luxembourg	Aurore Oetrange	10.733 (14)	10.167 (10)	20.900
11	Russia	Oscar	17.767 (5)		17.767
12	Russia	Roxett	17.450 (7)		17.450
13	Finland	Elite Junior	17.350 (8)		17.350
14	Estonia	GC Piruett Junior Team	15.983 (10)		15.983

== Medal table ==
Rank	Nation	Gold	Silver	Bronze	Total
1	Russia (RUS)	2	0	1	3
2	Finland (FIN)	0	1	1	2
3	Estonia (EST)	0	1	0	1
Totals (3 entries)		2	2	2	6
