= 2025 Aesthetic Group Gymnastics World Cup series =

Gymnastics competition series

The 2025 IFAGG World Cup series in Aesthetic Group Gymnastics is a series of competitions officially organized and promoted by the International Federation of Aesthetic Group Gymnastics.

== Formats ==
World and Challenge Cup
Date	Event	Location
March 1–2	World and Challenge Cup I	(Estonia) Tartu
April 26–27	World and Challenge Cup II	(Canada) Toronto
June 28–29	World and Challenge Cup III	(Greece) Larissa
October 22–26	World and Challenge Cup Finals	(Malaysia) Kuala Lumpur

== Medal winners ==
=== World Cup ===
Competitions	Gold	Silver	Bronze
World Cup
Tartu	(Finland) OVO Team	(Estonia) Rebasesabad	(Estonia) Diente
Toronto	(Finland) Minetit	(Finland) Gloria	(Estonia) Rebasesabad
Larissa	(Bulgaria) The National team	(Finland) Minetit	(Finland) Gloria
Kuala Lumpur	(Russia) Expressia	(Russia) Vdokhnovenie	(Japan) JWCPE AGG Team

=== Challenge Cup ===
Competitions	Gold	Silver	Bronze
Challenge Cup
Tartu	(Finland) Minetit Junior	(Finland) OVO Junior Team	(Estonia) Rebasesabad Junior
Toronto	(Finland) Minetit Junior	(Finland) OVO Junior Team	(Estonia) Rebasesabad Junior
Larissa	(Bulgaria) National team	(Finland) Minetit Junior	(Finland) OVO Junior Team
Kuala Lumpur	(Russia) Madonna Junior	(Russia) Victoria	(Kazakhstan) ALEM

== Overall medal table ==
Rank	Nation	Gold	Silver	Bronze	Total
1	Finland (FIN)	4	5	2	11
2	Russia (RUS)	2	2	0	4
3	Bulgaria (BUL)	2	0	0	2
4	Estonia (EST)	0	1	4	5
5	Japan (JPN)	0	0	1	1
5	Kazakhstan (KAZ)	0	0	1	1
Totals (6 entries)		8	8	8	24

== See also ==
- 2025 World Aesthetic Group Gymnastics Championships
