= 2023 European Aesthetic Group Gymnastics Championships =

International gymnastics competition

- Venue: Energia Areena
- Location: Vantaa, Finland
- Start date: 26 May 2023
- End date: 28 May 2023

The 2023 European Aesthetic Group Gymnastics Championships, the 5th edition, was held in Vantaa, Finland, from May 26 to 28, 2023 at the Energia Areena.

Following the advice of IOC President Thomas Bach on the issue of the safety of athletes from Russia and Belarus, the IFAGG Council decided to prevent their teams from participating in the 2022 World Championships and the 2023 European Championships. The IFAGG president described the decision as "fatal because for the athletes life is sports, and the competitions are the basis of sports", but emphasized that it was necessary in order to safeguard cooperation with other sports organizations and to maintain the pathway towards Olympic recognition.

== Participating nations ==
- Austria
- Bulgaria
- Czech Republic
- Denmark
- Estonia
- Finland
- Italy
- Luxembourg
- Spain
- Ukraine

== Schedule ==
May 27 Saturday

- 12:00 Opening Ceremony
- 12:15 Junior Preliminaries
- 14:35 Senior Preliminaries

May 28 Sunday

- 12:00 Junior Finals
- 13:45 Senior Finals
- 15:30 Awarding and Closing Ceremony

== Medal winners ==
Event	Gold	Silver	Bronze
Senior Final	Minetit Finland Sanni Hartman, Tilda Holappa, Jenni Hyytiäinen, Iinu Häkkinen, Katariina Järventausta, Adaliina Niininen, Lara Pietilä, Sini Tapio	The National team Bulgaria Victoria Berova, Sibila Karpacheva, Hristiana Kovacheva, Karina Neykova, Daria Kapsazova, Yana Staykova, Maria Mehlemova, Siyana Tabakova	Gloria Finland Henni Hölttä, Milla Jääskeläinen, Elma Kaasalainen, Josefina Ketola, Eirini Nora Kuusisto, Sara Linna, Noora Luoto, Anna Erika Luoto, Hertta Martikainen, Tiara Reyes, Justiina Tiittanen, Varvara Yulle

Event	Gold	Silver	Bronze
Junior Final	Minetit Junior Finland Ella Koskinen, Minttu Malinen, Minttu Mikkola, Serafiina Niininen, Lilja Peurakoski, Emma Kauppinen, Elle Sovelius, Saimi Sepponen	OVO Junior Team Finland Kerttu Hakkarainen, Ella Heiskanen, Aino Hyppönen, Mimosa Järvelä, Noona Kellas, Selma Länsmans, Melina Marila, Sanni Salminen, Laura Seppä, Yagmur Serengil, Alida Virkkunen	Rytmika Junior Team Estonia Annabel Juuriste, Marii Elis Jürisoo, Hele-Riin Kallari, Emma Kivikas, Mona Maasikas, Pauline Mikker, Rebeka Raid, Saskia Treufeldt, Kirke Veski

== Results ==
=== Senior ===
The top 12 teams (2 per country) and the host country in Preliminaries qualify to the Finals.

Place	Nation	Name	Preliminaries	Final	Total
1st place, gold medalist(s)	Finland	Minetit	27.700 (2)	28.000 (1)	55.700
2nd place, silver medalist(s)	Bulgaria	The National team	28.000 (1)	27.600 (2)	55.600
3rd place, bronze medalist(s)	Finland	Gloria	27.000 (3)	26.700 (3)	53.700
4	Estonia	Siidisabad	26.500 (5)	26.300 (4)	52.800
5	Bulgaria	National team	26.650 (4)	25.950 (5)	52.600
6	Estonia	Caresse	24.450 (8)	24.050 (6)	48.500
7	Czech Republic	Team Zonja	23.500 (10)	23.150 (7)	46.650
8	Czech Republic	Team Fenix	22.600 (11)	22.850 (8)	45.450
9	Ukraine	Grand Victory	22.550 (12)	22.450 (9)	45.000
10	Denmark	Team Greve	21.750 (13)	21.200 (10)	42.950
11	Ukraine	Avangard	21.400 (14)	21.150 (11)	42.550
12	Austria	Tanzfabrik	21.000 (15)	18.800 (12)	39.800
13	Finland	OVO Team	26.250 (6)		26.250
14	Finland	Sirius	25.850 (7)		25.850
15	Estonia	Violett	23.900 (9)		23.900
16	Czech Republic	Infinity	20.950 (16)		20.950
17	Italy	Pro Recco Gym Club	20.150 (17)		20.150
18	Denmark	DHG elite	20.050 (18)		23.900
19	Denmark	Aura	18.900 (19)		18.900

== Medal table ==
Rank	Nation	Gold	Silver	Bronze	Total
1	Finland (FIN)	2	1	1	4
2	Bulgaria (BUL)	0	1	0	1
3	Estonia (EST)	0	0	1	1
Totals (3 entries)		2	2	2	6
