= Emmi Piiroinen =

Finnish rhythmic gymnast

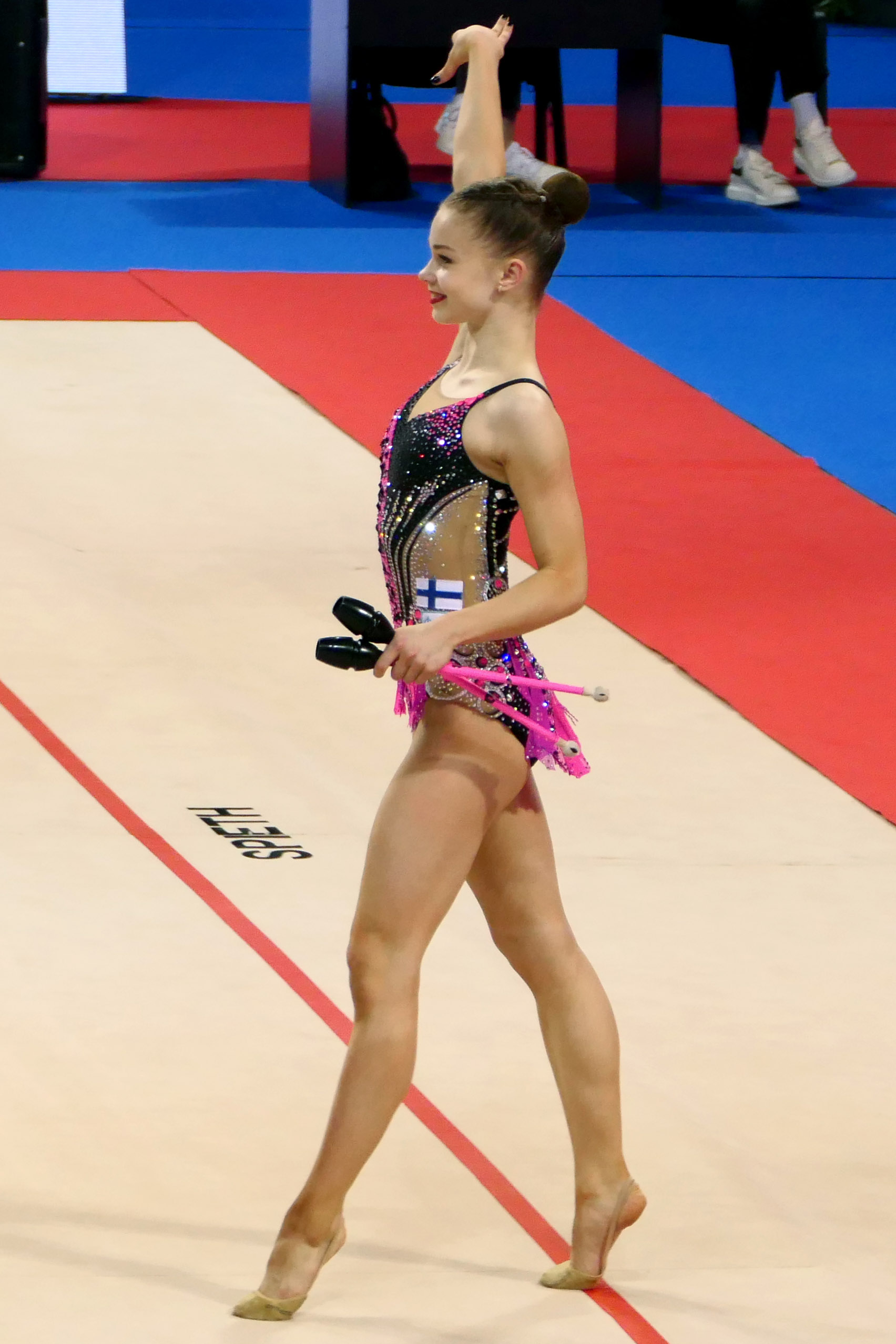

Personal information
- Born: 8 August 2007 (age 19) Espoo, Finland

Gymnastics career
- Discipline: Rhythmic gymnastics
- Country represented: Finland (2020-present)
- Club: Olarin Voimistelijat
- Head coach: Iryna Klymenko
- Assistant coach: Larisa Gryadunova

Emmi Piiroinen (born 8 August 2007) is a Finnish rhythmic gymnast who represents Finland internationally. She is a two-time (2023, 2024) Finnish National all-around champion and a two-time (2025, 2026) all-around silver medalist.

== Career ==
Piiroinen took up rhythmic gymnastics at age three. In 2019 she won silver with rope and clubs at the Marina Lobach Cup in Belarus. The following year she won gold in the All-Around and with ribbon as well as bronze with rope and clubs at the Finnish Championships. In 2021 she retained her national title and also son all the gold medals in the four event finals.

In 2022, she competed at the International Sofia Cup ending 11th overall, 5th with hoop and 7th with ribbon. In May she won bronze in the All-Around and silver at the Nordic Championships in Uppsala. At nationals she took 3rd place in the All-Around, getting bronze also with ribbon as well as silver with clubs and gold with hoop and with ball. At the Portimão International Tournament she was 7th in the junior ribbon final. In June she was selected for the European Championships in Tel Aviv, finishing 5th with hoop and ball, 6th with clubs and 8th in teams.

=== Senior ===
She became a senior in 2023, becoming national champion with ball and with clubs. In April she took part in the World Cup in Tashkent, being 18th in the All-Around, 16th with hoop, 28th with ball, 22nd with clubs and 21st with ribbon. At the European Championships in Baku she was 22nd in the All-Around, 16th with hoop, 24th with ball, 26th with clubs and 27th with ribbon. In Cluj-Napoca she finished 30th overall, 14th with hoop, 30th with ball, 24th with clubs and 47th with ribbon. Piiroinen was then selected for her maiden World Championships in Valencia, taking 30th place in the All-Around, 24th with hoop, 28th with ball, 25th with clubs and 67th with ribbon.

In early March 2024, she was 10th in the All-Around, 8th with hoop and 4th with ball at Miss Valentine in Tartu. A week later she won gold at the Nordic Championships. At the Thiais Grand Prix she took 9th place overall and 6th in the clubs final. At the World Cup in Tashkent she was 15th overall. At nationals she won the All-Around and the finals with ball and ribbon, taking silver with hoop and bronze with clubs. In May she participated in the European Championships in Budapest, ending 14th in teams and 25th in the All-Around.

In 2025, she competed at Sofia World Cup and took 29th place in all-around. In the end of April, she took part in Baku World Cup and placed 20th in all-around. She nearly missed an apparatus final with ball (12th place). In May, she won silver medal in all-around behind Lia Kallio at National championships. She won gold in hoop and ball and silver in clubs and ribbon finals. Later, she competed at International tournament Gdynia Rhythmic Stars in Poland, taking 4th place in all-around and bronze medal in ball final. In June, Emmi represented Finland together with Lia Kallio at the 2025 European Championships in Tallinn, Estonia. She placed 26th in all-around qualifications and did not qualify to all-around final. They took 10th place in team competition together with senior group. In July, she competed at the Milan World Cup, where she took 19th place in the all-around. In August, she was selected to represent Finland alongside Lia Kallio at the 2025 World Championships in Rio de Janeiro, Brazil. She took 33rd place in all-around qualifications.

== Routine music information ==
Year	Apparatus	Music title
2026	Hoop	Feeling Good by Apashe, Cherry Lena
2026	Ball	Kill Of The Night by Gin Wigmore
2026	Clubs	Confident by Demi Lovato
2026	Ribbon	Esa Diva by Melody
2025	Hoop	
2025	Ball	Kill Of The Night by Gin Wigmore
2025	Clubs	4 Minutes (Scissors Remix) by Madonna feat. Justin Timberlake
2025	Ribbon	Show Me How You Burlesque by Christina Aguilera
2024	Hoop	Für Elise by Hidden Citizens
2024	Ball	Le temps des cathédrales (Live 2015) by Josh Groban
2024	Clubs	4 Minutes (Scissors Remix) by Madonna ft. Justin Timberlake and Timbaland
2024	Ribbon	Miserlou by Caroline Campbell & William Joseph (feat. Tina Guo)
2023	Hoop	New World Concerto by MAKSIM, Royal Philharmonic Orchestra & Julian Kershaw
2023	Ball	Guarda che luna by Kvatro
2023	Clubs	No Man No Cry (Jimmy Sax Version) by Jimmy Sax
2023	Ribbon	Flamenco (feat. Rage) [Extended Mix] by Timmy Trumpet & JETFIRE
2022	Hoop	
2022	Ball	
2022	Clubs	
2022	Ribbon	Flamenco (feat. Rage) [Extended Mix] by Timmy Trumpet & JETFIRE
