= 2016 European Aesthetic Gymnastics Championships =

International gymnastics competition

- Venue: A. Le Coq Sportshall
- Location: Tartu, Estonia
- Start date: 11 February 2016
- End date: 14 February 2016

The 2016 European Aesthetic Group Gymnastics Championships, the 1st edition, was held in Tartu, Estonia, from February 11 to 14, 2016 at the A. Le Coq Sportshall.

== Participating nations ==
- Czech Republic
- Denmark
- Estonia
- Finland
- Italy
- Russia
- Spain
- Ukraine

== Schedule ==
Feb 13 Saturday

- 13:00-13:30 Opening Ceremony
- 13:30-16:00 Junior and Senior Preliminaries
- 17:00-17:15 Draw for Finals

Feb 14 Sunday

- 13:00-15:00 Junior and Senior Finals
- 15:00-16:00 Awarding Ceremony

== Medal winners ==
Event	Gold	Silver	Bronze
Senior Final	Minetit Finland Camilla Berg, Janica Berg, Ronja Hakala, Venla Lampo, Liisa Lepola, Venla Niemenmaa, Emmi Nikkilä, Siiri Puuska, Ella Ratilainen, Elena Ticklen	Expressia Russia Alina Vorontsova, Anastasia Kozhemyakina, Kristina Panarina, Elena Romanchenko, Olga Romanchenko, Yana Sochugova, Arina Ten, Anastasiya Chernyaeva, Anastasia Yarkova	Madonna Russia Daria Zhdanova, Alexandra Kuznetsova, Daria Kuklina, Maria Maltseva, Daria Nagornova, Khristina Obolskaia, Marina Onishchenko, Lyubov Palchikova, Anastasiia Ponikarova, Polina Sosnina, Valeriya Uryupina

Event	Gold	Silver	Bronze
Junior Final	Victoria Russia Aleksandra Danilina, Anastasia Khakhulina, Valeriya Uryupina, Polina Baranova, Elizaveta Matikova, Polina Shunina, Daria Melnikova, Arina Shishenina, Irina Titenko	Minetit Jr. Finland Julia Järventö, Tuuli Kankaanpää, Emilia Minkkinen, Viivi-Sofia Minkkinen, Jasmine Niemelä, Viivi Saarenrinne, Pihla Silvennoinen, Enni Söderling, Vilhelmiina Viljanen, Milja Vuorenmaa	Diamonds Estonia Annela Seliste, Helena Seliste, Katrin Fessak, Caroly Päkk, Gled Airiin Tärn, Trinity Liisa Lotta Kannus, Marleen Viinapuu, Marian Roomet, Marleen Ereline, Anni Liis Hoop

== Medal table ==
Rank	Nation	Gold	Silver	Bronze	Total
1	Russia (RUS)	1	1	1	3
2	Finland (FIN)	1	1	0	2
3	Estonia (EST)	0	0	1	1
Totals (3 entries)		2	2	2	6
