= Natalia Safonova =

Russian rhythmic gymnast (born 1999)

- Full name: Natalia Viktorovna Safonova
- Nickname: Natasha
- Born: 17 July 1999 (age 27) St. Petersburg, Russia

Gymnastics career
- Discipline: Rhythmic gymnastics
- Country represented: Russia (2011-2016)
- Club: Gazprom
- Gym: Novogorsk
- Head coach: Irina Viner
- Assistant coach: Inna Bystrova
Medal record
Group Rhythmic Gymnastics
Representing Russia
Junior European Championships
Gold medal – first place	2013 Vienna	Group All-around
Gold medal – first place	2013 Vienna	5 Hoops
Youth Olympic Games
Gold medal – first place	2014 Nanjing	Group All-around

Natalia Viktorovna Safonova (Russian: Наталья Викторовна Сафонова, born 17 July 1999 in St.Petersburg, Russia) is a retired Russian Group rhythmic gymnast. She is the 2014 Youth Olympic Group all-around champion and the 2013 European Junior Group all-around champion.

== Career ==
In 2013, Safonova was member of the Russian Group at the 2013 European Junior Championships with Russia taking the gold medal scoring a total of (33.916) ahead of Belarus (32.700) and Bulgaria (32.532) in the all-around competition. They won another gold medal in 5 hoops final.

On 26–27 August 2014, Safonova was a member of the Russian Group (with Daria Anenkova, Daria Dubova, Sofya Skomorokh, Victoria Ilina) that competed at the 2014 Youth Olympic Games in Nanjing, China where they won gold in Group All-around finals.

Since 2021, she has been working as a head coach of the Turkish rhythmic gymnastics national team in group. The junior group became finalists at the 2023 Junior World Championships with 5 balls, taking 5th place. In August 2025, she announced that she is leaving the position.
