= Anna Shumilova =

Russian coach in rhythmic gymnastics

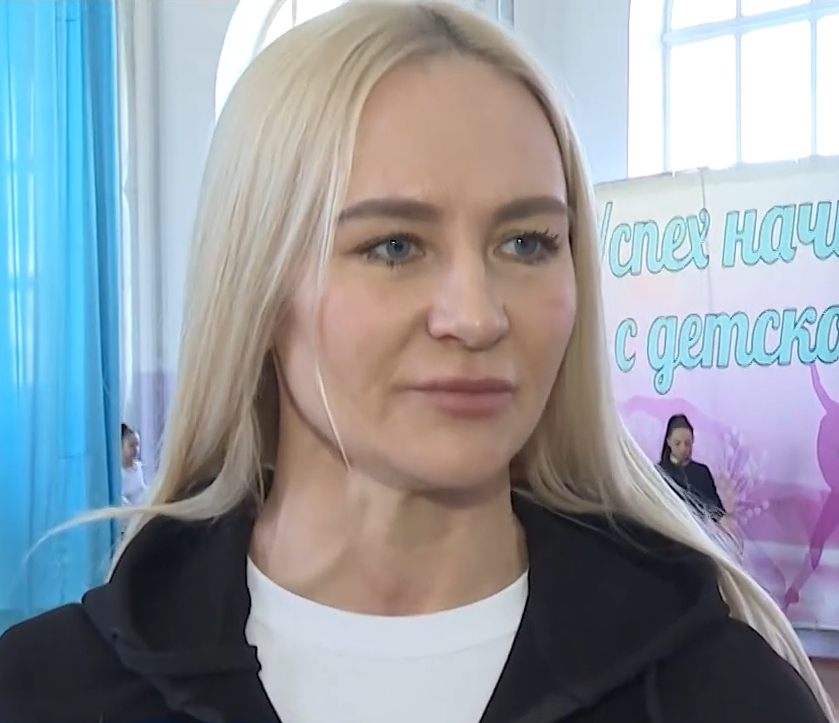
- Shumilova-Dyachenko in 2021
- Born: August 25, 1980 (age 44); Dmitrov, Russian SFSR, Soviet Union
- Occupation: Rhythmic Gymnastics coach
- Known for: Russian rhythmic gymnastics trainer in Club Dynamo - Dmitrov; coach of multiple World champions
- Spouse: Alexander Dyachenko
- Children: Inna Alexandrovna Dyachenko

Anna Vyacheslavovna Shumilova-Dyachenko (Russian: Анна Вячеславовна Шумилова-Дьяченко; born August 25, 1980) is a Russian honored Master of Sports coach in Rhythmic gymnastics.

== Personal life ==
She is married to 2012 Olympic champion in Canoe sprint, Alexander Dyachenko. Their daughter, Inna, was born in July 2014.

== Coaching career ==
A merited master of Sports in rhythmic gymnastics, Shumilova has been a coach of Club Dynamo - Dmitrov since 2003 and is a member of the Russian Rhythmic Gymnastics National Trainers.

Shumilova has produced Olympic and multiple World Champions notably Daria Kondakova and Alina Makarenko. She is coaching Aleksandra Soldatova, Daria Dubova, Anastasiia Tatareva, Maria Tolkacheva, and Veronika Polyakova.

== Notable trainees ==
- Daria Kondakova - three time all-around World silver medalist and four time World champion.
- Alina Makarenko - 2012 Olympics Group gold medalist.
- Aleksandra Soldatova - 2018 World ribbon champion, 2015 World silver medalist and 2016 Grand Prix Final champion.
- Anastasiia Tatareva - 2016 Olympics Group gold medalist, 2015 World Group All-around champion and (2014, 2015) European Group All-around champion.
- Maria Tolkacheva - 2016 Olympics Group gold medalist, 2015 World Group All-around champion and (2014, 2015) European Group All-around champion.
- Daria Dubova - 2014 Youth Olympic Group all-around gold medalist.
- Daria Svatkovskaya - 2013 European Hoop and team champion and 2012 Russian National all-around silver medalist
- Veronika Polyakova - European junior team gold medalist.
