= Darya Anenkova =

Russian rhythmic gymnast (born 1999)

- Full name: Darya Anenkova
- Born: 2 April 1999 (age 27) Moscow, Russia

Gymnastics career
- Discipline: Rhythmic gymnastics
- Country represented: Russia
- Club: Gazprom
- Gym: Novogorsk
- Head coach: Irina Viner
- Assistant coach: Natalia Orlova
Medal record
Representing Russia
Group Rhythmic Gymnastics
Youth Olympic Games
Gold medal – first place	2014 Nanjing	Group All-around

Darya Vladimirovna Anenkova (Russian: Дарья Владимировна Аненкова, born 2 April 1999 in Moscow, Russia) is a Russian Group rhythmic gymnast. She is the 2014 Youth Olympic Group all-around champion.

== Junior ==
Early in her career, Anenkova competed as an individual gymnast. She won the all-around silver medal behind compatriot Aleksandra Soldatova at the 2012 Gymnastik Schmiden International Tournament. In 2013, Anenkova began competing with the Russian Group.

In 2014, Anenkova competed with the Russian Group at the 2014 Moscow Grand Prix taking gold in Group all-around, following their placement, the Russian Group earned a qualification to compete for the Youth Olympic Games. On 26–27 August Anenkova, along with fellow group members (Daria Dubova, Victoria Ilina, Sofya Skomorokh, Natalia Safonova), competed at the 2014 Youth Olympic Games in Nanjing, China where they won gold in Group All-around finals.
