= 2018 World Aesthetic Group Gymnastics Championships =

International gymnastics competition

2018 World Aesthetic Gymnastics Championships
- Venue: SYMA Sports and Conference Centre
- Location: Budapest, Hungary
- Start date: 8 June 2018
- End date: 10 June 2018

The 2018 World Aesthetic Gymnastics Championships, the 19th edition of the Aesthetic group gymnastics competition, was held in Budapest, Hungary from June 8 to 10, at the SYMA Sports and Conference Centre.

== Participating nations ==
- Austria
- Bulgaria
- Canada
- Czech Republic
- Denmark
- Estonia
- Finland
- France
- Faroe Islands
- Hungary
- Italy
- Japan
- Moldova
- Malaysia
- Russia
- Spain
- Turkey
- Ukraine
- United States

== Medal winners ==
Event	Gold	Silver	Bronze
Senior Final	Madonna Russia Daria Zhdanova, Daria Kuklina, Polina Sosina, Alina Bolbat, Lyubov Palchikoa, Anastasiia Ponikarova, Alexandra Kuznetsova, Valeriya Uryupian, Sofiia Ostrovskaia	Minetit Finland Camilla Berg, Jessica Hakala, Venla Niemenmaa, Emmi Nikkilä, Siiri Puuska, Eveliina Rajajärvi, Ella Ratilainen, Riina Ruismäki, Pihla Silvennoinen, Milja Vuorenmaa	Expressia Russia Arina Nikishova, Varvara Kasimova, Evgeniya Shokarova, Daria Rudnichenko, Anastasia Kozhemyakina, Kamilia Suleimanova, Daria Dubova, Vanessa Sim
Junior Final	Victoria Russia Polina Furtseva, Anastasia Skuzovatkina, Anastasia Antoshina, Iuliia Smagina, Nadezhda Lazeikina, Anastasiia Zrazhevskaia, Polina Salnikova	Minetit Junior Finland Senja Aaltonen, Enni Bäckman, Tuuli Kankaanpää, Roosa Koski, Kaisa Mäkinen, Viivi Saarenrinne, Kristiina Steklova, Enni Söderling	Victoria Strela Russia Natalia Rodina, Elizaveta Kazantseva, Anastasia Pavlenova, Anna Shumikhina, Arina Maslova, Marina Arzhanykh, Maria Zhilina, Olga Liapina

== Results ==
=== Senior ===
The top 12 teams (2 per country) and the host country in Preliminaries qualify to the Finals.

Place	Nation	Name	Preliminaries	Final	Total
1st place, gold medalist(s)	Russia	Madonna	19.400 (1)	19.700 (1)	39.100
2nd place, silver medalist(s)	Finland	Minetit	19.350 (2)	19.600 (2)	38.950
3rd place, bronze medalist(s)	Russia	Expressia	19.300 (3)	19.550 (3)	38.850
4	Finland	OVO Team	18.650 (5)	19.350 (4)	38.000
5	Japan	Team Japan	18.750 (4)	18.550 (6)	37.300
6	Bulgaria	National team	18.300 (6)	18.900 (5)	37.200
7	Japan	Team Shoin	17.200 (11)	17.100 (7)	34.300
8	Estonia	GC Janika Tallinn	17.400 (9)	16.750 (9)	34.150
9	Ukraine	Alcor Avangard	17.200 (11)	16.850 (8)	34.050
10	Italy	Ardor	17.150 (13)	16.250 (11)	33.400
11	Canada	Allure	16.650 (15)	16.500 (10)	33.150
12	Spain	Cuitat de Barcelona Alcon	16.650 (15)	15.650 (12)	32.300
13	Hungary	Gracia	14.800 (25)	14.700 (13)	29.500
14	Finland	Gloria	17.850 (7)		17.850
14	Russia	Nebesa	17.850 (7)		17.850
16	Finland	Team Vantaa	17.400 (9)		17.400
17	Japan	JWCPE AGG Team	16.900 (14)		16.900
18	Austria	Tanzfabrik	16.300 (17)		16.300
19	Ukraine	Delice	16.050 (18)		16.050
20	Spain	INEF Barcelona	15.950 (19)		15.950
21	Ukraine	Vivend	15.550 (20)		15.550
22	Faroe Islands	Team Hydra	15.500 (21)		15.500
22	Canada	Rhythmic Expression	15.500 (21)		15.500
24	Denmark	Elina Elite	15.050 (23)		15.050
25	Italy	Team Minerva	14.950 (24)		14.950
26	Hungary	Lavender	14.750 (26)		14.750
27	Faroe Islands	Team Hulda	14.700 (27)		14.700
28	Czech Republic	SK MG Mantila Brno Zonja	14.350 (28)		14.350
29	Czech Republic	Team Vision	14.200 (29)		14.200
30	Denmark	Team Bohemia	13.600 (30)		13.600
31	France	Snow	11.450 (31)		11.450
32	Italy	Ginnastica ProVercelli 1892	11.250 (32)		11.250
33	France	Ohana	6.900 (33)		6.900
34	France	Divali	6.300 (34)		6.300

== Medal table ==
Rank	Nation	Gold	Silver	Bronze	Total
1	Russia (RUS)	4	0	2	6
2	Finland (FIN)	0	4	0	4
3	Estonia (EST)	0	0	1	1
3	Japan (JPN)	0	0	1	1
Totals (4 entries)		4	4	4	12
