= 2019 World Aesthetic Group Gymnastics Championships =

International gymnastics competition

2019 World Aesthetic Gymnastics Championships
- Venue: Sport palace of Cartagena
- Location: Cartagena, Spain
- Start date: 17 May 2019
- End date: 19 May 2019

The 2019 World Aesthetic Group Gymnastics Championships, the 20th edition of the Aesthetic group gymnastics competition, was held in Cartagena, Spain from May 17 to 19, at the Sport palace of Cartagena.

== Participating nations ==
- Austria
- Belarus
- Bulgaria
- Canada
- Czech Republic
- Denmark
- Estonia
- Finland
- France
- Faroe Islands
- Hungary
- Italy
- Japan
- Kazakhstan
- Luxembourg
- Moldova
- Malaysia
- Mexico
- Russia
- Slovenia
- Singapore
- Spain
- Ukraine
- United States
- Uzbekistan

== Medal winners ==
Event	Gold	Silver	Bronze
Senior Final	Madonna Russia Daria Kuklina, Polina Sosina, Alina Bolbat, Lyubov Palchikova, Anastasiia Ponikarova, Valeriya Uryupian, Sofiia Ostrovskaia, Viktoriia Prudnikova, Marina Onishchenko	Minetit Finland Camilla Berg, Venla Niemenmaa, Emmi Nikkilä, Siiri Puuska, Ella Ratilainen, Riina Ruismäki, Viivi Saarenrinne, Pihla Silvennoinen, Milja Vuorenmaa	OVO Team Finland Aino Handelberg, Angelica Kangas, Aurora Kapanen, Emma Koivunen, Karla Kuuskoski, Alli Laaksonen, Amanda Laukkonen, Alina Panula, Johanna Pulkkinen, Sara Rouhiainen, Malla Vartiainen, Olivia Yli-Juuti
Junior Final	OVO Junior team Finland Iina Anttila, Greta Hagberg, Tytti Ilvessalo, Viivi Inkinen, Erliette Kapanen, Ulrika Kohvakko, Kukka Koskenvuo, Iiris Koski, Kia Lehtiniemi, Olivia Soini, Ariana Temin	Victoria Strela Russia Maria Zhilina, Anastasia Skuzovatkina, Polina Furtseva, Elizaveta Shumikhina, Olga Liapina, Valeriia Sysoeva, Angelina Shnaider, Alina Baibekova	Victoria Russia Anastasia Pavlenova, Anastasiia Zrazhevskaia, Iuliia Smagina, Arina Maslova, Polina Salnikova, Anastasia Antoshina, Marina Arzhanykh
Country ranking
Senior Team	Russia; Madonna; Daria Kuklina, Polina Sosina, Alina Bolbat, Lyubov Palchikova, Anastasiia Ponikarova, Valeriya Uryupian, Sofiia Ostrovskaia, Viktoriia Prudnikova, Marina Onishchenko; Expressia; Anastasia Kozhemyakina, Arina Nikishova, Daria Rudnichenko, Vanessa Sim, Evgeniya Shokarova, Varvara Kasimova, Mariia Pavlova, Alina Kovalenko; Nebesa; Anna Evseenko, Margarita Ibraeva, Anita Volkova, Anzhelika Kravtsova, Sofya Krushanova, Daria Kleshcheva, Iana Khokhlova, Anna Bakshaeva, Anastasiia Fedorova	Finland; Minetit; Camilla Berg, Venla Niemenmaa, Emmi Nikkilä, Siiri Puuska, Ella Ratilainen, Riina Ruismäki, Viivi Saarenrinne, Pihla Silvennoinen, Milja Vuorenmaa; OVO Team; Aino Handelberg, Angelica Kangas, Aurora Kapanen, Emma Koivunen, Karla Kuuskoski, Alli Laaksonen, Amanda Laukkonen, Alina Panula, Johanna Pulkkinen, Sara Rouhiainen, Malla Vartiainen, Olivia Yli-juuti; Gloria; Matilda Andersson, Anna Luoto, Tuuli Mörsky, Noëlle Reijnen, Aada Stenfors, Ilona Valve, Ines Vierula, Maria Weikkola	Japan; Team Japan; Ayaka Maeda, Rinoka Ijuin, Mao Hamaguchi, Momoka Shimura, Nanaki Shimura, Himeno Takeuchi, Suzuna Karasawa, Ruria Takahashi, Haruka Ishii, Inori Kohashi; JWCPE AGG Team; Yuri Makita, Tomoka Igarashi, Mamiko Hamada, Mio Kono, Ayane Takayama, Noa Ishii, Hanako Kojima; Team Shoin; Bando Miu, Tatsumi Maho, Sato Yui, Sogawa Honoka, Takenaka Nao, Shirakawa Kotomi, Yamamoto Miyu, Tsuji Maho
Junior Team	Russia; Victoria Strela; Zhilina Maria, Skuzovatkina Anastasia, Furtseva Polina, Shumikhina Elizaveta, Liapina Olga, Sysoeva Valeriia, Shnaider Angelina, Baibekova Alina; Victoria; Pavlenova Anastasia, Zrazhevskaia Anastasiia, Smagina Iuliia, Maslova Arina, Salnikova Polina, Antoshina Anastasia, Arzhanykh Marina; Oscar; Serdechnaia Veronika, Varlashkina Vladislava, Manchenko Eva, Kuznetsova Anastasia, Bobyreva Anastasiia, Kalinichenko Yulia, Denisenko Anastasiia, Chuvashova Margarita	Finland; OVO Junior Team; Iina Anttila, Greta Hagberg, Tytti Ilvessalo, Viivi Inkinen, Erliette Kapanen, Ulrika Kohvakko, Kukka Koskenvuo, Iiris Koski, Kia Lehtiniemi, Olivia Soini, Ariana Temin; Minetit Elite; Airila Laura, Autio Emma, Holappa Tilda, Laine Emma, Leppelya Laura, Matila Ulrika, Muurasniemi Armida, Pietilä Lara; Illusion Junior; Gonzales-Kalla Sara, Hytönen Henni, Mäkitalo Tuuli, Sivill Neea, Hartman Sanni, Honkala Veera, Kiljunen Laura, Haatanen Oona, Lehtonen Emma, Vesterinen Maiju	Spain; Gimnasia San Anton Cartagena; Nadia Ponce, Ada Diaz, Sol Morales, Alba Chunwei Blaya, Sabina Rosa, Paola Moreno, Elena Garcia, Ainhoa Cavas, Gema Perez, Clara Perez; Ritmica Barcelona; Laia Herranz, Dana Fuste, Georgina Grau, Andrea Obelleiro, Laia Pinol, Rut Vives, Claudia Zabala, Gianira Boquete; Gymnos'85; Andrea-Sonsoles Gimenez-Bello, Gema Carretero, Cristina Marchak, Claudia Maria Cuello, Maria Teresa Marin, Luica Hernandez

== Results ==
=== Senior ===
The top 12 teams (2 per country) and the host country in Preliminaries qualify to the Finals.

Place	Nation	Name	Preliminaries	Final	Total
1st place, gold medalist(s)	Russia	Madonna	19.650 (1)	19.600 (1)	39.250
2nd place, silver medalist(s)	Finland	Minetit	19.450 (2)	19.350 (2)	38.800
3rd place, bronze medalist(s)	Finland	OVO Team	19.300 (3)	19.250 (4)	38.550
4	Russia	Expressia	19.200 (4)	19.300 (3)	38.500
5	Japan	Team Japan	18.600 (5)	18.400 (5)	37.000
6	Japan	JWCPE AGG Team	18.000 (7)	17.850 (7)	35.850
7	Estonia	Rytmika Elite Team	17.400 (10)	18.100 (6)	35.500
8	Estonia	Janika Elite Team	17.400 (10)	17.350 (8)	34.750
9	Italy	Ardor	17.200 (12)	17.350 (8)	34.550
10	Ukraine	Alcor Avangard	16.750 (14)	17.350 (8)	34.550
11	Spain	Cuitat de Barcelona - Alcon	16.750 (14)	17.000 (11)	33.750
12	Spain	Ritmica Cartagena	16.550 (16)	16.400 (13)	32.950
13	Canada	Rhythmic Expression	15.700 (17)	16.450 (12)	32.150
14	Russia	Nebesa	18.200 (6)		18.200
15	Finland	Gloria	17.750 (8)		17.750
16	Russia	Vdokhnovenie	17.900 (9)		17.900
17	Japan	Team Shoin	17.000 (13)		17.000
18	Austria	Tanzfabrik	15.700 (17)		15.700
19	Canada	YS Allure	15.550 (19)		15.550
20	Italy	Team Minerva Nervianese	15.500 (20)		15.500
21	Singapore	Team Singapore	15.400 (21)		15.400
22	Denmark	Elina Elite	15.400 (21)		15.400
23	Faroe Islands	Team Hulda	15.200 (23)		15.200
24	Spain	Gimnastica Sant Cugat	15.050 (24)		15.050
25	Faroe Islands	Team Vípan	15.000 (25)		15.000
26	Spain	INEF Barcelona United	14.850 (26)		14.850
27	Denmark	Navona	14.800 (27)		14.800
28	Estonia	Senior Team	14.750 (28)		14.750
29	Czech Republic	Team Zonja	14.600 (29)		14.600
30	Italy	Ginnastica Iris Firenze	13.800 (30)		13.800
31	Ukraine	Delice	13.800 (30)		13.800
32	Mexico	Charlotte's	13.050 (32)		13.050
33	Czech Republic	GK Sokol Opava	13.050 (32)		13.050
34	France	Snow	11.100 (34)		11.100
35	Hungary	Jenok	10.800 (35)		10.800
36	Luxembourg	Aurore Oetrange	9.600 (36)		9.600
37	Slovenia	Sport club Blescica	9.100 (37)		9.100
38	France	Espoir	8.800 (38)		8.800
39	France	Les Bichettes	7.200 (39)		7.200

== Medal table ==
Rank	Nation	Gold	Silver	Bronze	Total
1	Russia (RUS)	3	1	1	5
2	Finland (FIN)	1	3	1	5
3	Japan (JPN)	0	0	1	1
3	Spain (ESP)	0	0	1	1
Totals (4 entries)		4	4	4	12
