= 2014 Aesthetic Group Gymnastics World Cup series =

International gymnastics competition series

The 2014 IFAGG World Cup series in Aesthetic Group Gymnastics is a series of competitions officially organized and promoted by the International Federation of Aesthetic Group Gymnastics.

== Formats ==
World and Challenge Cup
Date	Event	Location
November 29-01	World Cup I	(Spain) Cartagena
February 07-09	World Cup II and Challenge Cup I	(Estonia) Tartu
March 20-22	World Cup III and Challenge Cup II	(Bulgaria) Sofia
April 25-27	World Cup IV and Challenge Cup III	(Finland) Helsinki

== Medal winners ==
=== World Cup ===
Competitions	Gold	Silver	Bronze
World Cup
Cartagena	(Russia) Madonna	(Russia) Expressia	(Finland) Sanix
Tartu	(Russia) Madonna	(Estonia) GC Janika Sunshine	(Russia) Expressia
Sofia	(Bulgaria) National Team	(Estonia) GC Janika Sunshine	(Russia) Expressia
Helsinki	(Russia) Madonna	(Bulgaria) National Team	(Finland) OVO Team

=== Challenge Cup ===
Competitions	Gold	Silver	Bronze
Challenge Cup
Tartu	(Russia) Victoria	(Finland) Minetit	(Finland) OVO Junior Team
Sofia	(Russia) Victoria	(Finland) OVO Junior Team	(Bulgaria) National Team
Helsinki	(Russia) Victoria	(Finland) Minetit	(Bulgaria) National Team

== Overall medal table ==
Rank	Nation	Gold	Silver	Bronze	Total
1	Russia (RUS)	6	1	2	9
2	Bulgaria (BUL)	1	1	2	4
3	Finland (FIN)	0	3	3	6
4	Estonia (EST)	0	2	0	2
Totals (4 entries)		7	7	7	21
