= Goussainville =

Goussainville is the name of two communes of France:

- Goussainville, Eure-et-Loir in the Eure-et-Loir département
- Goussainville, Val-d'Oise in the Val-d'Oise département

== See also ==
- Gussainville, a commune in the Meuse département
