= 2013 Rhythmic Gymnastics European Championships =

- Venue: Wiener Stadthalle
- Location: Vienna, Austria
- Start date: 31 May 2013
- End date: 2 June 2013
- Nations: 34 members of the European Union of Gymnastics

The 29th Rhythmic Gymnastics European Championships took place from May 31 to June 2, 2013 at the Wiener Stadthalle in Vienna, Austria including 34 National Federations.

== Medal winners ==
| Event | Gold | Silver | Bronze |
|---|---|---|---|
Senior Finals
| Team | Russia; Yana Kudryavtseva; Margarita Mamun; Daria Svatkovskaya | Ukraine; Alina Maksymenko; Viktoria Mazur; Ganna Rizatdinova | Belarus; Arina Charopa; Katsiaryna Halkina; Melitina Staniouta |
| Hoop | Daria Svatkovskaya; Russia | Margarita Mamun; Russia | Melitina Staniouta; Belarus |
| Ball | Yana Kudryavtseva; Russia | Margarita Mamun; Russia | Silviya Miteva; Bulgaria |
| Clubs | Yana Kudryavtseva; Russia | Margarita Mamun; Russia | Melitina Staniouta; Belarus |
| Ribbon | Margarita Mamun; Russia | Ganna Rizatdinova; Ukraine | Silviya Miteva; Bulgaria |
Junior Group Finals
| Group All-around | Russia; Anna Berkutova; Daria Pirogova; Daria Dubova; Victoria Ilina; Natalia Safonova | Belarus; Yauheniya Vensko; Vlada Zyryanova; Krystsina Sheida; Yana Chornaya; Katsiaryna Dalinkina; Khrystsina Novikava | Bulgaria; Elena Bineva; Aleksandra Mitrovich; Laura Traets; Emiliya Radicheva; Sofiya Rangelova |
| 5 hoops | Russia; Anna Berkutova; Daria Pirogova; Daria Dubova; Victoria Ilina; Natalia Safonova | Azerbaijan; Gulsum Shafizada; Nilufar Niftaliyeva; Sabina Hummatova; Aliaksandra Platonova; Emilya Bagiyeva | Belarus; Yauheniya Vensko; Vlada Zyryanova; Krystsina Sheida; Yana Chornaya; Katsiaryna Dalinkina; Khrystsina Novikava |

== Results ==
=== Seniors ===
==== Team ====
| Rank | Nation | Hoop (rhythmic gymnastics) | Ball (rhythmic gymnastics) | Clubs (rhythmic gymnastics) | Ribbon (rhythmic gymnastics) | Total |
|---|---|---|---|---|---|---|
| 1st place, gold medalist(s) | Russia | 36.533 | 36.999 | 36.500 | 37.082 | 147.114 |
| 2nd place, silver medalist(s) | Ukraine | 35.108 | 35.332 | 35.783 | 35.350 | 141.573 |
| 3rd place, bronze medalist(s) | Belarus | 32.483 | 35.333 | 35.200 | 35.099 | 138.115 |
| 4 | Azerbaijan | 34.383 | 35.007 | 33.341 | 34.616 | 137.347 |
| 5 | Israel | 34.399 | 34.633 | 33.516 | 33.983 | 136.531 |
| 6 | Bulgaria | 34.416 | 34.433 | 33.366 | 34.183 | 136.398 |
| 7 | Austria | 32.741 | 33.682 | 34.066 | 33.074 | 133.563 |
| 8 | Spain | 33.866 | 31.449 | 33.850 | 31.475 | 130.640 |
| 9 | Italy | 31.799 | 31.449 | 31.766 | 31.933 | 126.947 |
| 10 | Finland | 31.541 | 31.999 | 31.858 | 30.232 | 125.630 |
| 11 | Czech Republic | 31.483 | 30.966 | 30.366 | 30.899 | 123.714 |
| 12 | Estonia | 31.207 | 31.583 | 30.441 | 30.016 | 123.247 |
| 13 | Hungary | 31.066 | 31.149 | 30.033 | 30.091 | 122.339 |
| 14 | Georgia | 30.274 | 30.566 | 31.449 | 29.983 | 122.272 |
| 15 | Greece | 31.458 | 28.149 | 29.533 | 32.200 | 121.34 |
| 16 | Moldova | 30.800 | 29.157 | 30.191 | 30.766 | 120.914 |
| 17 | France | 31.666 | 27.691 | 30.750 | 30.266 | 120.373 |
| 18 | Latvia | 29.408 | 29.866 | 30.500 | 30.499 | 120.273 |
| 19 | Poland | 30.258 | 30.199 | 30.116 | 29.607 | 120.180 |
| 20 | Slovenia | 29.916 | 30.599 | 29.066 | 27.674 | 117.255 |
| 21 | Romania | 29.199 | 29.649 | 28.974 | 27.816 | 115.638 |
| 22 | Sweden | 29.458 | 29.266 | 27.783 | 28.766 | 115.273 |
| 23 | Cyprus | 29.341 | 29.241 | 28.099 | 28.324 | 115.005 |
| 24 | Armenia | 28.591 | 28.833 | 27.066 | 29.724 | 114.214 |
| 25 | Croatia | 29.749 | 28.874 | 27.033 | 28.407 | 114.063 |
| 26 | Portugal | 28.274 | 29.032 | 27.916 | 27.899 | 113.121 |
| 27 | Turkey | 27.891 | 30.516 | 28.108 | 26.066 | 112.581 |
| 28 | Slovakia | 27.708 | 28.632 | 23.524 | 27.299 | 107.163 |
| 29 | Lithuania | 25.807 | 27.333 | 25.958 | 23.458 | 102.556 |
| 30 | Norway | 25.157 | 24.833 | 25.874 | 26.024 | 101.888 |

==== Hoop ====
| Rank | Gymnast | Nation | D Score | E Score | Pen. | Total |
|---|---|---|---|---|---|---|
| 1st place, gold medalist(s) | Daria Svatkovskaya | Russia | 9.300 | 9.300 | | 18.600 |
| 2nd place, silver medalist(s) | Margarita Mamun | Russia | 9.300 | 9.266 | | 18.566 |
| 3rd place, bronze medalist(s) | Melitina Staniouta | Belarus | 9.050 | 9.200 | | 18.250 |
| 4 | Sylvia Miteva | Bulgaria | 8.800 | 8.933 | | 17.733 |
| 5 | Marina Durunda | Azerbaijan | 8.750 | 8.900 | | 17.650 |
| 6 | Neta Rivkin | Israel | 8.700 | 8.866 | | 17.566 |
| 7 | Viktoria Mazur | Ukraine | 8.525 | 8.966 | | 17.491 |
| 8 | Ganna Rizatdinova | Ukraine | 8.600 | 8.433 | | 17.033 |

==== Ball ====
Kudryavtseva became the first rhythmic gymnast to score a 19 points (19.000) under the new 2013-16 Code of Points.

| Rank | Gymnast | Nation | D Score | E Score | Pen. | Total |
|---|---|---|---|---|---|---|
| 1st place, gold medalist(s) | Yana Kudryavtseva | Russia | 9.500 | 9.500 | | 19.000 |
| 2nd place, silver medalist(s) | Margarita Mamun | Russia | 9.300 | 9.333 | | 18.633 |
| 3rd place, bronze medalist(s) | Sylvia Miteva | Bulgaria | 9.050 | 9.100 | | 18.150 |
| 4 | Ganna Rizatdinova | Ukraine | 9.000 | 9.033 | | 18.033 |
| 5 | Marina Durunda | Azerbaijan | 8.800 | 8.900 | | 17.700 |
| 6 | Melitina Staniouta | Belarus | 8.550 | 8.733 | | 17.283 |
| 7 | Neta Rivkin | Israel | 8.450 | 8.733 | | 17.183 |
| 8 | Alina Maksymenko | Ukraine | 8.200 | 8.633 | | 16.833 |

==== Clubs ====
| Rank | Gymnast | Nation | D Score | E Score | Pen. | Total |
|---|---|---|---|---|---|---|
| 1st place, gold medalist(s) | Yana Kudryavtseva | Russia | 9.350 | 9.433 | | 18.783 |
| 2nd place, silver medalist(s) | Margarita Mamun | Russia | 9.250 | 9.400 | | 18.650 |
| 3rd place, bronze medalist(s) | Melitina Staniouta | Belarus | 8.950 | 9.166 | | 18.116 |
| 4 | Sylvia Miteva | Bulgaria | 8.950 | 9.066 | | 18.016 |
| 5 | Alina Maksymenko | Ukraine | 8.900 | 9.000 | | 17.900 |
| 6 | Ganna Rizatdinova | Ukraine | 8.750 | 8.966 | | 17.716 |
| 7 | Lala Yusifova | Azerbaijan | 8.550 | 8.800 | | 17.350 |
| 8 | Caroline Weber | Austria | 8.500 | 8.733 | | 17.233 |

==== Ribbon ====
| Rank | Gymnast | Nation | D Score | E Score | Pen. | Total |
|---|---|---|---|---|---|---|
| 1st place, gold medalist(s) | Margarita Mamun | Russia | 9.400 | 9.400 | | 18.800 |
| 2nd place, silver medalist(s) | Ganna Rizatdinova | Ukraine | 9.150 | 9.033 | | 18.183 |
| 3rd place, bronze medalist(s) | Sylvia Miteva | Bulgaria | 9.100 | 9.000 | | 18.100 |
| 4 | Yana Kudryavtseva | Russia | 8.950 | 9.033 | | 17.983 |
| 5 | Marina Durunda | Azerbaijan | 8.800 | 8.966 | | 17.766 |
| 6 | Alina Maksymenko | Ukraine | 8.750 | 8.833 | 0.05 | 17.533 |
| 7 | Melitina Staniouta | Belarus | 8.575 | 8.866 | | 17.441 |
| 8 | Varvara Filiou | Greece | 8.200 | 8.325 | | 16.525 |

=== Juniors ===
==== Group All-around ====
| Rank | Nation | Hoop (rhythmic gymnastics) | Hoop (rhythmic gymnastics) | Total |
|---|---|---|---|---|
| 1st place, gold medalist(s) | Russia | 17.100 | 16.816 | 33.916 |
| 2nd place, silver medalist(s) | Belarus | 16.450 | 16.250 | 32.700 |
| 3rd place, bronze medalist(s) | Bulgaria | 16.266 | 16.266 | 32.532 |
| 4 | Azerbaijan | 15.916 | 16.075 | 31.991 |
| 5 | Israel | 15.500 | 16.450 | 31.950 |
| 6 | Italy | 15.750 | 15.641 | 31.391 |
| 7 | Switzerland | 15.433 | 15.833 | 31.266 |
| 8 | Ukraine | 15.208 | 15.683 | 30.891 |
| 9 | Czech Republic | 15.000 | 15.300 | 30.300 |
| 10 | Hungary | 14.500 | 15.666 | 30.166 |
| 11 | Estonia | 15.150 | 15.000 | 30.150 |
| 12 | Germany | 14.833 | 14.533 | 29.366 |
| 13 | Latvia | 14.583 | 14.750 | 29.333 |
| 14 | Finland | 14.258 | 14.516 | 28.774 |
| 15 | France | 14.683 | 14.016 | 28.699 |
| 16 | Spain | 13.816 | 14.791 | 28.607 |
| 17 | Austria | 13.133 | 15.100 | 28.233 |
| 18 | Serbia | 13.900 | 14.183 | 28.083 |
| 19 | Turkey | 13.916 | 13.600 | 27.516 |
| 20 | Slovakia | 13.033 | 13.600 | 26.633 |
| 21 | Lithuania | 13.633 | 12.666 | 26.299 |
| 22 | Norway | 12.200 | 12.266 | 25.466 |
| 23 | Poland | 12.066 | 13.166 | 25.232 |
| 24 | Romania | 10.716 | 11.775 | 22.491 |

==== Group: 5 hoops ====
| Rank | Nation | D Score | E Score | Pen. | Total |
|---|---|---|---|---|---|
| 1st place, gold medalist(s) | Russia | 7.950 | 9.200 | | 17.150 |
| 2nd place, silver medalist(s) | Azerbaijan | 7.650 | 8.900 | | 16.550 |
| 3rd place, bronze medalist(s) | Belarus | 7.550 | 8.775 | | 16.325 |
| 4 | Israel | 7.500 | 8.733 | | 16.233 |
| 5 | Bulgaria | 7.500 | 8.533 | | 16.033 |
| 6 | Italy | 7.300 | 8.566 | | 15.866 |
| 7 | Ukraine | 7.300 | 8.466 | | 15.766 |
| 8 | Switzerland | 7.250 | 8.500 | | 15.750 |

== Medal count ==
=== Seniors ===
| Rank | Nation | Gold | Silver | Bronze | Total |
|---|---|---|---|---|---|
| 1 | Russia | 5 | 3 | 0 | 8 |
| 2 | Ukraine | 0 | 2 | 0 | 2 |
| 3 | Belarus | 0 | 0 | 3 | 3 |
| 4 | Bulgaria | 0 | 0 | 2 | 2 |
| Totals (4 entries) | | 5 | 5 | 5 | 15 |

=== Juniors ===
| Rank | Nation | Gold | Silver | Bronze | Total |
|---|---|---|---|---|---|
| 1 | Russia | 2 | 0 | 0 | 2 |
| 2 | Belarus | 0 | 1 | 1 | 2 |
| 3 | Azerbaijan | 0 | 1 | 0 | 1 |
| 4 | Bulgaria | 0 | 0 | 1 | 1 |
| Totals (4 entries) | | 2 | 2 | 2 | 6 |
