= 2016 Aesthetic Group Gymnastics World Cup series =

Gymnastics competition series

The 2016 IFAGG World Cup series in Aesthetic Group Gymnastics is a series of competitions officially organized and promoted by the International Federation of Aesthetic Group Gymnastics.

== Formats ==
World and Challenge Cup
Date	Event	Location
November 27–29	World and Challenge Cup I	(Hungary) Budapest
March 18–20	World and Challenge Cup II	(Finland) Espoo
April 15–17	World and Challenge Cup III	(Bulgaria) Sofia
May 6–08	World and Challenge Cup IV	(Spain) Barcelona

== Medal winners ==
=== World Cup ===
Competitions	Gold	Silver	Bronze
World Cup
Budapest	(Russia) Expressia	(Finland) Minetit	(Russia) Madonna
Espoo	(Finland) Minetit	(Russia) Madonna	(Finland) OVO Team
Sofia	(Russia) Expressia	(Finland) Minetit	(Bulgaria) National Team
Barcelona	(Russia) Expressia	(Russia) Madonna	(Finland) Minetit

=== Challenge Cup ===
Competitions	Gold	Silver	Bronze
Challenge Cup
Budapest	(Russia) Victoria	(Finland) Minetit Junior	(Estonia) Janika Diamonds
Espoo	(Finland) OVO Junior Team	(Finland) Minetit Junior	None Awarded
Espoo	(Finland) OVO Junior Team	(Estonia) Janika Diamonds	None Awarded
Sofia	(Russia) Victoria	(Finland) Minetit Junior	(Estonia) Janika Diamonds
Barcelona	(Russia) Victoria	(Finland) OVO Junior Team	(Finland) Minetit Junior

== Final ranking ==
=== World Cup ===
Rank	Team	World Cup I	World Cup II	World Cup III	World Cup IV	Total
1	Expressia (Russia)	12		12	18	42
2	Minetit (Finland)	10	12	10	12	34
3	Madonna (Russia)	8	10		15	33
4	OVO Team (Finland)	7	8	7	10,5	25,5
5	National Team (Bulgaria)			10	9	19
6	Perfetto (Estonia)	6	6	5	6	18
7	Nebesa (Russia)	0	7	6		13
8	INEF Barcelona (Spain)	5			4,5	9,5
9	Janika Tallinn Senior (Estonia)		5	4		9
10	Team Japan				7,5	7,5
11	Alcon Cusi (Spain)	4			1,5	5,5

=== Challenge Cup ===
Rank	Team	World Cup I	World Cup II	World Cup III	World Cup IV	Total
1	Victoria (Russia)	12		12	12	36
2	Minetit Junior (Finland)	10	10	10	8	30
3	OVO Junior team (Finland)	0	12	7	10	29
4	Janika Diamonds (Estonia)	8	10	8	7	26
5	Sonet (Russia)	7			7	14
6	Roxett (Russia)	0	7	6		13
7	Ardor Junior (Italy)	5		3	3	11
8	United Team (Bulgaria)			5	5	10
9	Etar Elite (Bulgaria)	4		4		8

Note: Only three best results count.

== Overall medal table ==
Rank	Nation	Gold	Silver	Bronze	Total
1	Russia (RUS)	6	2	1	9
2	Finland (FIN)	2	6	3	11
3	Estonia (EST)	0	1	2	3
4	Bulgaria (BUL)	0	0	1	1
Totals (4 entries)		8	9	7	24
