= 2015 Aesthetic Group Gymnastics World Cup series =

International gymnastics competition series

The 2015 IFAGG World Cup series in Aesthetic Group Gymnastics is a series of competitions officially organized and promoted by the International Federation of Aesthetic Group Gymnastics.

== Formats ==
World and Challenge Cup
| Date | Event | Location |
| November 28-30 | World and Challenge Cup I | (Spain) Pinto |
| February 20-22 | World and Challenge Cup II | (Estonia) Tartu |
| March 19-21 | World and Challenge Cup III | (Bulgaria) Sofia |
| April 24-26 | World and Challenge Cup IV | (Finland) Tampere |

== Medal winners ==
=== World Cup ===
| Competitions | Gold | Silver | Bronze |
|---|---|---|---|
World Cup
| Pinto | (Russia) Expressia | (Russia) Madonna | (Finland) OVO Team |
| Tartu | (Russia) Madonna | (Russia) Expressia | (Finland) Minetit |
| Sofia | (Russia) Expressia | (Finland) Minetit | (Bulgaria) National Team |
| Tampere | (Russia) Expressia | (Finland) Minetit | (Bulgaria) National Team |

=== Challenge Cup ===
| Competitions | Gold | Silver | Bronze |
|---|---|---|---|
Challenge Cup
| Tartu | (Russia) Victoria | (Finland) Minetit Juniors | (Estonia) GC Janika Diamonds |
| Sofia | (Russia) Victoria | (Finland) Minetit Juniors | (Bulgaria) National Team |
| Tampere | (Russia) Victoria | (Finland) Minetit Juniors | (Bulgaria) National Team |

== Overall medal table ==
| Rank | Nation | Gold | Silver | Bronze | Total |
|---|---|---|---|---|---|
| 1 | Russia (RUS) | 7 | 2 | 0 | 9 |
| 2 | Finland (FIN) | 0 | 5 | 2 | 7 |
| 3 | Bulgaria (BUL) | 0 | 0 | 4 | 4 |
| 4 | Estonia (EST) | 0 | 0 | 1 | 1 |
| Totals (4 entries) | | 7 | 7 | 7 | 21 |
