= Russian Gymnastics Federation =

Sports governing body in Russia

The Russian Gymnastics Federation (RGF; Russian: Федерация гимнастики России, romanized: Federatsiya gimnastiki Rossii) is the governing body of gymnastics in Russia.

The Russian Gymnastics Federation is a member federation of the European Union of Gymnastics.

== History ==
The Russian Gymnastics Federation was established on 1 October 2024 as a result of merging five Russian sports federations governing specific gymnastics disciplines (artistic gymnastics, rhythmic gymnastics, trampolining, sport acrobatics and sport aerobics).

Russian Railways president Oleg Belozerov was elected head of the united federation in a one-candidate election held on the same day.

== See also ==
- Artistic Gymnastics Federation of Russia
- Russian Rhythmic Gymnastics Federation
