= 2018 Aesthetic Group Gymnastics World Cup series =

Gymnastics competition series

The 2018 IFAGG World Cup series in Aesthetic Group Gymnastics is a series of competitions officially organized and promoted by the International Federation of Aesthetic Group Gymnastics.

== Formats ==
World and Challenge Cup
Date	Event	Location
March 17-18	World and Challenge Cup I	(Finland) Vantaa
April 14-15	World and Challenge Cup II	(Austria) Graz
October 26-27	World and Challenge Cup III	(France) Paris
November 22-23	World and Challenge Cup IV	(Brazil) Santos

== Medal winners ==
=== World Cup ===
Competitions	Gold	Silver	Bronze
World Cup
Vantaa	(Finland) Minetit	(Russia) Madonna	(Russia) Expressia
Graz	(Russia) Madonna	(Finland) Minetit	(Russia) Expressia
Paris	(Russia) Madonna	(Finland) Minetit	None Awarded
Paris	(Russia) Madonna	(Russia) Expressia	None Awarded
Santos	(Russia) Madonna	(Finland) Minetit	(Russia) Expressia

=== Challenge Cup ===
Competitions	Gold	Silver	Bronze
Challenge Cup
Vantaa	(Russia) Victoria	(Finland) Minetit Junior	(Russia) Victoria Strela
Graz	(Russia) Victoria	(Finland) Minetit Junior	(Russia) Victoria Strela
Paris	(Russia) Victoria	(Finland) OVO Junior Team	(Russia) Victoria Strela
Santos	(Russia) Victoria	(Finland) OVO Junior Team	(Estonia) Junior Team

== Final ranking ==
=== World Cup ===
Rank	Team	World Cup I	World Cup II	World Cup III	World Cup IV	Total
1	Madonna (Russia)	11	12	12	18	42
2	Minetit (Finland)	12	11	11	16,5	39,5
3	Expressia (Russia)	10	10	11	15	36
4	OVO Team (Finland)	9	9	9	13,5	31,5
5	Alcor Avangard (Ukraine)	0	5	8	0	13
6	Ardor (Italy)	6	0	7	0	13
7	Rhythmic Expression (Canada)	0	0	0	12	12

Note: Only three best results count.

== Overall medal table ==
Rank	Nation	Gold	Silver	Bronze	Total
1	Russia (RUS)	7	2	6	15
2	Finland (FIN)	1	7	0	8
3	Estonia (EST)	0	0	1	1
Totals (3 entries)		8	9	7	24

== See also ==
- 2018 World Aesthetic Group Gymnastics Championships
