= 2017 Aesthetic Group Gymnastics World Cup series =

Gymnastics competition series

The 2017 IFAGG World Cup series in Aesthetic Group Gymnastics is a series of competitions officially organized and promoted by the International Federation of Aesthetic Group Gymnastics.

== Formats ==
World and Challenge Cup
| Date | Event | Location |
| February 11-12 | World and Challenge Cup I | (Estonia) Tartu |
| April 1-2 | World and Challenge Cup II | (Italy) Padua |
| October 27-28 | World and Challenge Cup III | (Bulgaria) Sofia |
| November 25-26 | World and Challenge Cup IV | (United States) Chicago |

== Medal winners ==
=== World Cup ===
| Competitions | Gold | Silver | Bronze |
|---|---|---|---|
World Cup
| Tartu | (Russia) Madonna | (Russia) Expressia | (Finland) Minetit |
| Padua | (Finland) Minetit | (Russia) Expressia | (Russia) Madonna |
| Sofia | (Russia) Madonna | (Finland) Minetit | None Awarded |
| Sofia | (Russia) Madonna | (Russia) Expressia | None Awarded |
| Chicago | (Finland) OVO Team | (Finland) Minetit | (Japan) JWCPE AGG Team |

=== Challenge Cup ===
| Competitions | Gold | Silver | Bronze |
|---|---|---|---|
Challenge Cup
| Tartu | (Finland) Minetit Elite Junior | (Finland) OVO Junior Team | (Russia) Victoria |
| Padua | (Finland) Minetit Elite Junior | (Finland) OVO Junior Team | (Russia) Victoria |
| Sofia | (Finland) OVO Junior Team | (Russia) Victoria | (Finland) Minetit Elite Junior |
| Chicago | (Finland) Minetit Elite Junior | (Finland) OVO Junior Team | (Estonia) GC Janika Mireth |

== Final ranking ==
=== World Cup ===
| Rank | Team | World Cup I | World Cup II | World Cup III | World Cup IV | Total |
|---|---|---|---|---|---|---|
| 1 | Minetit (Finland) | 10 | 12 | 11 | 16,5 | 49,5 |
| 2 | OVO Team (Finland) | 9 | 9 | 9 | 18 | 36 |
| 3 | Expressia (Russia) | 11 | 11 | 12 | 0 | 34 |
| 4 | Madonna (Russia) | 12 | 10 | 11 | 0 | 33 |
| 5 | GC Rytmika Perfetto (Estonia) | 6 | 5 | 7 | 13,5 | 26,5 |
| 6 | Ardor (Italy) | 7 | 6 | 0 | 12 | 25 |
| 7 | Alcor Avangard (Ukraine) | 5 | 4 | 5 | 10,5 | 20,5 |
| 8 | GC Janika Diamonds (Estonia) | 8 | 7 | 0 | 0 | 15 |
| 8 | JWCPE AGG Team (Japan) | 0 | 0 | 0 | 15 | 15 |

== Overall medal table ==
| Rank | Nation | Gold | Silver | Bronze | Total |
|---|---|---|---|---|---|
| 1 | Finland (FIN) | 6 | 5 | 2 | 13 |
| 2 | Russia (RUS) | 2 | 4 | 3 | 9 |
| 3 | Estonia (EST) | 0 | 0 | 1 | 1 |
| 3 | Japan (JPN) | 0 | 0 | 1 | 1 |
| Totals (4 entries) | | 8 | 9 | 7 | 24 |
