= Aesthetic Group Gymnastics World Cup =

- Current season, competition or edition: 2023 Aesthetic Group Gymnastics World Cup series
- Sport: Aesthetic group gymnastics
- Founded: 2005
- Countries: Worldwide

The Aesthetic Group Gymnastics World Cup is a competition for aesthetic group gymnastics sanctioned by the International Federation of Aesthetic Group Gymnastics (IFAGG). It is one of the few tournaments in aesthetic group gymnastics officially organized by IFAGG, as well as the World Championships and the European Championships. There are two types, which are organised at the same time – World Cup is for senior teams and Challenge Cup is for junior teams.

== World Cup ranking ==
There are four partial World Cup and Challenge Cup competitions, where teams can earn ranking points for World Cup and Challenge Cup final ranking. Final ranking is counted from the total sum of three best results (points) of team from four competitions during the season. Ranking point are given to the teams in every World Cup and Challenge Cup after final result (total points) of competition (preliminaries points and finals points). In World Cup and Challenge Cup Final competition points are given 1.5 time normal ranking points. Since 2022, the points collection system has been abandoned.

== World Cup Final medalists ==
Listed below are the teams that scored among top 3 in final World Cup ranking, achieving most points of all.

=== Senior ===
Year	Location	Gold	Silver	Bronze
2005		Russia; Oscar	Estonia; Piruett	Finland; Frida Vantaa
2006		Bulgaria; Bulgaria	Russia; Roxett	Estonia; Piruett
2007	(Bulgaria) Sofia	Bulgaria; Bulgaria	Russia; Oscar	Finland; Deltat/OVO
2008	(Finland) Helsinki	Finland; Deltat/OVO	Russia; Oscar	
2009		Russia; Oscar	Russia; Madonna	Finland; Deltat/OVO
2010	(Germany) Paderborn	Finland; Ampeerit/OVO	Russia; Madonna	Russia; Nebesa
2011	(Russia) Moscow	Russia; Madonna		
2012	(Bulgaria) Varna	Russia; Madonna		
2013	(Spain) Barcelona	Russia; Madonna		
2014	(Finland) Helsinki	Russia; Madonna	Finland; Minetit	
2015	(Finland) Tampere	Russia; Expressia	Finland; Minetit	Russia; Madonna
2016	(Spain) Barcelona	Russia; Expressia	Finland; Minetit	Russia; Madonna
2017	(United States) Chicago	Finland; Minetit	Finland; OVO Team	Russia; Expressia
2018	(Brazil) São Paulo	Russia; Madonna	Finland; Minetit	Russia; Expressia
2019	(Hungary) Budapest	Russia; Madonna	Finland; OVO Team	Finland; Minetit
2022	(Malaysia) Kuala Lumpur	Russia; Expressia	Russia; Madonna	Kazakhstan; Kerbez
2023	(Italy) Chiari	Bulgaria; The National Team	Finland; Minetit	Bulgaria; National Team
2024	Hong Kong	Russia; Expressia	Russia; Vdokhnovenie	Japan; JWCPE AGG Team
2025	(Malaysia) Kuala Lumpur	Russia; Expressia	Russia; Vdokhnovenie	Japan; JWCPE AGG Team
2026	(Hungary) Budapest	Russia; Expressia	Russia; Madonna	Bulgaria; National Team

=== Junior ===
Year	Location	Gold	Silver	Bronze
2008	(Finland) Helsinki	Russia; Roxett		
2009		Russia; Victoria		
2010	(Germany) Paderborn	Russia; Victoria		
2013	(Spain) Barcelona	Russia; Victoria	Finland; Minetit Junior	
2014	(Finland) Helsinki	Russia; Victoria	Finland; Minetit Junior	
2015	(Finland) Tampere	Russia; Victoria	Finland; Minetit Junior	Estonia; Janika Diamonds
2016	(Spain) Barcelona	Russia; Victoria	Finland; Minetit Junior	Finland; OVO Junior Team
2017	(United States) Chicago	Finland; Minetit Elite	Finland; OVO Junior team	Russia; Victoria
2018	(Brazil) São Paulo	Russia; Victoria	Finland; OVO Junior Team	Russia; Victoria Strela
2019	(Hungary) Budapest	Russia; Victoria	Russia; Victoria Strela	Finland; OVO Junior Team
2022	(Malaysia) Kuala Lumpur	Russia; Victoria	Russia; Victoria Strela	Kazakhstan; Sunrise
2023	(Italy) Chiari	Finland; Minetit Junior	Bulgaria; National Team	Finland; OVO Junior Team
2024	Hong Kong	Russia; Victoria	Russia; Victoria Strela	Kazakhstan; Alan Junior
2025	(Malaysia) Kuala Lumpur	Russia; Madonna Junior	Russia; Victoria	Kazakhstan; ALEM
2026	(Hungary) Budapest	Russia; Madonna Junior	Finland; Minetit Junior	Bulgaria; National Team
