= Finland at the World Aesthetic Group Gymnastics Championships =

- WA code: FIN
- National federation: Suomen Voimisteluliitto
- Website: www.voimistelu.fi
- Medals Ranked 2nd: Gold 21 Silver 17 Bronze 11 Total 49

World Aesthetic Group Gymnastics Championships appearances (overview)
- auto

Finland has competed at every edition of the World Aesthetic Group Gymnastics Championships since its inception in 2000. In fact, the first edition of World Championships in Aesthetic group gymnastics was held in Helsinki, Finland. It has been the second most successful nation at the global competition for Aesthetic group gymnastics. By the end of the 2022 World Championships, its gymnasts had won a total of 45 medals, being the most successful nation. As one of the foremost nations in the sport internationally, its delegation for the championships are among the largest.

Finnish teams did not attend the 2023 World Aesthetic Group Gymnastics Championships in Almaty, Kazakhstan, in protest against the participation of Russian and Belarusian teams.

== Medal table ==
Championships	Senior			Championships	Junior			Total		
Championships	Gold	Silver	Bronze	Championships	Gold	Silver	Bronze	Gold	Silver	Bronze
2000 Helsinki	1	0	1	No junior event				1	0	1
2001 Tallinn	0	1	1	No junior event				0	1	1
2002 Prague	1	0	0	No junior event				1	0	0
2003 Graz	1	1	0	No junior event				1	1	0
2004 Sofia	1	0	0	No junior event				1	0	0
2005 Copenhagen	0	1	0	2005 Plzen	1	0	0	1	1	0
2006 Tampere	1	0	0	2006 Tallinn	1	0	0	2	0	0
2007 Salou	0	0	0	2007 Espoo	1	0	1	1	0	1
2008 Toronto	1	0	0	2008 Cartagena	1	0	0	2	0	0
2009 Moscow	1	0	0	2009 Rostov-on-Don	0	0	0	1	0	0
2010 Varna	1	0	0	2010 Brno	0	1	0	1	1	0
2011 Tartu	0	0	0	2011 Vigo	0	0	0	0	0	0
2012 Cartagena	0	0	0	2012 Varna	0	0	0	0	0	0
2013 Lahti	0	1	0	2013 Sofia	0	1	1	0	2	1
2014 Moscow	0	0	0	2014 Moscow	0	1	1	0	1	1
2015 Tórshavn	1	0	0	2015 Tórshavn	0	1	0	1	1	0
2016 Brno	0	1	0	2016 Brno	0	1	1	0	2	1
2017 Helsinki	1	0	1	2017 Helsinki	1	1	0	2	1	1
2018 Budapest	0	1	0	2018 Budapest	0	1	0	0	2	0
2019 Cartagena	0	1	1	2019 Cartagena	1	0	0	1	1	1
2021 Helsinki	1	0	0	2021 Helsinki	0	1	1	1	1	1
2022 Graz	0	1	1	2022 Graz	1	0	1	1	1	2
2024 Tartu	1	0	0	2024 Tartu	1	0	0	2	0	0
2025 Samokov	0	0	1	2025 Samokov	0	1	0	1	1	0

== Multiple medalists ==
=== Senior ===
Team	Gold	Silver	Bronze	Total	Years
Minetit	4	4	1	9	2015–2025
Dynamot	4	0	0	4	2002–2006
Deltat	2	0	0	2	2008–2009
OVO Team	0	1	2	3	2013–2019
Lahjan Tytöt	0	1	1	2	2000–2001

== Results ==
=== Senior ===
Event	Placing	Team	Placing	Team	Details
2000 Helsinki	1st place, gold medalist(s)	Campuksen Koonto	3rd place, bronze medalist(s)	Lahjan Tytöt	
2001 Tallinn	2nd place, silver medalist(s)	Pantterit (Lahjan Tytöt)	3rd place, bronze medalist(s)	Olarin Voimistelijat	
2002 Prague	1st place, gold medalist(s)	Dynamot (Olarin Voimistelijat)	5th	Pantterit (Lahjan Tytöt)	
2003 Graz	1st place, gold medalist(s)	Dynamot (Olarin Voimistelijat)	2nd place, silver medalist(s)	Elektronit (Olarin Voimistelijat)	
2004 Sofia	1st place, gold medalist(s)	Dynamot (Olarin Voimistelijat)	6th	Frida (Vantaan Voimisteluseura)	
2005 Copenhagen	2nd place, silver medalist(s)	Frida (Vantaan Voimisteluseura)	6th	Phantom (Turun Naisvoimistelijat)	
2006 Tampere	1st place, gold medalist(s)	Dynamot (Olarin Voimistelijat)	6th	Frida (Vantaan Voimisteluseura)	
2007 Salou	4th	Deltat (Olarin Voimistelijat)	6th	Frida (Vantaan Voimisteluseura)	
2008 Toronto	1st place, gold medalist(s)	Deltat (Olarin Voimistelijat)	5th	Ampeerit (Olarin Voimistelijat)	
2009 Moscow	1st place, gold medalist(s)	Deltat (Olarin Voimistelijat)	5th	Ampeerit (Olarin Voimistelijat)	
2010 Varna	1st place, gold medalist(s)	Fotonit (Olarin Voimistelijat)	5th	Ampeerit (Olarin Voimistelijat)	
2011 Tartu	4th	OVO Team (Olarin Voimistelijat)	7th	Freyat (Järvenpään Voimistelijat)	
2012 Cartagena	5th	OVO Team (Olarin Voimistelijat)	6th	Minetit (Tampereen Voimistelijat)	
2013 Lahti	2nd place, silver medalist(s)	OVO Team (Olarin Voimistelijat)	6th	Minetit (Tampereen Voimistelijat)	
2014 Moscow	5th	OVO Team (Olarin Voimistelijat)	6th	Sanix (Turun Pyrkivä)	
2015 Tórshavn	1st place, gold medalist(s)	Minetit (Tampereen Voimistelijat)	4th	OVO Team (Olarin Voimistelijat)	
2016 Brno	2nd place, silver medalist(s)	Minetit (Tampereen Voimistelijat)	4th	OVO Team (Olarin Voimistelijat)	
2017 Helsinki	1st place, gold medalist(s)	Minetit (Tampereen Voimistelijat)	3rd place, bronze medalist(s)	OVO Team (Olarin Voimistelijat)	
2018 Budapest	2nd place, silver medalist(s)	Minetit (Tampereen Sisu)	4th	OVO Team (Olarin Voimistelijat)	
2019 Cartagena	2nd place, silver medalist(s)	Minetit (Tampereen Sisu)	3rd place, bronze medalist(s)	OVO Team (Olarin Voimistelijat)	
2021 Helsinki	1st place, gold medalist(s)	Minetit (Tampereen Sisu)	4th	OVO Team (Olarin Voimistelijat)	-
2022 Graz	2nd place, silver medalist(s)	Minetit (SC Vantaa, Tampereen Sisu, TVS Illusion)	3rd place, bronze medalist(s)	Gloria (Elise, Attitude, PNV)	
2024 Tartu	1st place, gold medalist(s)	Minetit (Tampereen Sisu)	4th	OVO Team (Olarin Voimistelijat)	
2025 Samokov	3rd place, bronze medalist(s)	Minetit (Tampereen Sisu)	5th	OVO Team (Olarin Voimistelijat)	
