= Jenna Alavahtola =

Finnish rhythmic gymnast

- Born: 11 May 1994 (age 32) Helsinki, Finland

Gymnastics career
- Discipline: Aesthetic group gymnastics, Rhythmic gymnastics
- Country represented: Finland (2008-2017)
- Club: Olarin Voimistelijat
- Head coach: Anneli Laine-Näätänen
- Choreographer: Anneli Laine-Näätänen
- Retired: yes
Medal record
Aesthetic group gymnastics
Representing Finland
World Championships
Gold medal – first place	2010 Varna	Senior Final
Silver medal – second place	2013 Lahti	Senior Final
Bronze medal – third place	2017 Helsinki	Senior Final
Junior World Championships
Gold medal – first place	2008 Cartagena	Junior Final
World Cup Final
Silver medal – second place	2017 Chicago	Senior Overall

Jenna Alavahtola (born 11 May 1994) is a Finnish rhythmic and aesthetic group gymnast. She is the 2010 World champion and a four-time (2011-2014) Finnish National champion in Aesthetic group gymnastics competing with OVO Team.

== Career ==
=== Junior ===
Jenna was competing for Olarin Voimistelijat since the beginning. She was a member of junior team Fotonit from 2005 to 2009. They took gold medal at the 2008 Finnish Junior Championships in front of Minetit and Mimodes. She is the 2008 Junior World champion.

=== Senior ===
In 2010, she and her teammates from team Fotonit started competing in senior category. They won silver medal at the 2010 Finnish Championships behind Ampeerit from Olarin Voimistelijat. They won gold medal at the 2010 World Championships in Varna, Bulgaria, which was a huge surprise. She was also a part of Finnish national rhythmic gymnastics group that year. They competed at the 2010 World Championships in Moscow, Russia and placed 17th in Group All-around competition.

In 2011, she continued training in both disciplines at the same time. She competed at the 2011 World Rhythmic Gymnastics Championships in Montpellier and took 23rd place in Group All-around competition. Fotonit fell apart, so she and some other girls joined OVO Team. They took fourth place at the 2011 World Championships and won gold medal at the 2011 Finnish Championships.

In 2014, she became a captain of OVO Team and remained on that position until her retirement. Her team placed 5th at the 2014 World Championships in Moscow.

She finished her career in 2017, after winning bronze medal with OVO Team at the 2017 World Championships in her hometown Helsinki and gold medal at World Cup Final in Chicago in November.
