= Olivia Yli-Juuti =

Finnish aesthetic group gymnast

- Full name: Olivia Yli-Juuti
- Born: 24 May 2001 (age 25) Helsinki, Finland

Gymnastics career
- Discipline: Aesthetic group gymnastics
- Country represented: Finland (2015-2021)
- Club: Tampereen Sisu
- Gym: Ikuri Sports hall, Tampere
- Head coaches: Titta Heikkilä, Teija Kukkala
- Former coach: Anneli Laine-Näätänen
- Choreographer: Antton Laine
Medal record
World Championships
Bronze medal – third place	2019 Cartagena	Senior Final
European Championships
Silver medal – second place	2021 Moscow	Senior Final

Olivia Yli-Juuti (born 24 May 2001) is a Finnish aesthetic group gymnast. She is a five-time (2015 - 2019) Finnish National champion in Aesthetic group gymnastics competing with Team Minetit. She is the 2021 European silver and the 2019 World bronze medalist in aesthetic group gymnastics.

== Career ==
She started competing in aesthetic group gymnastics in club Tapanilan Erä with team Alexa. They won gold medals at the 2013 and 2014 Finnish National Championship in category 12-14 years.

In 2015, she joined junior team Elite in cooperation of club Tapanilan Erä and Sport Club Vantaa. She attended her fist Challenge Cup, where they finished 4th in Junior category, only 0,45 points away from podium. They won bronze medal at Finnish National Championship in junior category the same year. Later, they competed at the 2015 Junior World Championships in Tórshavn, Faroe Islands. Team ended on 7th place in Preliminaries and did not advance into the finals due to 2 teams per country rule.

In 2016, they competed at three Challenge Cup events: in Estonia, Bulgaria and Spain. They won bronze medal again at Finnish National Championship in junior category and qualified to the 2016 Junior World Championships in Brno, Czech Republic. The team fall apart in autumn that year, that is why she joined senior team Gloria from club Pakilan Voimistelijat. She made her World Cup debut at the 2017 World Cup II in Padua, Italy. They took 9th place in Qualifications with score of 16.850.

== Personal life ==
Olivia is now living in Tampere and coaching Minetit Pre-junior team from Tampeeren Sisu.
