= Liisa Lepola =

Finnish gymnast

- Full name: Liisa Lepola
- Born: 8 February 1998 (age 28) Helsinki, Finland

Gymnastics career
- Discipline: Aesthetic group gymnastics
- Country represented: Finland
- Club: Tampereen Voimistelijat
- Gym: Ikurin Liikuntahalli
- Head coaches: Titta Heikkilä, Teija Kukkala
- Choreographer: Antton Laine
- Retired: yes
Medal record
Representing Finland
Aesthetic group gymnastics
World Championships
Gold medal – first place	2015 Tórshavn	Senior Final
Silver medal – second place	2016 Brno	Senior Final
Silver medal – second place	2014 Moscow	Junior Final
Silver medal – second place	2013 Sofia	Junior Final
European Championships
Gold medal – first place	2016 Tartu	Senior Final
World Cup Final
Silver medal – second place	2016 Barcelona	Senior Overall
Silver medal – second place	2015 Tampere	Senior Overall

Liisa Lepola (born 8 February 1998) is a Finnish aesthetic group gymnast.

She's a two-time (2015, 2016) Finnish National champion in Aesthetic group gymnastics competing with Team Minetit.
