= 2021 World Aesthetic Gymnastics Championships =

World Aesthetic Gymnastics Championships

- Venue: Helsinki Ice Hall
- Location: Helsinki, Finland
- Start date: 19 November 2021
- End date: 21 November 2021

The 2021 World Aesthetic Group Gymnastics Championships, the 21st edition of the Aesthetic group gymnastics competition, was held in Helsinki, Finland from November 19 to 21, at the Helsinki Ice Hall.

== Participating nations ==
- Austria
- Bulgaria
- Canada
- Czech Republic
- Denmark
- Estonia
- Finland
- France
- Greece
- Italy
- Kazakhstan
- Luxembourg
- Russia
- Spain
- Ukraine

== Medal winners ==
Event	Gold	Silver	Bronze
Senior Final	Minetit Finland Oona Haatanen, Jessica Hakala, Iinu Häkkinen, Laura Kiljunen, Adaliina Niininen, Emmi Nikkilä, Siiri Puuska, Neea Sivill, Meeriellen Sukari	Madonna RGF Alina Bolbat, Alisa Charushina, Marina Chekarova, Aina Farakshina, Yulia Kalinichenko, Anna Kulikova, Sofiia Ostrovskaia, Milena Rastvorova, Alisa Remez, Sofia Shabalina, Alisa Siukkia	Expressia RGF Veronika Iliukhina, Varvara Kasimova, Polina Kostiuchenko, Anastasia Kozhemyakina, Daria Loktionova, Ksenia Pavlenko, Kamilla Rasshchupkina, Angelina Sheichuk, Evgeniia Shokarova, Ekaterina Sveshnikova
Junior Final	Victoria RGF Ekaterina Andreeva, Alena Bandorina, Iuliia Chesnkovoa, Mariia Emelianova, Ariadna Kovalenskaya, Arina Monogenova, Aleksandra Sukaylo, Anastasiia Uskova, Kristina Zilber	Minetit Junior Finland Ella Koskinen, Tilda Holappa, Jenni Hyytiäinen, Katariina Järventausta, Minttu Malinen, Serafiina Niininen, Lilja Peurakoski, Sini Tapio	OVO Junior team Finland Aliisa Alvesalo, Laura Ekman, Emma Jonsson, Ksenia Kameneva, Lisette Kapanen, Kukka Koskenvuo, Ada Koskenvuo, Anna Kulp, Janna Kutila, Saaga Leppävuori, Militza Orava, Erin Rönnholm, Emma Törmänen, Vilja Vuorinen, Ida Widjeskog
Country ranking
Senior Team	RGF; Madonna; Alina Bolbat, Alisa Charushina, Marina Chekarova, Aina Farakshina, Yulia Kalinichenko, Anna Kulikova, Sofiia Ostrovskaia, Milena Rastvorova, Alisa Remez, Sofia Shabalina, Alisa Siukkia; Expressia; Veronika Iliukhina, Varvara Kasimova, Polina Kostiuchenko, Anastasia Kozhemyakina, Daria Loktionova, Ksenia Pavlenko, Kamilla Rasshchupkina, Angelina Sheichuk, Evgeniia Shokarova, Ekaterina Sveshnikova; Nebesa; Lada Derbeneva, Sofiia Dolzhenko, Anna Evseenko, Anastasiia Ivanova, Sofya Krushanova, Elizaveta Lavrik, Alisa Rubailo, Emilia Skliarova, Elizaveta Temnikova, Elvira Vladimerets	Finland; Minetit; Oona Haatanen, Jessica Hakala, Iinu Häkkinen, Laura Kiljunen, Adaliina Niininen, Emmi Nikkilä, Siiri Puuska, Neea Sivill, Meeriellen Sukari; OVO Team; Aino Handelberg, Angelica Kangas, Aurora Kapanen, Karla Kuuskoski, Greta Hagberg, Andrea Edman, Ulla Helin, Tytti Ilvessalo, Olivia Jensen, Olivia Soini, Emilia Kähkönen, Helmi Härkönen; Gloria; Laura Airila, Josefina Ketola, Anna Luoto, Noora Luoto, Hertta Martikainen, Tuuli Mörsky, Tiara Reyes, Justiina Tiittanen, Varvara Yulle	Bulgaria; National team Victoria Berova, Miriana Cholakova, Sibila Karpacheva, Hristiana Kovacheva, Mihaela Lilkina, Karina Neykova, Dobromira Stavreva, Siana Tabakova; Impala team Preslava Doncheva, Asya Ivanova, Yanitsa Ivanova, Figen Mehmed, Kamelia Oslieva, Viktoria Peneva, Anastasia Stankova; Etar Elit; Hristiyana Deneva, Yoana Doncheva, Mihaela Dyulgerova, Denislava Georgieva, Denislava Nacheva, Desislava Panchova, Gabriela Trendafilova
Junior Team	Finland; Minetit Junior; Ella Koskinen, Tilda Holappa, Jenni Hyytiäinen, Katariina Järventausta, Minttu Malinen, Serafiina Niininen, Lilja Peurakoski, Sini Tapio; OVO Junior team Aliisa Alvesalo, Laura Ekman, Emma Jonsson, Ksenia Kameneva, Lisette Kapanen, Kukka Koskenvuo, Ada Koskenvuo, Anna Kulp, Janna Kutila, Saaga Leppävuori, Militza Orava, Erin Rönnholm, Emma Törmänen, Vilja Vuorinen, Ida Widjeskog; Sanix Valens Junior; Sofia Holmqvist, Emma-Lina Laaksonen, Nelli Lajunen, Sofia Mustaniemi, Ranja Niemelä, Veronika Palanen, Emilia Rauhala, Roosa Riionheimo, Stella Savisalo, Aada Sinkkonen, Emilia Vigren	RGF; Victoria; Ekaterina Andreeva, Alena Bandorina, Iuliia Chesnkovoa, Mariia Emelianova, Ariadna Kovalenskaya, Arina Monogenova, Aleksandra Sukaylo, Anastasiia Uskova, Kristina Zilber; Madonna Junior; Mariia-Aneta Alvares, Makhina Malvina Dadadzhanova, Violetta Gareeva, Victoria Ilchenko, Anna Kirichenko, Ekaterina Liashkevich, Maria Shekhovtsova, Anastasia Sibichenkova; Oscar; Margarita Chuvashova, Albina Gerasimenko, Vitalina Khorina, Nadezhda Khramova, Anastasiia Kuznetsova, Valeriia Shapalova, Daria Smirnova, Alisa Zakharova	Estonia; Siidisabad; Karoli Metsma, Michelle Sild Terit, Liina Sarv, Riin Parts, Kärt Rentel, Karolina Kuusik, Triin-Elis Kuum, Hanna Mägi, Maria Terep, Liisbet Sorge, Emily Hermann, Elis Sarapuu, Karina Saealle; Violett; Hettel Haava, Karina Krit, Kaisa Laas, Kertu Lass, Grete Magerramov, Mirtel Marjapuu, Mia Natalie Sikk, Annabel Toom; Piruett Junior Team; Mia Marleen Kaart, Mia Helena Madisson, Iris Naan, Rebeka Ojaveski, Pärli Karmela Parras, Adriana Raud, Mari Rumm, Käti Saar, Laura Sooman

== Results ==
=== Senior ===
The top 12 teams (2 per country) and the host country in Preliminaries qualify to the Finals.

Place	Nation	Name	Preliminaries	Final	Total
1st place, gold medalist(s)	Finland	Minetit	19.200 (1)	19.550 (1)	38.750
2nd place, silver medalist(s)	RGF	Madonna	19.100 (2)	19.400 (2)	38.500
3rd place, bronze medalist(s)	RGF	Expressia	19.000 (3)	19.350 (3)	38.350
4	Finland	OVO Team	19.000 (3)	19.050 (5)	38.050
5	Bulgaria	National team	18.800 (5)	19.200 (4)	38.000
6	Estonia	Team Grisete	17.700 (8)	18.100 (6)	38.050
7	Spain	ALCON Ciutat de Barcelona	17.550 (10)	17.500 (7)	35.050
8	Ukraine	Alcor Avangard	16.950 (11)	16.550 (9)	33.500
8	Bulgaria	Impala team	16.800 (12)	16.700 (8)	33.500
10	Spain	Ritmica Barcelona	15.900 (15)	16.350 (10)	32.250
11	Estonia	Piruett Senior Team	16.000 (13)	16.150 (12)	32.150
12	Czech Republic	Zonja	15.800 (16)	16.100 (13)	31.900
13	Kazakhstan	Kerbez	15.650 (17)	16.250 (11)	31.900
14	Canada	Rhythmic Expression	14.700 (21)	14.900 (14)	29.600
15	RGF	Nebesa	18.500 (6)		18.500
16	Finland	Gloria	18.100 (7)		18.100
17	Finland	Sanix Valens	17.650 (9)		17.650
18	Bulgaria	Etar Elit	16.000 (13)		16.000
19	Czech Republic	Prague AGG Team	15.550 (18)		15.550
19	Spain	Ritmica Cartagena	15.550 (18)		15.550
21	Czech Republic	SK Trasko Vyškov Otto	15.450 (20)		15.450
22	Estonia	Caresse	14.650 (22)		14.650
23	Austria	Tanzfabrik	14.650 (22)		14.650
24	Denmark	Team Octavia	14.550 (24)		14.550
25	Denmark	Team Greve	14.400 (25)		14.400
26	Denmark	Team Aura	14.350 (26)		14.350
27	France	Team Snow	12.150 (27)		12.150
28	Italy	Ginnastica Provercelli 1892	12.000 (28)		12.000
29	France	Team Alizea	11.050 (29)		11.050

== Medal table ==
Rank	Nation	Gold	Silver	Bronze	Total
1	Finland (FIN)	2	2	1	5
1	RGF	2	2	1	5
3	Bulgaria (BUL)	0	0	1	1
3	Estonia (EST)	0	0	1	1
Totals (4 entries)		4	4	4	12
