= 2023 World Aesthetic Group Gymnastics Championships =

World Aesthetic Group Gymnastics Championships

2023 World Aesthetic Gymnastics Championships
- Venue: Baluan Sholak Sports Palace
- Location: Almaty, Kazakhstan
- Start date: 24 November 2023
- End date: 26 November 2023

The 2023 World Aesthetic Group Gymnastics Championships, the 23rd edition of the Aesthetic group gymnastics competition, was held in Almaty, Kazakhstan from November 24 to 26, at the Baluan Sholak Sports Palace.

Several countries, including Denmark, Estonia, Finland and the Faroe Islands, did not participate in the championships in protest against the participation of Russian and Belarusian teams.

== Participating countries ==
- Austria
- Bulgaria
- Canada
- Egypt
- France
- Greece
- Israel
- Italy
- Japan
- Kazakhstan
- Kyrgyzstan
- Spain
- Serbia
- Malaysia

== Schedule ==
- Wednesday, November 22
  - All Day: Arrival of delegations
  - Evening; Official trainings
- Thursday, November 23
  - All Day: Preliminaries for Four Continents Cup
  - Evening; Welcome meeting
- Friday, November 24
  - All Day: Finals for Four Continents Cup
  - Evening; Official trainings
- Saturday, November 25
  - 12:30 - 14:10 Preliminaries IFAGG Trophy
  - 14:40 - 16:00 Preliminaries Junior
  - 16:15 - 17:55 Preliminaries Senior
- Sunday, August 27
  - 12:00 - 13:25 Finals IFAGG Trophy
  - 14:00 - 15:05 Finals Junior
  - 15:20 - 16:40 Finals Senior
  - 16:45 - 17:45 Gala performance
  - Awarding Ceremony

== Medal winners ==
Event	Gold	Silver	Bronze
Senior Final	Expressia RGF Anastasia Potapova, Angelina Sheichuk, Daria Loktionova, Vasilisa Gavrilova, Kamilla Rasshchupkina, Arina Ivanova, Polina Kostiuchenko, Amina Shigapova, Violetta Gareeva, Kseniia Klimenko	The National Team Bulgaria Karina Neykova, Hristiana Kovacheva, Victoria Berova, Yana Staykova, Maria Mehlemova, Sibila Karpacheva, Daria Kapsazova, Siana Tabakova	National Team Bulgaria Maria Stamenova, Kristiana Doycheva, Nikol Zlatkova, Nikol Angelova, Raya Srandeva, Katrin Taseva, Daria Voynova, Anjelika Kazakova Madonna RGF Milena Rastvorova, Yulia Kalinichenko, Aina Farakshina, Alisa Remez, Alisa Siukkia, Angelina Shnaider, Sofiia Karavanova, Ekaterina Davydova, Vitalina Khorina
Junior Final	Victoria RGF Alena Bandorina, Vasilina Vasina, Viktoriia Dykina, Alina Konstantinova, Arina Monogenova, Renata Rusakova, Olesia Stepanova, Olga Tekina	Madonna Junior RGF Polina Bogatyreva, Ruslana Brusanova, Angelina Kalaidzhian, Valeriia Troiniakova, Kseniia Khrapunkova, Polina Petrova, Maria Volodina, Arina Anisimova, Elizaveta Goncharova, Anastasiia Ovechkina	National Team Bulgaria Linoy Georgieva, Andrea Hristova, Andrea Sarafova, Jaklin Naydenova, Daria Nacheva, Dalia Ivanova, Adriana Mohailova, Vladina Grosheva Samruk Kazakhstan Adina Issabekova, Mikaella Oshaganova, Akbota Tokanova, Inkar Baironova, Aizara Abildinova, Dana Tursynkanova, Aruzhan Shamshina, Madina Bulatova, Anar Mukhamedgaliyeva, Medina Abdibayeva
Country ranking
Senior Team	RGF; Expressia; Anastasia Potapova, Angelina Sheichuk, Daria Loktionova, Vasilisa Gavrilova, Kamilla Rasshchupkina, Arina Ivanova, Polina Kostiuchenko, Amina Shigapova, Violetta Gareeva, Kseniia Klimenko; Madonna; Milena Rastvorova, Yulia Kalinichenko, Aina Farakshina, Alisa Remez, Alisa Siukkia, Angelina Shnaider, Sofiia Karavanova, Ekaterina Davydova, Vitalina Khorina; Amuazh; Polina Bulgacheva, Anastasiia Deryabina, Adelia Oztiurk, Valeria Suleymanova, Ariadna Tutukova, Anastasiia Yaroslavtseva, Polina Yaroslavtseva, Polina Nesterova, Daria Saraeva, Ekaterina Shugol	Bulgaria; The National team Karina Neykova, Hristiana Kovacheva, Victoria Berova, Yana Staykova, Maria Mehlemova, Sibila Karpacheva, Daria Kapsazova, Siana Tabakova; National team Maria Stamenova, Kristiana Doycheva, Nikol Zlatkova, Nikol Angelova, Raya Srandeva, Katrin Taseva, Daria Voynova, Anjelika Kazakova; Velbajd; Elizabet Shopova, Tsvetozara Milenkova, Nilana Kolevska, Vasilena Dimitrova, Tsvetomira Todorova, Beloslava Kenova, Tihomira Boneva	Kazakhstan; Freedom; Amina Beiganova, Tomiris Bolat, Zere Kabash, Ailin Maxutova, Adeliya Tursynkozha, Azhar Ryspek, Anastassiya Chukreyeva; Sunrise; Altynay Nurkenkyzy, Anel Nursultan, Kamila Rakhimzhanova, Amilya Kunanbayeva, Zere Assylbek, Lada Yassakova, Sabina Kikimova; Karmelites; Yelizaveta Sharaya, Saida Patshakhan, Sabina Yelyubayeva, Sagdana Paizkhanova, Aida Zhaksybek, Saniya Turdybay, Elriza Mussa, Nikol Shaibakova
Junior Team	RGF; Victoria; Alena Bandorina, Vasilina Vasina, Viktoriia Dykina, Alina Konstantinova, Arina Monogenova, Renata Rusakova, Olesia Stepanova, Olga Tekina; Madonna Junior; Polina Bogatyreva, Ruslana Brusanova, Angelina Kalaidzhian, Valeriia Troiniakova, Kseniia Khrapunkova, Polina Petrova, Maria Volodina, Arina Anisimova, Elizaveta Goncharova, Anastasiia Ovechkina; Victoria Strela; Arina Rusakova, Maria Kobizkaya, Olesia Nikitina, Sophia Osina, Elizaveta Antonova, Ulyana Kadyrova, Daria Titioi, Aleksandra Tereshkina, Olga Sitnikova	Kazakhstan; Samruk; Adina Issabekova, Mikaella Oshaganova, Akbota Tokanova, Inkar Baironova, Aizara Abildinova, Dana Tursynkanova, Aruzhan Shamshina, Madina Bulatova, Anar Mukhamedgaliyeva, Medina Abdibayeva; Kerbez Elite; Amina Mukanova, Anastassiya Grents, Malika Sultanova, Ayaulym Assylbek, Assem Shaimukhanbet, Diana Uassiyeva, Assiya Atabayeva, Alima Akhmetzhanova, Aiim Dyussembayeva, Aimeken Duisen; Alan Junior; Aisha Mukhitbekova, Rauana Albekova, Darina Nakyp, Varvara Kondratenko, Islana Ruslankyzy, Adina Orynbay, Liliya Yun, Sofya Yun, Tomiris Bolatbek, Angelina Verendeyeva	Kyrgyzstan; Fenix; Germiona Muratova, Daria Vyshemirskaia, Nika Osokina, Sofia Sleptsova, Eliza Dokturbekova, Kanykei Dooronbaeva, Rusalina Russkikh, Sofia Mishchenko; Elegance; Svetlana Vorobeva, Veronika Vetrishchak, Zhibek Raiymbekova, Adile Asanova, Begimai Azatova, Medina Ermekova, Begaiym Kushbakalieva, Amal Turgunbekova

== Medal table ==
Rank	Nation	Gold	Silver	Bronze	Total
1	RGF	4	1	1	6
2	Bulgaria (BUL)	0	2	2	4
3	Kazakhstan (KAZ)	0	1	2	3
4	Kyrgyzstan (KGZ)	0	0	1	1
Totals (4 entries)		4	4	6	14
