= 2025 World Aesthetic Group Gymnastics Championships =

World Aesthetic Group Gymnastics Championships

2025 World Aesthetic Gymnastics Championships
- Venue: SamElyon sport and event centre
- Location: Samokov, Bulgaria
- Start date: 28 November 2025
- End date: 30 November 2025

The 2025 World Aesthetic Group Gymnastics Championships, the 25th edition of the Aesthetic group gymnastics competition, was held in Samokov, Bulgaria from November 28 to 30, at the SamElyon sport and event centre.

The competition featured participants from 23 countries around the world, which is the most since the record year 2019 in Cartagena. Teams from Russia and Belarus competed under a neutral flag of IFAGG.

== Participating countries ==
- Andorra
- Austria
- Belgium
- Bulgaria
- Cyprus
- Czech Republic
- Denmark
- Estonia
- Finland
- France
- Greece
- Hungary
- Italy
- Japan
- Kazakhstan
- Kyrgyzstan
- Luxembourg
- Malaysia
- Moldova
- Spain
- Serbia
- United States
- Ukraine

== Schedule ==
- Saturday, November 29
  - 10:45 - 12:55 Preliminaries Junior Group A
  - 13:10 - 15:20 Preliminaries Junior Group B
  - 15:30 - 16:20 Opening Ceremony
  - 16:20 - 18:30 Preliminaries Senior Group A
  - 18:45 - 21:10 Preliminaries Senior Group B
- Sunday, November 30
  - 10:45 - 12:00 Finals Junior
  - 12:40 - 14:00 Finals Senior
  - 14:20 - 15:00 Gala performance
  - 15:00 Awarding Ceremony

== Medal winners ==
Event	Gold	Silver	Bronze
Senior Final	The National Team Bulgaria Karina Neykova, Siyana Tabakova, Victoria Berova, Hristiana Kovacheva, Yana Staykova, Maria Mehlemova, Katrin Taseva	Madonna IFAGG Ekaterina Davydova, Anastasiia Kuznetsova, Vitalia Malysheva, Alisa Remez, Anastasia Zolina, Mariia Zauer, Vitalina Khorina, Anastasia Iakimovich, Angelina Shnaider, Viktoriia Ilchenko	Minetit Finland Alisa Gorjunov, Jenni Hyytiäinen, Iinu Häkkinen, Katariina Järventausta, Ella Koskinen, Minttu Malinen, Minttu Mikkola, Serafiina Niininen, Saimi Sepponen, Sini Tapio Expressia IFAGG Arina Ivanova, Vasilisa Gavrilova, Polina Kostiuchenko, Daria Loktionova, Angelina Sheichuk, Kamilla Rasschupkina, Anastasia Potapova, Polina Evteeva, Amina Shigapova
Junior Final	Madonna Junior IFAGG Anastasiia Alekseeva, Ruslana Brusanova, Angelina Kalaidzhian, Maria Mitroshina, Kseniia Khrapunkova, Polina Petrova, Maria Volodina, Valeriia Troiniakova, Sofia Pletneva	Minetit Junior Finland Mila Hagman, Maija Kataja, Alissa Mäkirinta, Pihla Pakarinen, Vilja Pykäläinen, Elle Sovelius, Aurora Veneskoski, Stella Veneskoski	National Team Bulgaria Linoy Georgieva, Andrea Hristova, Andrea Sarafova, Nikol Zlatkova, Dalia Ivanova, Jaklin Naydenova, Daria Nacheva, Adriana Mihaylova
Country ranking
Senior Team	Finland; Minetit; Alisa Gorjunov, Jenni Hyytiäinen, Iinu Häkkinen, Katariina Järventausta, Ella Koskinen, Minttu Malinen, Minttu Mikkola, Serafiina Niininen, Saimi Sepponen, Sini Tapio; OVO Team; Enni Hämäläinen, Janna Kutila, Selma Länsmans, Melina Marila, Oona Räätäri, Sanni Salminen, Laura Seppä, Yagmur Serengil, Alida Virkkunen; Sirius; Amanda Vesala, Alisa Kunelius, Eevi Kilpikoski, Elina Teittinen, Emilia Leppänen, Emilla Arkko, Kreettaliisa Harju, Lia Borbely, Maria Kääriäinen, Hilla-Maija Harju, Ilona Pöyhönen, Susa Lahtinen, Venla Nenonen	Bulgaria; The National Team; Karina Neykova, Siyana Tabakova, Victoria Berova, Hristiana Kovacheva, Yana Staykova, Maria Mehlemova, Katrin Taseva; Academic; Nikol Stoyanova, Nikol Yakimova, Mihaela Antova, Nikol Antova, Mariela Stoimenova, Tsvetelina Stoimenova, Karina Dimitrova, Viktoria Nikolaeva; Velbajd; Karina Burnazka, Vasilena Dimitrova, Svetoslava Georgieva, Gergana Haralampieva, Violina Mazneva, Magdalena Velinova	Estonia; Rebasesabad; Augustiine Tamme, Liina Sarv, Karina Saealle, Saskia Treufeldt, Kristelle Laanejõe, Triinu Õun, Sandra Kutkin, Mia Kutkin, Anni Kiili, Mona Maasikas; Esperanza; Anastasija Lukasina, Viktoria Udalova, Mirjam Linnamägi, Polina Karolina Volegzanina, Maria Mjagkova, Kirke Konks, Iris Oidsalu, Maria Butuzova, Sienna Vesper; Melissa; Karolin Mesikäpp, Annabel Steinberg, Elisabeth Mii Arbeiter, Karmen Balõnski, Maria Brigitta Linno, Nora Maria Keinast, Rianna Sikk, Gloria Kuum
Junior Team	Finland; Minetit Junior; Mila Hagman, Maija Kataja, Alissa Mäkirinta, Pihla Pakarinen, Vilja Pykäläinen, Elle Sovelius, Aurora Veneskoski, Stella Veneskoski; OVO Junior Team; Ida Anttilainen, Julia Haga, Pihla Karhunen, Elle Klemetti, Filippa Luotonen, Neela Mollberg, Venla Nurmiainen, Julia Paasikivi, Veera Pohjavuori, Enni Tikkala; Team Freyat; Olga Ahonen, Iita Hovi, Hilla Hapuoja, Minttu Uusitalo, Elsa Kuiri, Aili Ojala, Mianna Rope, Elli Karvonen, Ella Busi, Iina Koskenranta	Bulgaria; National Team; Linoy Georgieva, Andrea Hristova, Andrea Sarafova, Nikol Zlatkova, Dalia Ivanova, Jaklin Naydenova, Daria Nacheva, Adriana Mihaylova; Team Academic juniors Raya Ivanova, Siana Filipova, Victoria Nencheva, Mihaela Pashova, Mihaela Sotirova, Beloslava Karayaneva, Evdokia Dimitrova, Beloslava Dimcheva, Vanessa Pandova; Team Etar elit Carmen Stefanova, Lora Lazarova, Nikol Koleva, Mia Zhelyazkova, Ivayla Yosifova, Nicole Koleva	Estonia; Rebasesabad Junior; Elisabeth Reinthal, Blanka Treufeldt, Erin Lemendik, Jana Lanevski, Loviisa Paas, Aleksandra Maria Tuvi, Keit Ree Viira, Mari-Liis Kallari, Maris Sarapuu, Rebeka Hõbejärv, Rianna Laht; Minella; Maribel Nääs, Mirt Annus, Elisabeth Massakas, Grete Audova, Joanna Marie Trolla, Nora Sofia Raam, Elli Korol, Matilda Pastak, Iris Sulg; Piruett Junior Team; Anni Vili, Helena Ehandi, Elisabet Sikk, Simona Elvak, Loore Mikser, Lia Porošina, Miroslava Kolomijec

== Results ==
The top 12 teams (2 per country) and the host country in Preliminaries qualify to the Finals. USA took a place in the final because each continent has to be represented and they were next highest ranked in Qualification.

=== Senior ===
Place	Nation	Name	Preliminaries	Final	Total
1st place, gold medalist(s)	Bulgaria	The National Team	29.250 (1)	29.450 (1)	58.700
2nd place, silver medalist(s)	IFAGG	Madonna	28.500 (2)	28.300 (4)	56.800
3rd place, bronze medalist(s)	Finland	Minetit	28.300 (3)	28.350 (2)	56.650
3rd place, bronze medalist(s)	IFAGG	Expressia	28.300 (3)	28.350 (2)	56.650
5	Finland	OVO Team	27.750 (5)	27.400 (6)	55.150
6	Estonia	Rebasesabad	27.400 (6)	27.500 (5)	54.900
7	Bulgaria	Academic	26.650 (11)	26.200 (7)	52.850
7	Japan	JWCPE AGG Team	26.700 (10)	26.150 (8)	52.850
9	Czech Republic	Prague AGG Team Thunder	25.000 (14)	25.300 (9)	50.300
10	IFAGG	Silfida	25.600 (12)	24.550 (11)	50.150
11	Czech Republic	SK MG Mantila Brno Smilles	24.950 (15)	25.150 (10)	50.100
12	Japan	TWCPE Amin	25.150 (13)	24.350 (12)	49.500
13	USA	National Team 1 – Elara	24.850 (16)	23.650 (13)	48.500
14	Finland	Sirius	27.000 (7)	-	27.000
14	Finland	Gloria	27.000 (7)	-	27.000
16	IFAGG	Vdokhnovenie	26.750 (9)	-	26.750
17	Kazakhstan	ALAN	24.500 (17)	-	24.500
18	Estonia	Esperanza	23.750 (18)	-	23.750
19	Estonia	Melissa	23.500 (19)	-	23.500
20	Spain	Ximnasia Oleiros	23.250 (20)	-	23.250
21	Ukraine	Aelita Team	22.850 (21)	-	22.850
22	Austria	Prestige	22.750 (22)	-	22.750
23	Kazakhstan	ESTEL	22.550 (23)	-	22.550
23	France	Esperanza Team Elite	22.550 (23)	-	22.550
25	Kazakhstan	Asyl Tas	22.050 (25)	-	22.050
26	Spain	GR Chinchilla	21.750 (26)	-	21.750
27	Italy	Pro Recco Gym	21.350 (27)	-	21.350
28	Italy	Ardor	21.250 (28)	-	21.250
29	Ukraine	Avangard	21.050 (29)	-	21.050
30	Bulgaria	Velbajd	20.900 (30)	-	20.900
31	USA	National Team 2 – Sakura	20.850 (31)	-	20.850
32	Belgium	Hope Stars	20.700 (32)	-	20.700
33	Austria	Tanzfabrik	20.400 (33)	-	20.400
34	Malaysia	Team Malaysia	19.950 (34)	-	19.950
35	Hungary	Queens	19.900 (35)	-	19.900
36	France	Estello	18.550 (36)	-	18.550
37	Andorra	GAEE Andorra	18.350 (37)	-	18.350
38	France	Diamant	18.300 (38)	-	18.300

=== Junior ===
Place	Nation	Name	Preliminaries	Final	Total
1st place, gold medalist(s)	IFAGG	Madonna Junior	28.150 (1)	28.150 (1)	56.300
2nd place, silver medalist(s)	Finland	Minetit Junior	27.800 (2)	27.750 (2)	55.550
3rd place, bronze medalist(s)	Bulgaria	National Team	27.500 (3)	27.150 (3)	54.650
4	IFAGG	Victoria Strela	26.750 (6)	26.700 (4)	53.450
4	Finland	OVO Junior Team	27.000 (4)	26.450 (5)	53.450
6	Estonia	Rebasesabad Junior	26.700 (7)	26.400 (6)	53.100
7	Bulgaria	Team Academic juniors	26.800 (5)	25.950 (7)	52.750
8	Japan	Team Japan Junior	25.650 (9)	24.950 (8)	50.600
9	Kazakhstan	KERBEZ	24.450 (14)	24.700 (9)	49.150
10	Estonia	Minella	24.600 (12)	24.400 (10)	49.000
11	IFAGG	Silfida-Roxy	25.150 (11)	23.650 (12)	48.800
12	IFAGG	Silfida-Simphoniya	24.550 (13)	24.100 (11)	48.650
13	USA	National Team 1 – Vitry Juniors	23.500 (19)	22.400 (13)	45.900
14	IFAGG	Oscar	26.000 (8)	-	26.000
15	Finland	Team Freyat	25.500 (10)	-	25.500
16	Kazakhstan	LIEL	24.300 (15)	-	24.300
17	Moldova	Gloria Junior	24.100 (16)	-	24.100
18	Luxembourg	Rythmo-Cats	23.750 (17)	-	23.750
18	IFAGG	Silfida-Crystals	23.750 (17)	-	23.750
20	Denmark	Team Vivanit	23.250 (20)	-	23.250
21	Estonia	Piruett Junior Team	23.150 (21)	-	23.150
22	Kazakhstan	ALAN-JUNIOR	23.050 (22)	-	23.050
23	Bulgaria	Team Etar Elit	22.450 (23)	-	22.450
24	USA	National Team 2 – Elara Juniors	22.250 (24)	-	22.250
25	Czech Republic	Team Flare	22.200 (25)	-	22.200
26	Spain	RITMICA CARTAGENA	21.350 (26)	-	21.350
26	Denmark	Team Violet	21.350 (26)	-	21.350
28	Czech Republic	MANTILA Junior	21.300 (28)	-	21.300
29	Greece	Mykonos Junior	21.050 (29)	-	21.050
30	Kyrgyzstan	National Junior team Elegance	20.700 (30)	-	20.700
31	USA	National Team 3 – Carina Etoile	20.400 (31)	-	20.400
32	France	MASSILIA	19.750 (32)	-	19.750
33	Cyprus	SELLACCO	19.600 (33)	-	19.600
34	Malaysia	Malaysia Junior Team	19.550 (34)	-	19.550
35	Serbia	Junior team Serbia	19.450 (35)	-	19.450
36	Bulgaria	Team Afrodita	18.750 (36)	-	18.750
37	Greece	FREE SOUL	18.350 (37)	-	18.350
38	Greece	Elaia Gymnastics Club	18.250 (38)	-	18.250
39	France	CALIGNA	15.200 (39)	-	15.200

== Medal table ==
* Host nation (Bulgaria)

Rank	Nation	Gold	Silver	Bronze	Total
1	Finland (FIN)	2	1	1	4
2	Bulgaria (BUL)*	1	2	1	4
3	RGF	1	1	1	3
4	Estonia (EST)	0	0	2	2
Totals (4 entries)		4	4	5	13
