= 2009 World Aesthetic Group Gymnastics Championships =

International gymnastics competition

- Venue: Druzhba Multipurpose Arena
- Location: Moscow, Russia
- Start date: 04 June 2009
- End date: 6 June 2009

The 2009 World Aesthetic Gymnastics Championships, the 10th edition of the Aesthetic group gymnastics competition, was held in Moscow, Russia from June 04 to 06, at the Druzhba Multipurpose Arena.

== Participating nations ==
- Austria
- Belarus
- Bulgaria
- Canada
- Czech Republic
- Denmark
- Estonia
- Finland
- Russia
- South Africa
- Spain
- Ukraine

== Medal winners ==
Event	Gold	Silver	Bronze
Senior Final	Deltat Finland Venla Haverinen, Ida Henritius, Elina Ikonen, Anni Lehtonen, Eeva-Leena Niemelä, Outi Saari, Iida Taari, Mila Tanttu, Johanna Vikkula	Oscar Russia	Madonna Russia

== Results ==
Place	Nation	Name	Preliminaries	Final	Total
1st place, gold medalist(s)	Finland	Deltat/OVO	18.350 (1)	18.750 (1)	37.100
2nd place, silver medalist(s)	Russia	Oscar	18.150 (2)	18.450 (2)	36.600
3rd place, bronze medalist(s)	Russia	Madonna	17.550 (3)	17.550 (3)	35.100
4	Bulgaria	National Team	17.450 (4)	17.400 (4)	34.850
5	Finland	Ampeerit/OVO	17.400 (5)	17.300 (5)	34.700
6	Austria	Tanzfabrik/ATG	16.150 (7)	16.400 (6)	32.550
7	Ukraine	Alcor	15.700 (10)	16.250 (7)	31.950
8	Estonia	Janika Tallinn	16.000 (9)	15.950 (8)	31.950
9	Spain	INEF Barcelona	15.600 (12)	15.850 (9)	31.450
10	Canada	Kalev's Rhythmic	15.650 (11)	15.500 (10)	31.150
11	Finland	Tiklit/VVS	16.150 (6)		16.150
12	Russia	Nebesa	16.050 (8)		16.050
13	Bulgaria	Akademik	15.550 (13)		15.550
14	Russia	Expressia	15.050 (14)		15.050
15	Estonia	Rytmika	14.850 (15)		14.850
16	Czech Republic	Sokol Velky Tynec	14.450 (16)		14.450
17	Estonia	Piruett	14.250 (17)		14.250
18	Spain	Maniotas	14.100 (18)		14.100
19	Belarus	AGG Team/Belarus	13.550 (19)		13.550
20	Spain	Alcon Cusi	13.150 (20)		13.150
21	Czech Republic	Sokol Praha VII	11.950 (21)		11.950
22	Czech Republic	Mantila Brno	11.200 (22)		11.200
23	Canada	Kalev's Rhythmic	10.750 (23)		10.750
24	Denmark	Greve	10.500 (24)		10.500
25	Denmark	Freya	10.100 (25)		10.100
26	South Africa	AGG Team/Republic of South Africa	8.300 (26)		8.300
