= 2026 World Aesthetic Group Gymnastics Championships =

World Aesthetic Group Gymnastics Championships

2026 World Aesthetic Gymnastics Championships
- Venue: Ohama Daishin Arena
- Location: Sakai, Osaka, Japan
- Start date: 25 November 2026
- End date: 27 November 2026

The 2026 World Aesthetic Group Gymnastics Championships, the 26th edition of the Aesthetic group gymnastics competition, will be held in Sakai, Osaka, Japan from November 25 to 27, at the Ohama Daishin Arena.

Japan is hosting the competition for the first time. The competition will feature participants from 21 countries around the world. Teams from Russia and Belarus are competing under their own flag again after 2021.

== Participating countries ==
- Belarus
- Bulgaria
- Canada
- China
- Czech Republic
- Denmark
- Estonia
- Finland
- France
- Faroe Islands
- Greece
- Israel
- Japan
- Kazakhstan
- Luxembourg
- Malaysia
- Russia
- Singapore
- Spain
- United States
- Ukraine

== Medal table ==
* Host nation (Japan)

Rank	Nation	Gold	Silver	Bronze	Total
Totals (0 entries)		0	0	0	0
