= 2024 World Aesthetic Group Gymnastics Championships =

World Aesthetic Group Gymnastics Championships

2024 World Aesthetic Gymnastics Championships
- Venue: University of Tartu Sports Hall
- Location: Tartu, Estonia
- Start date: 22 November 2024
- End date: 24 November 2024

The 2024 World Aesthetic Group Gymnastics Championships, the 24th edition of the Aesthetic group gymnastics competition, was held in Tartu, Estonia from November 22 to 24, at the University of Tartu Sports Hall.

The competition featured participants from 19 countries around the world. Unlike the previous edition, the 2024 championships took place without the participation of Russian and Belarusian teams, which had been excluded from the competition by IFAGG.

== Participating countries ==
- Andorra
- Bulgaria
- Cyprus
- Czech Republic
- Denmark
- Estonia
- Finland
- France
- Greece
- Japan
- Kazakhstan
- Kyrgyzstan
- Luxembourg
- Malaysia
- Moldova
- Spain
- Serbia
- United States
- Ukraine

== Schedule ==
- Saturday, November 23
  - 11:40 - 12::00 Opening Ceremony
  - 12:00 - 15:30 Preliminaries Junior
  - 16:00 - 19:00 Preliminaries Senior
- Sunday, November 24
  - 12:00 - 13:10 Finals Junior
  - 13:30 - 14:40 Finals Senior
  - 15:00 - 16:00 Gala performance
  - 16:00 - 17:00 Awarding Ceremony

== Medal winners ==
Event	Gold	Silver	Bronze
Senior Final	Minetit Finland Alisa Gorjunov, Sanni Hartman, Jenni Hyytiäinen, Iinu Häkkinen, Katariina Järventausta, Minttu Malinen, Saimi Sepponen, Sini Tapio	National Team Bulgaria Karina Neykova, Siana Tabakova, Yana Staykova, Maria Mehlemova, Hristiana Kovacheva, Sibila Karpacheva, Victoria Berova, Katrin Taseva	Siidisabad Estonia Mona Maasikas, Saskia Treufeld, Karolina Kuusik, Liisbet Sorge, Liina Sarv, Annabel Juuriste, Hanna Mägi, Elis Sarapuu, Maria Terep, Emily Hermann, Karina Saealle
Junior Final	Minetit Junior Finland Mila Hagman, Ella Koskinen, Minttu Mikkola, Siiri Muilu, Serafiina Niininen, Lilja Peurakoski, Elle Sovelius, Stella Veneskoski, Nea Vuoristo	Rebasesabad Estonia Elisabeth Reinthal, Maris Sarapuu, Loviisa Paas, Jana Lanevski, Laara Jakovlev, Birgit Pärn, Triinu Õun, Blanka Treufeldt, Kristelle Laanejõe, Valeria Valasevits	National Team Bulgaria Linoy Georgieva, Jaklin Naydenova, Andrea Sarafova, Andrea Hristova, Daliya Ivanova, Adriana Mihaylova, Daria Nacheva in Nikol Zlatkova
Country ranking
Senior Team	Finland; Minetit; Alisa Gorjunov, Sanni Hartman, Jenni Hyytiäinen, Iinu Häkkinen, Katariina Järventausta, Minttu Malinen, Saimi Sepponen, Sini Tapio; OVO Team; Aliisa Alvesalo, Aino Hyppönen, Ksenia Kameneva, Janna Kutila, Selma Länsmans, Oona Räätäri, Sanni Salminen, Yagmur Serengil, Alida Virkkunen; Gloria; Justiina Tiittanen, Tiara Reyes, Elma Kaasalainen, Henni Hölttä, Nora Kuusisto, Varvara Yulle, Julia Lehtonen, Jenni Säynäjoki, Lilli Säynäjoki, Mikaela Nevalainen, Anni Tuomela	Estonia; Siidisabad; Mona Maasikas, Saskia Treufeld, Karolina Kuusik, Liisbet Sorge, Liina Sarv, Annabel Juuriste, Hanna Mägi, Elis Sarapuu, Maria Terep, Emily Hermann, Karina Saealle; Violett; Kertu Lass, Hettel Haava, Annabel Toom, Mirtel Marjapuu, Kaisa Laas, Karina Krit, Grete Magerramov, Mia Natalie Sikk; Piruett Senior Team; Liz Margaret Kõõra, Mari Rumm, Emilia Zolotarjov, Sonia Tobler, Krõõt Kudeviita, Irina Petrova, Hanna Sirk, Kristella Kempi	Kazakhstan; Samruk; Akerke Onggarbay, Sofiya Zharkenova, Adina Kabdula, Damilya Sanatova, Indira Boskeyeva, Aiganym Mukhamediya, Dariya Kassayeva; Flame; Ninel Niyazova, Milena Odeichuk, Mereilen Satanova, Aruana Zhaksylyk, Inzhu Kurmangaliyeva, Kamila Jandossova, Sofya Tsurkan, Sayazhan Shakhkarim, Diana Uassiyeva; Asyl Tas; Nikol Shaibakova, Alua Maksat, Elriza Mussa, Alken Amangeldy, Karina Bayanova, Adema Muratova, Anelya Amireshova, Viktoriya Chubova, Diana Dinayeva
Junior Team	Finland; Minetit Junior; Mila Hagman, Ella Koskinen, Minttu Mikkola, Siiri Muilu, Serafiina Niininen, Lilja Peurakoski, Elle Sovelius, Stella Veneskoski, Nea Vuoristo; OVO Junior Team; Aida Berglund, Enni Hämäläinen, Mimosa Järvelä, Noona Kellas, Melina Marila, Emilia Mattila, Neela Mollberg, Julia Paasikivi, Sofia Perova, Veera Pohjavuori, Stella Saarinen, Laura Seppä, Minea Vadell, Magdalena Westersten; Gloria Junior; Rauha Aarnos, Lotta Martikainen, Joanna Söderström, Pihla Miettola, Siiri Hämäläinen, Sienna Rautemaa, Veera Salminen, Sofia Bond, Iiris Mikkilä, Ella Tamminen, Meri Myllylä, Inka Rossi	Estonia; Rebasesabad; Elisabeth Reinthal, Maris Sarapuu, Loviisa Paas, Jana Lanevski, Laara Jakovlev, Birgit Pärn, Triinu Õun, Blanka Treufeldt, Kristelle Laanejõe, Valeria Valasevits; Rebased; Mirtel Laeva, Erin Lemendik, Doris Kavald, Keit - Ree Viira, Laura Sirelpuu, Mairel Jürison, Mari - Liis Kallari, Aleksandra Maria Tuvi, Rebeka Hõbejärv, Lilli Härmson; Melissa; Karolin Mesikäpp, Annabel Steinberg, Elisabeth Mii Arbeiter, Karmen Balõnski, Maria Brigitta Linno, Nora Maria Keinast, Rianna Sikk, Gloria Kuum	Kazakhstan; Alan Junior; Rauana Albekova, Aisha Mukhitbekova, Varvara Kondratenko, Darina Nakyp, Islana Ruslankyzy, Adina Orynbay, Liliya Yun, Sofya Yun, Ayazhan Kokteubay; Izumrud Korkem; Ayaulym Zhanibek, Yerkezhan Sagat, Inkar Satemirova, Adiya Amantayeva, Aisha Raimbekova, Altyn Askar, Ademi Berikkaliyeva, Yekaterina Radysh, Alina Kryutchenko; Liel; Aisha Shokparbay, Margarita Kurilovskaya, Dayana Salimbayeva, Alima Savazova, Elina Azizova, Emiliya Khairutdinova, Amina Abdulzhanova, Narmin Aznabakiyeva, Adilyam Raziyeva

== Results ==
The top 12 teams (2 per country) and the host country in Preliminaries qualify to the Finals. USA took a place in the final because each continent has to be represented and they were next highest ranked in Qualification.

=== Senior ===
Place	Nation	Name	Preliminaries	Final	Total
1st place, gold medalist(s)	Finland	Minetit	28.500 (2)	28.750 (1)	57.250
2nd place, silver medalist(s)	Bulgaria	The National team	28.550 (1)	28.400 (2)	56.950
3rd place, bronze medalist(s)	Estonia	Siidisabad	27.950 (3)	27.900 (3)	55.850
4	Finland	OVO Team	27.400 (4)	27.150 (4)	54.550
5	Japan	Team Shoin	25.000 (7)	25.450 (5)	50.450
6	Estonia	Violett	25.200 (6)	24.800 (6)	50.000
7	Czech Republic	SK MG Mantila Brno - Team Fénix	24.250 (8)	24.450 (7)	48.700
8	Kazakhstan	Samruk	24.250 (8)	24.050 (9)	48.300
9	Ukraine	Grand-Victory	23.900 (13)	24.250 (8)	48.150
10	Kazakhstan	Flame	23.850 (14)	23.800 (10)	47.650
11	Czech Republic	Prague AGG Team Thunder	24.000 (11)	23.500 (11)	47.500
12	Luxembourg	Rythmo-Cats Luxembourg	23.150 (15)	23.250 (12)	46.400
13	USA	National Team Elara	22.800 (17)	22.050 (13)	44.850
14	Finland	Gloria	27.150 (5)	-	27.150
15	Estonia	Piruett Senior Team	24.050 (10)	-	24.050
16	Estonia	Diente	24.000 (11)	-	24.000
17	Ukraine	Avangard	22.900 (16)	-	22.900
18	Denmark	Team Azurit	22.500 (18)	-	22.500
19	France	Esperenza	22.300 (19)	-	22.300
20	Kazakhstan	Asyl Tas	22.250 (20)	-	22.250
21	Ukraine	Sky	22.050 (21)	-	22.050
22	Malaysia	Team Malaysia	21.350 (22)	-	21.350
23	Serbia	Euphoria	18.850 (23)	-	18.850
24	Kyrgyzstan	Elegance Grand	18.650 (24)	-	18.650
25	France	Diamant	17.450 (25)	-	17.450
26	France	Spirit Estello	17.350 (26)	-	17.350

=== Junior ===
Place	Nation	Name	Preliminaries	Final	Total
1st place, gold medalist(s)	Finland	Minetit Junior	27.950 (1)	27.650 (1)	55.600
2nd place, silver medalist(s)	Estonia	Rebasesabad	27.300 (3)	27.550 (2)	54.850
3rd place, bronze medalist(s)	Bulgaria	National Team	27.100 (4)	27.400 (3)	54.500
4	Finland	OVO Junior Team	27.350 (2)	26.900 (4)	54.250
5	Estonia	Rebased	26.050 (6)	25.750 (5)	51.800
6	Kazakhstan	Alan-Junior	24.900 (7)	25.250 (6)	50.150
7	Kazakhstan	Izumrud-Korkem	24.350 (8)	24.400 (8)	48.750
8	Czech Republic	SK MG Mantila Brno - Team Smilles	23.650 (10)	24.450 (7)	48.100
9	Denmark	Team Vivanit	22.950 (11)	23.150 (9)	46.100
10	Moldova	Gloria Junior	22.650 (12)	22.100 (10)	44.750
11	Czech Republic	Storm	22.050 (13)	21.750 (12)	43.800
12	Spain	Ritmica Barcelona	21.800 (16)	21.900 (11)	43.700
13	USA	National Team	20.900 (19)	20.300 (13)	41.200
14	Finland	Gloria Junior	27.000 (5)	-	27.000
15	Kazakhstan	Liel	24.050 (9)	-	24.050
16	Estonia	Melissa	22.000 (14)	-	22.000
17	Estonia	Esperanza	21.950 (15)	-	21.950
18	Spain	Gimnasia Sagunto	21.600 (17)	-	21.600
19	Czech Republic	Team Flare	21.250 (18)	-	21.250
20	Kyrgyzstan	Elegance	19.900 (20)	-	19.900
21	Serbia	Junior Team Serbia	19.900 (20)	-	19.900
22	Ukraine	Avangard Junior	19.700 (22)	-	19.700
23	Kyrgyzstan	Fenix	19.650 (23)	-	19.650
24	Spain	Ximnasia Oleiros	19.650 (23)	-	19.650
25	France	Massilia	19.400 (25)	-	19.400
26	Greece	Olympia Junior	19.300 (26)	-	19.300
27	Malaysia	Malaysia Junior Team	19.200 (27)	-	19.200
28	Cyprus	Sellacco	18.400 (28)	-	18.400
29	Andorra	Club Ritmica Valira	17.600 (29)	-	17.600

== Medal table ==
Rank	Nation	Gold	Silver	Bronze	Total
1	Finland (FIN)	4	0	0	4
2	Estonia (EST)	0	3	1	4
3	Bulgaria (BUL)	0	1	1	2
4	Kazakhstan (KAZ)	0	0	2	2
Totals (4 entries)		4	4	4	12
