= Finnish Aesthetic Group Gymnastics Championships =

Annual Finnish gymnastic competition

The Finnish Aesthetic Group Gymnastics Championships is an annual aesthetic group gymnastics national competition in Finland.

== Senior category ==
Senior medalists
Year	Location	Gold	Silver	Bronze
2007	Jyväskylä	Frida	Elegia	Minorit
2008	Jyväskylä	Deltat	Elegia	Sudenkorennot
2009	Jyväskylä	Deltat	Freyat	Hämppikset
2010	Vantaa	Ampeerit	Fotonit	Freyat
2011	Tampere	OVO Team	Minetit	Sirius
2012	Helsinki	OVO Team	Minetit	Sanix
2013	Tampere	OVO Team	Minetit	Sirius
2014	Jyväskylä	OVO Team	Sanix	Team Vantaa
2015	Espoo	Minetit	OVO Team	OVO Team Esport
2016	Vantaa	Minetit	OVO Team	Team Vantaa
2017	Jyväskylä	Minetit	OVO Team	Team Vantaa
2018	Turku	Minetit	OVO Team	Gloria
2019	Turku	Minetit	OVO Team	Gloria
2020	Helsinki	Minetit	OVO Team	Gloria
2021	Tampere	OVO Team	Minetit	Gloria

== Junior category ==
Junior medalists
Year	Location	Gold	Silver	Bronze
2008	Jyväskylä	Fotonit	Minetit	Mimodes
2009	Jyväskylä	Minetit	La Strada	Mimodes
2010	Vantaa	Fosforit	La Strada	Kidea
2011	Tampere	Fosforit	Sanix	Gloria
2012	Helsinki	OVO Junior Team Magneetit	Tähdettäret and Team Vantaa Junior	N/A
2013	Tampere	Team Minetit	OVO Junior Team	Team Vantaa Junior
2014	Jyväskylä	Minetit	OVO Junior Team	Minetit United
2015	Espoo	Minetit	OVO Junior Team	Elite
2016	Vantaa	OVO Junior Team	Minetit	Elite
2017	Jyväskylä	Minetit Elite	OVO Junior Team	Gloria Junior
2018	Turku	OVO Junior Team	Minetit Junior	Elite
2019	Turku	OVO Junior Team	Illusion Junior	Minetit Elite
2020	Helsinki	OVO Junior Team	Minetit Junior	Elite Junior
2021	Tampere	Minetit Junior	OVO Junior Team	Elite Junior
