= 2003 World Aesthetic Group Gymnastics Championships =

International gymnastics competition

- Location: Graz, Austria
- Start date: 23 May 2003
- End date: 24 May 2003

The 2003 World Aesthetic Gymnastics Championships, the 4th edition of the Aesthetic group gymnastics competition, was held in Graz, Austria from May 23 to 24.

== Medal winners ==
Event	Gold	Silver	Bronze
Senior Final	Olarin Voimistelijat/Dynamot Finland Aalto Hanna, Laavi Helena, Loikas Liisa, Reijonen Jenni, Thesleff Paula, Topp Juuli, Törnqvist Sara, Virtanen Tiina	Olarin Voimistelijat/Elektronit Finland Koskimies Maijastiina, Kurkela Anna, Mavrakis Christina, Niittylä Aino, Noponen Katja, Raitio Essi, Savolainen Joanna	GC Janika Estonia
