= 2001 World Aesthetic Group Gymnastics Championships =

International gymnastics competition

2001 World Aesthetic Gymnastics Championships
- Venue: Kalev Sports Hall
- Location: Tallinn, Estonia
- Start date: 29 June 2001
- End date: 30 June 2001

The 2001 World Aesthetic Gymnastics Championships, the 2nd edition of the Aesthetic group gymnastics competition, was held in Tallinn, Estonia from June 29 to 30, at the Kalev Sports Hall.

== Participating nations ==
- Austria
- Canada
- Czech Republic
- Denmark
- Estonia
- Finland
- Latvia
- Sweden

== Results ==
| Place | Nation | Name | Preliminaries | Final | Total |
|---|---|---|---|---|---|
| 1st place, gold medalist(s) | Estonia | GC Piruett | 18.900 (1) | 19.200 (1) | 38.100 |
| 2nd place, silver medalist(s) | Finland | Lahjan Tytöt | 18.850 (2) | 18.950 (2) | 37.800 |
| 3rd place, bronze medalist(s) | Estonia | SC Velar | 18.650 (3) | 18.850 (4) | 37.500 |
| 3rd place, bronze medalist(s) | Finland | Olarin Voimistelijat | 18.600 (4) | 18.900 (3) | 37.500 |
| 5 | Czech Republic | Sokol Opava - Havirov | 18.000 (6) | 18.150 (5) | 36.150 |
| 6 | Czech Republic | Sokol Prague | 17.050 (9) | 17.500 (6) | 34.550 |
| 7 | Austria | Tanzfabrik ATG | 16.850 (10) | 16.950 (7) | 33.800 |
| 8 | Latvia | Riga Tech.Univ-Latvian SP.Ped | 16.000 (11) | 16.200 (8) | 32.200 |
| 9 | Latvia | Kotri Skulpturas | 16.000 (11) | 15.950 (9) | 31.950 |
| 10 | Finland | Vantaan Voimisteluseura | 18.450 (5) | | 18.450 |
| 11 | Estonia | SC of Tartu University | 17.450 (7) | | 17.450 |
| 12 | Estonia | GC Janika | 17.400 (8) | | 17.400 |
| 13 | Canada | Kalev Rhythmic Dance Ens. | 15.600 (13) | | 15.600 |
| 14 | Czech Republic | TJ Sokol Velky Tynec-Olomouc | 15.300 (14) | | 15.300 |
| 15 | Canada | Ritmika R.G. | 13.850 (15) | | 13.850 |
| 16 | Latvia | University of Latvia | 13.400 (16) | | 13.400 |
| 17 | Denmark | Club Greve | 11.700 (17) | | 11.700 |
| 18 | Canada | Classical Rhythmic GC of Mississauga | 11.100 (18) | | 11.100 |
| 19 | Canada | Rhythmic Elite | 10.350 (19) | | 10.350 |
| 20 | Sweden | Team Energy | 9.750 (20) | | 9.750 |
