= 2022 World Aesthetic Gymnastics Championships =

World Aesthetic Gymnastics Championships

- Venue: Raiffeisen Sportpark
- Location: Graz, Austria
- Start date: 25 November 2022
- End date: 27 November 2022

The 2022 World Aesthetic Group Gymnastics Championships, the 22nd edition of the Aesthetic group gymnastics competition, was held in Graz, Austria from November 25 to 27, at the Raiffeisen Sportpark.

== Participating countries ==
- Austria
- Bulgaria
- Canada
- Czech Republic
- Denmark
- Estonia
- Finland
- France
- Greece
- Italy
- Japan
- Kazakhstan
- Spain
- Ukraine
- United States

== Medal winners ==
Event	Gold	Silver	Bronze
Senior Final	National Team Bulgaria Victoria Berova, Sibila Karpacheva, Hristiana Kovacheva, Karina Neykova, Siana Tabakova, Daria Kapsazova, Yana Staykova, Maria Mehlemova	Minetit Finland Iinu Häkkinen, Adaliina Niininen, Ellen Aspholm, Sanni Hartman, Sara Hyötyläinen, Katariina Järventausta, Anna Miettinen, Lara Pietilä, Sini Tapio	Gloria Finland Laura Airila, Milla Jääskeläinen, Josefina Ketola, Noora Luoto, Anna Luoto, Hertta Martikainen, Tuuli Mörsky, Tiara Reyes, Justiina Tiittanen, Varvara Yulle
Junior Final	Minetit Junior Finland Tilda Holappa, Jenni Hyytiäinen, Ella Koskinen, Minttu Malinen, Minttu Mikkola, Serafiina Niininen, Lilja Peurakoski	National Team Bulgaria Kristiana Doycheva, Maria Stamenova, Nikol Zlatkova, Nicol Angelova, Simona Berova, Katrin Taseva, Daria Voynova, Raya Srandeva, Nikol Stoyanova	OVO Junior team Finland Ingrid Bergring, Emma Jonsson, Ksenia Kameneva, Vienna Kivelä, Linda Latvanen, Saaga Leppävuori, Selma Länsmans, Oona Räätäri, Laura Seppä, Yagmur Serengil, Emma Törmänen, Alida Virkkunen
Country ranking
Senior Team	Finland; Minetit; Iinu Häkkinen, Adaliina Niininen, Ellen Aspholm, Sanni Hartman, Sara Hyötyläinen, Katariina Järventausta, Anna Miettinen, Lara Pietilä, Sini Tapio; Gloria; Laura Airila, Milla Jääskeläinen, Josefina Ketola, Noora Luoto, Anna Luoto, Hertta Martikainen, Tuuli Mörsky, Tiara Reyes, Justiina Tiittanen, Varvara Yulle; OVO Team	Bulgaria; National Team; Victoria Berova, Sibila Karpacheva, Hristiana Kovacheva, Karina Neykova, Siana Tabakova, Daria Kapsazova, Yana Staykova, Maria Mehlemova; Velbajd Team; Sofia Sport Team	Kazakhstan; Karmelity; Kerbez; Aphrodite
Junior Team	Finland; Minetit Junior; Tilda Holappa, Jenni Hyytiäinen, Ella Koskinen, Minttu Malinen, Minttu Mikkola, Serafiina Niininen, Lilja Peurakoski; OVO Junior Team; Ingrid Bergring, Emma Jonsson, Ksenia Kameneva, Vienna Kivelä, Linda Latvanen, Saaga Leppävuori, Selma Länsmans, Oona Räätäri, Laura Seppä, Yagmur Serengil, Emma Törmänen, Alida Virkkunen Sanix Valens Junior	Estonia; Violett; Rytmika Junior Team; Piruett Junior Team	Kazakhstan; Sunrise; Kerbez Elite; Samruk

== Results ==
=== Senior ===
The top 12 teams (2 per country) and the host country in Preliminaries qualify to the Finals.

Place	Nation	Name	Preliminaries	Final	Total
1st place, gold medalist(s)	Bulgaria	National team	19.050 (1)	19.500 (1)	38.550
2nd place, silver medalist(s)	Finland	Minetit	18.900 (2)	19.300 (2)	38.200
3rd place, bronze medalist(s)	Finland	Gloria	18.700 (3)	18.800 (4)	37.500
4	Estonia	Siidisabad	18.500 (4)	18.950 (3)	37.450
5	Japan	Team Shoin Phoenix	18.300 (6)	18.450 (5)	36.750
6	Czech Republic	SK MG MANTILA BRNO Team Zonja	16.800 (7)	17.450 (6)	34.250
7	Spain	Ritmica Barcelona	16.650 (8)	16.950 (7)	33.600
8	Bulgaria	Velbajd Team	16.400 (9)	16.500 (8)	32.900
9	Kazakhstan	Karmelity	16.050 (12)	16.500 (8)	32.550
10	Kazakhstan	Kerbez	16.350 (10)	16.100 (12)	32.450
11	Ukraine	Grand Victory	15.850 (13)	16.450 (10)	32.300
12	Austria	Tanzfabrik	15.850 (13)	16.200 (11)	32.050
13	Canada	Rhythmic Expression	14.600 (22)	14.450 (13)	29.050
14	Finland	OVO Team	18.450 (5)		18.450
15	Bulgaria	Sofia Sport Team	16.150 (11)		16.150
16	Denmark	Team Aura	15.650 (15)		15.650
17	Denmark	Team Greve	15.550 (16)		15.550
18	Ukraine	Alcor Avangard	15.550 (16)		15.550
19	Czech Republic	GK Velký Týnec, Team Infinity	15.500 (18)		15.500
20	Spain	FC Ritmica Cartagena	15.300 (19)		15.300
20	Estonia	Caresse	15.300 (19)		15.300
22	Kazakhstan	Aphrodite	15.100 (21)		15.100
23	Italy	Team Pro Recco Gym Club	14.300 (23)		14.300
24	France	Team Spirit	11.700 (24)		11.700
25	France	Team Alizea	11.150 (25)		11.150

=== Junior ===
Place	Nation	Name	Preliminaries	Final	Total
1st place, gold medalist(s)	Finland	Minetit Junior	18.800 (1)	19.100 (1)	37.900
2nd place, silver medalist(s)	Bulgaria	National Team	18.500 (2)	19.050 (2)	37.550
3rd place, bronze medalist(s)	Finland	OVO Junior Team	18.500 (2)	18.750 (3)	37.250
4	Estonia	Violett	17.550 (5)	17.100 (5)	34.650
5	Estonia	Rytmika Junior Team	16.800 (7)	17.150 (4)	33.950
6	Kazakhstan	Sunrise	16.850 (6)	17.050 (6)	33.900
7	Kazakhstan	Kerbez Elite	16.750 (8)	16.400 (8)	33.150
8	Czech Republic	Prague AGG Team Thunder	16.300 (9)	16.550 (7)	32.850
9	Czech Republic	SK MG MANTILA Brno Fénix	16.250 (10)	16.400 (8)	32.650
10	Denmark	Team Azurit	15.100 (14)	15.500 (10)	30.600
11	USA	USA NATIONAL TEAM	14.750 (15)	15.150 (11)	29.900
12	Canada	Ritmika Rosettes	14.550 (16)	14.800 (12)	29.350
13	Finland	Sanix Valens Junior	18.250 (4)	-	18.250
14	Kazakhstan	Samruk	16.200 (11)	-	16.200
14	Estonia	Piruett Junior Team	16.200 (11)	-	16.200
16	Czech Republic	STORM	15.400 (13)	-	15.400
17	Spain	Club Gimnasia Sagunto	12.600 (17)	-	12.600
18	Spain	CLUB NESHKA	12.550 (18)	-	12.550
19	Italy	Ginnastica Pro Vercelli 1892	12.250 (19)	-	12.250
20	Greece	Mykonos Junior	11.200 (20)	-	11.200

== Medal table ==
Rank	Nation	Gold	Silver	Bronze	Total
1	Finland (FIN)	3	1	2	6
2	Bulgaria (BUL)	1	2	0	3
3	Estonia (EST)	0	1	0	1
4	Kazakhstan (KAZ)	0	0	2	2
Totals (4 entries)		4	4	4	12
