= 2013 World Aesthetic Group Gymnastics Championships =

International gymnastics competition

2013 World Aesthetic Gymnastics Championships
- Venue: Isku Areena
- Location: Lahti, Finland
- Start date: 7 June 2013
- End date: 9 June 2013

The 2013 World Aesthetic Gymnastics Championships, the 14th edition of the Aesthetic group gymnastics competition, was held in Lahti, Finland from June 7 to 9, at the Isku Areena.

== Participating nations ==
- Austria
- Belarus
- Bulgaria
- Canada
- Czech Republic
- Denmark
- Estonia
- Finland
- Faroe Islands
- Japan
- Latvia
- Russia
- South Africa
- Spain

== Medal winners ==
Event	Gold	Silver	Bronze
Senior Final	Madonna Russia Daria Ereshchenko, Olesya Vanyukova, Aminat Gutsunaeva, Yuliya Sidorova, Marina Onishchenko, Anastasia Karnaukh, Margarita Atamalova, Ksenia Ryazantseva	OVO Team Finland Iida Laitinen, Marianne Vikkula, Johanna Vikkula, Mira Syrjälä, Emilia Jokinen, Jenny Pennanen, Viivi Suomalainen, Jenna Alavahtola	National Team Bulgaria Mariya Asporuhova, Ralitsa Gercheva, Dzhuliya Todorova, Radka Nasteva, Elena Basheva, Viktoria Stoyanova, Desislava Paycheva, Greta Hristova, Veronika Simova

== Results ==
=== Senior ===
The top 12 teams (2 per country) and the host country in Preliminaries qualify to the Finals.

Place	Nation	Name	Preliminaries	Final	Total
1st place, gold medalist(s)	Russia	Madonna	18.900 (1)	19.150 (1)	38.050
2nd place, silver medalist(s)	Finland	OVO Team	18.850 (2)	19.150 (1)	38.000
3rd place, bronze medalist(s)	Bulgaria	National Team	18.650 (3)	19.000 (3)	37.650
4	Estonia	GC Janika Sunshine	18.250 (4)	18.800 (4)	37.050
5	Russia	Nebesa	17.900 (5)	17.600 (5)	35.500
6	Finland	Minetit	17.350 (6)	17.200 (6)	34.550
7	Bulgaria	Levski Bonitas	16.450 (12)	16.750 (7)	33.200
8	Spain	Alcon Cusi	16.500 (11)	16.150 (8)	32.650
9	Canada	Kalev Rhythmic Expressions	16.300 (13)	16.150 (8)	32.450
10	Czech Republic	SK MG Mantila Brno	15.400 (15)	16.150 (8)	31.550
10	Japan	JWCPE Agg Team	15.800 (14)	15.750 (11)	31.550
12	Spain	Muntanyenc Sant Cugat	15.400 (15)	15.350 (12)	30.750
13	RSA	Ocean	10.250 (25)	9.850 (13)	20.100
14	FIN	Sanix	17.200 (7)		17.200
15	FIN	Sirius	17.050 (8)		17.050
16	RUS	Expressia	17.000 (9)		17.000
17	RUS	Oscar	16.900 (10)		16.900
18	BLR	Silfida	15.000 (17)		15.000
19	CZE	TJ Sokol Velky Tynec	14.500 (18)		14.500
20	ESP	INEF Barcelona	13.550 (19)		13.550
21	DEN	Team Greve	13.450 (20)		13.450
22	DEN	Team Embla	13.200 (21)		13.200
23	LAT	Riga Technical University Team	12.250 (22)		12.250
24	FRO	Havnar Fimleikafelag	11.650 (23)		11.650
25	DEN	Taastrup TIK	11.300 (24)		11.300
26	AUT	ÖTB Linz	9.400 (25)		9.400
27	CZE	SK MG Zlin	9.050 (26)		9.050
