= 2010 World Aesthetic Group Gymnastics Championships =

Gymnastics championship

2010 World Aesthetic Gymnastics Championships
- Venue: Palace of Culture and Sports
- Location: Varna, Bulgaria
- Start date: 10 June 2010
- End date: 12 June 2010

The 2010 World Aesthetic Gymnastics Championships, the 11th edition of the Aesthetic group gymnastics competition, was held in Varna, Bulgaria from June 10 to 12, at the Palace of Culture and Sports.

== Participating nations ==
- Austria
- Brazil
- Bulgaria
- Canada
- Czech Republic
- Denmark
- Estonia
- Finland
- Faroe Islands
- Russia
- Slovenia
- Spain
- Ukraine

== Medal winners ==
Event	Gold	Silver	Bronze
Senior Final	Fotonit Finland Laura Isopoussu, Julia Kinnunen, Jenna Alavahtola, Venla Korventausta, Pauliina Lauri, Noora Pohjanen, Aino Pöytäniemi, Victoria Ristikangas, Johanna Vikkula, Sara Välimaa, Sanna Virtanen, Rebecca Sutton	Madonna Russia	National Team Bulgaria Ginka Georgieva, Stasi Chapanova, Stefani Petrova, Kamelia Radeva, Natalia Toncheva, Preslava Valova, Daniela Nikolaeva, Julia Georgieva

== Results ==
=== Senior ===
The top 10 teams (2 per country) and the host country in Preliminaries qualify to the Finals.

Place	Nation	Name	Preliminaries	Final	Total
1st place, gold medalist(s)	Finland	Fotonit	18.450 (1)	18.700 (1)	37.150
2nd place, silver medalist(s)	Russia	Madonna	18.400 (2)	18.700 (1)	37.100
3rd place, bronze medalist(s)	Bulgaria	National Team	18.100 (3)	18.500 (3)	36.600
4	Russia	Oscar	18.100 (3)	18.150 (4)	36.250
5	Finland	Ampeerit	18.100 (3)	17.900 (5)	36.000
6	Bulgaria	Akademik	17.100 (6)	17.100 (6)	34.200
7	Estonia	GC Rytmika	16.600 (7)	16.900 (7)	33.200
8	Estonia	Piruett Elite	16.250 (9)	16.600 (8)	32.650
9	Ukraine	Alcor	16.000 (11)	16.450 (8)	32.450
10	Canada	Rhythmic Expressions	15.850 (12)	16.150 (10)	32.000
11	RUS	Nebesa	16.450 (8)		16.450
12	EST	Piruett	16.250 (9)		16.250
13	Austria	Tanzfabrik ATG	15.750 (13)		15.750
14	Spain	INEF Barcelona	15.650 (14)		15.650
15	Spain	Alcon	15.500 (15)		15.500
16	Czech Republic	Sokol Velky Tynec	14.700 (16)		14.700
17	BUL	Impala	14.100 (17)		14.100
18	BRA	Woman care	13.850 (18)		13.850
19	BRA	Maniotas	13.450 (19)		13.450
20	Faroe Islands	Havnar Fimleikafelag	13.250 (20)		13.250
21	Brazil	ACGRE/CCRN	12.350 (21)		12.350
22	Canada	Canadiana	12.200 (22)		12.200
23	Czech Republic	Mantila Brno	12.000 (23)		12.000
24	Czech Republic	Sokol Opava	11.150 (24)		11.150
25	Denmark	Taastrup	9.950 (25)		9.950
26	Denmark	Greve	9.800 (26)		9.800
27	Slovenia	Sokol Bezigrad	8.200 (27)		8.200
