= 2012 World Aesthetic Group Gymnastics Championships =

2012 Global Gymnastic Championship

2012 World Aesthetic Gymnastics Championships
- Venue: Municipal Sports Hall of Cartagena
- Location: Cartagena, Spain
- Start date: 25 May 2012
- End date: 27 May 2012

The 2012 World Aesthetic Gymnastics Championships, the 13th edition of the Aesthetic group gymnastics competition, was held in Cartagena, Spain from May 25 to 27, at the Municipal Sports Hall of Cartagena.

== Medal winners ==
Event	Gold	Silver	Bronze
Senior Final	Madonna Russia Daria Ereshchenko, Olesya Vanyukova, Aminat Gutsunaeva, Yuliya Sidorova, Anastasia Karnaukh, Margarita Atamalova, Ksenia Ryazantseva	National Team Bulgaria Kristina Tasheva, Mariya Asporuhova, Ralitsa Gercheva, Dzhuliya Todorova, Radka Nasteva, Ginka Georgieva, Viktoria Stoyanova, Desislava Paycheva	Nebesa Russia Maria Ivanova, Angelina Fedorenko, Olga Trofimenko, Irina Elashko, Ksenia Nikolaeva, Kristina Popova, Ekaterina Sokolova, Ekaterina Kirichek
