= 2014 World Aesthetic Group Gymnastics Championships =

Aesthetic gymnastics competition

2014 World Aesthetic Gymnastics Championships
- Location: Moscow, Russia
- Start date: 23 May 2014
- End date: 25 May 2014

The 2014 World Aesthetic Gymnastics Championships, the 15th edition of the Aesthetic group gymnastics competition, was held in Moscow, Russia from May 23 to 25.

== Medal winners ==
Event	Gold	Silver	Bronze
Senior Final	Madonna Russia Margarita Atamalova, Daria Ereshchenko, Aminat Gutsunaeva, Anastasia Karnaukh, Marina Onishchenko, Kseniia Riazantceva, Yulia Urantceva, Olesia Vaniukova, Anastasia Ananeva	National Team Bulgaria Dzhordziya Popova, Greta Hristova, Veronika Simova, Aleksandra Stefanova, Kristina Mihova, Kristalina Atanasova, Simova Yakimova, Ralitsa Gercheva	Expressia Russia Anastasiya Chernyaeva, Tatiana Filonets, Yana Mikitenko, Elena Romanchenko, Olga Romanchenko, Anastasiia Shchuka, Yana Sochugova, Arina Ten, Alina Vorontsova
Junior Final	Victoria Russia Polina Baranova, Sofia Blinova, Anastasiia Deryabina, Daria Kozenko, Liubov Palchikova, Polina Shunina, Valeriya Uryupina, Alisa Znamenskaya	Minetit Finland Camilla Berg, Janica Berg, Ronja Hakala, Venla Lampo, Liisa Lepola, Viivi-Sofia Minkkinen, Venla Niemenmaa, Ella Ratilainen, Elena Ticklen	Ovo Jr. Finland Cecilia Af Hällström, Eeva Jokinen, Merili Keltanen, Irina Khanoukaeva, Sanni Lehto, Iida Pasanen, Jasmin Rasinkangas, Sanna Väkiparta, Ella Väisänen, Vilma Välimäki
