= Druzhba Multipurpose Arena =

Sports building in Moscow, Russia

Coordinates: 55°42′45″N 37°34′0″E

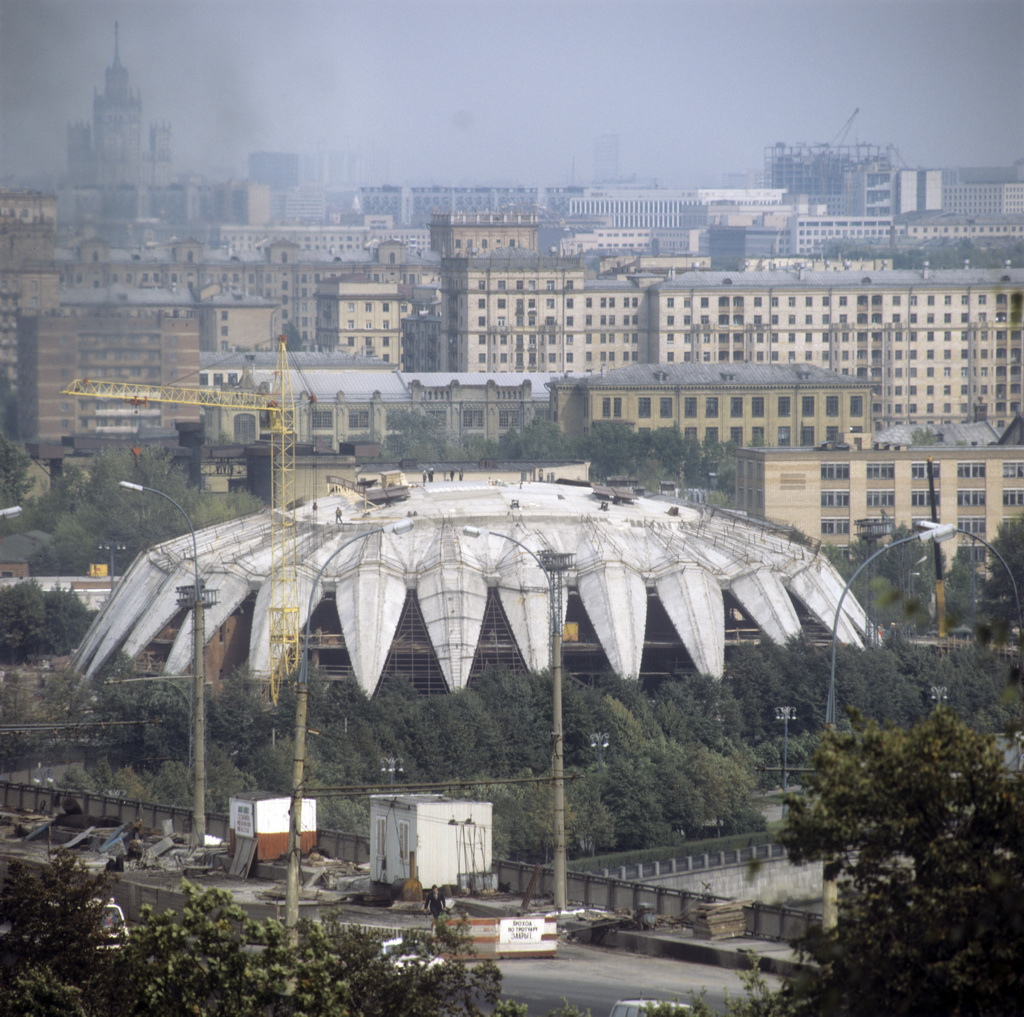
Druzhba Multipurpose Arena under construction, July 1978

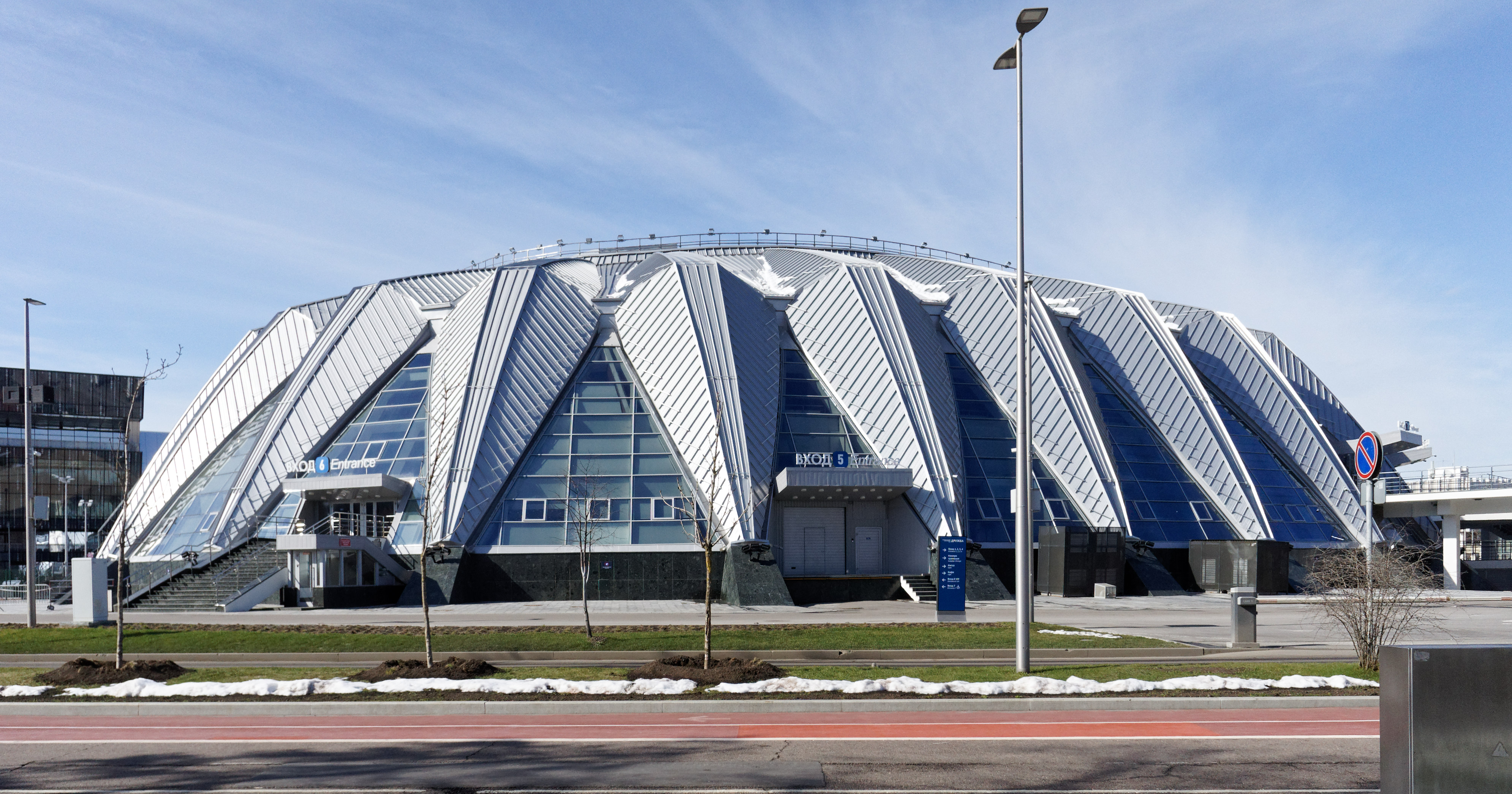
Druzhba Multipurpose Arena as it appears in 2025

The Druzhba Multipurpose Arena (Russian: Универсальный спортивный зал "Дружба") is an indoor arena in Moscow, Russia, part of the Luzhniki Sports Complex. It was built in 1979, and the first competition held there was the finals of the 7th USSR Summer Spartakiad. It hosted volleyball preliminaries of the 1980 Summer Olympics and was a venue of the 1986 Goodwill Games (women's basketball, freestyle wrestling, judo and handball events were held there). The capacity of the arena is for 3,500 people and is the regular home venue of WVC Dynamo Moscow Volleyball team.
