= World Aesthetic Group Gymnastics Championships =

World championships for the sport of aesthetic group gymnastics

The Aesthetic Group Gymnastics World Championships are the world championships for the sport of aesthetic group gymnastics. Aesthetic Group Gymnastics is a discipline not currently recognized by the Fédération Internationale de Gymnastique. World Championships are organized annually since 2000 by the International Federation of Aesthetic Group Gymnastics (IFAGG).

== Categories ==
World Championships are organized every year for both Juniors and Seniors at the same time. Each gymnast can compete in only one of the following categories:

- World Championships Junior
- World Championships Senior
- IFAGG Trophy Mixed Junior
- IFAGG Trophy Mixed Senior
- IFAGG Trophy Short Program Junior
- IFAGG Trophy Short Program Senior
- IFAGG Trophy Short Program Mixed Junior
- IFAGG Trophy Short Program Mixed Senior

Note
Mixed teams are made of at least 2 female gymnasts and 2 male gymnasts.

== Editions ==
Year	Edition	Host city	Country	Events (female)	Most gold medals
2000	1	Helsinki	Finland	1	Finland
2001	2	Tallinn	Estonia	1	Estonia
2002	3	Prague	Czech Republic	1	Finland
2003	4	Graz	Austria	1	Finland
2004	5	Sofia	Bulgaria	1	Finland
2005	6	Copenhagen	Denmark	1	Russia
2006	7	Tampere	Finland	1	Finland
2007	8	Salou	Spain	1	Estonia
2008	9	Toronto	Canada	1	Finland
2009	10	Moscow	Russia	1	Finland
2010	11	Varna	Bulgaria	1	Finland
2011	12	Tartu	Estonia	1	Russia
2012	13	Cartagena	Spain	1	Russia
2013	14	Lahti	Finland	1	Russia
2014	15	Moscow	Russia	1	Russia
2015	16	Tórshavn	Faroe Islands	1	Finland
2016	17	Brno	Czech Republic	1	Russia
2017	18	Helsinki	Finland	1	Finland
2018	19	Budapest	Hungary	1	Russia
2019	20	Cartagena	Spain	1	Russia
2020	-	~~Sofia~~	~~Bulgaria~~	~~1~~	Cancelled
2021	21	Helsinki	Finland	1	Finland
2022	22	Graz	Austria	1	Finland
2023	23	Almaty	Kazakhstan	1	RGF
2024	24	Tartu	Estonia	1	Finland
2025	25	Samokov	Bulgaria	1	Finland
2026	26	Osaka	Japan	1	Future event
2027	27	Paris	France	1	Future event
2028	28	Graz	Austria	1	Future event

== Medalists ==
=== Senior ===
Year	Location	Gold	Silver	Bronze
2000	(Finland) Helsinki	Finland; Campuksen Koonto	Estonia; GC Piruett	Finland; Lahjan Tytöt
2001	(Estonia) Tallinn	Estonia; GC Piruett	Finland; Lahjan Tytöt/Pantterit	Estonia; SC Velar
2001	(Estonia) Tallinn	Estonia; GC Piruett	Finland; Lahjan Tytöt/Pantterit	Finland; Olarin Voimistelijat
2002	(Czech Republic) Prague	Finland; Olarin Voimistelijat/Dynamot	Russia; Vozrozhdenie	Russia; Vera Sport Club
2003	(Austria) Graz	Finland; Olarin Voimistelijat/Dynamot	Finland; Olarin Voimistelijat/Elektronit	Estonia; GC Janika
2004	(Bulgaria) Sofia	Finland; Olarin Voimistelijat/Dynamot	Russia; SC Oscar	Russia; SC Roxett
2005	(Denmark) Copenhagen	Russia; SC Roxett	Finland; Vantaan Voimisteluseura/Frida	Estonia; GC Piruett
2006	(Finland) Tampere	Finland; Olarin Voimistelijat/Dynamot	Bulgaria; National Team	Russia; SC Roxett
2007	(Spain) Salou	Estonia; GC Janika	Bulgaria; National Team	Russia; SC Oscar
2008	(Canada) Toronto	Finland; Olarin Voimistelijat/Deltat	Estonia; Janika Elite	Bulgaria; National Team
2008	(Canada) Toronto	Finland; Olarin Voimistelijat/Deltat	Estonia; Janika Elite	Russia; SC Oscar
2009	(Russia) Moscow	Finland; Deltat	Russia; SC Oscar	Russia; Madonna
2010	(Bulgaria) Varna	Finland; Fotonit/OVO	Russia; Madonna	Bulgaria; National Team
2011	(Estonia) Tartu	Russia; Madonna	Bulgaria; National Team	Estonia; Joint Elite Team
2012	(Spain) Cartagena	Russia; Madonna	Bulgaria; National Team	Russia; Nebesa
2013	(Finland) Lahti	Russia; Madonna	Finland; OVO Team	Bulgaria; National Team
2014	(Russia) Moscow	Russia; Madonna	Bulgaria; National Team	Russia; Expressia
2015	(Denmark) Tórshavn	Finland; Minetit	Russia; Expressia	Bulgaria; National Team
2016	(Czech Republic) Brno	Russia; Expressia	Finland; Minetit	Russia; Madonna
2017	(Finland) Helsinki	Finland; Minetit	Russia; Expressia	Finland; OVO Team
2018	(Hungary) Budapest	Russia; Madonna	Finland; Minetit	Russia; Expressia
2019	(Spain) Cartagena	Russia; Madonna	Finland; Minetit	Finland; OVO Team
2021	(Finland) Helsinki	Finland; Minetit	Russia; Madonna	Russia; Expressia
2022	(Austria) Graz	Bulgaria; National Team	Finland; Minetit	Finland; Gloria
2023	(Kazakhstan) Almaty	RGF; Expressia	Bulgaria; The National Team	Bulgaria; National Team
2023	(Kazakhstan) Almaty	RGF; Expressia	Bulgaria; The National Team	RGF; Madonna
2024	(Estonia) Tartu	Finland; Minetit	Bulgaria; National Team	Estonia; Siidisabad
2025	(Bulgaria) Samokov	Bulgaria; The National Team	RGF; Madonna	Finland; Minetit
2025	(Bulgaria) Samokov	Bulgaria; The National Team	RGF; Madonna	RGF; Expressia

=== Junior ===
Note: First Junior World Championship event was held in 2005.

Year	Location	Gold	Silver	Bronze
2005	(Czech Republic) Plzeň	Finland; Olarin Voimistelijat/Deltat	Russia; SC Roxett	Estonia; GC Meetrum
2006	(Estonia) Tallinn	Finland; Olarin Voimistelijat/Alfat	Estonia; GC Janika	Russia; Yunona
2007	(Finland) Espoo	Finland; Olarin Voimistelijat/Ampeerit	Estonia; GC Janika	Finland; VVS/Tiklit
2008	(Spain) Cartagena	Finland; Olarin Voimistelijat/Fotonit	Russia; Victoria	Russia; Sonet
2009	(Russia) Rostov-on-Don	Russia; Victoria	Russia; Sonet	Ukraine; National team
2010	(Czech Republic) Brno	Russia; Victoria	Finland; Fosforit	Russia; Vdokhnovenie
2011	(Spain) Vigo	Russia; Roxett	Russia; Sonet	Estonia; Janica Sunshine
2012	(Bulgaria) Varna	Russia; Roxett	Russia; Vdokhnovenie	Bulgaria; National Team
2013	(Bulgaria) Sofia	Russia; Victoria	Finland; Minetit	Finland; OVO Junior team
2014	(Russia) Moscow	Russia; Victoria	Finland; Minetit	Finland; OVO Junior team
2015	(Denmark) Tórshavn	Russia; Victoria	Finland; Minetit Junior	Bulgaria; National Team
2016	(Czech Republic) Brno	Russia; Victoria	Finland; OVO Junior team	Finland; Minetit
2017	(Finland) Helsinki	Finland; Minetit Elite	Finland; OVO Junior team	Russia; Victoria
2018	(Hungary) Budapest	Russia; Victoria	Finland; Minetit Junior	Russia; Victoria Strela
2019	(Spain) Cartagena	Finland; OVO Junior team	Russia; Victoria Strela	Russia; Victoria
2021	(Finland) Helsinki	Russia; Victoria	Finland; Minetit Junior	Finland; OVO Junior team
2022	(Austria) Graz	Finland; Minetit Junior	Bulgaria; National Team	Finland; OVO Junior team
2023	(Kazakhstan) Almaty	RGF; Victoria	RGF; Madonna Junior	Bulgaria; National Team
2023	(Kazakhstan) Almaty	RGF; Victoria	RGF; Madonna Junior	Kazakhstan; Samruk
2024	(Estonia) Tartu	Finland; Minetit Junior	Estonia; Rebasesabad	Bulgaria; National Team
2025	(Bulgaria) Samokov	RGF; Madonna Junior	Finland; Minetit Junior	Bulgaria; National Team

== All-time medal table ==
2000–2025

- Last updated after the 2025 World Aesthetic Group Gymnastics Championships (Junior)

Rank	Nation	Gold	Silver	Bronze	Total
1	Finland	20	17	11	48
2	Russia	18	13	17	48
3	RGF	3	1	1	5
4	Estonia	2	5	7	14
5	Bulgaria	1	8	10	19
6	Kazakhstan	0	0	1	1
6	Ukraine	0	0	1	1
Totals (7 entries)		44	44	48	136

== Team competition ==
=== Senior ===
Note: Awarding ceremony for country ranking has been organized since 2011.

Year	Location	Gold	Silver	Bronze
2012	(Spain) Cartagena	Russia; Madonna; Nebesa; Oscar	Finland; OVO Team; Minetit; Sanix	Spain; Alcon Cusi Dvillena; Inef Catalunya Barcelona; Maniotas
2013	(Finland) Lahti	Russia; Madonna; Nebesa; Expressia	Finland; OVO Team; Minetit; Sanix	Spain; Alcon Cusi; Muntanyenc Sant Cugat; Inef Barcelona
2014	(Russia) Moscow	Russia; Madonna; Expressia; Roxett	Finland; OVO Team; Sanix; Team Vantaa	Spain; Alcon Cusi; Gimnastica Sant Cugat; Ritmica Cartagena
2015	(Denmark) Tórshavn	Russia; Expressia; Madonna; Nebesa	Finland; Minetit; OVO Team; OVO Team Esport	Spain; Inef Barcelona; Ritmica Cartagena; Acordes Naron
2016	(Czech Republic) Brno	Russia; Expressia; Madonna; Nebesa	Finland; Minetit; OVO Team; Team Vantaa	Japan; Team Japan; Team Shoin; JWCPE AGG Team
2017	(Finland) Helsinki	Russia; Expressia; Madonna; Nebesa	Finland; Minetit; OVO Team; Sirius	Estonia; GC Janika Diamonds; GC Rytmika Perfetto; GC Janika Tallinn Senior Team
2018	(Hungary) Budapest	Russia; Madonna; Expressia; Nebesa	Finland; Minetit; OVO Team; Gloria	Japan; Team Japan; Team Shoin; JWCPE AGG Team
2019	(Spain) Cartagena	Russia; Madonna; Expressia; Nebesa	Finland; Minetit; OVO Team; Gloria	Japan; Team Japan; JWCPE AGG Team; Team Shoin
2021	(Finland) Helsinki	Russia; Madonna; Expressia; Nebesa	Finland; Minetit; OVO Team; Gloria	Bulgaria; National team Impala team Etar Elit
2022	(Austria) Graz	Finland; Minetit; Gloria; OVO Team	Bulgaria; National team Velbajd Team; Sofia Sport Team	Kazakhstan; Karmelity; Kerbez; Aphrodite
2023	(Kazakhstan) Almaty	RGF; Expressia; Madonna; Amuazh	Bulgaria; The National Team; National Team; Velbajd	Kazakhstan; Freedom; Sunrise; Karmelites
2024	(Estonia) Tartu	Finland; Minetit; OVO Team; Gloria	Estonia; Siidisabad; Violett; Piruett Senior Team	Kazakhstan; Samruk; Flame; Asyl Tas
2025	(Bulgaria) Samokov	Finland; Minetit; OVO Team; Sirius	Bulgaria; The National Team; Academic; Velbajd	Estonia; Rebasesabad; Esperanza; Melissa

=== Junior ===
Year	Location	Gold	Silver	Bronze
2014	(Russia) Moscow	Finland; Minetit; OVO Junior Team; Minetit United	Russia; Victoria; Ocharovanie; Idel	Estonia; GC Janika Junior Team; GC Rytmika Perfetto; GC Janika Junior Elite
2015	(Denmark) Tórshavn	Finland; Minetit Juniors; OVO Junior Team; Elite	Russia; Victoria; Roxett; Sonet	Estonia; Diamonds; GC Rytmika Perfetto; Forfett
2016	(Czech Republic) Brno	Finland; OVO Junior Team; Minetit Juniors; Elite Juniors	Russia; Victoria; Sonet; Roxett	Estonia; GC Janika Diamonds; GC Janika Tallinn Junior Elite; GC Janika Rosett
2017	(Finland) Helsinki	Finland; Minetit Elite; OVO Junior Team; Minetit Elite United	Russia; Victoria; Victoria Strela; Roxett	Estonia; GC Rytmika Perfetto Juniors; GC Janika Rosett; GC Janika Mireth
2018	(Hungary) Budapest	Russia; Victoria; Victoria Strela; Oscar	Finland; Minetit Elite; OVO Junior Team; Elite	Estonia; GC Rytmika Junior Team; Mireth; Grisete
2019	(Spain) Cartagena	Russia; Victoria Strela; Victoria; Oscar	Finland; OVO Junior Team; Minetit Elite; Illusion Jr.	Spain; Gimnasia San Anton Cartagena; Ritmica Barcelona; Gymnos'85
2021	(Finland) Helsinki	Finland; Minetit Junior; OVO Junior Team; Sanix Valens Junior	Russia; Victoria; Madonna Junior; Oscar	Estonia; Siidisabad; Violett; Piruett Junior Team
2022	(Austria) Graz	Finland; Minetit Junior; OVO Junior Team; Sanix Valens Junior	Estonia; Violett; Rytmika Junior Team; Piruett Junior Team	Kazakhstan; Sunrise; Kerbez Elite; Samruk
2023	(Kazakhstan) Almaty	RGF; Victoria; Madonna Junior; Victoria Strela	Kazakhstan; Samruk; Kerbez Elite; Alan Junior	Kyrgyzstan; Fenix; Elegance
2024	(Estonia) Tartu	Finland; Minetit Junior; OVO Junior Team; Gloria Junior	Estonia; Rebasesabad; Rebased; Melissa	Kazakhstan; Alan-Junior; Izumrud-Korkem; Liel
2025	(Bulgaria) Samokov	Finland; Minetit Junior; OVO Junior Team; Team Freyat	Bulgaria; National Team; Team Academic juniors Team Etar elit	Estonia; Rebasesabad Junior; Minella; Piruett Junior Team

== Country competition medal table ==
2000–2025

- Last updated after the 2025 World Aesthetic Group Gymnastics Championships

Rank	Nation	Gold	Silver	Bronze	Total
1	Finland	11	11	0	22
2	Russia	11	5	0	16
3	RGF	2	0	0	2
4	Bulgaria	0	5	2	7
5	Estonia	0	3	9	12
6	Kazakhstan	0	1	5	6
7	Spain	0	0	5	5
8	Japan	0	0	3	3
9	Kyrgyzstan	0	0	1	1
Totals (9 entries)		24	25	25	74
