= 2016 World Aesthetic Group Gymnastics Championships =

International gymnastics competition

2016 World Aesthetic Gymnastics Championships
- Venue: Sport hall Vodova
- Location: Brno, Czech Republic
- Start date: 9 June 2016
- End date: 12 June 2016

The 2016 World Aesthetic Gymnastics Championships, the 17th edition of the Aesthetic group gymnastics competition, was held in Brno, Czech Republic from June 9 to 12, at the Sport hall Vodova.

== Participating nations ==
- Austria
- Belarus
- Bulgaria
- Canada
- Czech Republic
- Denmark
- Estonia
- Finland
- France
- Faroe Islands
- Hungary
- Italy
- Japan
- Mexico
- Norway
- Russia
- Spain
- Turkey
- Ukraine
- United States

== Medal winners ==
Event	Gold	Silver	Bronze
Senior Final	Expressia Russia Alina Vorontsova, Anastasia Kozhemyakina, Kristina Panarina, Elena Romanchenko, Olga Romanchenko, Yana Sochugova, Arina Ten, Anastasiya Chernyaeva, Anastasia Yarkova	Minetit Finland Camilla Berg, Janica Berg, Ronja Hakala, Venla Lampo, Liisa Lepola, Venla Niemenmaa, Emmi Nikkilä, Siiri Puuska, Ella Ratilainen, Elena Ticklen	Madonna Russia Daria Zhdanova, Alexandra Kuznetsova, Daria Kuklina, Maria Maltseva, Daria Nagornova, Khristina Obolskaia, Marina Onishchenko, Lyubov Palchikova, Anastasiia Ponikarova, Polina Sosnina, Valeriya Uryupina
Junior Final	Victoria Russia Irina Titenko, Aleksandra Danilina, Daria Zhukova, Daria Belyaeva, Anastasiia Khakhulina, Polina Baranova, Arina Shishenina, Irina Marekina	OVO Junior Team Finland Gonzalez Yli-mäyry Laura, Kangas Amanda, Kauppila Silja, Matt Laurel, Naumanen Sonja, Piippo Sandra, Ruismäki Kaisa, Salmi Vilja, Simmelvuo Fanny	Minetit Jr. Finland Julia Järventö, Tuuli Kankaanpää, Emilia Minkkinen, Viivi-Sofia Minkkinen, Jasmine Niemelä, Viivi Saarenrinne, Pihla Silvennoinen, Enni Söderling, Vilhelmiina Viljanen, Milja Vuorenmaa

== Results ==
=== Senior ===
The top 12 teams (2 per country) and the host country in Preliminaries qualify to the Finals.

Place	Nation	Name	Preliminaries	Final	Total
1st place, gold medalist(s)	Russia	Expressia	19.200 (1)	19.200 (1)	38.400
2nd place, silver medalist(s)	Finland	Minetit	19.200 (1)	19.150 (2)	38.350
3rd place, bronze medalist(s)	Russia	Madonna	18.900 (3)	18.850 (3)	37.750
4	Finland	OVO Team	18.800 (4)	18.650 (4)	37.450
5	Japan	Team Japan	18.350 (5)	18.450 (5)	36.800
6	Bulgaria	National team	18.300 (6)	18.300 (6)	36.600
7	Estonia	GC Rytmika Perfetto	17.500 (8)	17.050 (7)	34.550
8	Japan	Team Shoin	16.900 (12)	16.900 (8)	33.800
9	Spain	INEF Barcelona	17.000 (11)	16.650 (9)	33.650
10	Spain	Ciutad de Barcelona Alcon Cusi	16.600 (14)	16.600 (11)	33.200
11	Estonia	GC Janika Tallinn Senior Team	16.050 (15)	16.650 (9)	32.700
12	Canada	Rhythmic Expression	15.700 (16)	15.800 (12)	31.500
13	Czech Republic	TJ Sokol Velký Týnec	15.600 (17)	14.550 (13)	30.150
14	Mexico	Team Mexico	13.900(25)	13.800 (14)	27.700
15	Russia	Nebesa	17.550 (7)		17.550
16	Finland	Team Vantaa	17.150 (9)		17.150
17	Finland	Sirius	17.100 (10)		17.100
18	Japan	JWCPE AGG Team	16.900 (12)		16.900
19	Austria	Tanzfabrik	15.450 (18)		15.450
20	Faroe Islands	Team Hulda	15.400 (19)		15.400
21	Ukraine	Alcor Avangard	15.350 (20)		15.350
22	Bulgaria	Etar Elite	15.200 (21)		15.200
23	Czech Republic	TJ Gumárny Zubří	14.650 (22)		14.650
24	Czech Republic	SK MG Mantila Brno	14.600 (23)		14.600
25	Hungary	Gracia Fair SE	14.000 (24)		14.000
26	Norway	NJÄRD	13.250 (26)		13.250
27	Denmark	Team Aida	13.150 (27)		13.150
27	USA	YAGA ACADEMY	13.150 (28)		13.150
29	Italy	Nervianese Team Minerva	13.000 (29)		13.000
30	Denmark	Team Luna	12.900 (30)		12.900
31	Czech Republic	SK TRASKO Vyškov	12.800 (31)		12.800
32	Denmark	Team Embla	12.650 (32)		12.650
33	Italy	Ginnastica Alba	12.250 (33)		12.250
34	Turkey	EGE University	6.550 (34)		6.550
