= 2011 World Aesthetic Group Gymnastics Championships =

International gymnastics competition

2011 World Aesthetic Gymnastics Championships
- Location: Tartu, Estonia
- Start date: 10 June 2011
- End date: 12 June 2011

The 2011 World Aesthetic Gymnastics Championships, the 12th edition of the Aesthetic group gymnastics competition, was held in Tartu, Estonia from June 10 to 12.

== Medal winners ==
Event	Gold	Silver	Bronze
Senior Final	Madonna Russia Daria Ereshchenko, Olesya Vanyukova, Aminat Gutsunaeva, Yuliya Sidorova, Anastasia Karnaukh, Margarita Atamalova, Ksenia Ryazantseva	National Team Bulgaria Kristina Tasheva, Dilyana Botseva, Maria Asparuhova, Dzhuliya Todorova, Tsvetelina Tuechka, Viktoria Stoianova, Radka Nasteva, Yoanna Ivanova	GC Piruett Estonia Liis Teemusk, Nele Põldvere, Mari Sepp, Valeria Horosheva, Annika Karin Vahter, Endla Vaher, Ave Rohtla, Käroli Kullamaa, Anna Temmo
