= 2015 World Aesthetic Group Gymnastics Championships =

International gymnastics competition

2015 World Aesthetic Gymnastics Championships
- Venue: Ítróttarhøllin á Hálsi
- Location: Tórshavn, Faroe Islands
- Start date: 25 May 2015
- End date: 7 June 2015

The 2015 World Aesthetic Gymnastics Championships, the 16th edition, was held in Tórshavn, Faroe Islands, from May 25 to September 7, 2015 at the Ítróttarhøllin á Hálsi.

== Participating nations ==
- Austria
- Bulgaria
- Canada
- China
- Czech Republic
- Denmark
- Estonia
- Finland
- Faroe Islands
- Italy
- Japan
- Russia
- Spain

== Medal winners ==
Event	Gold	Silver	Bronze
Senior Final	Minetit Finland Emmi Nikkilä, Adeliina Sulkanen, Janica Berg, Sini Niittylahti, Viivi Koski, Liisa Lepola, Elena Ticklen, Venla Niemenmaa, Ella Ratilainen	Expressia Russia Tatiana Filonets, Kristina Yurchenko, Elena Romanchenko, Olga Romanchenko, Anastasiya Chernyaeva, Yana Sochugova, Arina Ten, Alina Vorontsova, Polina Gruzdeva	National team Bulgaria Ralitsa Gercheva, Mina Asenova, Kristalina Atanasova, Kristina Mihova, Greta Hristova, Aleksandra Stefanova, Veronika Simova, Simona Yakimova
Junior Final	Victoria Russia Elizaveta Matikova, Aleksandra Danilina, Anastasia Khakhulina, Valeriya Uryupina, Polina Baranova, Polina Shunina, Daria Melnikova, Arina Shishenina, Irina Titenko	Minetit Jr. Finland Camilla Berg, Ronja Hakala, Ida Harju, Miisa Kauppila, Venla Lampo, Viivi-Sofia Minkkinen, Jasmine Niemelä, Siiri Puuska,	National team Bulgaria Vanesa Peyankova, Mihaela Savova, Elina Kurteva, Elmira Kamusheva, Hristiana Nikolaeva, Raia Litsova, Stefani Stefanova, Monika Sokerova

== Results ==
=== Senior ===
The top 12 teams (2 per country) and the host country in Preliminaries qualify to the Finals.

Place	Nation	Name	Preliminaries	Final	Total
1st place, gold medalist(s)	Finland	Minetit	19.350 (1)	19.500 (1)	38.850
2nd place, silver medalist(s)	Russia	Expressia	19.300 (2)	19.500 (1)	38.800
3rd place, bronze medalist(s)	Bulgaria	National Team	19.000 (3)	19.050 (3)	38.050
4	Finland	OVO Team	18.850 (4)	18.550 (4)	37.400
5	Russia	Madonna	18.800 (5)	18.550 (4)	37.350
6	Estonia	GC Janika Sunshine	18.650 (6)	18.450 (6)	37.100
7	Japan	Team Japan	18.300 (7)	18.400 (7)	36.700
8	Spain	INEF Barcelona	17.900 (8)	18.050 (8)	35.950
9	Spain	Ritmica Cartagena	17.200 (11)	17.800 (9)	35.000
10	Canada	Rhythmic Expressions	16.400 (12)	15.750 (11)	32.150
11	Faroe Islands	Team Havnar Fimleikafelag	15.400 (13)	16.150 (10)	31.550
12	Czech Republic	TJ Sokol Velký Týnec	14.950 (14)	14.750 (12)	31.500
13	Russia	Nebesa	17.450 (9)		17.450
14	Finland	OVO Team Esport	17.350 (10)		17.350
15	Spain	Acordes Naron	14.700 (15)		14.700
16	Austria	Tanzfabrik	14.350 (16)		14.350
17	Czech Republic	SK MG Mantila Zonja	13.900 (17)		13.900
18	China	Team CSU	13.750 (18)		13.750
18	Denmark	Tean Luna	13.750 (18)		13.750
20	Denmark	Team Taastrup	13.400 (19)		13.400
21	Faroe Islands	Team CSU	12.500 (21)		12.500
22	Czech Republic	Tean Luna	12.400 (22)		12.400
23	Italy	Ginnastica Pro Vercelli 1892	10.500 (23)		10.500
