= Artistic Gymnastics Federation of Russia =

Sports governing body in Russia

- Formation: 1991; 35 years ago
- Type: National sports governing body
- Location: Moscow, Luzhnetskaya nab., 8
- Region served: Russia
- President: Andrey L. Kostin
- Affiliations: UEG, FIG
- Website: sportgymrus.ru

The Artistic Gymnastics Federation of Russia (AGFR; Russian: Федерация спортивной гимнастики России, romanized: Federatsiya sportivnoy gimnastiki Rossii) was the governing body of artistic gymnastics in Russia. It was a member federation of both the European Union of Gymnastics and the International Gymnastics Federation.

On 1 October 2024, it was merged into the Russian Gymnastics Federation together with four other Russian sports federations governing specific gymnastics disciplines.

== History ==
The first national federation for Russian gymnastics was the Russian Gymnastics Society, established in the Russian Empire in 1883. Its founding members included Vladimir Gilyarovsky and Anton Chekhov.

Following the revolution of 1917, gymnastics in the Russian SFSR and later Soviet Union was governed by the Gymnastics Section under the Committee for Physical Culture and Sports under the Council of Ministers of the USSR. The most likely year of the Gymnastics Section's creation is 1930, when the All-Union Council on Physical Culture and Sports was formed on the basis of the Committee. The Gymnastics Section became known as the USSR Gymnastics Federation after it joined FIG in 1949.

In 1946, the Committee for Physical Culture and Sports of the Council of Ministers of the Russian SFSR created the Gymnastics Section of the Russian SFSR as the central department of the USSR Gymnastics Section. From 1949, the Gymnastics Section of the Russian SFSR became known as the Federation of Gymnastics of the Russian SFSR.

Following the collapse of the Soviet Union in 1991, the Artistic Gymnastics Federation of Russia was registered with the Ministry of Justice of the Russian Federation as the successor to the Gymnastics Section of the USSR.

After the 2022 Russian invasion of Ukraine, the International Gymnastics Federation (FIG) barred Russian athletes and officials, including judges. It also announced that "all FIG World Cup and World Challenge Cup events planned to take place in Russia ... are cancelled, and no other FIG events will be allocated to Russia ... until further notice." FIG also banned the Russian flag and anthem at its events. European Gymnastics announced in March 2022 that no athletes, officials, and judges from the Russian Gymnastics Federation can participate in any European Gymnastics events, that no European Gymnastics authorities from Russia can pursue their functions, and that European Gymnastics had removed from its calendar all events allocated to Russia and would not allocate any future events to Russia.

== Events ==
The Artistic Gymnastics Federation of Russia organized a number of gymnastics competitions in Russia. Those include:

Competition	Frequency
Russian Artistic Gymnastics Championships	Annually
Russian Junior Artistic Gymnastics Championships	Annually
Cup of Russia in artistic gymnastics	Annually

== See also ==
- Russia men's national gymnastics team
- Russia women's national gymnastics team
- Russian Rhythmic Gymnastics Federation
