= Aesthetic group gymnastics =

Discipline of gymnastics

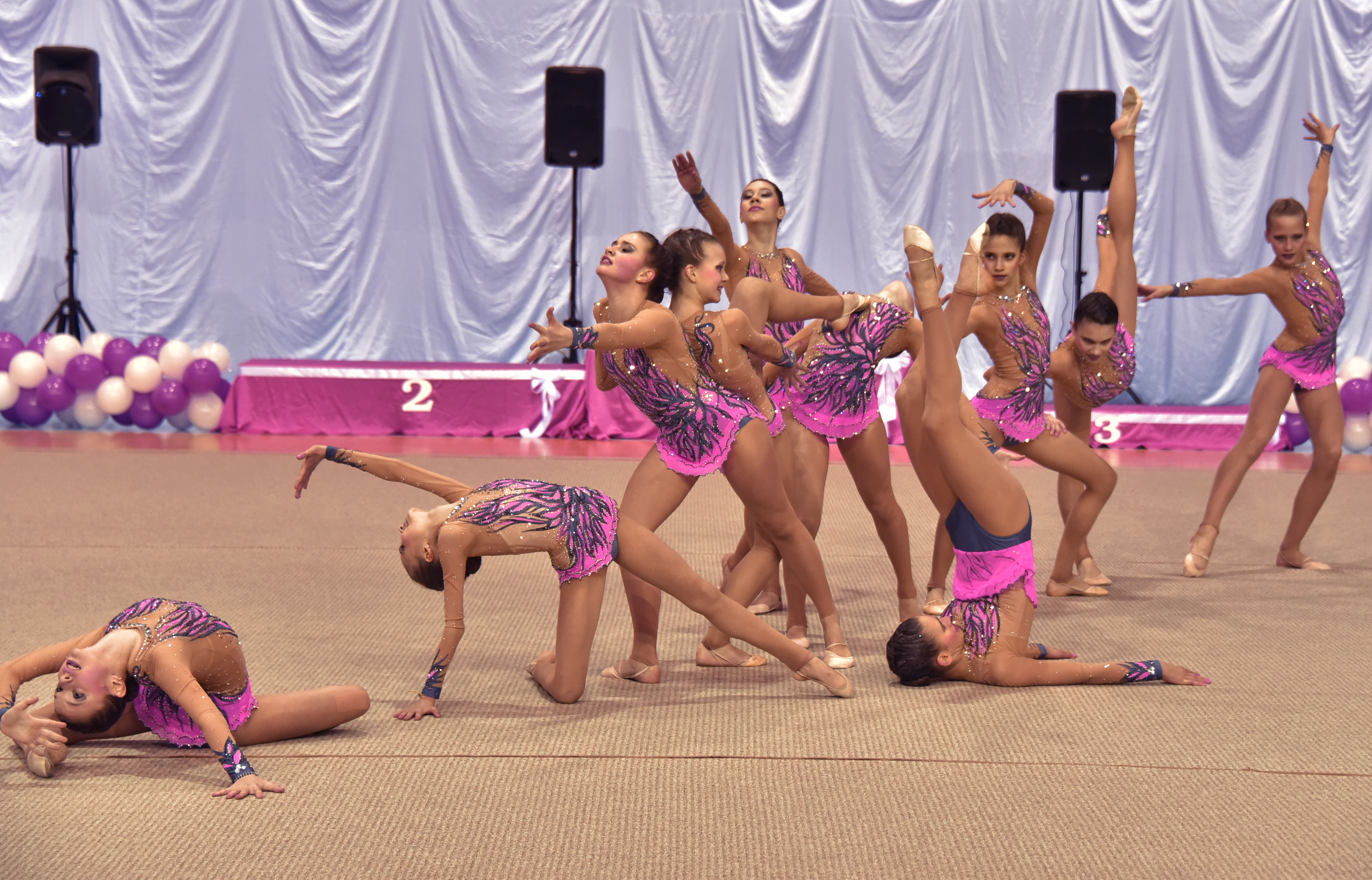
- An aesthetic group gymnastics team performing a routine
- Highest governing body: International Federation of Aesthetic Group Gymnastics (IFAGG)
- First contested: 2000 (Finland)

Characteristics
- Contact: Not with opponents
- Mixed-sex: yes
- Type: Gymnastic sport

Presence
- Country or region: Worldwide
- Olympic: No
- World Games: No

Aesthetic group gymnastics (AGG) is a discipline of gymnastics developed from Finnish "Women's Gymnastics" (naisvoimistelu). The discipline is reminiscent of rhythmic gymnastics, with some significant differences: in AGG, the emphasis is on big and continuous body movement, and the teams are larger. AGG teams often consist of 6-10 gymnasts, and some children’s teams are bigger. Furthermore, apparatus is not used in international AGG competitions as it is in rhythmic gymnastics where balls, ribbons, hoops and clubs are used on the floor area. The sport requires physical qualities such as flexibility, balance, speed, strength, coordination and sense of rhythm where movements of the body are emphasized in the flow and, expressive and aesthetic appeal. A good performance is characterized by uniformity and simultaneity. The competition program consists of versatile and varied body movements, such as body waves and swings, balances and pivots, jumps and leaps, dance steps, and lifts.

The length of the competition program should be 1.30 – 2.45 minutes depending on the category (short Program/long program).The competition dress of a group must be a leotard with aesthetic appeal considering the spirit of competitive sport. The size of the competition area, which is a gymnastics carpet, is 13 m × 13 m.

The International Federation of Aesthetic Group Gymnastics (IFAGG) was established in 2003. The Federation has amongst others Australia, Bulgaria, Canada, the Czech Republic, Denmark, Estonia, the Faroe Islands, Finland, France, Hungary, Italy, Japan, Russia, Ukraine and Spain as members.

== Age categories ==
In AGG, the teams compete in the following age categories:

- Children category 8–10 years
- Children category 10–12 years
- Children category 12–14 years
- Junior category: 14–16 years
- Senior category: over 16 years

In addition, there is a University students category where the gymnasts should be 17 years and over. It is only junior and senior gymnasts that compete in A-category international competitions, such as the World Championships.

== Judging ==
The jury is composed of three judge panels:

The technical jury will assess whether the program has all the required technical elements, which in AGG depends on the age group of the gymnasts, but which generally consists of:

- Balances: e.g., static balances, dynamic balances (e.g., tourlent, illusions, pivots), and balance series
- Jumps and leaps: e.g., tuck jump, scissor leap, cossack jump, ring jump with both legs bent, and stag leap
- Body movements: e.g., bending, body swing, body wave, contraction, lean / lunge, relaxation, and twisting
- Arm movements
- Series of steps, skips or hops
- Acrobatic movements
- Flexibility movements: e.g., front line and sideline splits
- Combined series

The artistic jury evaluates the gymnasts’ quality, the structure of the composition, and the originality and expression of the composition.

The executive jury makes deductions for mistakes they identify during the program. E.g., insufficient extensions, unfixed shapes in body movements, heavy landings in jumps, unfixed shapes in balances, lack of synchronization and even the smallest mistakes as not pointing your feet.

The highest total score is 20.00 points consisting of: Technical Value (TV) 6.0, Artistic Value (AV) 4.0, and Execution (EXE) 10.0.

== Aesthetic Group Gymnastics World Championships ==
The international competition system for AGG is organized into three categories. These are designated as A, B, and C. The A-category competitions include the World Championships, the Continental Championships, the World Cup competitions, the Challenge Cup competitions (for juniors), IFAGG Championships, and other approved championships. The B-category competitions include international children's or junior competitions. The C-category is reserved for national championships.

Aesthetic Group Gymnastics is a discipline not currently recognized by the Fédération Internationale de Gymnastique. World Championships are organized annually since 2000 by the International Federation of Aesthetic Group Gymnastics (IFAAG).

== Aesthetic Group Gymnastics European Championships ==
European Championships are organized annually since 2016 by the International Federation of Aesthetic Group Gymnastics (IFAAG). After 2018, it was decided they will be held on every two years. But after 2025, they were organized every year again.

== Aesthetic Group Gymnastics World Cup ==
World Cup is a series of competitions that are held throughout the year in the world. The World Cup series consists of four seasonal competitions held in different countries. There are two types, which are organised at the same time – World Cup is for senior teams and Challenge Cup is for junior teams. Teams receive points from each stage and best three results give the final ranking in World Cup series.

The winner of the first ever IFAGG World Cup, held in 2005, was SC Oscar from Russia, GC Piruett from Estonia was second and VVS Frida from Finland third.

== In Finland ==
AGG is a very popular sports among girls in Finland. The Finnish Gymnastics Federation is one of Finland's largest sport federations with 374 clubs consisting of approximately 130,000 members. The most popular gymnastics discipline in the country is AGG.

The Finnish teams have won many the world championships and have recently got second place in the world championships

Some popular companies that do the sport in Finland are: Vantaan voimisteluseura (VVS), Olarin voimisteliat (OVO), Attitude Sports, ScVantaa, and kirkkonummen urheiliat (kirku).

In Finland, the AGG follows the rules of the Finnish Gymnastics Federation. It is possible to compete on three different levels or series in AGG: the championship level, the competition level, and the hobby level. The championship series is the most high-level series, as teams in this series compete in the Finnish Championships. The teams can decide themselves in which series they want to compete but the Finnish Gymnastics Federation has put out recommendations that they prefer to be followed. Children younger than 12 years old all compete in the same series.

According to the rules of the Finnish Gymnastics Federation, in the spring teams compete with programs without apparatus and on the fall with programs including apparatus, which is dependent on the age category. Juniors and seniors in the championship series do not compete with apparatus. In the autumn competitions, the apparatus are the following:

Children's series	Championship series, Competition series, Hobby series
<10: Apparatus of own choice	12–14: Hoop	12–14: Rope / ball / hoop	12–14: Rope / ball / hoop
10–12: Rope (even years) Ball (uneven years)	14–16: No apparatus	14–16 : Rope / ball / hoop / clubs / ribbon	14–16:: Rope / ball / hoop / clubs / ribbon
	>16: No apparatus	16–20: Rope / ball / hoop / clubs / ribbon	>16: : Rope / ball / hoop / clubs / ribbon
		>18: Rope / ball / hoop / clubs / ribbon

The points are given in categories from 1 to 10 in the age categories of 10–12 and 12–14 (competition and hobby series). Teams that are placed in categories 1–2 get to know their points. Teams are put in categories according to the following points:

- category 1: 16.50 – 20.00
- category 2: 15.50 – 16.49
- category 3: 14.50 – 15.49
- category 4: 13.50 – 14.49
- category 5: 12.50 – 13.49
- category 6: 11.50 – 12.49
- category 7: 10.50 – 11.49
- category 8: 9.00 – 10.49
- category 9: 6.50 – 8.49
- category 10: 0 – 6.49
