= 1986 Trampoline World Championships =

The 14th Trampoline World Championships were held in Paris, France from 16 to 18 October 1986.

== Results ==
=== Men ===
==== Trampoline Individual ====
Rank	Country	Gymnast	Points
Gold medal	France	Lionel Pioline	107.10
Silver medal	West Germany	Michael Kuhn	104.70
Bronze medal	West Germany	Ralf Pelle	104.20
4	Soviet Union	Igor Galimbatoviski	104.00
5	Soviet Union	Dimitri Poliarush	100.60
6	Great Britain	Nigel Rendell	100.40
7	West Germany	Jorh Roh	100.10
8	Great Britain	Richard Cobbing	99.10

==== Trampoline Team ====
Rank	Country	Gymnasts	Points
Gold medal	West Germany	Michael Kuhn; Jorh Roh; Ralf Pelle; Karl Heinz Huninghake	195.30
Silver medal	Soviet Union	Sergrei Nestreliai; Dimitri Poliarush; Vadim Krasnochapka; Igor Galimbatoviski	194.30
Bronze medal	France	Laurent Mainfray; Lionel Pioline; Hubert Barthod; Daniel Pean	193.70
4	Great Britain	Nigel Rendell; Aaron Wake; Richard Cobbing; Ian Ross	186.90
5	Denmark	Michael Nielsen; John Hansen; Anders Christiansen; Kjeld Rosen	186.40

==== Trampoline Synchro ====
Rank	Country	Gymnasts	Points
Gold medal	Soviet Union	Vadim Krasnochapka; Igor Bogachev	72.1
Silver medal	France	Lionel Pioline; Daniel Pean	70.7
Bronze medal	Soviet Union	Sergrei Nestreliai; Igor Galimbatoviski	68.6
4	Denmark	Michael Nielsen; Kjeld Rosen	68.1
5	West Germany	Michael Kuhn; Ralf Pelle	63.3
6	Poland	Zdzislav Pelka; Wladermar Okoniewoski	62.4
7	Scotland	Alistair Fogg; Geoff Fogg	60.8
8	West Germany	Staude; Karl Heinz Huninghake	58.7

==== Double Mini Trampoline ====
Rank	Country	Gymnast	Points
Gold medal	Australia	Brett Austine	26.4
Silver medal	United States	Terry Butler	25.9
Bronze medal	United States	Chad Fox	25.7
4	West Germany	Christian Poliath	25.5
5	Australia	Adrian Wareham	25.3
6	West Germany	Thorsten Hartmann	25.0
7	United States	Karl Heger	24.6
8	West Germany	Olaf Schmidt	24.3

==== Double Mini Trampoline Team ====
Rank	Country	Gymnasts	Points
Gold medal	Australia	Brett Austine; Adrian Wareham; Steve Evetts; Tony Moxham	46.9
Silver medal	West Germany	Dieter Wozniak; Thorsten Hartmann; Olaf Schmidt; Christian Poliath	46.5
Bronze medal	United States	Chad Fox; Eric Colca; Terry Butler; Karl Heger	46.4
4	Canada	Darryl Scheelar; Stéphan Duchesne; Luke Waidman; Alain Duchesne	44.9
5	Portugal	Luis Baltazar; Jorge Moreira; Luis Nunes; Luis Santos	42.7

==== Tumbling ====
Rank	Country	Gymnast	Points
Gold medal	United States	Jerry Hardy	117.18
Silver medal	France	Didier Semmola	110.6
Bronze medal	Poland	Andrzej Gartska	110.02
4	France	Philippe Chapus	108.88
5	United States	Chad Fox	108.14
6	Canada	Darryl Scheelar	106.56
7	Poland	Skawomir Borejszo	105.68
8	France	Christophe Lambert	105.50

==== Tumbling Team ====
Rank	Country	Gymnasts	Points
Gold medal	United States	Jerry Hardy; Chad Fox; Kevin Ekberg; Nate Taylor	199.78
Silver medal	France	Didier Simmola; Christophe Lambert; Philippe Chapus; Pascal Eouzan	199.58
Bronze medal	Poland	Skawomir Borejszo; Andrzej Gartska; Krzysztof Wilousz; Zbigmiew Bachor	192.36
4	Canada	Darryl Scheelar; Sean McManus; John Smith	170.92
5	Portugal	Paulo Apricio; Camilo Colaco; Mario Colaco; Jorge Moreira	170.20

=== Women ===
==== Trampoline Individual ====
Rank	Country	Gymnast	Points
Gold medal	Soviet Union	Tatiana Lushina	97.3
Silver medal	Great Britain	Andrea Holmes	97.0
Silver medal	Soviet Union	Irena Slonova	97.0
4	Soviet Union	Lilia Ivanova	95.3
5	West Germany	Hiltrud Roewe	94.8
6	Soviet Union	Irena Bludova	94.5
7	West Germany	Beate Kruswicki	93.4
8	Australia	Elizabeth Jensen	93.1

==== Trampoline Team ====
Rank	Country	Gymnasts	Points
Gold medal	Soviet Union	Irena Bludova; Lilia Ivanova; Tatiana Lushina; Irena Slonova	183.7
Silver medal	Great Britain	Andrea Holmes; Sue Shotton; Sachelle Halford; Kyrstyan McDonald	179.2
Bronze medal	West Germany	Ute Oder; Hiltrud Roewe; Beate Kruswicki; Sussanne Rheinshmidt	177.6
4	Canada	Christine Tough; Vicky Bullock; Catherine Worley; Donna Tough	171.3
5	Netherlands	Diana Wong; Marjo Dierman-Koertman; Mariska V D Sman	169.9

==== Trampoline Synchro ====
Rank	Country	Gymnasts	Points
Gold medal	Soviet Union	Elena Merkulova; Tatiana Lushina	66.1
Silver medal	Soviet Union	Irena Bludova; Lilia Ivanova	64.0
Bronze medal	West Germany	Hiltrud Roewe; Bafke Spang	59.9
4	Great Britain	Andrea Holmes; Harries	59.7
5	Australia	Elizabeth Jensen; Newman	59.5
6	Japan	Reiko Handa; Miki Komatsu	57.1
7	Netherlands	Diana Wong; Mariska V D Sman	57.0
8	Great Britain	Susan Munro; Lorraine Tarbeth	56.9

==== Double Mini Trampoline ====
Rank	Country	Gymnast	Points
Gold medal	West Germany	Bettina Lehmann	24.0
Silver medal	Canada	Marie Andrée-Richard	23.4
Bronze medal	West Germany	Gabi Dreier	23.0
4	Portugal	Rita Vilasboas	22.8
5	Australia	Cherie Mathers	22.7
6	Canada	Vicki Bullock	22.50
7	West Germany	Heike Holthoff	22.40
8	United States	Tammi Cobbs	22.10

==== Double Mini Trampoline Team ====
Rank	Country	Gymnasts	Points
Gold medal	West Germany	Nicole Kruger; Heike Holthoff; Bettina Lehmann; Gabi Dreier	42.4
Silver medal	Canada	Marie Andrée-Richard; Vicki Bullock; Christine Tough; Donna Tough	41.3
Bronze medal	Australia	Lisa Newman-Morris; Liz Jensen; Natalie Abreu	40.7
4	United States	Sami Dow; Tiffany Johnson; Michelle Church; Sharon Peterson	40.1
5	Portugal	Ruta Vilasboas; Maria Baptista; Isabel Figueiredo; Teresa Moutinho	38.6

==== Tumbling ====
Rank	Country	Gymnast	Points
Gold medal	United States	Jill Hollembeak	111.96
Silver medal	France	Sandrine Vacher	106.98
Bronze medal	France	Isabelle Jagueux	106.44

==== Tumbling Team ====
Rank	Country	Gymnasts	Points
Gold medal	United States		185.17
Silver medal	France	Sandrine Vacher, Isabelle Jagueux, Corinne Robert, Surya Bonaly	184.52
Bronze medal	Poland		173.90
