= Frank Schmitz =

American trampoline gymnast

- Full name: Frank K. Schmitz
- Born: September 4, 1945
- Died: September 3, 1966 (aged 20) Morgan City, Louisiana, U.S.

Gymnastics career
- Country represented: United States
- College team: Southern Illinois Salukis (1964–1966)
- Retired: 1966
Medal record
Men's trampoline gymnastics
Representing United States
World Championships
Silver medal – second place	1965 London	Individual
South African Games
Gold medal – first place	1964 Johannesburg	Individual

Frank K. Schmitz (September 4, 1945 – September 3, 1966) was an American trampoline gymnast who won four individual NCAA titles and a silver medal at the 1965 Trampoline World Championships.

== Early life ==
Schmitz was the son of William C. and Polly Schmitz and was raised in Lafayette, Louisiana. He had several accidents as a child. As a baby, Frank's stroller rolled off the front porch of his house. As a boy, he found a live bullet that he put in a toy gun. The bullet exploded and part of it lodged in his liver. As a teenager, Schmitz was involved in a motor scooter accident. A head injury from the accident caused his head to swell to one and a half times its normal size. After Schmitz recovered, his parents pushed him away from contact sports, so he became interested in gymnastics.

== High school ==
After taking up gymnastics he studied under Jeff Hennessy at the University of Southwestern Louisiana while he was in high school. In 1962, he won the AAU trampoline national championship. He came in second in Trampolining at the same event in 1963.

While still in high school, Schmitz won the U.S. Invitational Championship in trampoline, floor exercise, and vaulting in 1962. In 1963 and 1964, he won the East-West Trampoline Championship. He also attended the 1964 inaugural South African Games where he won the trampoline championship.

== College ==
He began attending college at Southern Illinois University Carbondale where he was a member of Sigma Pi fraternity. While at SIU he won four individual NCAA national championships. In 1965, he won the Floor Exercise as well as the Trampoline championships In 1966, he was again the Floor Exercise champion as well as the Long Horse (Vault) champion. In 1966, the SIU Salukis were also the NCAA team champion in men's gymnastics.

Schmitz won a silver medal at the 1965 Trampoline World Championships in London.

== Death ==
Schmitz was killed when the plane he was piloting crashed near Morgan City, Louisiana on the night before his twenty-first birthday. At the time of his death he was rated one of the best trampolinists in the world. He was also known for being able to perform the full and one-and-a-half twisting dive roll on the floor exercise and the full twisting front vault on the Long Horse.

After his death, he was inducted into the SIU Athletic Hall of Fame.
