= 1984 Trampoline World Championships =

The 13th Trampoline World Championships were held in Osaka, Japan from August 24 to August 26, 1984.

== Results ==
=== Men ===
==== Trampoline Individual ====
Rank	Country	Gymnast	Points
Gold medal	France	Lionel Pioline	102.70
Silver medal	Soviet Union	Igor Bogachev	101.90
Bronze medal	Soviet Union	Igor Galimbatoviski	101.20
4	Great Britain	Nigel Rendell	99.00
5	Japan	Kenji Iwamoto	98.80
6	France	Laurent Mainfray	99.90
7	West Germany	Michael Kuhn	98.50
8	Australia	Glenn Kelly	84.50

==== Trampoline Team ====
Rank	Country	Gymnasts	Points
Gold medal	Soviet Union	Sergrei Nestreliai; Igor Bogachev; Vadim Krasnochapka; Igor Galimbatoviski	197.40
Silver medal	Australia	Glenn Kelly; John Merritt; Adrian Wareham; Brett Austine	187.90
Bronze medal	France	Laurent Mainfray; Lionel Pioline; Hubert Barthod; Daniel Pean	187.50
4	Great Britain	Nigel Rendell; Stewart Matthews; Richard Cobbing philip Seaman	186.20
5	West Germany	Michael Kuhn; Robert Schwebel; Ralf Pelle; Amadeus Regenbrecht	185.50

==== Trampoline Synchro ====
Rank	Country	Gymnasts	Points
Gold medal	Soviet Union	Vadim Krasnochapka; Igor Bogachev	72.80
Silver medal	Soviet Union	Igor Gelimbatovski; Sergei Nestreliai	71.80
Bronze medal	France	Daniel Pean; Lionel Pioline	70.20
4	West Germany	Michael Kuhn; Ralf Pelle	69.80
5	France	Laurent Mainfray; Denis Passemard	66.80
6	Japan	Kenji Iwamoto; Takuya Fukui	66.50
7	Poland	Zdzislaw Pelka; Waldemar Okoniewski	65.50
8	France	Laurent Mainfray; Denis Passemard	64.50

==== Double Mini Trampoline ====
Rank	Country	Gymnast	Points
Gold medal	Australia	Brett Austine	26.2
Silver medal	Australia	John Merritt	25.3
Bronze medal	United States	Steve Elliott	25.0
4	United States	Karl Heger	24.5
5=	Australia	Stephen Evetts	24.3
5=	West Germany	Christian Poliath	24.3
7=	West Germany	Thorsten Hartmann	23.6
7=	Spain	Julio Garvía	23.6

==== Double Mini Trampoline Team ====
Rank	Country	Gymnasts	Points
Gold medal	Australia	Brett Austine; Adrian Wareham; Stephen Evetts; John Merritt	45.9
Silver medal	United States	Kevin Ekbarg; Steve Elliott; Terry Butler; Karl Heger	42.8
Bronze medal	West Germany	Lutz Graske; Thorsten Hartmann; Christian Poliath; Manfred Schwedler	42.5
4=	Spain	Angel Ballesteros; Cruz Blanco; Julio Garvía; José Vives	41.5
4=	Canada	Stéphan Duchesne; Tim Cleave; Alain Duchesne; Darryl Scheelar	41.5

==== Tumbling ====
Rank	Country	Gymnast	Points
Gold medal	United States	Steve Eiliott	61.75
Silver medal	United States	Kevin Ekberg	61.72
Bronze medal	Poland	Andrzej Gartska	58.45
4	Poland	Skawomir Borejszo	55.00
5	United States	Chuck Myers	54.65
6	Australia	Michael Whittaker	53.85
7	France	Didier Semmola	53.80
8	Canada	Darryl Scheelar	53.10
8	Canada	Dave Bens	53.10

==== Tumbling Team ====
Rank	Country	Gymnasts	Points
Gold medal	United States	Steve Eiliott; Chad Fox; Kevin Ekberg; Chuck Myers	103.37
Silver medal	Poland	Skawomir Borejszo; Andrzej Gartska; Marek Krol	97.2
Bronze medal	Canada	Darryl Scheelar; Stéphan Duchesne; John Smith; Dave Bens	91.5

=== Women ===
==== Trampoline Individual ====
Rank	Country	Gymnast	Points
Gold medal	Great Britain	Sue Shotton	96.80
Silver medal	Switzerland	Ruth Schumann	95.90
Bronze medal	Soviet Union	Lilia Ivanova	95.00

==== Trampoline Team ====
Rank	Country	Points
Gold medal	Great Britain	181.70
Silver medal	West Germany	175.60
Bronze medal	Australia	174.30

==== Trampoline Synchro ====
Rank	Country	Gymnasts	Points
Gold medal	Great Britain	Kyrstyan McDonald; Sue Shotton	66.60
Silver medal	Netherlands	Jacqueline de Ruiter; Marjo van Diermen	65.40
Bronze medal	Great Britain	Andrea Holmes; Sachele Halford	60.70

==== Double Mini Trampoline ====
Rank	Country	Gymnast	Points
Gold medal	West Germany	Gabi Dreier	23.50
Silver medal	Australia	Cherie Mathers	23.30
Bronze medal	Australia	Lesley Stephens	22.60
Bronze medal	Canada	Vicki Bullock	22.60

==== Double Mini Trampoline Team ====
Rank	Country	Points
Gold medal	Australia	41.50
Silver medal	West Germany	41.00
Bronze medal	Canada	39.00

==== Tumbling ====
Rank	Country	Gymnast	Points
Gold medal	United States	Jill Hollembeak	65.00
Silver medal	United States	Terri Devries	59.75
Bronze medal	United States	Megan Cunningham	58.25

==== Tumbling Team ====
Rank	Country	Points
Gold medal	United States	104.30
Silver medal	Canada	94.50
Bronze medal	Australia	79.68

== Medal table ==
Rank	Nation	Gold	Silver	Bronze	Total
1	United States	4	3	2	9
2	Australia	3	3	3	9
3	Great Britain	3	0	1	4
4	Soviet Union	2	2	2	6
5	West Germany	1	2	1	4
6	France	1	0	2	3
7	Canada	0	1	3	4
8	Poland	0	1	1	2
9	Netherlands	0	1	0	1
9	Switzerland	0	1	0	1
Totals (10 entries)		14	14	15	43
