= 1982 Trampoline World Championships =

The 12th Trampoline World Championships were held in Bozeman, Montana, United States on May 13–15, 1982.

== Results ==
=== Men ===
==== Trampoline ====
Rank	Country	Gymnast	Points
Gold medal	Great Britain	Carl Furrer	107.30
Silver medal	Australia	Glenn Kelly	102.00
Bronze medal	Canada	John Ross	101.80

==== Trampoline Team ====
Rank	Country	Points
Gold medal	France	191.20
Silver medal	Great Britain	188.70
Bronze medal	Spain	188.30

==== Trampoline Synchro ====
Rank	Country	Gymnasts	Points
Gold medal	United States	Mark Calderon; Stuart Ransom	62.6
Silver medal	Scotland	Geoff Fog; Alistair McCann	56.17
Bronze medal	Switzerland	Jorg Roth; Bernard Stadelmann	55.30

==== Double Mini Trampoline ====
Rank	Country	Gymnast	Points
Gold medal	Australia	Brett Austine	26.80
Silver medal	South Africa	Derrick Lotz	26.1
Bronze medal	West Germany	Manfred Schwedler	25.80

==== Double Mini Trampoline Team ====
Rank	Country	Points
Gold medal	Australia	44.80
Silver medal	United States	42.80
Bronze medal	Canada	42.30

==== Tumbling ====
Rank	Country	Gymnast	Points
Gold medal	United States	Steve Elliott	62.22
Silver medal	United States	Tim Schlosser	60.30
Bronze medal	United States	Ed Meadows	56.55

==== Tumbling Team ====
Rank	Country	Points
Gold medal	United States	103.02
Silver medal	Canada	88.10
Bronze medal	South Africa	87.30

=== Women ===
==== Trampoline ====
Rank	Country	Gymnast	Points
Gold medal	Switzerland	Ruth Keller	100.00
Silver medal	West Germany	Susanne Hauser	97.70
Bronze medal	Great Britain	Sue Shotton	96.80

==== Trampoline Team ====
Rank	Country	Points
Gold medal	West Germany	183.30
Silver medal	Great Britain	180.2
Bronze medal	Netherlands	174.80

==== Trampoline Synchro ====
Rank	Country	Gymnasts	Points
Gold medal	Netherlands	Jacqueline de Ruiter; Marjo van Diermen	64.50
Silver medal	West Germany	Ute Scheile; Ute Luxon	63.10
Bronze medal	France	Nadine Conte; Nathalie Treil	62.50

==== Double Mini Trampoline ====
Rank	Country	Gymnast	Points
Gold medal	Canada	Christine Tough	24.30
Silver medal	West Germany	Gabi Dreier	24.1
Bronze medal	United States	Bethany Fairchild	23.70

==== Double Mini Trampoline Team ====
Rank	Country	Points
Gold medal	United States	41.20
Silver medal	Australia	40.50
Bronze medal	New Zealand	39.70

==== Tumbling ====
Rank	Country	Gymnast	Points
Gold medal	United States	Jill Hollembeck	61.15
Silver medal	United States	Kristi Laman	57.55
Bronze medal	United States	Stacy Hansen	57.21

==== Tumbling Team ====
Rank	Country	Points
Gold medal	United States	101.08
Silver medal	Canada	83.47
Bronze medal	South Africa	73.98

== Medal table ==
Rank	Nation	Gold	Silver	Bronze	Total
1	United States	6	3	3	12
2	Australia	2	2	0	4
3	West Germany	1	3	1	5
4	Canada	1	2	2	5
5	Great Britain	1	2	1	4
6	France	1	0	1	2
6	Netherlands	1	0	1	2
6	Switzerland	1	0	1	2
9	South Africa	0	1	2	3
10	Scotland	0	1	0	1
11	New Zealand	0	0	1	1
11	Spain	0	0	1	1
Totals (12 entries)		14	14	14	42
