= 1978 Trampoline World Championships =

1978 world trampoline competition

The 10th Trampoline World Championships were held in Newcastle, Australia, on 5–7 October 1978.

== Results ==
=== Men ===
==== Trampoline ====
Rank	Country	Gymnast	Points
Gold medal	Soviet Union	Yevgeny Janes	76.30
Silver medal	Great Britain	Stewart Matthews	75.80
Bronze medal	Soviet Union	Vladimir Zhadoev	73.80

==== Trampoline Synchro ====
Rank	Country	Gymnasts	Points
Gold medal	Soviet Union	Vladimir Zhadoev; Yevgeny Janes	45.00
Silver medal	Switzerland	Jorg Roth; Gerhard Gass	39.90
Bronze medal	Great Britain	Stewart Matthews; Carl Furrer	38.20

==== Double Mini Trampoline ====
Rank	Country	Gymnast	Points
Gold medal	United States	Stuart Ransom	25.90
Silver medal	Australia	Brett Austine	25.30
Bronze medal	United States	Don Zasadny	24.70

==== Tumbling ====
Rank	Country	Gymnast	Points
Gold medal	United States	Jim Bertz	58.85
Silver medal	United States	Mack Gillian	53.65
Bronze medal	Australia	Alan Wing	48.85

=== Women ===
==== Trampoline ====
Rank	Country	Gymnast	Points
Gold medal	Soviet Union	Tatiana Anisimova	71.10
Silver medal	Soviet Union	Victoria Belyayeva	70.70
Bronze medal	Soviet Union	Tatiana Palluck	70.00

==== Trampoline Synchro ====
Rank	Country	Gymnasts	Points
Gold medal	West Germany	Ute Scheile; Ute Luxon	41.20
Silver medal	Soviet Union	Tatiana Anisimova; Victoria Belyayeva	41.10
Bronze medal	Switzerland	Ruth Keller; Edith Zaugg	37.10

==== Double Mini Trampoline ====
Rank	Country	Gymnast	Points
Gold medal	United States	Leigh Hennessy	22.90
Silver medal	Canada	Norma Lehto	21.80
Bronze medal	United States	Bethany Fairchild	21.40

==== Tumbling ====
Rank	Country	Gymnast	Points
Gold medal	United States	Nancy Quattrochi	58.85
Silver medal	United States	Lori Davison	53.65
Bronze medal	Australia	Alison McHugh	52.15

== Medal table ==
Rank	Nation	Gold	Silver	Bronze	Total
1	United States	4	2	2	8
2	Soviet Union	3	2	2	7
3	West Germany	1	0	0	1
4	Australia	0	1	2	3
5	Great Britain	0	1	1	2
5	Switzerland	0	1	1	2
7	Canada	0	1	0	1
Totals (7 entries)		8	8	8	24
