= Rusudan Khoperia =

Georgian trampoline gymnast

- Born: September 9, 1972 (age 53)

Gymnastics career
- Discipline: Trampoline gymnastics
- Country represented: Georgia
- Former countries represented: Soviet Union
Medal record
Women's trampoline gymnastics
Representing the Soviet Union
World Championships
Gold medal – first place	1988 Birmingham	Individual
Gold medal – first place	1988 Birmingham	Synchro
Gold medal – first place	1988 Birmingham	Team

Rusudan Khoperia (born September 9, 1972) is a Georgian trampoline gymnast who represented Georgia at two Olympic Games (2000 and 2004), and with the former USSR at the 1988 Trampoline World Championships. She won 3 World gold medals: two with the Soviet team as an individual and as a team member, and one in the synchro event with Elena Kolomeets.
