= 1974 Trampoline World Championships =

The 8th Trampoline World Championships were held in Johannesburg, South Africa on 23 March 1974.

== Results ==
=== Men ===
==== Trampoline ====
Rank	Country	Gymnast	Points
Gold medal	France	Richard Tison	71.10
Silver medal	United States	Stormy Eaton	71.00
Bronze medal	Australia	Peter Hurle	70.00

==== Trampoline Synchro ====
Rank	Country	Gymnasts	Points
Gold medal	United States	Bob Neely; Jim Cartledge	39.91
Silver medal	West Germany	Robert Schwebel; Werner Friedrich	38.50
Bronze medal	South Africa	Derick Lotz; Stephen Pelser	37.70

=== Women ===
==== Trampoline ====
Rank	Country	Gymnast	Points
Gold medal	United States	Alexandra Nicholson	72.1
Silver medal	United States	Marilyn Steig	71.30
Bronze medal	South Africa	Jennifer Liebenberg	70.90

==== Trampoline Synchro ====
Rank	Country	Gymnasts	Points
Gold medal	West Germany	Ute Scheile; Petra Wenzel	39.68
Silver medal	United States	Marilyn Steig; Julie Johnson	36.58
Bronze medal	South Africa	Jennifer Liebenberg; Stephanie Smith	36.33

== Medal table ==
Rank	Nation	Gold	Silver	Bronze	Total
1	United States	2	3	0	5
2	West Germany	1	1	0	2
3	France	1	0	0	1
4	South Africa	0	0	3	3
5	Australia	0	0	1	1
Totals (5 entries)		4	4	4	12
