= Judy Wills Cline =

American trampoline gymnast

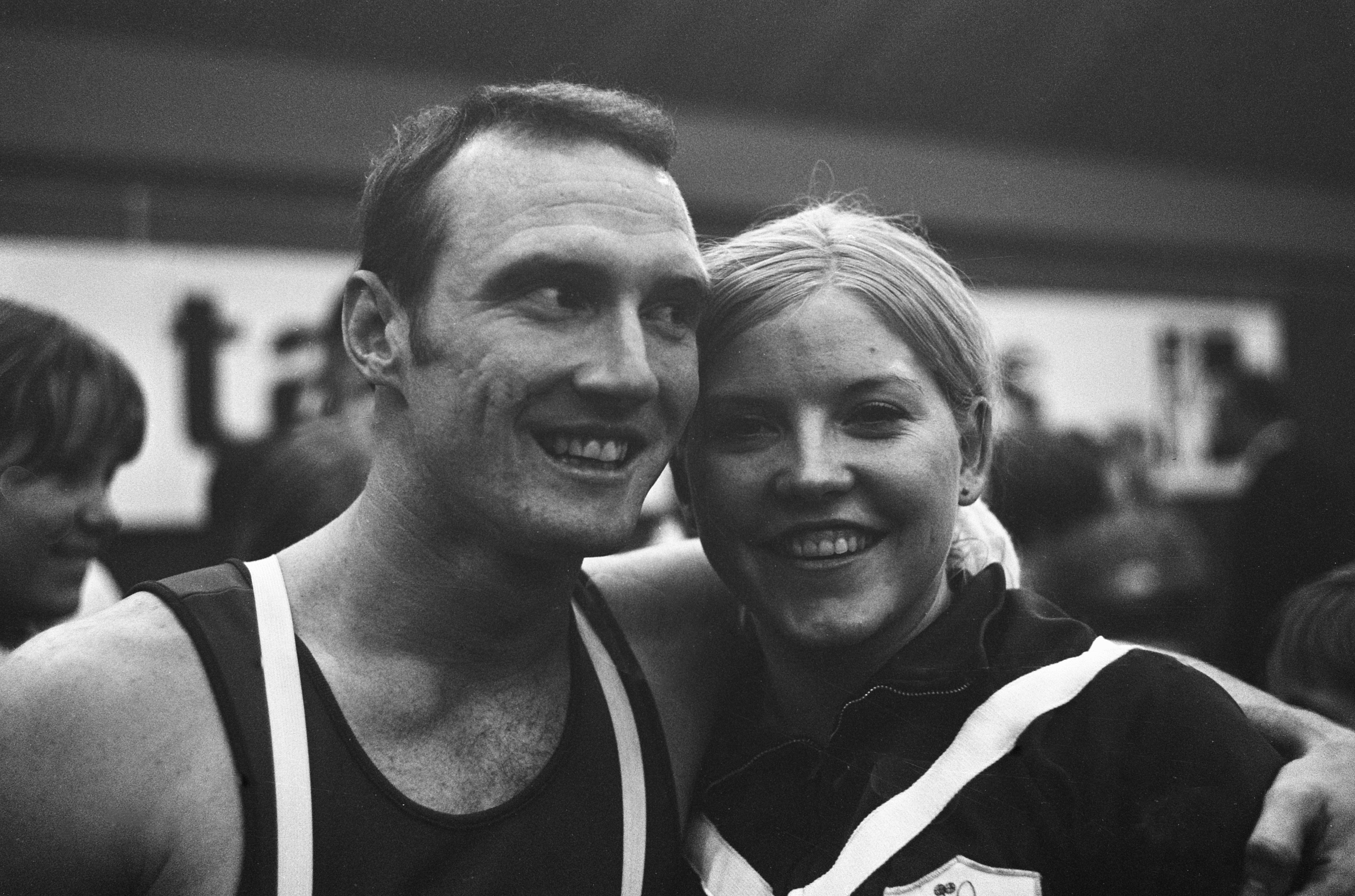
- David Jacobs and Wills in 1968

Personal information
- Full name: Judy Wills
- Born: 1948 (age 77–78)

Sport
- Sport: Trampoline
Medal record
Women's trampoline gymnastics
Representing the United States
World Championships
Gold medal – first place	1964 London	Trampoline, individual
Gold medal – first place	1965 London	Trampoline, individual
Gold medal – first place	1965 London	Tumbling
Gold medal – first place	1966 Tulsa	Synchronized trampoline
Gold medal – first place	1966 Tulsa	Trampoline, individual
Gold medal – first place	1966 Tulsa	Tumbling
Gold medal – first place	1967 London	Synchronized trampoline
Gold medal – first place	1967 London	Trampoline, individual
Gold medal – first place	1968 Amersfoort	Trampoline, individual

Judy Wills Cline (born 1948) is a retired American trampoline gymnast and acrobat. Between 1964 and 1968, she won ten world titles in the trampoline, synchronized trampoline, and tumbling. She was the first world champion in these events and the only athlete to win the world championships in both trampoline and tumbling. She is listed in the Guinness Book of Records for winning most world individual titles in trampoline (5); and for performing most bounding whips (26), bounding fulls (16) and bounding double-fulls (8), all accomplished on a firm floor. She won 38 national titles in the trampoline, tumbling, vault, and floor exercise. In 1993, she was inducted to the U.S. Gymnastics Hall of Fame.

After retirement from competitions, she was head coach of the U.S. trampoline and tumbling teams at several world championships and world cups. Between 1998 and 2000, she acted as National Coaching Coordinator for the Trampoline and Tumbling Program. She worked as a coach in Las Vegas for at least 27 years. She is married to Jerry Cline. They have a son Michael, a gymnast studying at the United States Air Force Academy.
