= 1970 Trampoline World Championships =

The 6th Trampoline World Championships were held in Bern, Switzerland on 19 June 1970.

== Results ==
=== Men ===
==== Trampoline ====
Rank	Country	Gymnast	Points
Gold medal	United States	Wayne Miller	46.85
Silver medal	United States	George Huntzicher	46.6
Bronze medal	United States	Dale Hardt	46.55
4	South Africa	Vivian Breedt	44.05
5	West Germany	Michael Budenberg	43.7
6	West Germany	Didier Schulz	43.5
7	Switzerland	Kurt Hohener	43.2
8	South Africa	Bernard Cross	42.45

==== Trampoline Synchro ====
Rank	Country	Gymnasts	Points
Gold medal	United States	Gary Smith; Don Waters	23.45
Silver medal	South Africa	Vivian Breedt; Spenser Wiggins	23.30
Bronze medal	Switzerland	Victor Pircher; Kurt Hohener	19.55
4	Netherlands	Jan van der Zwaard; Rien De Ruiter	19.5
5	Great Britain	David Curtis; Michael Williams	19.35
6	West Germany	Petter Latton; Michael Budenberg	17.75

=== Women ===
==== Trampoline ====
Rank	Country	Gymnast	Points
Gold medal	United States	Rennee Ransom	41.2
Silver medal	West Germany	Ute Czech	40.90
Bronze medal	South Africa	Jennifer Liebenberg	40.65
4	United States	Troy Kauffmann	40.30
5	South Africa	Lucia Odendaal	40.05
6	West Germany	Agathe Jarosch	40.00
7	Great Britain	Jane Pullen	39.65
8	United States	Mary McDonald	39.60

==== Trampoline Synchro ====
Rank	Country	Gymnasts	Points
Gold medal	South Africa	Linda Dinkelmann; Charlene V D Merve	21.30
Silver medal	United States	Lucy Clauter; Diane Haney	20.15
Bronze medal	Great Britain	Pat Lewis; Janet Yates	18.8
4	West Germany	Maria Jarosch; Ute Czech	17.3

== Medal table ==
Rank	Nation	Gold	Silver	Bronze	Total
1	United States	3	2	1	6
2	South Africa	1	1	1	3
3	West Germany	0	1	0	1
4	Great Britain	0	0	1	1
4	Switzerland	0	0	1	1
Totals (5 entries)		4	4	4	12
