= 1972 Trampoline World Championships =

The 7th Trampoline World Championships were held in Stuttgart, West Germany on 23 September 1972.

== Results ==
=== Men ===
==== Trampoline ====
Rank	Country	Gymnast	Points
Gold medal	Great Britain	Paul Luxon	48.85
Silver medal	United States	Gary Smith	48.5
Bronze medal	United States	Chris Ellertsen	47.8
4	South Africa	Spenser Wiggins	46.75
5	Great Britain	Robert Hughes	45.5
=6	West Germany	Heinz Schulze	45.2
=6	Australia	Ric Virgin	45.2
8	West Germany	Kurt Schmidt	45.05

==== Trampoline Synchro ====
Rank	Country	Gymnasts	Points
Gold medal	Great Britain	Paul Luxon; Robert Hughes	26.10
Silver medal	United States	Gary Smith; Don Waters	26.05
Bronze medal	West Germany	Inge Trudrung; Kurt Schmidt	25.60

=== Women ===
==== Trampoline ====
Rank	Country	Gymnast	Points
Gold medal	United States	Alexandra Nicholson	46.85
Silver medal	West Germany	Christiana Rother	42.60
Bronze medal	United States	Merilin Stieg	42.35

==== Trampoline Synchro ====
Rank	Country	Gymnasts	Points
Gold medal	United States	Marilyn Steig; Bobby Grant	24.00
Silver medal	South Africa	Jennifer Liebenberg; Charlene van der Merve	23.55
Bronze medal	West Germany	Katrin Dinkler; Kletzko	21.80

== Medal table ==
Rank	Nation	Gold	Silver	Bronze	Total
1	United States	2	2	2	6
2	Great Britain	2	0	0	2
3	West Germany	0	1	2	3
4	South Africa	0	1	0	1
Totals (4 entries)		4	4	4	12
