= 1964 Trampoline World Championships =

The 1st Trampoline World Championships were held in Royal Albert Hall, London, England on 21 March 1964. The competition was on knock out basis, with 10 jumps each in a routine and 5–7 judges involved in the judging. The competition attracted twelve countries from around the globe.

== Medal summary ==
Event	Gold	Silver	Bronze
Men
Individual	Dan Millman (USA)	Gary Erwin (USA)	Dave Smith (ENG)
Women
Individual	Judy Wills (USA)	Lynda Ball (ENG)	Karle van der Bogard (RSA)

== Results ==
=== Men's trampoline ===
Rank	Country	Gymnast
Gold medal	United States	Dan Millman
Silver medal	United States	Gary Erwin
Bronze medal	England	Dave Smith

=== Women's trampoline ===
Rank	Country	Gymnast
Gold medal	United States	Judy Wills
Silver medal	England	Lynda Ball
Bronze medal	South Africa	Karle van der Bogard

== Medal table ==
Rank	Nation	Gold	Silver	Bronze	Total
1	United States	2	1	0	3
2	England	0	1	1	2
3	South Africa	0	0	1	1
Totals (3 entries)		2	2	2	6
