= Mark Robson (American writer) =

American writer

Mark B. Robson is a Scottish-born American writer, playwright, theatre actor, theatre director, and former professor. He lives in Lafayette, Louisiana.

== Biography ==
During his years at the University of Louisiana at Lafayette, Robson played soccer and coached the men's soccer team to its first conference championship (Louisiana Regional Soccer League). Robson holds a Ph.D. in English Literature from the University of Louisiana at Lafayette (formerly known as the University of Southwestern Louisiana), received in 1984 under Paul T. Nolan. His thesis was titled, Henry Fielding: the playwright.

He was assistant professor of English and Theater at Graceland University in Iowa.

He was the Director of the Eavesdrop Theater in Lafayette, Louisiana in 1984. As a playwright, director, and actor, he was involved in dozens of productions in Louisiana, and across the United States. Several of his one-act plays were performed in an Off-Off Broadway theater in New York (1984), including “Home at Last," which won the playwriting award at the Deep South Writers Conference. He also directed and acted in Off-Off Broadway plays in New York.

In addition to his work in theater, Robson is a numismatist in United States coins and stamps. He has written extensively about all aspects of coins and stamps, and from 2000 to 2003 he was a guest host on ShopNBC television coin shows, under the name of “Dr. Mark.”

In 2008, Robson and Leigh Hennessy married at the Birse Kirk church in Birse, located in the Scottish Highlands.

== Publications ==
- Honore, Russel L. (2017). Angers, Trent (ed.). Don't Get Stuck on Stupid!: Leadership in Action. Mark B. Robson (contributor), Leigh Hennessy Robson (contributor). Acadian House Publishing. ISBN 978-0999588413.
- Hennessy, Jefferson; Hennessy Robson, Leigh; Robson, Mark B. (2017). The Day of the Cajundome Mega-Shelter. Acadian House Publishing. ISBN 978-0-925417-95-4.
