= David Jacobs (gymnast) =

American trampoline gymnast (born 1946)

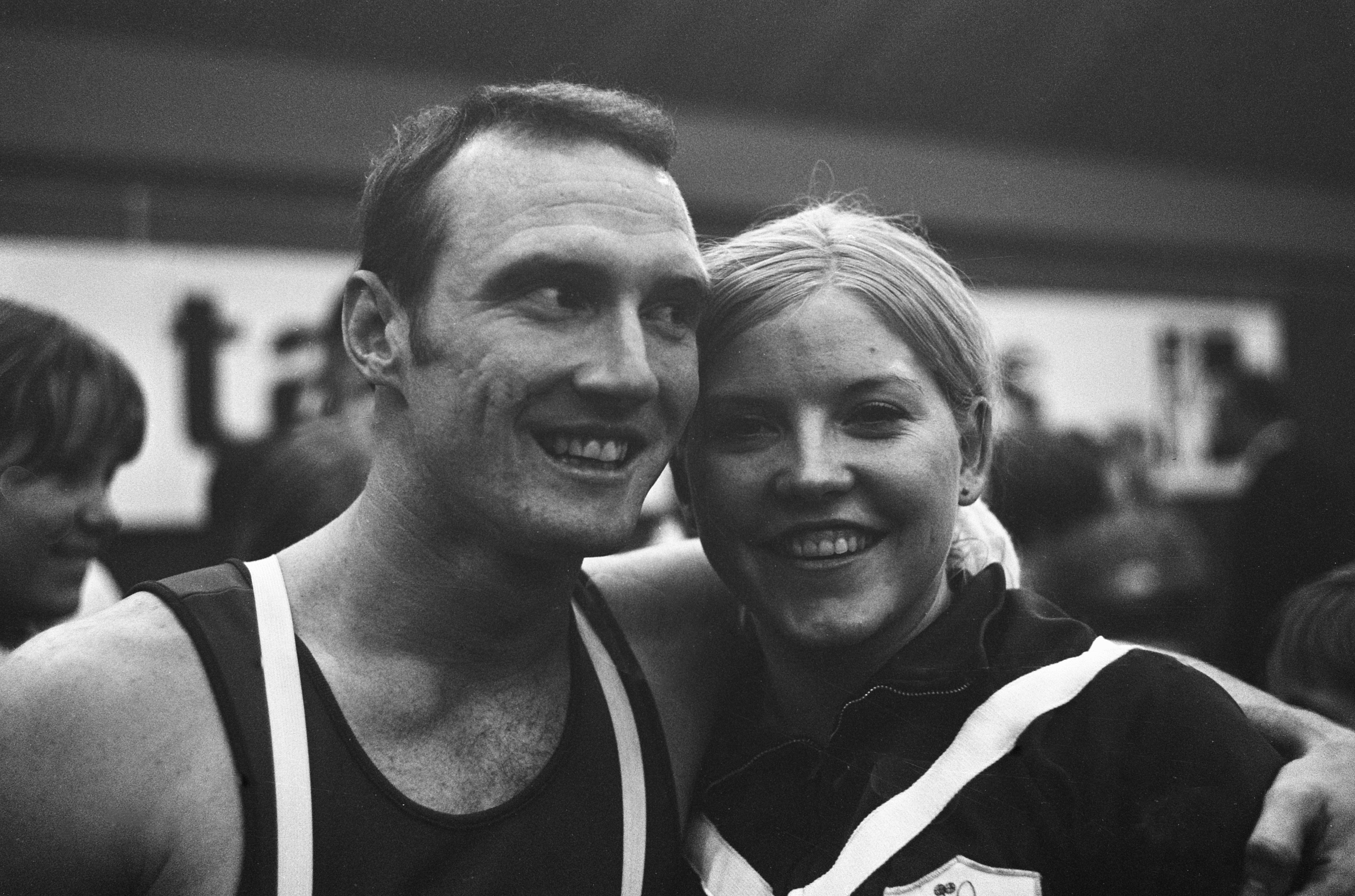
- Jacobs and Judy Wills Cline in 1968

Personal information
- Full name: David Arthur Jacobs
- Born: 1946 (age 79–80) Sheboygan, Wisconsin, US
- Height: 5 ft 8 in (173 cm)

Gymnastics career
- Discipline: Trampoline gymnastics
- Country represented: United States
Medal record
Men's trampoline gymnastics
Representing the United States
World Championships
Gold medal – first place	1966 Lafayette	Synchro
Gold medal – first place	1967 London	Individual
Gold medal – first place	1968 Amersfoort	Individual
Silver medal – second place	1966 Lafayette	Tumbling

David Arthur Jacobs (born 1946) is an American trampoline and artistic gymnast. He is a three-time Trampoline Gymnastics World Championships gold medalist and the NCAA men's gymnastics champion on the floor exercise (1967) and trampoline (1967 and 1969).

He was inducted into the World Acrobatics Society (WAS) Hall of Fame in 2009 and later served as the president from 2015 to 2019. In September 2024, Jacobs received the Charlie Pond Service Award from the WAS.

== Early life and education ==
Jacobs was born in 1946 in Sheboygan, Wisconsin, to Careta (née Aschenbach). The family moved to Amarillo, Texas, in 1957, and moved back to Sheboygan in 1965. In 1962 while a sophomore in high school, he joined Nard's trampoline club in Texas. Jacobs was a student at the University of Michigan.

== Gymnastics career ==
In 1964, he competed at the Amateur Athletic Union (AAU) championships and finished third. While there, he began a working relationship with Eddie Cole. At the 1966 Trampoline World Championships (TWC), he won the synchronized trampoline title with fellow Michigan student Wayne Miller.

While Jacobs was at the University of Michigan, he competed for the Michigan Wolverines men's gymnastics team from 1967 to 1969. He was the NCAA champion in the floor exercise and trampoline at the 1967 NCAA gymnastics championships. He won a further NCAA title for trampoline in 1969 en route to being a finalist for the Nissen-Emery Award.

== Personal life ==
Jacobs was the father of David Jacobs, who created one of the largest steroid and growth hormone operations in the United States and led to "...one of the largest trafficking investigations of its kind in the nation's history..." Authorities determined Jacobs' son was the perpetrator of a murder–suicide discovered on June 5, 2008.
