= 1965 Trampoline World Championships =

Trampoline competition

The 2nd Trampoline World Championships were held in Albert Hall, London, England on 30 January 1965.

== Medal summary ==
| Event | Gold | Silver | Bronze |
|---|---|---|---|
Men
| Individual | Gary Erwin (USA) | Frank Schmitz (USA) | Wayne Miller (USA) |
| Tumbling | Frank Schmitz (USA) | Jimmy Wilson (ENG) | Barry Benn (ENG); Peter Davies (WAL) |
Women
| Individual | Judy Wills (USA) | Beverly Averyt (USA) | Nancy Smith (USA) |
| Tumbling | Judy Wills (USA) | Barbara Galleger (USA) | Beverly Averyt (USA) |
Mixed
| Synchro | United States; Gary Erwin; Frank Schmitz | West Germany; Helga Flohl; Michael Budenberg | England; Lynda Ball; Barbara John |

== Results ==
=== Men ===
==== Trampoline ====
| Rank | Country | Gymnast |
|---|---|---|
| Gold medal | United States | Gary Erwin |
| Silver medal | United States | Frank Schmitz |
| Bronze medal | United States | Wayne Miller |

==== Tumbling ====
| Rank | Country | Gymnast |
|---|---|---|
| Gold medal | United States | Frank Schmitz |
| Silver medal | England | Jimmy Wilson |
| Bronze medal | England | Barry Benn |
| Bronze medal | Wales | Peter Davies |

=== Women ===
==== Trampoline ====
| Rank | Country | Gymnast |
|---|---|---|
| Gold medal | United States | Judy Wills |
| Silver medal | United States | Beverly Averyt |
| Bronze medal | United States | Nancy Smith |

==== Tumbling ====
| Rank | Country | Gymnast |
|---|---|---|
| Gold medal | United States | Judy Wills |
| Silver medal | United States | Barbara Galleger |
| Bronze medal | United States | Beverly Averyt |

=== Mixed synchro trampoline ===
| Rank | Country | Gymnast |
|---|---|---|
| Gold medal | United States | Gary Erwin; Frank Schmitz |
| Silver medal | West Germany | Helga Flohl; Michael Budenberg |
| Bronze medal | England | Lynda Ball; Barbara John |

== Medal table ==
| Rank | Nation | Gold | Silver | Bronze | Total |
|---|---|---|---|---|---|
| 1 | United States | 5 | 3 | 3 | 11 |
| 2 | England | 0 | 1 | 2 | 3 |
| 3 | West Germany | 0 | 1 | 0 | 1 |
| 4 | Wales | 0 | 0 | 1 | 1 |
| Totals (4 entries) | | 5 | 5 | 6 | 16 |
