= 1967 Trampoline World Championships =

The 4th Trampoline World Championships were held in Crystal Palace London, England on 17 June 1967.

== Results ==
=== Men ===
==== Trampoline ====
Rank	Country	Gymnast	Points
Gold medal	United States	David Jacobs	46.70
Silver medal	Great Britain	David Curtis	44.10
Bronze medal	Great Britain	Michael Williams	43.70
4	West Germany	Kurt Keitzer	42.95
5	West Germany	Hartmut Riehle	42.85
6	South Africa	Ron Abbott	41.85
7	South Africa	Ian McNaughton	41.10
8	United States	Jimmy Yongue	39.95

==== Trampoline Synchro ====
Rank	Country	Gymnasts	Points
Gold medal	West Germany	Kurt Treiter; Hartmut Riehle	14.70
Silver medal	Switzerland	Kurt Hohener; Rolf Maurer	14.3
Bronze medal	South Africa	Ian McNaughton; Ron Abbott	13.25
4	United States	Jimmy Yongue; David Jacobs	6.4

=== Women ===
==== Trampoline ====
Rank	Country	Gymnast	Points
Gold medal	United States	Judy Wills	44.7
Silver medal	United States	Nancy Smith	41.3
Bronze medal	South Africa	Charlene Paletz	40.5
4	West Germany	Ute Czech	38.7
5	Great Britain	Sue Vine	38.6
6	Great Britain	Wendy Coulton	38.1
7	West Germany	Agathe Jarosch	37.45
8	South Africa	Linda Dinkelmann	24.2

==== Trampoline Synchro ====
Rank	Country	Gymnasts	Points
Gold medal	United States	Nancy Smith; Judy Wills	15.25
Silver medal	West Germany	Maria Jarosch; Ute Czech	13.6
Bronze medal	Great Britain	Wendy Coulton; Sue Vine	12.7
4	South Africa	Charlene Paletz; Linda Dinkelmann	12.55

== Medal table ==
Rank	Nation	Gold	Silver	Bronze	Total
1	United States	3	1	0	4
2	West Germany	1	1	0	2
3	Great Britain	0	1	2	3
4	Switzerland	0	1	0	1
5	South Africa	0	0	2	2
Totals (5 entries)		4	4	4	12
