= 1988 Trampoline World Championships =

The 15th Trampoline World Championships were held in Birmingham (Alabama), United States from May 10 to May 12, 1988

== Results ==
=== Men ===
==== Trampoline Individual ====
Rank	Country	Gymnast	Points
Gold medal	Soviet Union	Vadim Krasnochapka	105.10
Silver medal	Soviet Union	Dmitri Poliaroush	104.90
Bronze medal	Soviet Union	Igor Bogachev	104.20
4	Soviet Union	Sergrei Nestreliai	102.80
5	West Germany	Michael Kuhn	101.10
6	Denmark	John Hansen	99.90
7	France	Hubert Barthod	99.50
8	Poland	Zdzislaw Pelka	99.30

==== Trampoline Team ====
Rank	Country	Gymnasts	Points
Gold medal	Soviet Union	Sergrei Nestreliai; Igor Bogachev; Vadim Krasnochapka; Dmitri Poliaroush	197.70
Silver medal	West Germany	Michael Kuhn; Angel Ballesteros; Ralf Pelle; Frank Staude	189.50
Bronze medal	Poland	Waldemar Okoniesky; Eligiusz Skoszylas; Zdzislaw Pelka	185.80
4	Denmark	John Hansen; Kjeld Rosén; Anders Christiansen	184.70
5	Great Britain	Tony Harrison; Theo Kypri; Richard Cobbing; Ian Mallon	183.90

==== Trampoline Synchro ====
Rank	Country	Gymnasts
Gold medal	Soviet Union	Vadim Krasnochapka; Igor Bogachev
Silver medal	Soviet Union	Igor Gelimbatovski; Sergei Nestreliai
Bronze medal	France	Hubert Barthod; Lionel Pioline
4	Poland	Zdzislaw Pelka; Waldemar Okoniewski
5	France	Laurent Mainfray; Denis Passemard
6	Netherlands	Frits Widenhoff; Bert Dammers
7	Scotland	Geoffrey Fogg; Alistair Fogg
8	United States	Karl Heger; Terry Butler

==== Double Mini Trampoline ====
Rank	Country	Gymnast
Gold medal	Australia	Adrian Wareham
Silver medal	United States	Terry Butler
Bronze medal	Australia	Brett Austine
4	United States	Jon Beck
5	United States	Karl Heger
6	West Germany	Frank Deutschmann
7	Portugal	Jorge Moreira
8	Spain	José Miguel Hernandez

==== Double Mini Trampoline Team ====
Rank	Country	Gymnasts
Gold medal	United States	Tim Bilicic; Jon Beck; Terry Butler; Karl Heger
Silver medal	Australia	Brett Austine; Adrian Wareham; Darren Gillis; Tony Moxham
Bronze medal	Portugal	Joao Ferreira; Jorge Moreira; Luis Nunes; Jorge Pereira
4	West Germany	Dieter Wozniak; Thorsten Hartmann; Frank Deutschmann; Manfred Schwedler
5	Spain	Angel Ballesteros; Alfonso Gines; Javier Sosa; José Miguel Hernandez

==== Tumbling ====
Rank	Country	Gymnast
Gold medal	France	Pascal Eouzan
Silver medal	France	Didier Semmola
Bronze medal	Poland	Krzysztof Wilusz

==== Tumbling Team ====
Rank	Country	Gymnasts
Gold medal	France	
Silver medal	Poland	
Bronze medal	United States	

=== Women ===
==== Trampoline Individual ====
Rank	Country	Gymnast
Gold medal	Soviet Union	Rusudan Khoperia
Silver medal	Great Britain	Andrea Holmes
Bronze medal	Soviet Union	Elena Merkulova
4	Great Britain	Sue Challis
5	Soviet Union	Elena Kolomeets
6	West Germany	Hiltrud Roewe
7	West Germany	Sandra Siwinna
8	Great Britain	Sachelle Halford

==== Trampoline Team ====
Rank	Country	Gymnasts
Gold medal	Soviet Union	Rusudan Khoperia; Elena Kolomeets; Tatiana Lushina; Elena Merkulova
Silver medal	Great Britain	Andrea Holmes; Sue Challis; Sachelle Halford; Kyrstyan McDonald
Bronze medal	West Germany	Ute Oder; Hiltrud Roewe; Sandra Siwinna; Gabi Bahr
4	Japan	Naoko Nagata; Reiko Handa; Miki Komatsuo; Akiko Furu
5	Australia	Lisa Newman-Morris; Gina Drew; Natalie Abrev; Liz Jensen

==== Trampoline Synchro ====
Rank	Country	Gymnasts
Gold medal	Soviet Union	Elena Kolomeets; Rusudan Khoperia
Silver medal	Great Britain	Andrea Holmes; Sachelle Halford
Bronze medal	Soviet Union	Elena Merkulova; Tatiana Lushina
4	Great Britain	Sue Challis; Kyrstyan McDonald
5	West Germany	Ute Oder; Yvonne Kraft
6	Australia	Liz Jensen; Lisa Newman-Morris
7	West Germany	Hiltrud Roewe; Bafke Spang
8	Japan	Naoko Nagata; Araki

==== Double Mini Trampoline ====
Rank	Country	Gymnast
Gold medal	Australia	Liz Jensen
Silver medal	Australia	Lisa Newman-Morris
Bronze medal	West Germany	Gabi Bahr
4=	New Zealand	Alana Boulton
4=	Canada	Marie Andrée-Richard
6	New Zealand	Kylie Walker
7	Belgium	Sofie Van de Plassche
8	United States	Sami Dow

==== Double Mini Trampoline Team ====
Rank	Country	Gymnasts
Gold medal	Australia	Lisa Newman-Morris; Liz Jensen; Natalie Abreu
Silver medal	New Zealand	Kylie Walker; Alana Boulton; Tracy Bathgate; Kristen Glover
Bronze medal	United States	Sami Dow; Tiffany Johnson; Michelle Church; Sharon Peterson
4	Canada	Marie Andrée-Richard; Kirsten Coke; Cindy Webster; Patricia Meadows
5	West Germany	Nicole Kruger; Heike Holthoff; Bettina Lehmann; Gabi Dreier

==== Tumbling ====
Rank	Country	Gymnast
Gold medal	United States	Megan Cunningham
Silver medal	United States	Toni Ovelletto
Bronze medal	Poland	Malgorzata Poplawska

==== Tumbling Team ====
Rank	Country	Gymnasts
Gold medal	United States	
Silver medal	France	
Bronze medal	Belgium	
