= 1968 Trampoline World Championships =

The 5th Trampoline World Championships were held in Amersfoort, Netherlands on 30 November 1968.

== Results ==
=== Men ===
==== Trampoline ====
| Rank | Country | Gymnast | Points |
|---|---|---|---|
| Gold medal | United States | David Jacobs | 45.55 |
| Silver medal | Great Britain | David Curtis | 42.15 |
| Bronze medal | West Germany | Michael Budenberg | 42.05 |
| 4 | Switzerland | Kurt Hohener | 41.85 |
| 5 | West Germany | Klaus Forster | 41.65 |
| 6 | South Africa | Vivian Breedt | 41.45 |
| 7 | Great Britain | Thomas Cunnings | 40.25 |
| 8 | Australia | Paul Howlett | 38.55 |

==== Trampoline Synchro ====
| Rank | Country | Gymnasts | Points |
|---|---|---|---|
| Gold medal | West Germany | Klaus Forster; Michael Budenberg | 15.45 |
| Silver medal | Great Britain | David Curtis; Michael Williams | 14.45 |
| Bronze medal | United States | Jimmy Yongue; Don Waters | 14.00 |
| 4 | Netherlands | Jan van der Zwaard; Rien De Ruiter | 12.7 |
| 5 | South Africa | Vivian Breedt; Spenser Wiggins | 10.35 |
| 6 | Denmark | Prter Kjogx; Jan Schwartz | 10.05 |
| 7 | Switzerland | Victor Pircher; Kurt Hohener | 13.25 |

=== Women ===
==== Trampoline ====
| Rank | Country | Gymnast | Points |
|---|---|---|---|
| Gold medal | United States | Judy Wills | 41.6 |
| Silver medal | United States | Vivi Bollinger | 39.4 |
| Bronze medal | South Africa | Jennifer Liebenberg | 38.05 |
| 4 | Great Britain | Diane Bullen | 37.85 |
| 5 | South Africa | Linda Dinkelmann | 37.15 |
| 6 | West Germany | Agathe Jarosch | 36.75 |
| 7 | Netherlands | Ria Vink | 31.65 |
| 8 | West Germany | Ute Czech | 31.15 |

==== Trampoline Synchro ====
| Rank | Country | Gymnasts | Points |
|---|---|---|---|
| Gold medal | West Germany | Maria Jarosch; Ute Czech | 13.05 |
| Silver medal | Great Britain | Jane Pullen; Diane Bullen | 12.75 |
| Bronze medal | South Africa | Linda Dinkelmann; Charlene V D Merve | 12.7 |
| 4 | Netherlands | Belt; Yvonne Vorges | 10.25 |
| 5 | Denmark | Eva Jorgensen; Mette Keinorop | 9.2 |
| 6 | United States | Vivi Bollinger; Judy Wills | 7.55 |

== Medal table ==
| Rank | Nation | Gold | Silver | Bronze | Total |
|---|---|---|---|---|---|
| 1 | United States | 2 | 1 | 1 | 4 |
| 2 | West Germany | 2 | 0 | 1 | 3 |
| 3 | Great Britain | 0 | 3 | 0 | 3 |
| 4 | South Africa | 0 | 0 | 2 | 2 |
| Totals (4 entries) | | 4 | 4 | 4 | 12 |
