= 1980 Trampoline World Championships =

The 11th Trampoline World Championships were held in Brig, Switzerland on 27 September 1980.

== Results ==
=== Men ===
==== Trampoline ====
| Rank | Country | Gymnast | Points |
|---|---|---|---|
| Gold medal | Great Britain | Stewart Matthews | 79.70 |
| Silver medal | Great Britain | Carl Furrer | 76.40 |
| Bronze medal | West Germany | Ralf Pelle | 76.30 |

==== Trampoline Synchro ====
| Rank | Country | Gymnasts | Points |
|---|---|---|---|
| Gold medal | Great Britain | Carl Furrer; Stewart Matthews | 45.10 |
| Silver medal | France | Daniel Pean; Lionel Pioline | 44.80 |
| Bronze medal | Japan | Masahito Matsumoto; Masaki Iwashita | 42.40 |

==== Double Mini Trampoline ====
| Rank | Country | Gymnast | Points |
|---|---|---|---|
| Gold medal | South Africa | Derrick Lotz | 25.20 |
| Silver medal | West Germany | Manfred Schwedler | 23.60 |
| Bronze medal | Australia | Brett Austine | 23.30 |
| Bronze medal | Australia | Stephen Evetts | 23.30 |

==== Tumbling ====
| Rank | Country | Gymnast | Points |
|---|---|---|---|
| Gold medal | United States | Kevin Ekberg | 66.50 |
| Silver medal | United States | Steve Elliott | 66.05 |
| Bronze medal | United States | Dickle Rivens | 62.85 |

=== Women ===
==== Trampoline ====
| Rank | Country | Gymnast | Points |
|---|---|---|---|
| Gold medal | Switzerland | Ruth Keller | 71.60 |
| Silver medal | West Germany | Ute Scheile | 71.30 |
| Bronze medal | Great Britain | Erika Phelps | 69.60 |

==== Trampoline Synchro ====
| Rank | Country | Gymnasts | Points |
|---|---|---|---|
| Gold medal | West Germany | Beate Kruswicki; Gabrielle Bahr | 39.80 |
| Silver medal | Netherlands | Jacqueline de Ruiter; Marjo van Diermen | 38.80 |
| Bronze medal | Canada | Christine Tough; Norma Lehto | 38.20 |

==== Double Mini Trampoline ====
| Rank | Country | Gymnast | Points |
|---|---|---|---|
| Gold medal | United States | Bethany Fairchild | 22.10 |
| Silver medal | Canada | Norma Lehto | 22.00 |
| Bronze medal | South Africa | Charlene Geyser | 20.70 |

==== Tumbling ====
| Rank | Country | Gymnast | Points |
|---|---|---|---|
| Gold medal | United States | Tracy Conour | 62.35 |
| Silver medal | United States | Kristi Laman | 61.25 |
| Bronze medal | United States | Julie Beatty | 59.55 |

== Medal table ==
| Rank | Nation | Gold | Silver | Bronze | Total |
|---|---|---|---|---|---|
| 1 | United States | 3 | 2 | 2 | 7 |
| 2 | Great Britain | 2 | 1 | 1 | 4 |
| 3 | West Germany | 1 | 2 | 1 | 4 |
| 4 | South Africa | 1 | 0 | 1 | 2 |
| 5 | Switzerland | 1 | 0 | 0 | 1 |
| 6 | Canada | 0 | 1 | 1 | 2 |
| 7 | France | 0 | 1 | 0 | 1 |
| 7 | Netherlands | 0 | 1 | 0 | 1 |
| 9 | Australia | 0 | 0 | 2 | 2 |
| 10 | Japan | 0 | 0 | 1 | 1 |
| Totals (10 entries) | | 8 | 8 | 9 | 25 |
