= Jeff Hennessy =

American trampolining coach

- Born: Jefferson Thomas Hennessy; October 27, 1929; Ancón, Panama
- Died: March 24, 2015 (aged 85); Lafayette, Louisiana, U.S.
- Education: Northwestern State University
- Occupation: University of Southwestern Louisiana (1959–1986)
- Known for: United States trampolining team coach (1964–1980)
- Children: 3, including Leigh Hennessy

Jefferson Thomas Hennessy Sr. (October 27, 1929 – March 24, 2015) was a Panamanian-born American trampoline coach and physical educator.

Hennessy was an Associate Professor of Physical Education at University of Louisiana at Lafayette from 1959 to 1986, served as the director of the University’s gymnastics and trampoline programs and he was the United States trampolining coach from 1964 to 1980.

In total, his athletes were awarded 26 world championship medals and numerous national and regional titles and medals.

== Biography ==
Hennessy was born in Ancón, Panama, where he lived with his family until the age of 12, before they emigrated to Monroe, Louisiana, United States. He graduated with a bachelor's degree from Northwestern State University.

Hennessy was an Associate Professor of Physical Education at the University of Louisiana at Lafayette in Lafayette, Louisiana (then named the University of Southwestern Louisiana) from 1959 to 1986, as well as the director of the university's gymnastics and trampoline programs. As a coach, he led the U.S. team to World Championships in the 1964, 1965, 1967, 1968, 1970, 1972, 1974, 1978, and 1980. He was also the U.S. team coach for the Ennia Gold Cup Championships in the Netherlands in 1981, as well as tours of South Africa in 1969, 1974, 1979, and 1981; the Soviet Union in 1974 (first U.S. team to complete in the Soviet Union) and 1977; and Germany in 1974. The University of Southwestern Louisiana gymnastics team was undefeated in 1960 and 1961. The trampoline team was National AAU Trampoline Team Champions from 1964 to 1975 and from 1979 to 1981, and was National Association of Intercollegiate Athletics (NAIA) National Trampoline Team Champions in 1969.

Among the most accomplished of Hennessy's athletes were his daughter and world champion Leigh Hennessy, world champion and 1984 Olympic diving medalist Ron Merriott, world champion Stuart Ransom, national champion and 1969 Miss America Judith Ford, world champion Jim Yongue, world champion Don Waters, world champion Gary Smith (gymnast), world champion Wayne Miller, and four time NCAA champion Frank Schmitz.

Hennessy died on March 24, 2015, from a lengthy undisclosed illness. He was 85.

== Achievements and awards ==
- World Acrobatics Society Legends Hall of Fame, 2005
- “Jeff T. Hennessy Trampoline and Tumbling Scholarship" established by USA Gymnastics, 2003
- Federation International Gymnastics (FIG) Honorary Member, 1999
- USA Gymnastics Hall of Fame, 1996
- International Gymnastics Hall of Fame, 1992
- International Trampoline Federation Lifetime Membership Award, 1984
- American Trampoline and Tumbling Association Outstanding Coach of the Year, 1982
- University of Southwestern Louisiana Distinguished Professor, 1982
- U.S. Trampoline Association Hall of Fame 1976
- Jeff Hennessy Day by Mayoral proclamation in Lafayette, Louisiana, 1974
- Amateur Athletic Union Outstanding Coach of the Year, 1970 and 1972
- Member of the United States Olympic Committee for Gymnastics, 1965-1969
- United States delegate for the Amateur Athletic Union to Winston Churchill's funeral, 1965
- Professional consultant for United States Diving Inc. on trampoline safety and skill performance, ABC Television, CBS Television, United States Department of Justice on trampoline safety, United States Gymnastics Safety Association, International Trampoline Federation, and USA Trampoline and Tumbling on safety and coaching techniques.

== Books ==
- The Trampoline As I See It (International Publications of Lafayette, 1969)
- Trampolining (William C Brown, 1968)
- A Successful Guidebook of Twisting Single and Multiple Somersaults (2007)
