= 1966 Trampoline World Championships =

The 3rd Trampoline World Championships were held in Lafayette, Louisiana, United States from April 29 to April 30, 1966.

== Medal summary ==
Event	Gold	Silver	Bronze
Men
Individual	Wayne Miller (USA)	Spenser Wiggins (RSA)	Michael Budenburg (FRG)
Synchro	United States; David Jacobs; Wayne Miller	South Africa; Ian McNaughton; Spenser Wiggins	West Germany; Dieter Schultz; Michael Budenburg
Tumbling	Frank Fortier (USA)	David Jacobs (USA)	Richards Wadsworth (USA)
Women
Individual	Judy Wills (USA)	Nancy Smith (USA)	Sue Warns (RSA)
Synchro	United States; Nancy Smith; Judy Wills	West Germany; Maria Jarosch; Helga Flohl	South Africa; Chariott Parietz; Sue Warns
Tumbling	Judy Wills (USA)	Donna Schaenzer (USA)	Susan McDowell (RSA)

== Results ==
=== Men ===
==== Trampoline ====
Rank	Country	Gymnast	Point
Gold medal	United States	Wayne Miller	46.70
Silver medal	South Africa	Spenser Wiggins	43.80
Bronze medal	West Germany	Michael Budenburg	43.70
4	South Africa	Ian McNaughton	43.55
5	United States	David Jacobs	42.70
6	Australia	Billy Popiwenko	40.20
7	West Germany	Dieter Schultz	40.05
8	Canada	Rick Kinsman	39.6

==== Trampoline Synchro ====
Rank	Country	Gymnast	Point
Gold medal	United States	David Jacobs; Wayne Miller	15.10
Silver medal	South Africa	Ian McNaughton; Spenser Wiggins	13.45
Bronze medal	West Germany	Dieter Schultz; Michael Budenburg	12.75
4	Canada	Rick Kinsman; Wayne King	12.05
5	Great Britain	Clive Brigden; David Curtis	11.95

==== Tumbling ====
Rank	Country	Gymnast	Point
Gold medal	United States	Frank Fortier	8.55
Silver medal	United States	David Jacobs	8.40
Bronze medal	United States	Richards Wadsworth	7.85
4	United States	Bill Bottrof	7.85
5	Canada	Rick Kinsman	7.75

=== Women ===
==== Trampoline ====
Rank	Country	Gymnast	Point
Gold medal	United States	Judy Wills	43.15
Silver medal	United States	Nancy Smith	42.10
Bronze medal	South Africa	Sue Warns	39.65
4	Great Britain	Lynda Ball	39.55
5	West Germany	Helga Flohl	38.90
6	West Germany	Maria Jarosch	38.15
7	South Africa	Charlene Paletz	37.5
8	Great Britain	Wendy Coulton	37.45

==== Trampoline Synchro ====
Rank	Country	Gymnast	Point
Gold medal	United States	Nancy Smith; Judy Wills	14.90
Silver medal	West Germany	Maria Jarosch; Helga Flohl	13.05
Bronze medal	South Africa	Chariott Parietz; Sue Warns	12.4
4	Great Britain	Wendy Coulton; Lynda Ball	12.00

==== Tumbling ====
Rank	Country	Gymnast	Point
Gold medal	United States	Judy Wills	8.85
Silver medal	United States	Donna Schaenzer	8.45
Bronze medal	South Africa	Susan McDowell	7.60
4	United States	Paula Crist	7.35
5	Canada	Irene Hawroth	6.40
6	United States	Lilly Strekfus	6.15
7	United States	Joey Indovena	5.65

== Medal table ==
Rank	Nation	Gold	Silver	Bronze	Total
1	United States	6	3	1	10
2	South Africa	0	2	3	5
3	West Germany	0	1	2	3
Totals (3 entries)		6	6	6	18
