= Trampoline Gymnastics World Championships =

Gymnastics competition

- Status: active
- Genre: sporting event
- Date: mid-year
- Frequency: annual
- Country: varying
- Inaugurated: 1964

The Trampoline Gymnastics World Championships are the world championships for trampoline gymnastics including double mini trampoline and tumbling. They were originally held annually from 1964–1968. The frequency was switched to biennially from 1970–1998. The admission of trampolining to the Olympic Games required a switch to holding the World Championship as a qualifier in the year before the Olympics from 1999. Since 2010, the World Championships are again held annually, except for Olympic years. This cycle was broken in 2021 when the COVID-19 pandemic forced the delay of the 2020 Summer Olympics by one year.

== Championships ==
=== Senior ===
Year	Edition	Host city	Country	Men's champion (Individual Trampoline)	Women's champion (Individual Trampoline)	Events	First in the Medal Table	Second in the Medal Table	Third in the Medal Table
1964	1	London	Great Britain	(United States) Dan Millman	(United States) Judy Wills	2	United States	Great Britain ^{[a]}	South Africa
1965	2	London	Great Britain	(United States) Gary Erwin	(United States) Judy Wills	5	United States	Great Britain ^{[a]}	West Germany
1966	3	Lafayette	United States	(United States) Wayne Miller	(United States) Judy Wills	6	United States	South Africa	West Germany
1967	4	London	Great Britain	(United States) David Jacobs	(United States) Judy Wills	4	United States	West Germany	Great Britain
1968	5	Amersfoort	Netherlands	(United States) David Jacobs	(United States) Judy Wills	4	United States	West Germany	Great Britain
1970	6	Bern	Switzerland	(United States) Wayne Miller	(United States) Renee Ransom	4	United States	South Africa	West Germany
1972	7	Stuttgart	West Germany	(United Kingdom) Paul Luxon	(United States) Alexandra Nicholson	4	United States	Great Britain	West Germany
1974	8	Johannesburg	South Africa	(France) Richard Tison	(United States) Alexandra Nicholson	4	United States	West Germany	France
1976	9	Tulsa	United States	(Soviet Union) Evgeni Janes & (France) Richard Tison	(Soviet Union) Svetlana Levina	8	United States	Soviet Union	France
1978	10	Newcastle	Australia	(Soviet Union) Evgeni Janes	(Soviet Union) Tatiana Anismova	8	United States	Soviet Union	West Germany
1980	11	Brig	Switzerland	(United Kingdom) Stewart Matthews	(Switzerland) Ruth Keller	8	United States	Great Britain	West Germany
1982	12	Bozeman	United States	(United Kingdom) Carl Furrer	(Switzerland) Ruth Keller	14	United States	Australia	West Germany
1984	13	Osaka	Japan	(France) Lionel Pioline	(United Kingdom) Susan Shotton	14	United States	Australia	Great Britain
1986	14	Paris	France	(France) Lionel Pioline	(Soviet Union) Tatyana Lushina	14	Soviet Union	United States	West Germany
1988	15	Birmingham, Alabama	United States	(Soviet Union) Vadim Krasnoshapka	(Soviet Union) Rusudan Khoperia	14	Soviet Union	United States	Australia
1990	16	Essen	West Germany	(Soviet Union) Alexander Moskalenko	(Soviet Union) Yelena Merkulova	14	Soviet Union	France	Australia
1992	17	Auckland	New Zealand	(Russia) Alexander Moskalenko	(Russia) Yelena Merkulova	14	Russia	United States	France
1994	18	Porto	Portugal	(Russia) Alexander Moskalenko	(Russia) Irina Karavayeva	14	Russia	United States	France
1996	19	Vancouver	Canada	(Belarus) Dmitri Poliaroush	(Russia) Tatyana Kovaleva	14	United States	France	Russia
1998	20	Sydney	Australia	(Russia) German Khnytchev	(Russia) Irina Karavayeva	14	Russia	New Zealand	France
1999	21	Sun City	South Africa	(Russia) Alexander Moskalenko	(Russia) Irina Karavayeva	14	Russia	Canada	Ukraine
2001	22	Odense	Denmark	(Russia) Alexander Moskalenko	(Germany) Anna Dogonadze	14	Russia	Ukraine	Portugal
2003	23	Hannover	Germany	(Germany) Henrik Stehlik	(Canada) Karen Cockburn	14	Russia	Canada	Great Britain
2005	24	Eindhoven	Netherlands	(Russia) Alexander Rusakov	(Russia) Irina Karavayeva	14	Russia	China	Portugal
2007	25	Quebec	Canada	(China) Ye Shuai	(Russia) Irina Karavayeva	14	Russia	China	Canada
2009	26	Saint Petersburg	Russia	(China) Dong Dong	(China) Huang Shanshan	14	China	Russia	Portugal
2010	27	Metz	France	(China) Dong Dong	(China) Li Dan	8	China	Russia	Canada
2011	28	Birmingham	Great Britain	(China) Lu Chunlong	(China) He Wenna	14	China	Canada	Russia
2013	29	Sofia	Bulgaria	(China) Dong Dong	(Canada) Rosie MacLennan	14	China	Great Britain	United States
2014	30	Daytona Beach	United States	(China) Tu Xiao	(China) Liu Lingling	8	China	Russia	United States
2015	31	Odense	Denmark	(China) Gao Lei	(China) Li Dan	14	China	Russia	United States
2017	32	Sofia	Bulgaria	(China) Gao Lei	(Belarus) Tatsiana Piatrenia	14	China	Russia	Belarus
2018	33	Saint Petersburg	Russia	(China) Gao Lei	(Canada) Rosie MacLennan	9	China	Russia	Canada
2019	34	Tokyo	Japan	(China) Gao Lei	(Japan) Hikaru Mori	15	Russia	Japan	Great Britain
2021	35	Baku	Azerbaijan	(China) Yan Langyu	(United Kingdom) Bryony Page	15	RGF ^{[c]}	China	Great Britain
2022	36	Sofia	Bulgaria	(New Zealand) Dylan Schmidt	(Japan) Hikaru Mori	15	Great Britain	Australia	Japan
2023	37	Birmingham	Great Britain	(China) Yan Langyu	(United Kingdom) Bryony Page	15	United States	Great Britain	China
2025	38	Pamplona	Spain	(China) Wang Zisai	(China) Hu Yicheng	16	China	United States	Japan
2026	39	Nanjing	China	(Belarus) Ivan Litvinovich	(China) Zhu Xueying	16	Russia	Belarus	China
2027	40	Sofia	Bulgaria	Future event					

== All-time medal table ==
Updated after the 2026 Trampoline Gymnastics World Championships.

=== Men's events ===
Rank	Nation	Gold	Silver	Bronze	Total
1	Russia	43	21	26	90
2	United States	38	38	33	109
3	China	30	23	6	59
4	Soviet Union	13	7	5	25
5	France	12	17	20	49
6	Australia	12	9	12	33
7	Belarus	11	14	12	37
8	Great Britain ^{[a]}	10	14	14	38
9	Portugal	10	10	9	29
10	Germany	6	8	6	20
11	Canada	6	7	10	23
12	Japan	5	7	11	23
13	Azerbaijan	4	2	0	6
14	Russian Gymnastics Federation ^{[c]}	4	0	1	5
15	West Germany	3	7	12	22
16	Brazil	2	1	2	5
17	New Zealand	2	0	0	2
–	Individual Neutral Athletes 1 ^{[d]}	2	0	0	2
18	Poland	1	5	10	16
19	South Africa	1	5	5	11
20	Spain	1	4	3	8
21	Ukraine	1	1	6	8
22	Bulgaria	1	1	1	3
23	Denmark	0	5	7	12
24	Switzerland	0	3	3	6
–	Individual Neutral Athletes 2 ^{[e]}	0	2	1	3
25	Scotland ^{[b]}	0	1	0	1
25	Sweden	0	1	0	1
27	Argentina	0	0	1	1
27	Netherlands	0	0	1	1
Total		218	213	218	649

=== Women's events ===
Rank	Nation	Gold	Silver	Bronze	Total
1	United States	41	35	29	105
2	Russia	37	25	19	81
3	China	31	13	7	51
4	Great Britain ^{[a]}	17	32	27	76
5	Soviet Union	12	6	4	22
6	Canada	11	20	25	56
7	France	11	13	14	38
8	West Germany	8	10	10	28
9	Japan	8	5	3	16
10	New Zealand	7	6	1	14
11	Ukraine	6	11	6	23
12	Australia	5	9	9	23
13	Germany	4	7	8	19
14	Portugal	3	3	5	11
15	Sweden	3	0	2	5
16	Belarus	2	8	10	20
17	South Africa	2	3	12	17
18	Spain	2	1	2	5
18	Switzerland	2	1	2	5
20	Netherlands	1	2	2	5
–	Individual Neutral Athletes 2 ^{[e]}	1	1	0	2
21	Greece	1	0	0	1
22	Belgium	0	4	6	10
23	Russian Gymnastics Federation ^{[c]}	0	1	2	3
24	Bulgaria	0	1	1	2
25	Argentina	0	1	0	1
–	Individual Neutral Athletes 1 ^{[d]}	0	1	0	1
26	Mexico	0	0	2	2
26	Poland	0	0	2	2
28	Georgia	0	0	1	1
28	Slovenia	0	0	1	1
28	Uzbekistan	0	0	1	1
Total		215	219	213	647

=== Mixed events ===
Rank	Nation	Gold	Silver	Bronze	Total
1	United States	2	3	0	5
2	China	2	1	1	4
3	Russia	2	0	0	2
4	Great Britain ^{[a]}	1	0	4	5
5	Belarus	1	0	0	1
5	Russian Gymnastics Federation ^{[c]}	1	0	0	1
–	Individual Neutral Athletes 1 ^{[d]}	1	0	0	1
7	Portugal	0	2	2	4
8	Azerbaijan	0	1	1	2
8	Japan	0	1	1	2
10	West Germany	0	1	0	1
–	Individual Neutral Athletes 2 ^{[e]}	0	1	0	1
11	Canada	0	0	1	1
Total		10	10	10	30

=== Overall ===
Rank	Nation	Gold	Silver	Bronze	Total
1	Russia	82	46	45	173
2	United States	81	76	62	219
3	China	63	37	14	114
4	Great Britain ^{[a]}	28	46	45	119
5	Soviet Union	25	13	9	47
6	France	23	30	34	87
7	Canada	17	27	36	80
8	Australia	17	18	21	56
9	Belarus	14	22	22	58
10	Portugal	13	15	16	44
11	Japan	13	13	16	42
12	West Germany	11	18	22	51
13	Germany	10	15	14	39
14	New Zealand	9	6	1	16
15	Ukraine	7	12	12	31
16	Russian Gymnastics Federation ^{[c]}	5	1	3	9
17	Azerbaijan	4	3	1	8
18	South Africa	3	8	17	28
19	Spain	3	5	5	13
20	Sweden	3	1	2	6
–	Individual Neutral Athletes 1 ^{[d]}	3	1	0	4
21	Switzerland	2	4	5	11
22	Brazil	2	1	2	5
23	Poland	1	5	12	18
–	Individual Neutral Athletes 2 ^{[e]}	1	4	1	6
24	Netherlands	1	2	3	6
25	Bulgaria	1	2	2	5
26	Greece	1	0	0	1
27	Denmark	0	5	7	12
28	Belgium	0	4	6	10
29	Argentina	0	1	1	2
30	Scotland ^{[b]}	0	1	0	1
31	Mexico	0	0	2	2
32	Georgia	0	0	1	1
32	Slovakia	0	0	1	1
32	Uzbekistan	0	0	1	1
Totals (34 entries)		443	442	441	1,326

Notes

- ^[a] The official report of the 1965 Trampoline World Championships lists bronze medalist in men's tumbling Peter Davies as an athlete representing Wales (WAL). Similarly, official reports credit 2 silver and 3 bronze medals earned at the 1964 and 1965 editions as a medals for England, instead of Great Britain. However, the official records from the International Gymnastics Federation (FIG) state that Davies represented Great Britain (GBR). Also, these records indicate that medals once credited to England are officially considered to be awarded to Great Britain. Keeping up with the official records by FIG, the medals are credited to Great Britain instead of Wales or England.
- ^[b] Official documents from the FIG credit a silver medal earned by Geoff Fog and Alistair McCann in the men's synchro event at the 1982 edition as a medal for Scotland, instead of Great Britain.
- ^[c] At the 2021 Trampoline World Championships in Baku, Azerbaijan, in accordance with a ban by the World Anti-Doping Agency (WADA) and a decision by the Court of Arbitration for Sport (CAS), athletes from Russia were not permitted to use the Russian name, flag, or anthem. They instead participated under name and flag of the RGF (Russian Gymnastics Federation).
- ^[d] At the 2025 Trampoline World Championships in Pamplona, Spain, in accordance with sanctions imposed following by the 2022 Russian invasion of Ukraine, athletes from Belarus were not permitted to use the name, flag, or anthem of Belarus. They instead participated as "Individual Neutral Athletes 1 (AIN1)", their medals were not included in the official medal table.
- ^[e] At the 2025 Trampoline World Championships in Pamplona, Spain, in accordance with sanctions imposed following by the 2022 Russian invasion of Ukraine, athletes from Russia were not permitted to use the name, flag, or anthem of Russia. They instead participated as "Individual Neutral Athletes 2 (AIN2)", their medals were not included in the official medal table.

== Multiple gold medalists ==
Boldface denotes active trampoline gymnasts and highest medal count among all trampoline gymnasts (including these who not included in these tables) per type.

=== Men ===
==== All events ====
Rank	Trampoline gymnast	Country	From	To	Gold	Silver	Bronze	Total
1	Alexander Moskalenko	Soviet Union; Russia	1990	2003	**14**	4	–	18
2	Dong Dong	China	2007	2019	12	7	2	**21**
3	Mikhail Zalomin	Russia; Russian Gymnastics Federation; Individual Neutral Athletes 2	2013	2025	11	3	1	15
4	Tu Xiao	China	2007	2019	10	4	–	14
5	German Khnytchev	Russia	1992	2005	7	2	3	12
6	Gao Lei	China	2013	2019	7	2	1	10
7	**Ruben Padilla**	United States	2018	2026	6	8	3	17
8	Dmitri Poliaroush	Soviet Union; Belarus	1986	2003	6	6	1	13
9	Adrian Wareham	Australia	1982	1998	6	4	3	13
10	Brett Austine	Australia	1978	1988	6	3	2	11

==== Individual events ====
Rank	Trampoline gymnast	Country	From	To	Gold	Silver	Bronze	Total
1	Mikhail Zalomin	Russia; Individual Neutral Athletes 2	2013	2025	**5**	2	–	7
2	Alexander Moskalenko	Soviet Union; Russia	1990	2003	**5**	1	–	6
3	Gao Lei	China	2015	2019	4	–	–	4
4	Dong Dong	China	2007	2019	3	**4**	2	**9**
5	**Ruben Padilla**	United States	2018	2025	3	3	1	7
6	Yang Song	China	2009	2015	3	2	–	5
7	Brett Austine	Australia	1978	1988	3	1	2	6
8	Steve Elliott	United States	1980	1984	2	1	1	4
8	Adrian Wareham	Australia	1988	1994	2	1	1	4
10	David Jacobs	United States	1966	1968	2	1	–	3

=== Women ===
==== All events ====
Rank	Trampoline gymnast	Country	From	To	Gold	Silver	Bronze	Total
1	Irina Karavayeva	Russia	1994	2010	**12**	5	2	**19**
2	**Jia Fangfang**	China	2011	2026	10	1	–	11
3	Zhong Xingping	China	2005	2017	9	2	–	11
4	Judy Wills	United States	1964	1968	9	–	–	9
5	Anna Korobeynikova	Russia	1998	2017	8	5	3	16
6	Chrystel Robert	France	1988	1999	8	4	1	13
7	**Zhu Xueying**	China	2017	2026	8	2	–	10
8	**Hikaru Mori**	Japan	2017	2026	7	3	3	13
9	Li Dan	China	2009	2015	7	1	2	10
9	Tatyana Lushina	Soviet Union; Russia	1986	1994	7	1	2	10

==== Individual events ====
Rank	Trampoline gymnast	Country	From	To	Gold	Silver	Bronze	Total
1	Judy Wills	United States	1964	1968	**7**	–	–	7
2	Irina Karavayeva	Russia	1994	2007	5	2	–	7
3	**Jia Fangfang**	China	2011	2018	5	–	–	5
4	Anna Korobeynikova	Russia	2003	2017	4	2	2	**8**
5	Chrystel Robert	France	1990	1999	4	1	1	6
6	Kylie Walker	New Zealand	1990	1998	3	1	–	4
7	Lina Sjöberg	Sweden	2015	2021	3	–	2	5
8	Jill Hollembeak	United States	1982	1986	3	–	–	3
9	Rosie MacLennan	Canada	2007	2019	2	2	3	7
10	Olena Chabanenko	Ukraine	2001	2007	2	2	–	4

== See also ==
- Junior World Gymnastics Championships
- Gymnastics at the Summer Olympics
- Gymnastics at the Youth Olympic Games
- Gymnastics World Championships
- List of gymnastics competitions
- Major achievements in gymnastics by nation
