= Staude =

Staude is a surname. Notable people with the surname include:

- Christoph Staude (born 1965), German composer
- Keanu Staude (born 1997), German footballer
- Otto Staude (1857–1928), German mathematician
