= Leigh Hennessy =

American athlete and film stunt actor

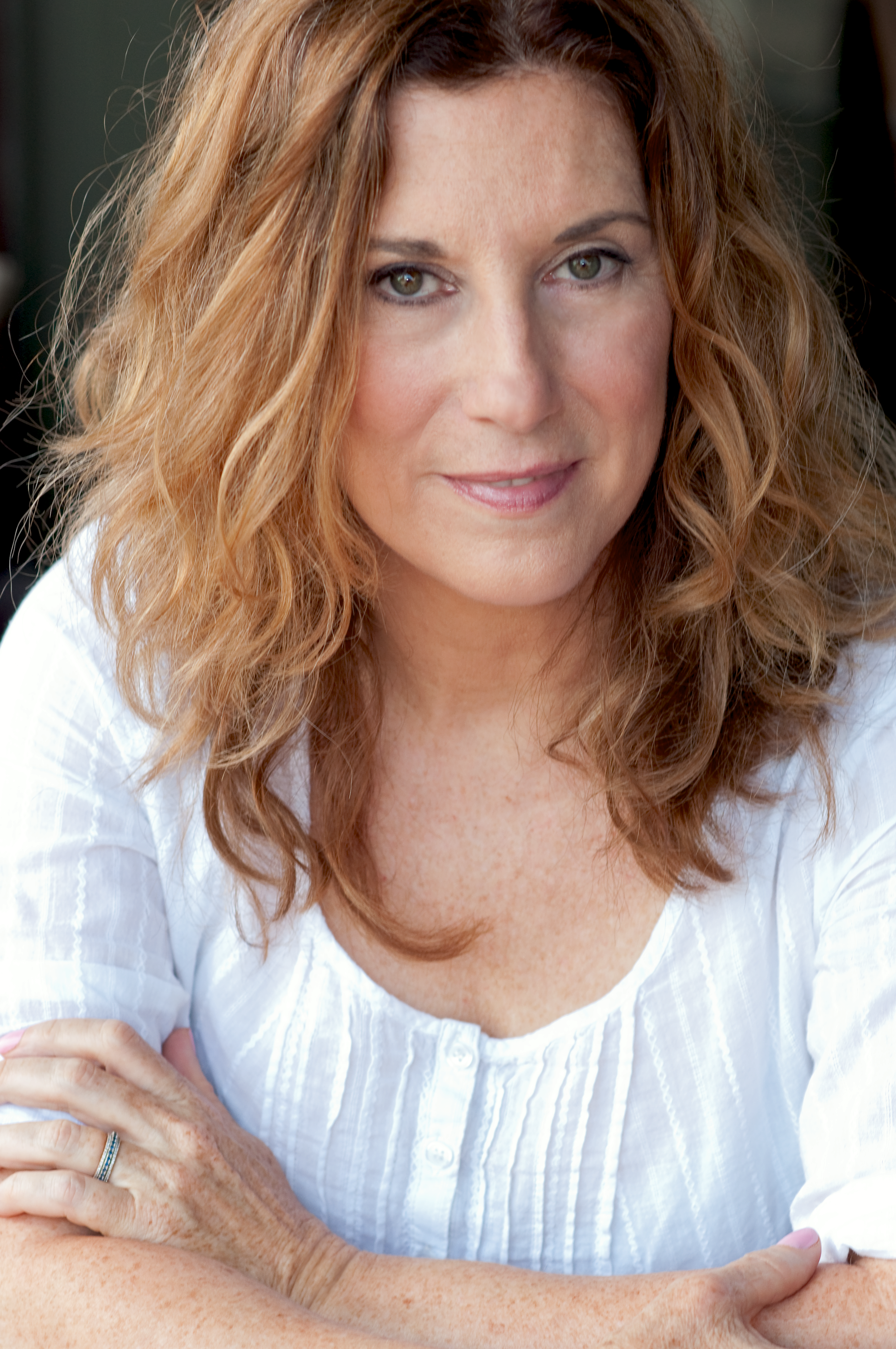

Personal information
- Full name: Leigh Hennessy-Robson
- Born: Lafayette, Louisiana, U.S.
- Spouse: Mark Robson
- Relatives: Jeff Hennessy (father)

Gymnastics career
- Discipline: Trampoline gymnastics
- Country represented: United States
- College team: Louisiana Ragin' Cajuns

Leigh Hennessy, also known as Leigh Hennessy-Robson, is an American former trampoline gymnast. She was a two-time double mini-trampoline world champion (1976, 1978) and won a silver medal in synchronized trampoline at the World Trampoline Championships (1976). She later became a stunt performer and actress.

== Early life and education ==
Leigh Hennessy was born in Lafayette, Louisiana. Her father, Jeff Hennessy, was an expert in the sport of trampolining and was inducted into the ULL and USA Gymnastics Halls of Fame. She started jumping on trampolines at age 3, and her father served as her first coach.

Hennessy attended Lafayette High School and the University of Louisiana at Lafayette (UL Lafayette), and trained under her father. She earned her master's degree in communication from UL Lafayette.

== Gymnastics career ==
In 1978, she was the first athlete, male or female, to win all three trampoline events in the US National Championships. She was honored in 1978 by the Southern Amateur Athletic Union as "Athlete of the Year.

While attended UL Lafayette, Hennessy was a five-time National Amateur Athletic Union (AAU) All-American for trampoline, from 1976 to 1980. After graduation, Hennessy became a 10-time United States champion and two-time World Champion.

According to Guinness World Records, she holds the record for winning the most US national championships in trampoline for women. She competed for the United States in numerous world championships in individual trampoline, synchronized trampoline, and double mini-trampoline, winning two Senior level world titles. In August 2007, Hennessy was inducted into the USA Gymnastics Hall of Fame in recognition of her trampoline achievements.

== Personal life ==
Leigh's career shifted to stunt work in Hollywood. Among her list of credits includes performing stunts for Demi Moore as her stunt double in GI Jane (1997), performing 90-foot high-falls for Lucy Liu in both Charlie's Angels movies (2000, 2003), and she shared the opening scenes of The Guardian (2006) with Kevin Costner, in which she played the role of the drowning wife. Between her early gymnastics career and later stunt career, she developed arthritis and ultimately underwent a full knee replacement.

She was nominated for a Taurus World Stunt Award in 2006, 2007 for her work.

In 2008, Hennessy and Mark B. Robson married at the Birse Kirk church in Birse, located in the Scottish Highlands.

== Publications ==
- Honore, Russel L. (2017). Angers, Trent (ed.). Don't Get Stuck on Stupid!: Leadership in Action. Mark B. Robson (contributor), Leigh Hennessy Robson (contributor). Acadian House Publishing. ISBN 978-0999588413.
- Hennessy, Jefferson; Hennessy Robson, Leigh; Robson, Mark B. (2017). The Day of the Cajundome Mega-Shelter. Acadian House Publishing. ISBN 978-0-925417-95-4.

== Awards and honors ==
- World Acrobatics Society Legends Hall of Fame, 2005
- Lifetime achievement award from the International Trampoline Federation, 1982
- University of Louisiana Ragin Cajun Athletics Hall of Fame, 2019
