= Lisa Newman-Morris =

Australian trampoline gymnast

Lisa Newman-Morris (previously Tayler, born 1971) was one of Australia’s most successful international trampoline gymnasts, becoming World Champion at the 1990 World Trampoline Championships in Essen, Germany in Double-Mini Trampoline, following a silver medal two years prior in the same event at the 1988 World Championships in Birmingham USA.

Newman-Morris was part of the World Champion Women's Double-Mini team at the 1988 World Championships in Birmingham, USA. Newman-Morris held Australian National titles in 1987, 1989 – 1991, Pan Pacific titles from 1987 – 1991 and she won over 40 Victorian State titles over the period of 1984 – 1991.

== Education ==
Newman-Morris graduated from Firbank Grammar School in 1988 and went onto complete a Bachelor of Education (Physical Education) at Deakin University in 1992.

== Sporting career ==
Newman-Morris began Trampolining in 1979, aged 7. She competed in her first Victorian State Championships in 1980, aged 8 and her first Australian National Championships in 1981, aged 9.

Newman-Morris first represented Australia at the World Age Group Championships in 1981, aged 10 and then represented her country in her first National Open Age Team aged just 15 at the Pan Pacific Championships in 1985.

She was the Victorian Team Captain from 1989 – 1991 and Australian Team Captain in 1991.

Newman-Morris also excelled in the sport of artistic gymnastics where she reached Level 10 standard and was placed 3rd in the 1987 Australian Level 10 Championships. She also represented Australia in the 1987 Australia versus New Zealand challenge and placed 2nd overall.

== Early career ==
Newman-Morris began coaching at the Cheltenham Youth Club in 1987 and went on to coach 2 World Champions, 7 National Champions an dozens of State champions. Most notably of these was Jacinta Harford, who placed fourth and fifth at the 1998 and 1999 Trampoline World Championships in the Double-Mini Trampoline event respectively. Newman-Morris also was the original coach of Christie Jenkins, Australian Champion Trampolinist. Following her own retirement from competition, Newman-Morris went on to become head coach at Cheltenham Youth Club and built the club into one of the largest and most successful clubs in Australia. Newman-Morris was then selected as National Age Group Coach in 1993, 1994 and 1996 and Assistant to the National Coach for the World Championships in 1997.

In the lead up to the Sydney 2000 Olympics, Newman-Morris along with her athlete Jacinta Harford, were selected in the Olympic Athlete Program squad to work with Russian coach Nikolay Zhuravlev, specifically brought into Australia to prepare the Olympic squad and their coaches towards the Sydney Olympics.

Newman-Morris took a career turn in 2000 to focus on developing her fitness and health career. Having gaining her Personal Training qualification in 1999, Newman-Morris trained clients at the Waves Leisure Centre in Highett, Melbourne from 1999 - 2003. She also gained qualifications in the Les Mills programs, Body Pump, Body Combat, Body Balance and Body Attack.

In 2003, Newman-Morris started Step into Life Chelsea, a Group Outdoor Personal Training franchise business in south east Melbourne. Newman-Morris won several awards in the first year after beginning her business including New Franchise Rapid Growth Award in 2003 and Rookie Franchise of the Year in 2004. As well as continuing to operate the business, Newman-Morris is also Creative Director of the Step into Life powerflex program. She is responsible for the training of all Step into Life trainers and assistant trainers in the program as well as the ongoing research and development of new programs. Newman-Morris also has positions as Business Coach for the Step into Life Victoria group and Mentor Coach for Step into Life Australia.

Newman-Morris also runs her own lifestyle coaching business offering health, fitness and lifestyle advice and coaching. She has written 2 books – ‘10 steps to finding your passion’ ebook and is soon to publish her second full-length book.

== Personal life ==
Newman-Morris currently lives in Melbourne Australia with her 2 sons.

== Awards ==
=== Trampolining ===
- 1986 - 1998 awarded Gold Award MLC Junior Sports Foundation
- 1996 One of four finalists Australia wide in Australian Young Achiever Awards - Young Coach of the Year
- 2000 awarded Australian Sports Medal for service to Trampolining
- 2000 awarded Life Membership of Gymnastics Australia
- 2000 selected to participate in the Sydney 2000 Olympic Torch Relay for her service to Trampolining. She carried the torch through Yallorn North in August 2000.

=== Step into Life ===
- Leadership and Outstanding service award 2011
- National Franchise of the year 2007
- Victorian Franchise of the year 2007, 2009
- Rookie Franchise of the Year 2004
- New Franchise Rapid Growth Award 2003

== Trampoline results ==
=== World Championships ===
1990 – Essen, Germany

- 1st Double-Mini Trampoline
- 2nd Double-Mini Trampoline team
- 4th Synchronised Trampoline

1988 – Birmingham, USA

- 1st Double-Mini Trampoline team
- 2nd Double –Mini Trampoline
- 6th Synchronised Trampoline
- 14th Individual Trampoline

1986 – Paris, France

- 6th Synchronised Trampoline

=== World Age Group Championship ===
1986 – Moulins, France

- 1st 13-14yrs Trampoline
- 1st 13-14yrs Double-Mini Trampoline
- 1st 18+yrs Synchronised Trampoline

1984 – Kanazawa, Japan

- 1st 11-12 yrs Trampoline
- 1st 11-12 yrs Double-Mini Trampoline

=== Pan Pacific Championships ===
1991 – Bendigo, Australia

- 1st Trampoline

1989 – Osaka, Japan

- 1st Double-Mini Trampoline
- 3rd Trampoline

1987 – Brisbane, Australia

- 1st Synchronised Trampoline
- 2nd Trampoline

1985 – Auckland, New Zealand

- 3rd Trampoline

=== Pan Pacific Age Group Championships ===
1989 – Osaka, Japan

- 1st 18+yrs Double-Mini Trampoline
- 1st 18+yrs Synchronised Trampoline
- 2nd 18+yrs Trampoline

1987 – Brisbane, Australia

- 1st 15-17yrs Trampoline
- 1st 18+yrs Synchronised Trampoline

1985 – Auckland, New Zealand

- 1st 13-14yrs Synchronised Trampoline
- 2nd 13-14yrs Trampoline
- 2nd 13-14yrs Tumbling
- 3rd 13-14yrs Double-Mini Trampoline

=== World Games ===
1989 – Karlsruhe, Germany

- 2nd Synchronised Trampoline

=== Australian Championships ===
1991

- 1st Trampoline
- 2nd Synchronised Trampoline

1990

- 1st Trampoline
- 1st Double-Mini Trampoline
- 1st Synchronised Trampoline

1989

- 1st Trampoline
- 2nd Double-Mini Trampoline
- 2nd Synchronised Trampoline

1987

- 1st Double-Mini Trampoline
- 1st Synchronised Trampoline

1986

- 1st Synchronised Trampoline
- 3rd Double-Mini Trampoline
- 3rd Trampoline

1985

- 2nd Double-Mini Trampoline
