= Mildred Masterson McNeilly =

American author

Mildred Masterson McNeilly (28 May 1910 – 12 July 1997) was an American author best known for her novel Each Bright River.

She also wrote for mystery magazines under the pen-names James Dewey and Glenn Kelly.

== Critical reception ==
The New York Review of Books said "...McNeilly writes with the authority of a careful researcher. There is excitement here as the author re-creates the agony of the Whitman Massacre, the adventure of the Gold Rush of '48, the fear and laughter of spirited men ..."

== Bibliography ==
- Each Bright River: A Novel of the Oregon Country (1950)
- Praise at Morning (1947)
- Heaven is Too High
- Lovely Day
- Great is the Glory (1946)
