= Timeline of the 20th century =

This is a timeline of the 20th century.

== 1900s ==
=== 1901 ===
- January 1: The Australian colonies federate.
- January 22: Edward VII became King of England and Emperor of India after Queen Victoria's death.
- March 2: The Platt Amendment provides for Cuban independence in exchange for the withdrawal of American troops.
- June: Emily Hobhouse reports on the poor conditions in 45 British internment camps for Boer women and children in South Africa.
- September 6: The assassination of William McKinley ushered in office Vice President Theodore Roosevelt after McKinley's death on September 14.
- September 7: The Eight-Nation Alliance defeats the Boxer Rebellion, and imposes heavy financial penalties on China.
- December 10: First Nobel Prizes awarded.
- December 12: Guglielmo Marconi received the first transatlantic radio signal.

=== 1902 ===
- January 13: The Unification of Saudi Arabia begins.
- May 20: Cuba given independence by the United States.
- May 31: Second Boer War ends in British victory.
- July 12: Arthur Balfour becomes Prime Minister of the United Kingdom.
- July 17: Willis Carrier invents the first modern electrical air conditioning unit.
- Venezuelan crisis of 1902–1903, in which Britain, Germany and Italy impose a naval blockade on Venezuela in order to enforce collection of outstanding financial claims.

=== 1903 ===
- February 15: The first teddy bear is invented.
- June 11: King Alexander I of Serbia and his wife Queen Draga are assassinated in a military coup.
- July 1: The first Tour de France is held.
- July–August: In Russia the Bolsheviks and the Mensheviks form from the breakup of the Russian Social Democratic Labour Party.
- August 4: Pius X becomes Pope.
- November 18: Independence of Panama, the Hay–Bunau-Varilla Treaty is signed by the United States and Panama.
- December 17: First controlled heavier-than-air flight of the Wright brothers.
- The Ottoman Empire and the German Empire sign an agreement to build the Berlin–Baghdad railway.

=== 1904 ===
- February 8: A Japanese surprise attack on Port Arthur (Lushun) starts the Russo-Japanese War.
- April 8: Entente Cordiale signed between Britain and France.
- May: U.S. begins construction of the Panama Canal and eradication of yellow fever.
- June 21: Trans-Siberian Railway is completed.
- Herero and Nama genocide, the first genocide of the 20th century, begins in German South West Africa.
- Roger Casement publishes his account of Belgian atrocities in the Congo Free State.

=== 1905 ===
- January 22: The Revolution of 1905 in Russia erupts.
- March 31: The First Moroccan Crisis begins, going until April 1906.
- June 7: The Norwegian Parliament declares the union with Sweden dissolved, and Norway achieves full independence.
- September 5: The Russo-Japanese War ends in Japanese victory.
- September 26: Albert Einstein's formulation of special relativity.
- October 16: The British Indian Province of Bengal, partitioned by the Viceroy of India, Lord Curzon, despite strong opposition.
- December 5: Liberal Henry Campbell-Bannerman becomes Prime Minister of the United Kingdom.
- Schlieffen Plan proposed in Berlin to defeat France.
- The Persian Constitutional Revolution begins.

=== 1906 ===
- April 18: An earthquake in San Francisco, California, magnitude 7.9, kills 3,000.
- July 13: Alfred Dreyfus is exonerated and reinstated as a major in the French Army; the Dreyfus affair ends.
- August 16: An earthquake in Valparaíso, Chile, magnitude 8.2, kills 20,000.
- September 28: The US begins the Second Occupation of Cuba.
- October 23: Brazilian inventor Alberto Santos-Dumont takes off and flies his 14-bis to a crowd in Paris.
- December 30: The Muslim League is formed by Nawab Salimullah Khan of Dacca.
- The Stolypin reform in Russia creates a new class of affluent kulaks.

=== 1907 ===
- February–April: A peasants' revolt in Romania kills roughly 11,000.
- March 15–16: Elections to the new Parliament of Finland are the first in the world with woman candidates, as well as the first elections in Europe where universal suffrage is applied.
- July 24: Japan–Korea Treaty of 1907.
- August 31: The Anglo-Russian Convention bring an end to the Great Game in Central Asia.
- The Indian National Congress splits into two factions at its Surat session, presided by Rash Behari Bose.
- Persian Constitutional Revolution ends with the establishment of a parliament.
- Bakelite, the world's first fully synthetic plastic, invented in New York by Leo Baekeland, who coins the term "plastics".

=== 1908 ===
- April 8: Liberal H. H. Asquith becomes Prime Minister of the United Kingdom.
- May 26: First commercial Middle Eastern oilfield established, at Masjed Soleyman in southwest Persia.
- June 30: The Tunguska event devastates thousands of square kilometres of Siberia.
- July: Young Turk Revolution in the Ottoman Empire.
- July 26: Founding of the Bureau of Investigation (BOI)
- October 1: The Ford Motor Company invents the Model T.
- early October: Austria-Hungary annexes Bosnia-Herzegovina, triggering the Bosnian Crisis.
- October 5: Bulgarian Declaration of Independence.
- December 2: Puyi, the last Emperor of China, assumes the throne.
- December 28: The 1908 Messina earthquake in southern Italy, magnitude 7.1, kills 70,000 people.
- Herero and Nama genocide ends.
- First commercial radio transmissions.
- The coldest year since 1880 according to NASA.

=== 1909 ===
- March 4: William Howard Taft is inaugurated as President of the United States; deep divisions in his Republican Party over tariffs.
- March 10: Anglo-Siamese Treaty of 1909 signed (effective on July 9).
- March 12: Indian Councils Act passed.
- April 6: Robert Peary claims to have reached the North Pole though the claim is subsequently heavily contested.
- April 13: A countercoup fails in the Ottoman Empire.
- July 16: A revolution forces Mohammad Ali Shah Qajar, Persian Shah of the Qajar dynasty to abdicate in favor of his son Ahmad Shah Qajar.
- Japan and China sign the Jiandao/Gando Treaty.
- United States troops leave Cuba.

== 1910s ==
=== 1910 ===
- February 8: Boy Scouts of America is founded.
- April: Halley's Comet returns.
- May–July: Albanian revolt of 1910.
- May 6: George V becomes King of the United Kingdom and the British Dominions and Emperor of India upon the death of Edward VII.
- May 31: Union of South Africa is created.
- August 28: Kingdom of Montenegro is proclaimed independent.
- August 29: Imperial Japan annexes Korea.
- October 5: The 5 October 1910 revolution in Portugal and proclamation of the First Portuguese Republic.
- November 20: Beginning of the Mexican Revolution (Plan of San Luis Potosí).

=== 1911 ===
- January 18: Eugene Burton Ely lands on the deck of the USS Pennsylvania stationed in San Francisco harbor, marking the first time an aircraft lands on a ship.
- March 25: Triangle Shirtwaist Factory fire in New York City results in the deaths of 146 workers and leads to sweeping workplace safety reforms.
- April–November: Second Moroccan Crisis.
- September 29: The Italo-Turkish war which led to the capture of Libya by Italy, begins.
- October 10: 1911 Revolution, which overthrew the Qing dynasty of China, begins.
- November 3: Swiss race car driver and automotive engineer Louis Chevrolet co-founds the Chevrolet Motor Company in Detroit with his brother Arthur Chevrolet, William C. Durant and others.
- December 12: New Delhi becomes the capital of British India.
- December 14: Roald Amundsen first reaches the South Pole.
- Ernest Rutherford identifies the atomic nucleus.

=== 1912 ===
- February 8: The African National Congress is founded.
- February 12: End of the Chinese Empire. Republic of China established.
- February 14: Arizona becomes the last state to be admitted to the continental Union.
- late March: Captain Scott and his companions die in a blizzard on their way back from the South Pole.
- March 30: Morocco becomes a protectorate of France.
- April 15: Sinking of the RMS Titanic.
- July 30: Emperor Meiji dies, ending the Meiji era; his son, the Emperor Taishō, becomes Emperor of Japan.
- August 25: The Kuomintang, the Chinese nationalist party, is founded.
- October 8: The First Balkan War begins.
- Banana Wars: United States occupation of Nicaragua begins.

=== 1913 ===
- January 23: In the 1913 Ottoman coup d'état, Ismail Enver comes to power.
- February 9–19: Ten Tragic Days in Mexico City.
- March 4: Woodrow Wilson is inaugurated as President of the United States.
- May 29: Igor Stravinsky's The Rite of Spring infamously premiers in Paris which causes a riot.
- May 30: Treaty of London.
- June–August: Second Balkan War.
- August 10: Treaty of Bucharest.
- October 7: Ford Motor Company introduces the first moving assembly line.
- December 23: The Federal Reserve System is created.
- Yuan Shikai uses military force to dissolve China's parliament and rules as a dictator.
- Niels Bohr formulates the first cohesive model of the atomic nucleus, and in the process paves the way to quantum mechanics.

=== 1914 ===
- June 28: Gavrilo Princip assassinates Archduke Franz Ferdinand of Austria in Sarajevo, triggering the start of World War I that day.
- August 15: Panama Canal opens.
- August 26–30: Battle of Tannenberg.
- September 1: Martha, last known passenger pigeon, dies.
- September 3: Benedict XV becomes Pope.
- September 6–12: First Battle of the Marne.
- September–October: The Race to the Sea leaves Germany and the Allies entrenched along the Western Front.
- December 19: The United Kingdom establishes the Sultanate of Egypt as a protectorate.
- December 25: The Christmas truce is celebrated by the Germans and the British along the Western Front.

=== 1915 ===
- April 22: Second Battle of Ypres begins, first widespread use of poison gas.
- April 24: The deportation of Armenian leaders and notables in Constantinople signals the onset of the Armenian genocide.
- May 7: Sinking of the RMS Lusitania.
- July 28: In the Banana Wars, the United States occupation of Haiti begins.
- The first large scale use of poison gas by both sides in World War I occurs, first by the Germans at the Battle of Humin-Bolimów on the eastern front, and at the Second Battle of Ypres on the western front, and then by the British at the Battle of Loos.

=== 1916 ===
- January 9: The Allies' Gallipoli campaign ends in failure; heavy losses of Australian troops.
- February – December: Battle of Verdun.
- March 7: Bayerische Flugzeugwerke, later to become BMW, is founded in Germany.
- April 24–30: Easter Rising in Ireland.
- April 30: The first nationwide implementation of daylight saving time in the German Empire and Austria-Hungary.
- June–September: Brusilov offensive by Russia.
- June 6: The Warlord Era begins in China after the death of Yuan Shikai.
- June 10: The Arab Revolt begins.
- July–November: Battle of the Somme on Western Front; massive casualties.
- September 15–22: First use of tanks at the Battle of Flers–Courcelette.
- December: The Pact is agreed upon by both the Congress and the Muslim League at the Indian city of Lucknow.
- December 6: Liberal David Lloyd George becomes Prime Minister of the United Kingdom.
- December 30: Grigori Rasputin is assassinated in Russia.
- Market Square, one of the earliest shopping malls, opens in the Chicago metropolitan area.

=== 1917 ===
- March 8: Russian Revolution ends the Russian Empire; beginning of Russian Civil War.
- April 6: USA joins the Entente for the last 17 months of World War I.
- May–October: Apparitions of Our Lady of the Rosary in Fátima, Portugal.
- June 4: The first Pulitzer Prizes announced.
- July–November: Battle of Passchendaele.
- October–November: Battle of Caporetto.
- November 1–2: The Third Battle of Gaza ends in British victory.
- November 7 (O.S. October 25): October Revolution in the Russian Republic.
- November 8: The Ukrainian–Soviet War begins.
- November 26: The National Hockey League is formed in Montreal, Canada.
- December 6: Independence of Finland.
- The first known sale of Girl Scout Cookies begins.

=== 1918 ===
- January–May: Finnish Civil War.
- January 22: Ukraine declares independence from Russia.
- February 16: The Council of Lithuania unanimously adopts the Act of Independence, declaring Lithuania an independent country.
- March–July: The German spring offensive.
- March 11: Beginning of the Spanish flu pandemic, which lasts until April 1920 and kills tens of millions.
- March 25: Belarus declares independence from Russia.
- March 30: The Armenian–Azerbaijani War begins.
- May 28: Azerbaijan Democratic Republic declared.
- July 4: Mehmed VI becomes the last Sultan of the Ottoman Empire and the last Caliph.
- July 16–17: Assassination of Tsar Nicholas II and his family.
- August 8–12: Battle of Amiens.
- August–November: The Hundred Days Offensive sends Germany into defeat.
- October: the State of Slovenes, Croats and Serbs is established.
- October 29: German Revolution begins.
- October 30:
  - The Mutawakkilite Kingdom of Yemen founded.
  - The Partition of the Ottoman Empire begins.
- November 1:
  - Independence declared in the West Ukrainian People's Republic.
  - The Polish–Ukrainian War begins.
- November 9: Abdication of Wilhelm II.
- November 11:
  - The Armistice of 11 November 1918 ends World War I.
  - Poland declares independence from Russia.
- December 1: The Kingdom of Iceland, a personal union with Denmark, is formed.
- The British occupy Palestine.

=== 1919 ===
- Paris Peace Conference writes Treaty of Versailles that punishes Germany.
- January 21: The First Red Scare in the United States. Irish War of Independence begins.
- February 14: Polish–Soviet War begins.
- March 2: Communist International established in the Kremlin to coordinate Communist parties worldwide.
- April 11: The International Labour Organization is established.
- April 13: The Jallianwala Bagh massacre in northern India: Acting Brigadier-General Reginald Dyer orders troops of the British Indian Army to fire their rifles into a crowd of unarmed Indian civilians, killing from 379 to 1,000 people and injuring another 1,500.
- May 19: Turkish War of Independence begins.
- June 28: The Treaty of Versailles redraws European borders.
- July: The 1919 Egyptian revolution erupts.
- July 18: End of Polish–Ukrainian War.
- August 11: German Revolution ends with the collapse of the German Empire and the establishment of the Weimar Republic.
- November 9: Release date of Feline Follies, the first appearance of Felix the Cat (then known as Master Tom).
- First experimental evidence for the General theory of relativity obtained by Arthur Eddington.
- Ernest Rutherford discovers the proton.

== 1920s ==
=== 1920 ===
- January 10: League of Nations founded.
- January 17: Prohibition in the United States begins.
- February 2: Victory for Estonia in the Estonian War of Independence.
- April 25: Mandatory Palestine established.
- April 27–28: Red Army invasion of Azerbaijan and Armenia ends the Armenian–Azerbaijani War and concludes with their incorporation into the Soviet Union.
- September 5: Mahatma Gandhi launches Non-cooperation movement.
- December 1: Mexican Revolution ends.
- Greece restores its monarchy after a referendum.

=== 1921 ===
- January 25: Premiere of the science-fiction play R.U.R. (Rossum's Universal Robots), in which the word "robot" was first used.
- February–March: Russia invades Georgia and incorporates it into the Soviet Union.
- March 4: Warren G. Harding is inaugurated as President of the United States.
- March 18: End of the Polish–Soviet War.
- July 29: Adolf Hitler becomes Führer of the Nazi Party as hyperinflation in the Weimar Republic begins.
- November 9: The Italian National Fascist Party is established by Benito Mussolini.
- November 17: End of the Ukrainian–Soviet War.
- December 15: Coup brings the Pahlavi dynasty to power in Iran.
- Russian famine of 1921–1922 begins.

=== 1922 ===
- February 2: James Joyce publishes Ulysses.
- February 6:
  - Pius XI becomes Pope.
  - The Washington Naval Treaty is signed.
- February 28: Egypt gains independence from the United Kingdom, though British forces still occupy the Suez Canal.
- June 28: The Irish Civil War begins.
- October 23: Conservative Bonar Law becomes Prime Minister of the United Kingdom.
- October 28: March on Rome brings Benito Mussolini to power in Italy.
- November 1: Ottoman Sultanate abolished by the Grand National Assembly of Turkey; Sultan Mehmed VI is deposed.
- November 4: Howard Carter discovers the Tomb of Tutankhamun.
- November 14: British Broadcasting Corporation (BBC) established.
- December 6: Irish Free State is established, while the province of Northern Ireland is created within The United Kingdom.
- December 16: Gabriel Narutowicz, President of Poland, is assassinated.
- December 30: The Union of Soviet Socialist Republics (USSR), the world's first officially Communist state, is formed.
- The union of Costa Rica, Guatemala, Honduras and El Salvador is dissolved.
- Mohandas Gandhi calls off Non-cooperation movement.

=== 1923 ===
- January 26: The Italian reconquest of Libya begins.
- March 3: Time Magazine is first published.
- May 22: Stanley Baldwin becomes Prime Minister of the United Kingdom.
- May 24: The Irish Civil War ends.
- June 9: A military coup ousts and kills Bulgarian prime minister Aleksandar Stamboliyski.
- June 16: End of Russian Civil War.
- August 2: Death of Warren G. Harding; Vice President Calvin Coolidge assumes office as President of the United States.
- September 1: The Great Kantō earthquake kills at least 105,000 people in Japan.
- October 11: Turkish War of Independence ends; Ankara replaces Istanbul as its capital.
- October 29: Mustafa Kemal Atatürk becomes the first president of the newly established Republic of Turkey.
- November 8: The Beer Hall Putsch, an attempt to overthrow the Weimar Republic, ends in failure and brief imprisonment for Adolf Hitler but brings the Nazi Party to national attention.
- November 15: Hyperinflation in the Weimar Republic ends with the introduction of the Rentenmark.

=== 1924 ===
- January 21: The death of Vladimir Lenin triggers power struggle between Leon Trotsky and Joseph Stalin.
- January 22: Ramsay MacDonald becomes Prime Minister of the United Kingdom; first Labour Party prime minister.
- January 25–February 5: The first edition of the Winter Olympic Games is hosted in Chamonix, France.
- February 12: Rhapsody in Blue by George Gershwin premieres in New York City.
- March 3: The Caliphate is abolished by Kemal Atatürk.
- May 24: Immigration Act of 1924 significantly restricts immigration from Asia, the Middle East, and Southern Europe to USA.
- August 28: The August Uprising in Georgia against Soviet rule.
- November 4: Conservative Stanley Baldwin becomes Prime Minister of the United Kingdom.

=== 1925 ===
- January 3: Benito Mussolini delivers a speech to begin his dictatorship.
- March–April: First televisual image introduced by John Logie Baird.
- July 18: Hitler's Mein Kampf is published.
- October 5 – 16: Locarno Treaties signed.
- Saudi conquest of Hejaz.
- Serum run to Nome.

=== 1926 ===
- May 12–14: May Coup in Poland.
- May 28: 28 May 1926 coup d'état in Portugal.
- June 19: National Broadcasting Company (NBC) founded in New York City.
- July 1: The Kuomintang begins the Northern Expedition, a military unification campaign in northern China.
- August 22: General Georgios Kondylis overthrows General Theodoros Pangalos in Greece.
- December 25: Emperor Taishō dies; his son, the Emperor Shōwa (Hirohito) becomes Emperor of Japan.

=== 1927 ===
- January 1: The BBC is granted a Royal charter in the United Kingdom.
- May: The Parliament of Australia convenes in Canberra for the first time.
- May 13: The United Kingdom of Great Britain and Ireland officially becomes the United Kingdom of Great Britain and Northern Ireland.
- May 18: The Bath School disaster, a series of violent attacks by Andrew Kehoe results in 45 deaths in Michigan, USA.
- May 20: Saudi Arabia gains independence.
- May 20–21: Charles Lindbergh performs the first nonstop flight from New York City to Paris; becomes a world hero.
- August 1: The Chinese Civil War begins.
- September 18: Columbia Broadcasting System (CBS) founded in New York City.
- October 4: Mount Rushmore construction begins in South Dakota, U.S.
- October 6: The Jazz Singer, the first "talkie", is released.
- November 12: Soviet general secretary Joseph Stalin becomes dictator of the Soviet Union.
- World population reaches two billion.

=== 1928 ===
- March 22: Hassan al-Banna founds the Muslim Brotherhood.
- July 24: The Kellogg–Briand Pact is signed in Paris.
- September 1: King Zog I is crowned in Albania.
- September 3: Accidental rediscovery of penicillin by Alexander Fleming.
- November 14: Afghan Civil War (1928–1929) begins.
- November 18: Steamboat Willie, is the first appearance of Mickey Mouse.
- December 29: The Warlord Era ends in China.
- Malta becomes a British Dominion.
- Chinese famine of 1928–1930 begins.
- Bubble gum is invented.

=== 1929 ===
- January 17: Thimble Theatre, is the first appearance of Popeye.
- February: Leon Trotsky is exiled.
- February 11: Pope Pius XI signs the Lateran Treaty with Italian leader Benito Mussolini, after which the Vatican City is recognised as a sovereign state.
- February 14: Saint Valentine's Day Massacre, the murder of seven members and associates of Chicago's North Side Gang.
- March 4: Herbert Hoover is inaugurated as President of the United States.
- May 16: The first Academy Awards are presented.
- June 5: Ramsay MacDonald becomes Prime Minister of the United Kingdom.
- October 24–29: Wall Street Crash of 1929 and the beginning of the Great Depression.
- First people sent to the gulag in the Soviet Union as Stalin assumes effective control.

== 1930s ==
=== 1930 ===
- February 18: Clyde Tombaugh discovers Pluto.
- March 12: Salt March by Mohandas Gandhi and the official start of civil disobedience in British India.
- April 2: Haile Selassie becomes Emperor of Abyssinia.
- April 19: Sinkin' in the Bathtub, the first Looney Tunes short, is released.
- May 27: Construction of Chrysler Building completed.
- August 4: King Kullen, widely regarded as the first supermarket, opens in Queens, New York City.
- August 9: Dizzy Dishes, is the first appearance of Betty Boop.
- September 14: Aided by the Great Depression, the Nazi Party increases its share of the vote from 2.6% to 18.3%.
- November: First Round Table Conference between India and Great Britain, which goes until January 1931.
- November 3: The Vargas Era begins in Brazil.
- Soviet famine of 1930–1933 and Holodomor begin.

=== 1931 ===
- February 12: Vatican Radio first began broadcasting.
- March 3: "The Star-Spangled Banner" is adopted as the United States's national anthem.
- April 14: The Second Spanish Republic is declared.
- May 1: Empire State Building completed.
- June: Floods in China kill up to 2.5 million people.
- September: Japan invades Manchuria, part of the chain of events leading to the start of World War II.
- October 5: Clyde Pangborn and Hugh Herndon Jr. complete the first non-stop flight across the Pacific Ocean in their plane, Miss Veedol, in 41½ hours.
- November 7: The Chinese Soviet Republic is proclaimed by Mao Zedong.
- December 11:
  - Statute of Westminster creates the British Commonwealth of Nations.
  - Independence of South Africa.
- December 12: Christ the Redeemer completed.

=== 1932 ===
- March 1: Lindbergh kidnapping.
- March 9: Éamon de Valera becomes President of the Executive Council (prime minister) of the Irish Free State.
- June 4: Military coup in Chile.
- June 24: Siamese Revolution establishes a constitutional monarchy.
- September 9: The Chaco War between Bolivia and Paraguay begins.
- November–December:
  - Failed Emu War in Australia.
  - Third Round Table Conference.
- December 19: BBC World Service starts broadcasting.
- The neutron is discovered by James Chadwick.
- The Nazi party becomes the largest single party in the German parliament.

=== 1933 ===
- January 30: Adolf Hitler becomes Chancellor of Germany.
- March 4: Franklin D. Roosevelt is inaugurated as President of the United States
- March 27: Japan announces it will leave the League of Nations.
- October 14: Germany announces its withdrawal from the League of Nations and the World Disarmament Conference, after the U.S., the U.K. and France deny its request to increase its defense armaments under the Versailles Treaty.
- December 5: Prohibition in the United States is abolished.
- New Deal begins in America.
- United States occupation of Nicaragua ends.

=== 1934 ===
- February 12–15: The Austrian Civil War results in Fascist victory.
- May 23: Bonnie and Clyde are shot to death in a police ambush.
- June 30–July 2: Adolf Hitler instigates the Night of the Long Knives, which cements his power over both the Nazi Party and Germany.
- July 22: John Dillinger is gunned down by the FBI outside the Biograph Theater.
- July 25: Engelbert Dollfuss, Chancellor of Austria, is shot dead as part of a failed Nazi coup d'état.
- August 1: The United States occupation of Haiti ends.
- August 2: With the death of Paul von Hindenburg, Hitler declares himself Führer of Germany.
- October 16: Mao Zedong begins the Long March.
- November: David Toro overthrows the government of Bolivia in a military coup.

=== 1935 ===
- May 31: Establishment of 20th Century Fox.
- March 21: Reza Shah of Iran asks the international community to formally adopt the name "Iran" to refer to the country, instead of the name "Persia".
- June 12: Chaco War ends.
- September 15: Enactment of the Nuremberg racial laws.
- October 3: The Second Italo-Ethiopian War begins and goes until February 1937. It includes events such as the exile of Haile Selassie and the conquest of Abyssinia by Benito Mussolini.
- November 15: Manuel L. Quezon becomes President of the Philippines.

=== 1936 ===
- January 20: Edward VIII becomes King of the British Commonwealth and Emperor of India.
- May 9: Italy annexes Ethiopia.
- July 17: Beginning of the Spanish Civil War.
- September 7: The last known thylacine dies in Hobart Zoo.
- December 11: After a reign shorter than one year, Edward VIII abdicates and hands the throne to his brother, George VI.
- The Hoover Dam is completed.
- Great Purge begins under Stalin.
- 1936–1939 Arab revolt in Palestine against the British begins to oppose Jewish immigration.
- George Nissen and Larry Griswold build the first modern trampoline.

=== 1937 ===
- May 6: German zeppelin Hindenburg crashes in Lakehurst, New Jersey, ending the airship era.
- May 28: Neville Chamberlain becomes Prime Minister of the United Kingdom.
- July 7: Japanese invasion of China, and the beginning of World War II in the Far East.
- August 28: Toyota founded in Japan by Kiichiro Toyoda.
- September 21: J. R. R. Tolkien publishes The Hobbit.
- December 13: The Nanjing Massacre begins, ending about a month later in January 1938. It results in from 40,000 to 300,000 deaths according to various estimates.
- December 21: Snow White and the Seven Dwarfs is the first feature-length animated movie released.
- The Irish Republican Army attempts to assassinate King George VI.
- Volkswagen founded by the German Labour Front.

=== 1938 ===
- March 12: Anschluss unifies Germany and Austria.
- April 18: DC Comics superhero Superman has its first appearance in Action Comics.
- June 15: Hungarian newspaper editor László Bíró fills a British patent of the first commercially successful ballpoint pen. This would popularize the instrument, currently the most widely used for writing, after World War II.
- July 6–15: Évian Conference ends with all attendee nations save the Dominican Republic refusing to accept more Jewish refugees from the Third Reich.
- September 30: Munich Agreement hands Czechoslovakia to Nazi Germany.
- November 9 – 10: Kristallnacht, a pogrom of over 90 Jews in Germany.
- December: Time Magazine declares Adolf Hitler as Man of the Year.
- The Great Purge ends after nearly 700,000 executions.

=== 1939 ===
- March 2: Pius XII becomes Pope.
- March 30: DC Comics superhero Batman has its first appearance in Detective Comics.
- April 1: End of Spanish Civil War; Francisco Franco becomes dictator of Spain.
- August 23: The Molotov–Ribbentrop Pact between Germany and the Soviet Union.
- August 25: Metro-Goldwyn-Mayer releases The Wizard of Oz.
- September 1–October 6: Nazi invasion of Poland triggers World War II in Europe. Soviet invasion of Poland begins 16 days later.
- September 3: Britain and France declare war on Germany; World War II begins.
- September 13: Ferrari founded in Modena, Italy (as Auto Avio Costruzioni) by Enzo Ferrari.
- The Palestinian revolt against the British ends.

== 1940s ==
=== 1940 ===
- January: Chechen insurgency begins in Soviet Union.
- March 13: The Winter War between Soviet Union and Finland ends with a costly victory for the USSR.
- April–May: The Katyn massacre of Polish soldiers in USSR and the Soviet occupation of the Baltic states.
- May 10: Winston Churchill becomes Prime Minister of the United Kingdom.
- May 15: McDonald's founded in San Bernardino, California.
- May–June: Nazis invade Denmark and Norway, followed by Belgium, the Netherlands and France; their governments (except Denmark) are exiled to the United Kingdom.
- June: The Soviet Union annexes the Baltic states.
- July–October: Battle of Britain, the first entirely aerial military campaign, becomes the first significant defeat for the Axis powers.
- August 20: Leon Trotsky is assassinated in Mexico.
- September 7: The Blitz, a German bombing campaign against the United Kingdom, begins.
- November 25: Knock Knock, is the first appearance of Woody Woodpecker.

=== 1941 ===
- June–December: Hitler commences the Nazi invasion of the Soviet Union.
- June 25: Continuation War between Finland and the Soviet Union begins. Siege of Tobruk in North Africa is the first major defeat for Hitler's land forces.
- September 8: Siege of Leningrad begins.
- October: Operation Reinhard commences the main phase of The Holocaust.
- October 21: DC Comics superhero Wonder Woman has its first appearance in All Star Comics.
- December 7: The Japanese Attack on Pearl Harbor leads to the USA joining World War II.
- Mount Rushmore construction ends.

=== 1942 ===
- April 9: Bataan Death March.
- May 4–8: Battle of the Coral Sea.
- May 5–6: Battle of Corregidor.
- June 4–7: Battle of Midway.
- July 1–27: First Battle of El Alamein.
- August:
  - Battle of Stalingrad and Guadalcanal Campaign begin.
  - Internment of Japanese-American citizens in the US begins.
- October–November: Second Battle of El Alamein.
- The Manhattan Project begins.

=== 1943 ===
- January 15: The Pentagon is completed.
- February 2: Battle of Stalingrad ends with over two million casualties and the retreat of the German Army.
- April–May: Warsaw Ghetto Uprising fails.
- May 15: American Broadcasting Company (ABC) founded in New York City.
- July–August: The failed Battle of Kursk becomes the last Nazi offensive on the Eastern Front.
- November–December: Tehran Conference between Franklin Roosevelt, Winston Churchill and Joseph Stalin agrees to launch Operation Overlord.
- A famine in Bengal kills up to 3 million people.

=== 1944 ===
- January 27: The Siege of Leningrad ends with Soviet victory after over a million deaths.
- February–March: Chechen insurgency ends with deportation of the entire Chechen population.
- June 1: First operational electronic computer, Colossus, comes online.
- June 6: D-Day landings in Normandy.
- June–August: Soviet forces launch Operation Bagration on the Eastern Front, the biggest defeat in German military history.
- July 20: Adolf Hitler survives the 20 July plot to assassinate him led by Claus von Stauffenberg.
- August 19–25: Liberation of Paris.
- September 19: The Continuation War ends.

=== 1945 ===
- February 4–11: Yalta Conference.
- February 13–15: Allied bombing of Dresden.
- February: Death of Anne Frank.
- February 3–March 3: Battle of Manila.
- March–July: Battle of Okinawa.
- April 12: Death of Franklin D. Roosevelt; Vice President Harry Truman assumes office as President of the United States.
- April–May: Battle of Berlin.
- April 28: Execution of Benito Mussolini.
- April 30: The Suicide of Adolf Hitler in Berlin as Nazi Germany collapses.
- May:
  - End of World War II in Europe.
  - The Holocaust ends after ~12 million deaths, including 6 million Jews.
- May 12: Rev W. Awdry's The Railway Series book The Three Railway Engines.
- June 26: United Nations founded (UN Charter).
- July 26: Clement Attlee becomes Prime Minister of the United Kingdom.
- July–August: The Potsdam Conference divides Europe into Western and Soviet blocs.
- August 6–9: Harry S. Truman orders the atomic bombings of Hiroshima and Nagasaki.
- August 15: Victory over Japan Day.
- August 17: Independence of Indonesia proclaimed beginning the Indonesian National Revolution.
- September 2:
  - End of World War II in Asia with the beginning of the Surrender of Japan.
  - Related subsequent announcement of the Proclamation of Independence of the Democratic Republic of Vietnam.
- October 8: The microwave cooking oven is patented, with one of the first prototypes placed at a Boston restaurant for testing.
- October 29: In Brazil, Getúlio Vargas is deposed in a coup.

=== 1946 ===
- January: Chinese Civil War resumes between Communist and Nationalist forces.
- March 22: Independence of Jordan.
- March 30: Greek Civil War begins.
- June 2: Italy becomes a republic.
- June 9: Bhumibol Adulyadej becomes King of Thailand.
- July 4: The Treaty of Manila declares the Philippines independent.
- August 16: Mustafa Barzani founds the Kurdistan Democratic Party.
- September 30–October 1: Nuremberg trials end.
- October 27: French Fourth Republic established.
- December 19: First Indochina War begins.
- First images of the Earth taken from space.

=== 1947 ===
- March 12: Harry Truman establishes the Truman Doctrine of containment of Communism.
- April 15: Jackie Robinson becomes the first African American baseball player to play modern Major League Baseball.
- July 26: Creation of the U.S. Central Intelligence Agency.
- August 14–15: Partition of India. Independence of India and Pakistan and beginning of First Indo-Pakistani War.
- November–December: Three Bell Labs engineers give the first public demonstration of the transistor, an electrical component that could control, amplify, and generate current.
- Breaking of the sound barrier by Chuck Yeager in Bell X-1.
- Hyundai Group founded by Chung Ju-yung in Seoul, South Korea.

=== 1948 ===
- January 30: Assassination of Mahatma Gandhi.
- February 4: Independence of Burma (Myanmar) and Ceylon (Sri Lanka) from Britain.
- April 3: The Marshall Plan, an American initiative for foreign aid of $13 billion to 16 Western European countries, comes into effect.
- April 7: The World Health Organization (WHO) founded.
- April 16: The Organisation for Economic Co-operation and Development (OECD) founded.
- April 23: The Soviet Sever-2 expedition become the first party to indisputably set foot on the North Pole.
- May 14: United Nations establishes Israeli Independence and the formation of the official State of Israel.
- May 15: The Arab–Israeli War begins.
- June 24: Berlin Blockade begins.
- August–September: Division of North and South Korea.
- September 24: Honda founded in Hamamatsu, Japan by Soichiro Honda and Takeo Fujisawa.
- December 10: The Universal Declaration of Human Rights adopted by the United Nations General Assembly.
- Beginning of apartheid in South Africa.

=== 1949 ===
- January 5: The First Indo-Pakistani War ends.
- January 5–8: COMECON founded by USSR and the Eastern Bloc.
- March 10: The Arab–Israeli War ends.
- April 4: The Creation of NATO.
- May 12: Berlin Blockade ends.
- May 23: Creation of NATO-backed Federal Republic of Germany (West Germany).
- June 8: George Orwell publishes Nineteen Eighty-Four.
- June 14: Albert II became the first mammal launched into space
- October 1: Chinese Communist Revolution: Establishment of the People's Republic of China under CCP Chairman Mao Zedong; The Republic of China relocates to Taiwan.
- October 7: Creation of the socialist German Democratic Republic (East Germany).
- Partition of Kashmir.
- Soviet Union tests an atomic bomb.

== 1950s ==
=== 1950 ===
- January 26: The Constitution of India comes into effect.
- February 15: The animated feature film Cinderella premiere.
- June 25: North Korean invasion of South Korea begins the Korean War.
- June–September: The Bodo League Massacre of prisoners during the Korean War.
- August–September: North Korean forces capture most of Korea, to the Pusan Perimeter.
- August 25: Bertie the Brain, one of the first computer games, is released.
- September–November: UN forces reclaim Seoul and invade North Korea.
- October: Alan Turing publishes the Turing test, one of the most influential yet controversial concepts in artificial intelligence research.
- November 17: Lhamo Dondrub assumes full political powers as the 14th Dalai Lama of Tibet.
- December 30: Peoples' World Convention (PWC) at Palais Electoral, Geneva, Switzerland
- Communist victory in the Landing Operation on Hainan Island (March–May) and Wanshan Archipelago Campaign end the Chinese Civil War (May–August).

=== 1951 ===
- July 1: Colombo Plan, a regional organisation of 27 countries designed to strengthen economic and social development of member countries in the Asia-Pacific region, commences.
- September 8: The Treaty of San Francisco ends the Occupation of Japan and formally concludes hostilities between Japan and the US.
- September 18: Release date of the acclaimed science fiction film The Day the Earth Stood Still.
- October 26: Winston Churchill becomes Prime Minister of the United Kingdom.

=== 1952 ===
- February 6: Queen Elizabeth II becomes Monarch of the Commonwealth realms.
- May: Bonn–Paris conventions end allied occupation of West Germany.
- May 2: The first passenger jet flight route opens between London and Johannesburg.
- June 28: Establishment of Miss Universe.
- July 23: Egyptian Revolution under Gamal Abdel Nasser overthrows King Farouk and ends British occupation.
- July 26: Death of Eva Perón.
- November 1: The United States successfully detonates the first hydrogen bomb, codenamed "Ivy Mike", at Eniwetok Atoll in the Marshall Islands in the central Pacific Ocean, with a yield of 10.4 megatons.
- Development of the first effective polio vaccine by Jonas Salk.
- The Mau Mau Uprising begins in Kenya.
- The Slansky Trial in Czechoslovakia.

=== 1953 ===
- January 20: Dwight D. Eisenhower is inaugurated as President of the United States.
- March 5: Death of Stalin.
- April 25: Discovery of the three-dimensional structure of DNA.
- May 29: First ascent of Mount Everest.
- June 2: Coronation of Elizabeth II.
- June 16–17: An East German Uprising leads to the arrest and execution of Lavrentiy Beria; power struggle begins between Georgy Malenkov and Nikita Khrushchev.
- July 27: End of the Korean War.
- August 19: Mohammed Mossadeq deposed in Iran.
- October 23: ABS-CBN first began broadcasting.
- November 9: Independence of Cambodia.
- The first color television is produced.

=== 1954 ===
- April 12: The song Rock Around the Clock, by Bill Haley and His Comets, brings rock and roll to the American mainstream.
- May 17: The Supreme Court of the United States decides Brown v. Board of Education, ordering an end to racial segregation in public schools.
- July 29: J. R. R. Tolkien publishes The Fellowship of the Ring, the first volume of The Lord of the Rings.
- August 1: First Indochina War ends.
- September 3: First Taiwan Strait Crisis begins.
- September 14: The Soviet Union generates first electricity by nuclear power.
- October 23: The Western European Union is established.
- November 1: Algerian War begins.
- November 3: Godzilla is released in Japan.
- Two Miami-based franchisees, David Edgerton and James McLamore, purchase the company "Insta-Burger King" and rename it "Burger King".

=== 1955 ===
- February 24: Formation of the Central Treaty Organization.
- April 12: The Salk polio vaccine having passed large-scale trials earlier in the United States, receives full approval by the Food and Drug Administration.
- April 18: Death of Albert Einstein.
- April 18–24: Bandung Conference.
- May 1: First Taiwan Strait Crisis ends.
- May 14: Signing of the Warsaw Pact.
- August 18: First Sudanese Civil War begins.
- After winning the power struggle that followed Stalin's death two years earlier, Nikita Khrushchev assumes control of the Soviet Union.
- Antimatter first produced.

=== 1956 ===
- January 1: Independence of Sudan from Britain.
- March 7: The United States recognises Morocco's independence from France
- March 20: Independence of Tunisia from France.
- March 23: Pakistan becomes a republic.
- May 9: The first Eurovision is held in Switzerland.
- October 29–November 7: Nasser's nationalisation of the Suez Canal triggers the Suez Crisis.
- November 11: The Hungarian Uprising crushed by Soviet troops.
- Construction of Brasília, the new capital of Brazil to replace Rio de Janeiro, begins.

=== 1957 ===
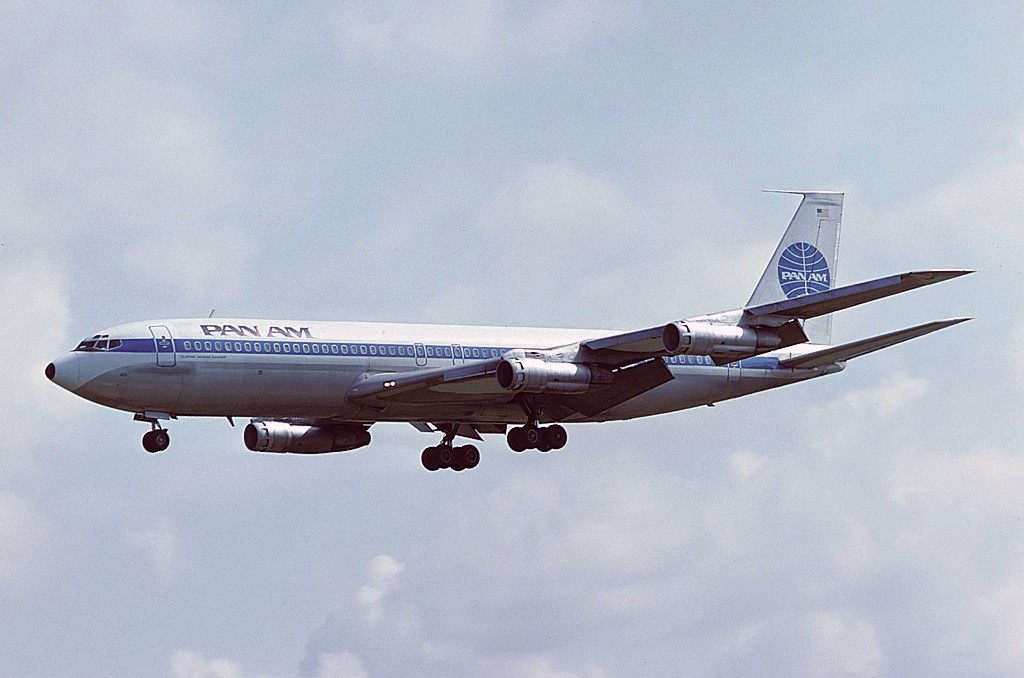
Boeing 707 jet airliner introduced in 1957

- January 10: Harold Macmillan becomes Prime Minister of the United Kingdom.
- March 6: Independence of Ghana from Britain.
- March 17: Philippine President Ramon Magsaysay and 24 others are killed in a plane crash.
- March 25: Treaty of Rome, which would eventually lead to the European Union.
- August 31: Independence of the Federation of Malaya.
- October 4: Launch of Sputnik 1 and the beginning of the Space Age.
- November 3: Laika becomes the first animal launched into Earth orbit.
- December 20: First flight of the Boeing 707.
- First prescription of the combined oral contraceptive pill.
- Beginning of the Asian flu in China, leading to a worldwide pandemic that lasts until the following year.

=== 1958 ===
- May 31: Pizza Hut founded.
- May: May 1958 crisis in France.
- July 29: NASA formed.
- July–October: 1958 Lebanon crisis.
- August 23: Federal Aviation Administration formed.
- August–September: Second Taiwan Strait Crisis.
- October 2: Guinea gains independence from France.
- October 4: French Fifth Republic established, with Charles de Gaulle as its first president.
- October 28: John XXIII becomes Pope.
- November: Campaign for Nuclear Disarmament (CND) founded. CND's symbol, the peace sign, is first used.
- Invention of the optical disc and the cassette tape.
- Start of the Great Leap Forward in China.

=== 1959 ===
- January 1: Cuban Revolution ends.
- January 3: Admission of Alaska, the 49th state, into the United States.
- March 9: Mattel's Barbie doll debuts in the United States.
- February 19: Independence of Cyprus.
- March 10–23: Uprising in Tibet against China leads to the exile of the Dalai Lama.
- August 21: Admission of Hawaii, the 50th state, into the United States.
- October 7: The USSR probe Luna 3 sends back the first ever photos of the far side of the Moon.
- November 1: Beginning of the Vietnam War, which lasts until 1975.
- World population reaches three billion.
- Laotian Civil War begins.
- Great Chinese Famine begins in China.
- First documented AIDS cases.
- By this time, the GULAG has been effectively disbanded, after over a million recorded deaths.

== 1960s ==
=== 1960 ===
- January 22: First crewed descent to the deepest point on Earth, the Mariana Trench.
- March 21: The Sharpeville Massacre, in which the police opened fire against a protesting crowd at a police station in the South African township of Sharpeville in Transvaal, resulting in 69 deaths and 180 injuries.
- April 21: Construction of Brasília, Brazil's new capital, finished.
- May 1: 1960 U-2 incident sparks deterioration in relations between superpowers.
- May 9: The birth control pill becomes commercially available.
- May 16: Construction of the first laser.
- May 22: An earthquake in Valdivia, Chile of magnitude 9.4 to 9.6, the highest ever recorded, causes 1,000 to 6,000 deaths.
- Sirimavo Bandaranaike becomes Prime Minister of Ceylon and the first female prime minister in the world.
- September 18–25: The first edition of the Summer Paralympic Games is hosted in Rome.
- September 30: The first episode of The Flintstones animated television series.
- October 12: Inejiro Asanuma, a Japanese socialist politician, is assassinated during a broadcast on TV.
- November 8: The 1960 United States presidential election marks the first televised debates between presidential candidates.
- European Free Trade Association formed.
- Year of Africa: Independence of 17 African nations.
- Khrushchev withdraws Soviet cooperation with China, initiating the Sino-Soviet split.
- Mau Mau Uprising ends.
- The Beatles form in Liverpool.

=== 1961 ===
- January 17: The assassination of Patrice Lumumba begins the Congo Crisis.
- January 20: John F. Kennedy is inaugurated as President of the United States.
- April 12: Yuri Gagarin, flying the Vostok 1 spacecraft as part of the Vostok program, becomes the first human in space.
- April 17–20: Bay of Pigs Invasion by Cuban exiles ends in failure.
- May 25: In an address to Congress, John F. Kennedy declares the United States' objective of "landing a man on the Moon and returning him safely to the Earth" by the end of the decade. This would be in fact achieved by the Apollo Project, despite many challenges and much doubt.
- August 13: Construction of the Berlin Wall.
- September 18: UN Secretary General Dag Hammarskjöld dies in a plane crash.
- The Great Leap Forward ends in China after the deaths of roughly 20–45 million people.
- The Portuguese Colonial War begins with the Angolan War of Independence.

=== 1962 ===
- March 1: Marvel Comics superhero Hulk has its first appearance in The Incredible Hulk.
- March 19: The Algerian War ends with the independence of Algeria.
- June 5: Marvel Comics superhero Spider-Man has its first appearance in Amazing Fantasy.
- July 2: Walmart founded in Rogers, Arkansas, by Sam Walton.
- September 23: The first episode of The Jetsons animated television series.
- September 26: A coup ends the Mutawakkilite Kingdom of Yemen, establishing the Yemen Arab Republic and starting the North Yemen Civil War.
- October 11: The Second Vatican Council is opened by Pope John XXIII.
- October 16–29: The Cuban Missile Crisis nearly causes nuclear war.
- October–November: The Sino-Indian War, caused by a border dispute in Aksai Chin, ends with a Chinese victory.

=== 1963 ===
- January 1: Premiere of the Astro Boy anime, the first to be broadcast overseas.
- January 20: Indonesia–Malaysia confrontation begins.
- March–April: Birmingham campaign and its Children's Crusade, key events in the 1954-1968 Civil rights movement
- March 22: The Beatles' first record, "Please Please Me", and the beginnings of the British Invasion.
- May 8: Beginning of the Buddhist crisis in South Vietnam during the Vietnam War.
- May 27: Bob Dylan releases The Freewheelin' Bob Dylan.
- June 21: Paul VI becomes Pope.
- July 26: Launch of the first geostationary satellite, Syncom 2.
- August 28: Martin Luther King Jr. delivers "I Have a Dream" speech at the March on Washington for Jobs and Freedom.
- November 2: 1963 South Vietnamese coup: Arrest and assassination of Ngo Dinh Diem, the South Vietnamese President.
- November 22: Assassination of John F. Kennedy. Vice President Lyndon B. Johnson assumes office as President of the United States.
- December 10–12: Independence of Kenya and Zanzibar and creation of Malaysia.

=== 1964 ===
- January 12: Zanzibar Revolution overthrows Afro Shiraz ruling class; Zanzibar merges with Tanganyika to form Tanzania.
- March 31–April 1: A coup d'état establishes a military dictatorship in Brazil.
- March 27: The Great Alaska Earthquake has a magnitude of 9.2 and lasted almost three minutes resulting in the death of approximately 131 people.
- May 27: Colombian armed conflict begins.
- July 2: Civil Rights Act abolishes segregation in the USA.
- July 4: Rhodesian Bush War begins.
- July 6: Independence of Malawi.
- August 2: The Gulf of Tonkin incident led to the escalation of U.S. military involvement in the Vietnam War.
- August 27: The live-action/animated musical feature film Mary Poppins.
- September 21: Independence of Malta.
- October 14: Leonid Brezhnev ousts Khrushchev and assumes power in the Soviet Union.
- October 16: China detonates its first nuclear weapon.
- November 28: NASA launches the Mariner 4 space probe from Cape Kennedy toward Mars to take television pictures of that planet in July 1965.

=== 1965 ===
- January 24: Death of Winston Churchill.
- February 21: Assassination of Malcolm X.
- March 17: The Voting Rights Act of 1965, inspired by the Selma to Montgomery marches.
- April 24: Dominican Civil War: Forces loyal to former president Juan Bosch overthrow current leader Donald Reid Cabral.
- April 26: Establishment of Rede Globo, now the largest TV network in Brazil and Latin America and the second-largest in the world after ABC.
- May 18: Israeli spy Eli Cohen is hanged in Damascus.
- August 9: Singapore gains independence.
- August 30: Bob Dylan releases Highway 61 Revisited.
- August–September: Second Indo-Pakistani War.
- September 30: 30 September Movement in the Indonesia.
- November 24–25: Congo Crisis ends; Joseph Mobutu becomes dictator of the Congo.
- December 8: Second Vatican Council is closed by Pope Paul VI.
- Beginning of the anti-Communist purge in Indonesia, which killed up to 500,000 people.

=== 1966 ===
- May 16:
  - The Beach Boys release Pet Sounds.
  - China's Cultural Revolution begins.
- August 11: The Indonesia–Malaysia confrontation ends.
- September 30: Independence of Botswana.
- October 4: Independence of Lesotho.
- October 21: The Aberfan disaster, the catastrophic collapse of a colliery spoil tip (pile of waste coal mining material) in Aberfan, Wales results in 144 deaths.
- November 30: Independence of Barbados.
- Joseph Weizenbaum, a German computer scientist at MIT, completes ELIZA, the first chatbot.

=== 1967 ===
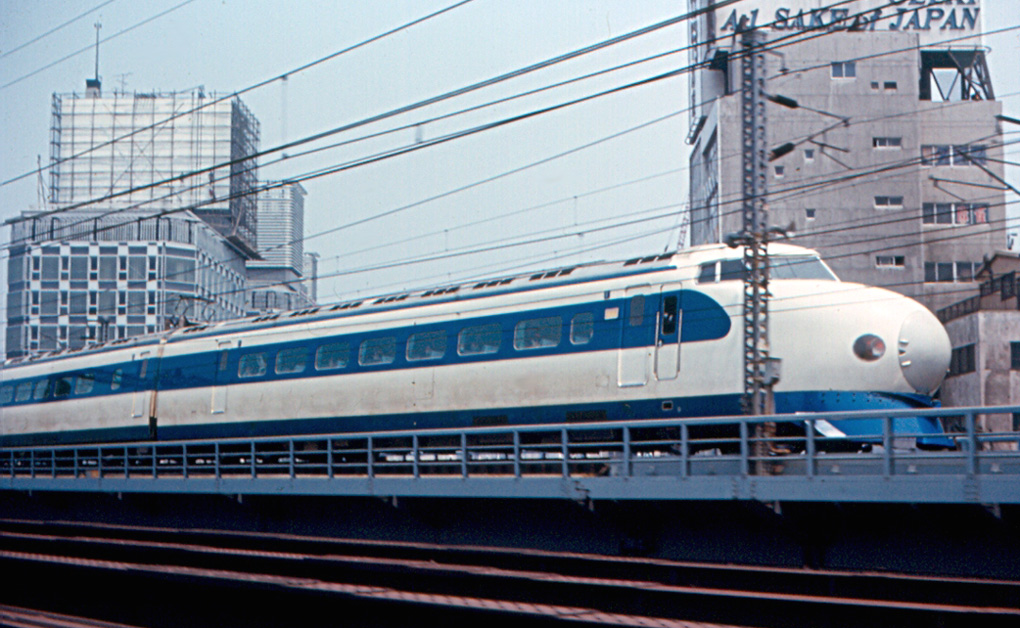
A 0 series Shinkansen high-speed rail set in Tokyo, May 1967

- January 27: Apollo 1 astronauts Gus Grissom, Ed White and Roger B. Chaffee killed in a cabin fire during launch rehearsal at Cape Kennedy Air Force Station Launch Complex 34
- April 21: Greek military coup establishes a military dictatorship led by Georgios Papadopoulos. The dictatorship ends in 1974.
- June 5–10: The Six-Day War, a conflict between Israel and Arab states that resulted in Israel occupying the Gaza Strip, the Sinal Peninsula, the West Bank and the Golan Heights.
- July 6: Attempted secession of the Republic of Biafra from Nigeria triggers the Nigerian Civil War.
- July 17: Death of John Coltrane, American jazz saxophonist, clarinettist and composer.
- August 8: Association of Southeast Asian Nations (ASEAN) founded.
- May 26: The Beatles release their landmark album Sgt. Pepper's Lonely Hearts Club Band.
- October 21: The March on the Pentagon becomes a major event in public opposition to the Vietnam War
- December 17: Australian Prime Minister Harold Holt disappears while swimming at Cheviot Beach, Victoria.
- First high-speed rail introduced in Tokyo.
- Mid-year: Summer of Love, in which as many as 100,000 people, mostly young people sporting hippie fashions of dress and behavior, converged in San Francisco's neighborhood of Haight-Ashbury.

=== 1968 ===
- January–March: Protests erupt in the United States, Europe and Latin America.
- January–August: Prague Spring in Czechoslovakia crushed by the Eastern Bloc military intervention.
- January–September: The Tet Offensive occurs in South Vietnam.
- March 12: Mauritius gains independence from the United Kingdom.
- March 16: My Lai massacre, a mass murder and rape of unarmed South Vietnamese civilians by U.S. troops in the Vietnam War.
- March 21: Battle of Karameh in Jordan (part of the War of Attrition between Israel and Arab states).
- April 4: Assassination of Martin Luther King Jr.
- June 5: Assassination of Robert F. Kennedy
- August 23: 1968 Democratic National Convention protests ("The whole world is watching")
- August 27: First World Constituent Assembly, took place in Interlaken, Switzerland and Wolfach, Germany
- September 6: Swaziland gains independence from Great Britain
- September: Zond 5 travels to the Moon with the first lifeforms to reach Earth's satellite
- December: Apollo 8 orbits the Moon with three NASA astronauts, becoming the first human spaceflight mission to enter the gravitational influence of another celestial body.
- Another new strain of a flu in Hong Kong spreads again.
- The Troubles begin in Northern Ireland.
- The Years of Lead, a period of social turmoil, political violence, and upheaval in Italy, begin.
- Palestinian insurgency in South Lebanon begins.

=== 1969 ===
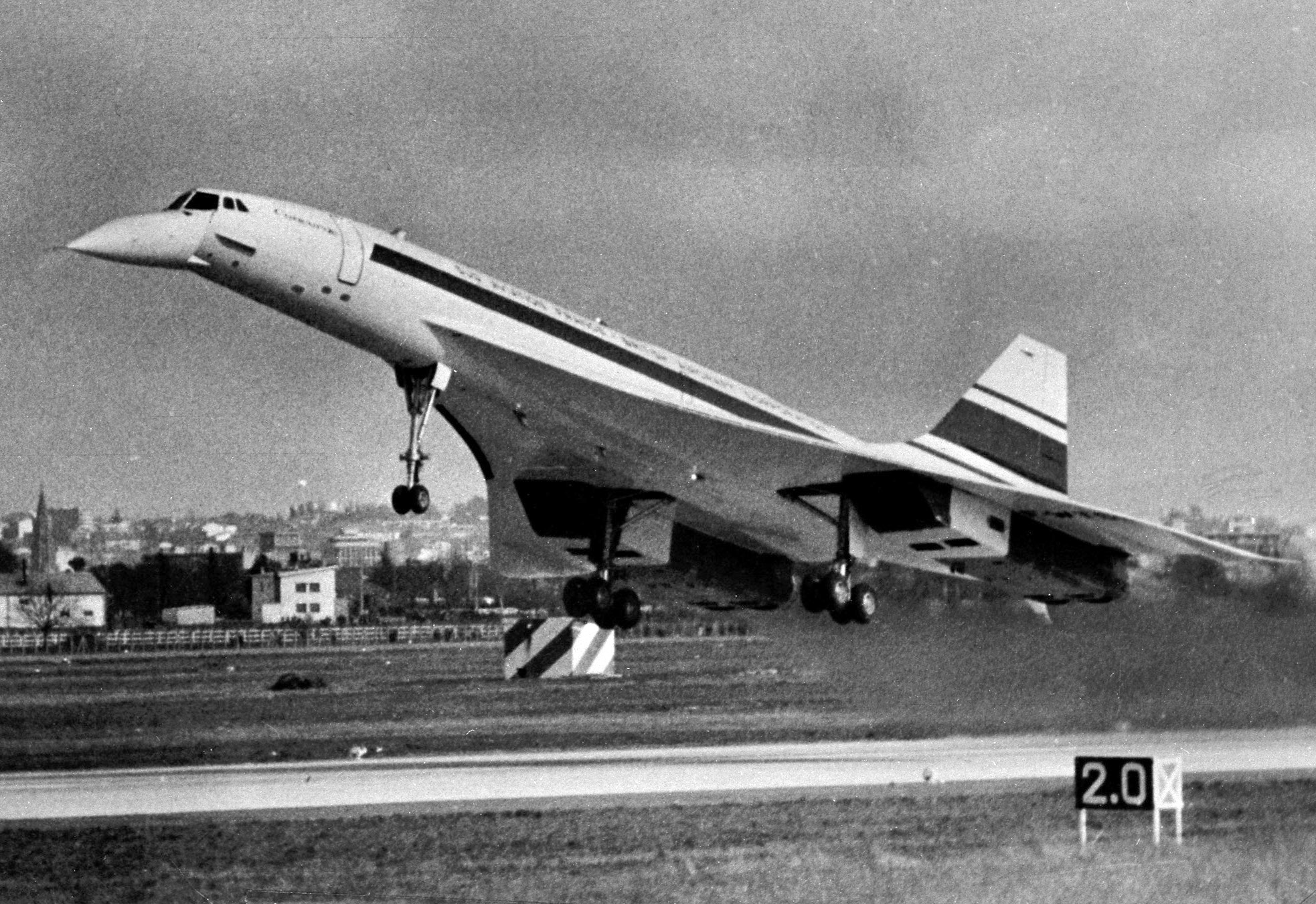
Concorde 001 first flight in 1969

- January 13: Samsung Electronics founded in Suwon, South Korea.
- January 20: Richard Nixon is inaugurated as President of the United States.
- March 2: Concorde 001 flies from the first time, from Toulouse, piloted by André Turcat.
- March–September: Sino-Soviet border conflict.
- April 28: Charles de Gaulle resigns as President of France after a referendum on political reform is voted down.
- June 28–July 3: The Stonewall riots in New York City instigate the gay rights movement.
- July 20: Apollo 11 Moon landing, in which Neil Armstrong and Buzz Aldrin become the first two humans on the Moon.
- August 8–9: The Manson Family Murders – Under Charles Manson's orders, his followers, the "Manson Family" cult, enter the home of Hollywood actress Sharon Tate and murder her and four others.
- August: The Woodstock festival in Bethel, New York, attracts an audience of more than 400,000.
- September 1: Muammar Gaddafi overthrows King Idris of Libya in a coup d'état and establishes the Libyan Arab Republic.
- September 13: The first episode of Scooby-Doo, Where Are You! animated television series.
- October 29: Creation of Advanced Research Projects Agency Network (ARPANET), the earliest incarnation of the Internet.
- November 10: Sesame Street premieres its debut episode.

== 1970s ==
=== 1970 ===
- January 15: The Nigerian Civil War ends with the reintegration of the Republic of Biafra with Nigeria after ~3 million deaths.
- January 22: Maiden flight of the Boeing 747.
- February 18: The Chicago Seven are found not guilty of conspiring to incite riots at the 1968 Democratic National Convention.
- March 5: Ratification of the Treaty on the Non-Proliferation of Nuclear Weapons.
- April 1: U.S. president Richard M. Nixon signs Public Health Cigarette Smoking Act.
- April 10: Break-up of the Beatles.
- April 11: Apollo 13 (Jim Lovell, Fred Haise, Jack Swigert) is launched toward the Moon.
- July 12: Thor Heyerdahl's papyrus boat Ra II arrived in Barbados, bringing an end to its 3,200 mi (5,100 km) journey across the Atlantic Ocean.
- September 6: Black September in Jordan begins, lasting until mid-1971.
- October–December: FLQ seizes hostages, causing Prime Minister Pierre Elliot Trudeau of Canada to issue the War Measures Act.
- October 5: The Public Broadcasting Service (PBS) began broadcasting as a successor to National Educational Television (NET) in the United States.
- October 15: Anwar Sadat becomes President of Egypt.
- November 3–13: The Bhola Cyclone kills 500,000 people in East Pakistan.
- December 1: North Yemen Civil War ends.
- December 14–19: 1970 Polish protests.
- December 18: Establishment of Airbus.
- Containerisation adopted globally, massively boosting global trade.

=== 1971 ===
- January 25: Idi Amin seizes power in Uganda.
- March 26: Bangladesh Liberation War and Bangladesh genocide occur, independence of Bangladesh from Pakistan precipitates Third Indo-Pakistani War.
- April 20: National Public Radio (NPR) airs its first broadcast.
- July 5: The Twenty-sixth Amendment to the United States Constitution, formally certified by President Richard Nixon, lowers the voting age from 21 to 18.
- July 17: Black September in Jordan ends.
- August 9–10: Internment begins in Northern Ireland.
- October 27: Joseph Mobutu renames The Republic of the Congo Zaire.
- November 15: Intel releases the world's first microprocessor, the Intel 4004.
- December: Third Indo-Pakistani War.
- Nixon shock removes gold back-up for the US Dollar triggering export of inflation from rich to poor nations.
- COINTELPRO officially ends.
- Greenpeace founded.

=== 1972 ===
- January: Sheikh Mujibur Rahman returns to Bangladesh from imprisonment in Pakistan.
- January 30: Northern Ireland's Bloody Sunday.
- February 21–28: U.S. president Richard M. Nixon makes an unprecedented 8-day visit to the People's Republic of China and meets with Mao Zedong.
- March 27: The First Sudanese Civil War ends.
- May 8: The airplane serving Sabena Flight 571 from Brussels to Lod, Tel Aviv is hijacked by four members of the Black September Organization, a Palestinian terrorist group, resulting in 3 deaths and 3 injuries.
- May 26: Richard Nixon and Leonid Brezhnev sign the SALT I treaty in Moscow, as well as the Anti-Ballistic Missile Treaty and other agreements.
- May 30: Lod Airport massacre.
- September 5–6: The Munich massacre, perpetrated by the Black September terrorist organization and aimed at the Israeli Olympic team, results in 17 total deaths.
- September 21: Martial law declared in the Philippines by President Ferdinand Marcos.
- November 29: The arcade game Pong, the first commercially successful video game, is released.
- Release of A Computer Animated Hand, one of the first ever computer animations.

=== 1973 ===
- January 1: Denmark, Ireland and the United Kingdom joins the European Communities.
- January 22: The Supreme Court of the United States decides Roe v. Wade.
- March 1: Pink Floyd's album The Dark Side of the Moon is released in the UK.
- May 3: Construction of the Sears Tower (later renamed to Willis Tower) completed.
- May 14: The first space station, Skylab, is launched.
- September 11: 1973 Chilean coup d'état.
- October: 1973 oil crisis.
- October 6–25: Yom Kippur War.
- December 3: Pioneer 10 sends back the first close-up images of Jupiter.
- 1973–1975 recession begins.

=== 1974 ===
- March 29:
  - First close-up images of Mercury by Mariner 10.
  - The Terracotta Army of Qin Shi Huang is discovered at Xi'an, China.
- April 25: Carnation Revolution in Portugal begins transition to democracy.
- July–August: The Turkish invasion of Cyprus leads to the creation of the Northern Cyprus.
- August 8–9: Watergate scandal: Resignation of Richard Nixon; Vice President Gerald Ford assumes office as President of the United States, the first person not elected as either president or vice president to take the role.
- September 12: Emperor Haile Selassie I of Ethiopia is overthrown in a military coup. Beginning of the Ethiopian Civil War.
- November 24: Discovery of "Lucy" (Australopithecus afarensis) in Ethiopia.
- Dirty War begins in Argentina.
- World population reaches four billion.

=== 1975 ===
- January: Altair 8800, the first commercially successful personal computer, is released.
- April 4: Microsoft founded in Albuquerque, New Mexico, by Bill Gates and Paul Allen.
- April 13: Bus massacre in Lebanon triggers the Lebanese Civil War which lasts until 1990
- April 17: The Cambodian Civil War ends with victory for the Khmer Rouge. Cambodian genocide begins.
- April 30: The Fall of Saigon ends the Vietnam War.
- June 25: Prime Minister Indira Gandhi declares a state of emergency in India, suspending civil liberties and elections.
- August 1: The Helsinki Accords, which officially recognize Europe's national borders and respect for human rights, are signed in Finland.
- November 11: Angola declares independence from Portugal and Angolan Civil War erupts.
- November 20: Death of Francisco Franco.
- November 22: Juan Carlos I becomes King of Spain.
- December 7: Indonesian invasion of East Timor begins.
- The Killing Fields murders begin.

=== 1976 ===
- March 24: 1976 Argentine coup d'état leads to a military dictatorship in Argentina.
- April 1: Steve Wozniak invents the Apple I and Steve Jobs then convinces Wozniak to sell the system, giving birth to Apple Computer.
- June 16–18: Around 20,000 students took part in the Soweto uprising during Apartheid in South Africa.
- July 4: Operation Entebbe, a successful counter-terrorist hostage-rescue mission carried out by commandos of the Israel Defense Forces (IDF) at Entebbe Airport in Uganda.
- September 9:
  - Death of Mao Zedong.
  - Release of VHS (Video Home System) in Japan.
- October 6: End of Cultural Revolution.
- Church Committee, a U.S. Senate select committee that investigated abuses by the CIA, NSA, FBI and Internal Revenue Service (IRS).
- First outbreak of the Ebola virus in Zaire.

=== 1977 ===
- January 20: Jimmy Carter is inaugurated as President of the United States.
- February 9: Queen Alia of Jordan is killed in helicopter crash.
- March 27: The Tenerife disaster in the Canary Islands, with 583 fatalities, marks the deadliest accident in aviation history.
- March–May: Shaba I conflict involves Safari Club.
- May 25: Star Wars is released and quickly becomes the highest-grossing film of all time.
- June 16: Second World Constituent Assembly took place in Innsbruck, Austria
- June 27: Djibouti gains independence from France.
- June 30: Second World Constituent Assembly established a Provisional World Government
- July 13: Somalia declares war on Ethiopia setting off the Ethio-Somali War.
- August 20: Voyager 2 launched by NASA.
- September 5: Voyager 1 launched by NASA.
- September 5: German Autumn: Red Army Faction abduction of Hanns Martin Schleyer.
- October 19: Suicide of members of Baader-Meinhoff Group and murder of Hanns Martin Schleyer ends crisis in West Germany.
- October 26: The last wild case of smallpox is eradicated by the WHO.
- November 19: Egyptian president Anwar Sadat becomes the first Arab leader to visit Israel in the hopes of establishing peace between the two countries.
- Introduction of the first mass-produced personal computers.

=== 1978 ===
- February 5–7: The Northeastern United States blizzard of 1978 hits the New England region and the New York metropolitan area, killing about 100, and causing over US$520 million in damage.
- March 14: 1978 South Lebanon conflict.
- April 27: The War in Afghanistan begins with the Saur Revolution.
- June 19: Garfield's first comic strip, originally published locally as Jon in 1976, goes into nationwide syndication.
- June 22: Discovery of Pluto's moon Charon.
- July: Louise Brown is the first child successfully born after her mother received in vitro fertilisation treatment.
- August 26: John Paul I becomes pope.
- September 17: The Camp David Accords are signed between Israel and Egypt.
- September 28: John Paul I dies, his papacy being one of the shortest in history.
- October 1: Independence of Tuvalu from Britain.
- October 9: The Uganda–Tanzania War begins.
- October 16: John Paul II becomes pope.
- November 18: Jim Jones's New religious movement, the Peoples Temple, ends in the organized mass killing and suicide of 920 people in Jonestown.
- November 27: San Francisco Mayor George Moscone and City Supervisor Harvey Milk are assassinated by former Supervisor Dan White.
- December 18: Deng Xiaoping commences the reform and opening up.
- December 25: The Cambodian-Vietnamese War begins.
- December 29: The current Constitution of Spain comes into effect, which for some marks the completion of the Spanish transition to democracy.
- Beginning of the Nicaraguan Revolution.
- Invention of artificial insulin.

=== 1979 ===
- January 7: The Vietnamese invasion of Kampuchea ends Cambodia's Khmer Rouge regime.
- February–March: Sino-Vietnamese War.
- February 11: The Iranian Revolution ends. Shah Reza Pahlavi is overthrown and forced into exile.
- March 16: Central Treaty Organization dissolves.
- March 28: The Three Mile Island nuclear accident, a partial meltdown of reactor number 2 of Three Mile Island Nuclear Generating Station (TMI-2) in Dauphin County, Pennsylvania, near Harrisburg, and subsequent radiation leak.
- May 4: Margaret Thatcher becomes the first female prime minister of the United Kingdom.
- June: Arrival of Pope John Paul II in Poland, eventually sparking the Solidarity movement.
- June 3: The Uganda–Tanzania War ends with defeat for Uganda and the exile of Idi Amin.
- June 11: Death of John Wayne.
- October 15: Beginning of the Salvadoran Civil War.
- October 26: Assassination of Park Chung Hee, President of South Korea.
- November 4: The Iran hostage crisis begins.
- November–December: Insurgensts seize the Grand Mosque in Mecca.
- December 12: The Rhodesian Bush War ends.
- December 24: The Soviet–Afghan War begins with the Soviet invasion of Afghanistan.
- Implementation of China's one-child policy.
- 1.7 million people known to have been murdered in the Killing Fields.
- The Contra War phase of the Nicaraguan Revolution begins.
- The 1979 oil crisis becomes the second one since 1973.

== 1980s ==
=== 1980 ===
- April 18: Independence of Rhodesia, which becomes Zimbabwe.
- May 8: WHO announces the eradication of smallpox.
- May 18: 1980 eruption of Mount St. Helens in Skamania County, state of Washington, leaves approximately 57 deaths and $1 billion of property damage.
- May 22: Release of Pac-Man, the best-selling arcade game.
- June 1: Launch of Cable News Network (CNN).
- July 1: Adoption of "O Canada" as the national anthem of Canada.
- July 30: Independence of Vanuatu.
- August 31: Solidarity union forms at Poland's Gdańsk Shipyard under Lech Wałęsa, and begins agitation for greater personal freedoms.
- September 22: Beginning of the Iran–Iraq War.
- November 13: Voyager 1 takes the first close-up pictures of Saturn.
- December 8: Murder of John Lennon.
- Internal conflict in Peru begins.
- Ugandan Bush War begins.
- Soviet-Afghan War continues.
- Invention of the Rubik's Cube.

=== 1981 ===
- January 1: Greece joins the European Communities.
- January 20:
  - Ronald Reagan is inaugurated as President of the United States.
  - Iran releases the 52 U.S. hostages held in Tehran after 444 days.
- March 30: Assassination attempt on U.S. president Ronald Reagan.
- April 12: First orbital flight of the Space Shuttle.
- May 13: Pope John Paul II assassination attempt.
- June 5: The AIDS epidemic officially begins in the United States, having originated in Africa; making this to be an ongoing pandemic.
- June 7: Operation Opera, a surprise airstrike conducted by the Israeli Air Force on an unfinished Iraqi nuclear reactor near Baghdad.
- August 1: Launch of MTV.
- August 12: IBM Personal Computer released.
- October 6: Assassination of Anwar Sadat.
- December 13: Martial law in Poland begins.

=== 1982 ===
- February 2–28: The Hama massacre in Syria, a conflict between Syria and the Muslim Brotherhood, results in a decisive Syrian victory and about 10,000 deaths.
- April 25: Israel withdraws from Sinai Peninsula.
- April–June: Falklands War.
- June 6: First Israeli invasion of Lebanon begins.
- September 4: Provisional World Parliament of the Provisional World Government first session convened.
- September 18: the Sabra and Shatila massacre of thousands of Palestinians during the Lebanese Civil War.
- October 1: Sony releases the world's first commercially sold CD player, the Sony CDP-101.
- November 10–15: Death of Leonid Brezhnev; Yuri Andropov becomes General Secretary of the Communist Party of the Soviet Union.
- November 30: Michael Jackson releases his landmark album Thriller, the best-selling album of all time.
- December 7: The first execution by lethal injection takes place in Texas.

=== 1983 ===
- January 1: Independence of Brunei.
- March 23: Ronald Reagan announces the Strategic Defense Initiative, a proposed missile defense system to protect the United States from attack by ballistic nuclear missiles.
- April 18: The Bombing of U.S. Embassy in Beirut results in 63 deaths.
- June 5: Second Sudanese Civil War begins.
- July 14: Nintendo releases Mario Bros.
- July 23: Sri Lankan Civil War begins.
- August 21: Benigno Aquino Jr., Philippine opposition leader, is assassinated in Manila just as he returns from exile.
- September 1: Korean Air Lines Flight 007, a scheduled flight from New York City to Seoul via Anchorage, Alaska, is shot down by a Soviet Su-15 interceptor, resulting in 269 fatalities and no survivors. This leads to the declassification of GPS development.
- September 17: Vanessa Lynn Williams becomes the first African-American to be crowned Miss America, in Atlantic City, New Jersey.
- October 23: The Beirut barracks bombing results in the deaths of 307 people, hastening the removal of international peacekeeping forces in Lebanon.
- October 25–29: Invasion of Grenada by the United States.
- December 10: End of dictatorship in Argentina.

=== 1984 ===
- June 1–10: Indian Armed Forces launch Operation Blue Star against Sikh separatists in Punjab, India, leading to thousands of civilian deaths.
- October 9: The first episode of Thomas the Tank Engine & Friends television series.
- October 31: Assassination of Indira Gandhi, Indian prime minister.
- December 3: Bhopal disaster.
- December 19: Sino-British Joint Declaration agrees to hand Hong Kong back to China by 1997.
- Operation Moses, the covert evacuation of Ethiopian Jews from Sudan during a civil war that caused a famine.
- The human immunodeficiency virus (HIV) is recognized as the cause of HIV/AIDS, and research on zidovudine and other treatments gets underway.
- Beginning of the 1983–1985 famine in Ethiopia and the 1984–85 UK miners' strike.

=== 1985 ===
- March 11: Mikhail Gorbachev becomes General Secretary of the Communist Party of the Soviet Union.
- March 15: End of military leadership in Brazil.
- June: End of 1982 Lebanon War.
- July 13: Live Aid.
- August 20: Beginning of the Iran–Contra affair, a political scandal in the United States that occurred during the second term of the Reagan Administration involving the sale of arms to the Khomeini government of the Islamic Republic of Iran.
- September 1: 73 years after its infamous disaster, the wreck of the Titanic is found off the coast of Newfoundland by a joint French–American expedition led by Jean-Louis Michel of IFREMER and Robert Ballard of the Woods Hole Oceanographic Institution.
- September 19: An earthquake in Mexico City, magnitude 8.0, kills from 5,000 to 45,000 people.
- October 1: Release date of the Macintosh 128K, the first successful mass-market personal computer to feature a graphical user interface, built-in screen, and mouse.
- November 13: The Armero tragedy, in which 20,000 people die following the eruption of the Nevado del Ruiz stratovolcano in Tolima, Colombia.
- November 20: Windows 1.0, the first Microsoft Windows operating system, released.
- First use of DNA fingerprinting.

=== 1986 ===
- January 1: Portugal and Spain joins the European Communities.
- January 12–24: South Yemen Civil War.
- January 24: First close-up images of the planet Uranus
- January 28: The Space Shuttle Challenger breaks apart 73 seconds into its flight, killing all seven crew members aboard.
- February 22–25: The People Power Revolution leads to the end of the dictatorship of Ferdinand Marcos in the Philippines.
- February 28: Assassination of Olof Palme, Prime Minister of Sweden.
- March: Return of Halley's Comet.
- April 15: U.S. planes bomb Libya in Operation El Dorado Canyon.
- April 26: The Chernobyl disaster in Ukraine kills about 100 people.
- October 11–October 12: A breakthrough in nuclear arms control at the Reykjavík Summit.
- October 19: Samora Machel, the first president of Mozambique, dies in a plane crash.
- November 3: The Iran–Contra affair publicly announced.

=== 1987 ===
- April 14: Turkey submitted an application for membership to join the European Economic Community.
- April 19: The Simpsons debut in The Tracey Ullman Show.
- June 10–29: The June Democratic Struggle, a nationwide pro-democracy movement in South Korea, leads to democratic reforms and an end to authoritarian rule.
- September 10: The Battle of Cuito Cuanavale, Angola begins and further intensifies the South African Border War.
- September 13: A radioactive contamination accident in Goiânia, Brazil, leaves 249 people contaminated, four of which die.
- September 15: Huawei founded in Shenzhen, China by Ren Zhengfei.
- October 19: Stock market crash of 1987.
- December: The antidepressant drug fluoxetine (marketed as Prozac) becomes commercially available.
- December 8:
  - The First Intifada between Israel and Palestine begins.
  - The Intermediate-Range Nuclear Forces Treaty is signed in Washington, D.C., by U.S. president Ronald Reagan and Soviet leader Mikhail Gorbachev.
- World population reaches five billion.

=== 1988 ===
- January 2: Beginning of the perestroika ("restructuring"), a political movement for reformation within the Communist Party of the Soviet Union during the 1980s associated with Gorbachev and his glasnost ("openness") policy reform.
- January 13: Lee Teng-hui takes control of Taiwan and oversee end of martial law and full democratization of island.
- March 16: The Halabja chemical attack is carried out by Iraqi government forces, killing thousands.
- July 6: The Piper Alpha oil rig in the North Sea catches fire and explodes, killing 165.
- August 20: End of the Iran–Iraq War.
- October 5: Chile's Augusto Pinochet loses a national plebiscite on his rule.
- November 2: Morris worm, first computer virus distributed through the Internet.
- November 15: Israeli–Palestinian conflict; beginning with the independent State of Palestine being proclaimed from Algiers.
- December 2: Benazir Bhutto elected Prime Minister of Pakistan months after restoration of civilian rule in the wake of Muhammad Zia-ul-Haq's death in plane crash.
- December 7: Spitak earthquake in Armenia.
- December 21: Pan Am Flight 103 is destroyed by a bomb and falls over Lockerbie, Scotland, killing 259 people on board, leaving no survivors, and 11 in town.
- 1988 Polish strikes.
- Myanmar Armed Forces launch a military coup, ending the 8888 uprising.
- The First Nagorno-Karabakh War begins.
- Construction of the Channel Tunnel begins.
- Invasive species, Zebra mussels, found in the Great Lakes system.

=== 1989 ===
- Revolutions of 1989 bring down Communist and authoritarian regimes around the world.
- January 7: Emperor Shōwa (Hirohito) dies; his son, Akihito (the Emperor Heisei) becomes Emperor of Japan.
- January 20: George H. W. Bush is inaugurated as President of the United States.
- February 2: Alfredo Stroessner is overthrown in Paraguay. End of dictatorship.
- February 14: Fatwa issued against Salman Rushdie.
- February 15: End of the Soviet war in Afghanistan.
- March 24: The oil tanker Exxon Valdez spills 10.8 million US gallons of crude oil after striking a reef, causing severe damage to the environment.
- April–June: Tiananmen Square Massacre, in which troops armed with assault rifles and accompanied by tanks fired at student-led demonstrations held in Tiananmen Square, Beijing, resulting in an undisclosed number of deaths (estimated in hundreds to thousands).
- June 3: Ruhollah Khomeini dies; Ali Khamenei becomes Supreme Leader of Iran.
- June 4:
  - 1989 Polish legislative election although the elections were not entirely democratic, they led to the formation of a government led by Tadeusz Mazowiecki and a peaceful transition to democracy in Poland and elsewhere in Central and Eastern Europe.
  - 1989 Tiananmen Square massacre. A crackdown takes place in Beijing on the army's approach to the square, and the final stand-off in the square is covered live on television.
- June 5: An unknown Chinese protester, "Tank Man", stands in front of a column of military tanks on Chang'an Avenue in Beijing, temporarily halting them, an incident which achieves iconic status internationally through images taken by Western photographers.
- August 25: Voyager 2 makes its closest approach to Neptune and its largest moon, Triton.
- October 17: The 6.9 M_{w} Loma Prieta earthquake shakes the San Francisco Bay Area and the Central Coast, killing 63.
- November 9: Fall of the Berlin Wall; the Revolutions of 1989 and the collapse of the Soviet Bloc begin in Europe, which leads to the end of the Cold War.
- November 15–December 17: The first direct Presidential election in Brazil since 1960.
- November 24: The Communist government of Czechoslovakia falls during the Velvet Revolution.
- December 17: The first episode of The Simpsons premieres on Fox.
- December 20: The United States invasion of Panama begins.
- December 24: The First Liberian Civil War begins.
- December 25: Romanian Revolution: Trial and execution of Nicolae and Elena Ceaușescu in Romania.

== 1990s ==
=== 1990 ===
- January 31: The first McDonald's in Moscow, Russian SFSR opens 8 months after construction began on May 3, 1989
- February 11: Nelson Mandela is released from Victor Verster Prison outside Cape Town, South Africa after 27 years as a political prisoner.
- March 11: End of the dictatorship of Augusto Pinochet in Chile.
- March 27: The United States begins broadcasting Radio y Televisión Martí to Cuba.
- April 24–May 20: Launch of the Hubble Space Telescope.
- April 7: Scandinavian Star, a Bahamas-registered ferry, catches fire en route from Norway to Denmark, leaving 158 dead.
- May 22: North and South Yemen unify to form the Republic of Yemen.
- June 21: The 7.4 M_{w} Manjil–Rudbar earthquake affects northern Iran with a maximum Mercalli intensity of X (Extreme), killing 35,000–50,000, and injuring 60,000–105,000.
- August 2–4: Gulf War begins.
- September 6: Myanmar Armed Forces place Aung San Suu Kyi under house arrest.
- October 3: German reunification.
- November 2: Transnistria War begins.
- December 20: Tim Berners-Lee publishes the first web site, which described the World Wide Web project.
- The Contra War ends.
- The Intergovernmental Panel on Climate Change releases its first assessment report, linking increases in carbon dioxide in the Earth's atmosphere, and a resultant rise in global temperature, to human activities.

=== 1991 ===
- February 28: The Gulf War ends in US withdrawal and a failed uprising.
- March 3: A video captures the beating of motorist Rodney King by Los Angeles police officers. Four Los Angeles police officers are indicted on March 15 for the beating.
- March 23: Beginning of the Sierra Leone Civil War.
- May 16: Elizabeth II becomes the first British monarch to address the U.S. Congress during a 13-day royal visit in Washington, D.C.
- May 21: Assassination of Rajiv Gandhi, Indian prime minister.
- May 24–25: Operation Solomon, a covert Israeli military operation to airlift Ethiopian Jews to Israel.
- June 12–15: Mount Pinatubo erupts with a Volcanic Explosivity Index of 6 and reduces global temperatures.
- June 27–July 7: The Ten-Day War in Slovenia begins the Yugoslav Wars.
- July 1: President George H. W. Bush nominates the controversial Clarence Thomas for the Supreme Court of the United States to replace Thurgood Marshall, who had announced his retirement.
  - The world's first GSM telephone call is made in Finland.
- July 10: Boris Yeltsin becomes the first President of Russia.
- July 11: A solar eclipse of record totality occurs in the Northern hemisphere. It is seen by 20 million people in Hawaii, Mexico, and Colombia.
- July 22: Tracy Edwards escapes Jeffrey Dahmer's apartment, leading to his arrest and ending his killing spree.
- August 19: Soviet coup attempt of 1991: A coup occurs in response to a new union treaty to be signed on August 20.
- August 25: Michael Schumacher, regarded as one of the greatest Formula One drivers in history, makes his Formula One debut at the Belgian Grand Prix.
- September 17: North and South Korea are admitted to the United Nations.
- September 19: Ötzi the Iceman is found in the Alps.
- October 3: Speaker of the U.S. House of Representatives Tom Foley announces the closure of the House Bank by the end of the year after revelations that House members have written numerous bad checks.
- October 5: Linus Torvalds launches the first version of the Linux kernel.
- October 30–November 1: Madrid Conference of 1991.
- Early November: Tropical Storm Thelma lashes into Eastern Visayas, leaving 8,000 people dead.
- December 26:
  - Dissolution of the Soviet Union and independence of 15 former Soviet republics.
  - Beginning of the Algerian Civil War.
- Beginning of the Somali Civil War.
- 1991 Sino-Soviet Border Agreement.

=== 1992 ===
- January 9: Discovery of the Kuiper belt and the first extrasolar planets.
- January 16: End of the Salvadorian Civil War.
- February 7: The Maastricht Treaty is signed, creating the European Union.
- February 17: A court in Milwaukee, Wisconsin, sentences serial killer Jeffrey Dahmer to 15 terms of life in prison. Dahmer is murdered in prison 2 years later.
- March 12: Mauritius becomes a republic, abolishing the monarchy and the office of governor-general.
- April 3: End of communism in Albania.
- April 6: The Bosnian War begins.
- April 22: Fuel leaking into a sewer causes a series of explosions in Guadalajara, Mexico; 215 are killed, 1,500 injured.
- April 29–May 4: Los Angeles riots over the acquittal of those involved in the beating of Rodney King.
- May 13: Falun Gong is introduced by Li Hongzhi in China.
- June 8: The first World Oceans Day is celebrated, coinciding with the Earth Summit held in Rio de Janeiro, Brazil.
- July 21: Transnistria War ends.
- August 24–28: Hurricane Andrew kills 65 and causes $26.5 billion in damages in the Bahamas and the United States.
- October 4: El Al Flight 1862, in which a Boeing 747 cargo aircraft of the then state-owned Israeli airline El Al crashes into the Groeneveen and Klein-Kruitberg flats in the Bijlmermeer neighbourhood of Amsterdam, resulting in 43 deaths.
- October 6: Lennart Meri becomes the first President of Estonia after regaining independence.
- December 18: The South Korean presidential election is won by Kim Young-sam, the first non-military candidate elected since 1961.
- October 31: Microsoft released Windows 3.1.
- November 25: The animated feature film Aladdin premiere.

=== 1993 ===
- January 1: Velvet Divorce between Czech Republic and Slovakia.
- January 20: Bill Clinton is inaugurated as President of the United States.
- February 26: 1993 World Trade Center bombing.
- February 28–April 19: The Waco siege, the law enforcement siege of the compound that belonged to the Seventh-day Adventist religious sect Branch Davidians near Waco, Texas, carried out by the U.S. federal government, Texas state law enforcement, and the U.S. military, which results in a gunfight, a fire at the compound and 86 deaths.
- March 12: Several bombs explode in Bombay, India, killing 257 and injuring hundreds more.
- May 24: Independence of Eritrea.
- August 24: 1993 child sexual abuse accusations against Michael Jackson.
- September 13: Oslo accords end First Intifada between Israel and Palestine.
- September 26: The first mission in Biosphere 2 ends after two years.
- October 3–4: Battle of Mogadishu leaves over 3,000-4,000 people dead.
- October 4: Tanks bombard the Russian parliament, while demonstrators against President Boris Yeltsin rally outside.
- November 1: The Maastricht Treaty comes in to effect.
- November 30: Release date of Schindler's List.
- December 2: Colombian drug lord Pablo Escobar is gunned down by police.

=== 1994 ===
- January 1: Establishment of North American Free Trade Agreement (NAFTA).
- January 17: The 6.7 M_{w} Northridge earthquake strikes the Greater Los Angeles Area with a maximum Mercalli intensity of IX (Violent), leaving 57 people dead and more than 8,700 injured.
- February 25: Cave of the Patriarchs massacre in the West Bank, a shooting massacre carried out by American-Israeli Baruch Goldstein, which resulted in 30 deaths and 125 injuries.
- April 6: The assassination of Juvénal Habyarimana and Cyprien Ntaryamira triggers the Rwandan genocide.
- May–July: First Yemeni Civil War.
- May 6: Opening of the Channel Tunnel.
- May 10: End of apartheid in South Africa and election of Nelson Mandela.
- June 23: Release date of Forrest Gump.
- July 1: Plano Real introduces the new real currency in Brazil.
- July 5: Amazon founded in Bellevue, Washington, by Jeff Bezos.
- July 8–17: Death and state funeral of Kim Il-sung. Kim Jong-il becomes Supreme Leader of North Korea.
- September 19: Operation Uphold Democracy, a military intervention to remove the military regime installed by the 1991 Haitian coup d'état, begins, eventually restoring Jean-Bertrand Aristide to power
- September 28: The car ferry MS Estonia sinks in the Baltic Sea, killing 852 people.
- October 1: Palau gains independence from the United States.
- November 5: George Foreman wins the WBA and IBF World Heavyweight Championships by KO'ing Michael Moorer becoming the oldest heavyweight champion in history.
- December 11: The First Chechen War begins.
- December 14: Construction of the Three Gorges Dam begins in Hubei, China.
- Rise of a wave of Palestinian terrorist attacks in Israel.

=== 1995 ===
- January 1:
  - Establishment of the World Trade Organization.
  - Austria, Finland and Sweden join the European Union.
- January 17: A 6.9 M_{w} Great Hanshin earthquake strikes the southern Hyōgo Prefecture of Japan with a maximum Shindo of VII, leaving 5,502–6,434 people dead, and 251,301–310,000 displaced.
- March 14: Astronaut Norman Thagard becomes the first American to ride into space aboard a Russian launch vehicle (the Soyuz TM-21), lifting off from the Baikonur Cosmodrome in Kazakhstan.
- March 20: The Tokyo subway sarin attack, an act of domestic terrorism perpetrated by members of the doomsday cult movement Aum Shinrikyo (now Aleph), in which they released sarin, an extremely toxic synthetic compound, in five coordinated attacks, resulting in 13 deaths and 6,252 injuries.
- April 19: American terrorist Timothy McVeigh bombs the Alfred P. Murrah Federal Building in Oklahoma City.
- May 14: The Dalai Lama proclaims 6-year-old Gedhun Choekyi Nyima as the 11th reincarnation of the Panchen Lama.
- June 29: The Sampoong Department Store collapse, a structural failure in a department store in Seoul, South Korea, kills 502 people and injures other 1,445.
- July 11–22: The Srebrenica massacre of over 8,000 Bosniak Muslim men and boys.
- July 21: The Third Taiwan Strait Crisis begins.
- August–September: NATO bombing raids in Bosnia end the Bosnian War.
- August 24: Release date of Windows 95.
- September 3: eBay is founded by Pierre Omidyar.
- September 19: The Washington Post and The New York Times publish the Unabomber Manifesto.
- September 28: Oslo II Accord.
- October 3: O. J. Simpson is found not guilty of double murder for the deaths of former wife Nicole Simpson and Ronald Goldman in 1994.
- October 16: The Million Man March is held in Washington, D.C. The event was conceived by Nation of Islam leader Louis Farrakhan.
- November 4: Assassination of Yitzhak Rabin, Israeli prime minister and defence minister, by Yigal Amir, an Israeli right-wing extremist.
- November 22: Premiere of Toy Story, the first computer-animated feature film and the first Pixar Animation Studios film.
- December 14: The signing of the Dayton Accords put an end to the 3 1/2-year-long Bosnian War.
- The North Korean famine begins.

=== 1996 ===
- January 9–20: Serious fighting breaks out between Russian soldiers and rebel fighters in Chechnya.
- February 13: Nepalese Civil War begins.
- March 23: The Third Taiwan Strait Crisis ends.
- April 3: The FBI arrested Theodore Kaczynski, the suspected Unabomber at his cabin in Lincoln, Montana.
- April 28–29: The Port Arthur massacre in Tasmania, Australia leaves 35 people dead, leading to tighter gun regulations in Australia.
- May 10: A sudden storm engulfs Mount Everest with several climbing teams high on the mountain, leaving eight people dead. By the end of the month, at least four other climbers die in the worst season of fatalities on the mountain to date.
- May 11: After takeoff from Miami, a fire started by improperly handled oxygen canisters in the cargo hold of Atlanta-bound ValuJet Flight 592 causes the Douglas DC-9 to crash in the Florida Everglades, killing all 110 people on board.
- July 5: Dolly the sheep becomes the first successful cloned mammal.
- July 17: TWA Flight 800 crash.
- July 27: Centennial Olympic Park bombing.
- August 31: The First Chechen War ends.
- September 27: The Taliban government takes control of Afghanistan, creating the Islamic Emirate of Afghanistan.
- October 24: The First Congo War begins.
- November 1: Release of DVD in Japan.
- December 26: Killing of JonBenét Ramsey.
- End of dictatorship in Taiwan.
- Increasing terrorist attacks in Israel.

=== 1997 ===
- January–August: The Albanian civil unrest (Lottery Uprising), sparked by pyramid scheme failures, in which the government was toppled, with new parliamentary elections, and more than 2,000 people killed.
- February 4: 1997 Israeli helicopter disaster, when two Israeli Air Force transport helicopters ferrying Israeli soldiers into Israel's security zone in southern Lebanon collided in mid-air, killing all 73 Israeli military personnel on board.
- March 13: Island of Peace massacre, a mass murder attack that occurred at the Island of Peace on the Israeli-Jordanian border, in which 7 people were killed and 6 injured.
- March 24–26: 39 Heaven's Gate cultists commit mass suicide at their compound in San Diego, California.
- April 1: The first episode of Pokémon airs on TV Tokyo.
- April 22: A 126-day hostage crisis at the residence of the Japanese ambassador in Lima, Peru.
- May 17: Kabila ousts Mobutu; Zaire becomes the Democratic Republic of the Congo.
- June 21: The Women's National Basketball Association (WNBA) plays its first game at The Great Western Forum in Los Angeles.
- June 25: J. K. Rowling publishes Harry Potter and the Philosopher's Stone.
- July 1: Handover of Hong Kong from the United Kingdom to China.
- July 15: Fashion designer Gianni Versace is murdered by Andrew Cunanan.
- July 17: The F. W. Woolworth Company closes after 117 years in business.
- August 2: The First Liberian Civil War ends.
- August 29: Netflix is launched.
- August 31: Diana, Princess of Wales is killed in a car accident in Paris.
- November 17: 62 people are killed by 6 Islamic militants outside the Temple of Hatshepsut in Luxor, Egypt.
- Sound barrier broken on land.

=== 1998 ===
- February: Osama bin Laden publishes a fatwa against the West.
- February 3: A United States military pilot causes the deaths of 20 people near Trento, Italy, when his low-flying EA-6B Prowler severs the cable of a cable-car.
- February 28: A study led by Andrew Wakefield is published in The Lancet suggesting an alleged link between MMR vaccine and autism. Now known to be full of data manipulation, the study was instantly controversial and fueled the nascent anti-vaccination movement.
- April 10: The Good Friday Agreement brings an end to The Troubles in Northern Ireland.
- April 15: Death of Pol Pot.
- May 4–15: Riots in Indonesia, including incidents of mass violence, demonstrations, and civil unrest of a racial nature, result in the Fall of Suharto and the independence of East Timor.
- June 25: Microsoft released Windows 98.
- June 30: Joseph Estrada becomes President of the Philippines.
- July 17: Nicholas II of Russia and his family are buried in St. Catherine Chapel, 80 years after he and his family were killed by the Bolsheviks in 1918.
- August 2: The Second Congo War begins.
- August 7: Kenya and Tanzania bombings.
- August 15: Omagh bombing.
- September 4: Google is founded by Larry Page and Sergey Brin.
- October–November: Hurricane Mitch leaves more than 19,325 dead in Central America as a result of catastrophic flooding and mudslides.
- November 20: A Russian Proton rocket is launched from the Baikonur Cosmodrome in Kazakhstan, carrying the first segment of the International Space Station, the 21-ton Zarya Module.
- December 19: The impeachment of Bill Clinton begins as a result of the Clinton–Lewinsky scandal.
- The North Korean famine has killed an estimated 2.5 million people by this point.

=== 1999 ===
- January 1: Euro introduced to the international markets. Coins and banknotes enter circulation in participating countries in 2002.
- February 2: Hugo Chavez becomes President of Venezuela.
- April: A crisis in East Timor, which led to 1,400 deaths, begins.
- April 20: The Columbine High School massacre in Colorado, United States, causes 15 deaths.
- April 21: The Second Liberian Civil War begins.
- May 1: The first episode of SpongeBob SquarePants airs on Nickelodeon.
- May–July: The Fourth Indo-Pakistani War.
- June 11: The end of the Kosovo War ends the Yugoslav Wars.
- July 16: John F. Kennedy Jr. plane crash.
- August 26: The Second Chechen War begins.
- September 3–16: Russian apartment bombings kill more than 350 people.
- October 12: World population reaches 6 billion.
- October 31: EgyptAir Flight 990, travelling from New York City to Cairo, crashes off the coast of Nantucket, Massachusetts, killing all 217 on board.
- November 30: ExxonMobil founded.
- December 3: Tori Murden becomes the first woman to cross the Atlantic Ocean by rowboat alone, when she reaches Guadeloupe from the Canary Islands.
- December 20: Handover of Macau from the Portuguese Republic to the People's Republic of China after 442 years of Portuguese rule in the settlement.
- December 31:
  - Vladimir Putin becomes the President of Russia.
  - The U.S. turns over complete administration of the Panama Canal to the Panamanian Government, as stipulated in the Torrijos–Carter Treaties of 1977.

== 2000 ==
- January 1: The first day of the 3rd millennium is celebrated on New Year's Day; though with dispute.
- February 9: Torrential rains in Africa leads to flooding until March and kills 800 people.
- March 10: Dot-com bubble bursts, causing stock markets worldwide to crash.
- March 4: The Sony PlayStation 2 releases in Japan. The system became the highest-selling video game console in history.
- March 12: Pope John Paul II apologizes for the wrongdoings by members of the Roman Catholic Church throughout the ages.
- March 17: 778 members of the Movement for the Restoration of the Ten Commandments of God die in Uganda.
- March 26: Vladimir Putin is elected President of Russia.
- April 30: The Canonization of Faustina Kowalska occurs in the presence of 200,000 people and the first Divine Mercy Sunday celebrated worldwide.
- May 6: The British Army launches Operation Palliser which effectively ends the Sierra Leone Civil War.
- May 11: India becomes the second country to reach 1 billion people.
- May 25: Israeli withdrawal from Lebanon.
- June 13–15: First inter-Korean summit.
- June 17: A centennial earthquake (6.5 on the Richter scale) hits Iceland on its national day.
- July 1: The Øresund Bridge between Denmark and Sweden is officially opened for traffic.
- July 7: The draft assembly of Human Genome Project is announced at the White House by US president Bill Clinton, Francis Collins, and Craig Venter.
- July 11–25: The 2000 Camp David Summit, aimed at reaching a "final status" agreement between the Palestinians and the Israelis, was held between United States president Bill Clinton, Israeli prime minister Ehud Barak and Palestinian Authority chairman Yasser Arafat.
- July 14: A powerful solar flare, later named the Bastille Day event, causes a geomagnetic storm on Earth.
- July 25: Concorde Air France Flight 4590 crashes in France, killing 113 including all people aboard.
- August 12: Russian submarine Kursk explodes, killing all 118 crew.
- September 13: Steve Jobs introduces the public beta of Mac OS X.
- September 26: The Greek ferry Express Samina sinks off the coast of the island of Paros; 80 out of a total of over 500 passengers perish in one of Greece's worst sea disasters.
- September 28: The Second Intifada begins.
- October 5: Yugoslav President Slobodan Milošević resigns following a revolution in Belgrade.
- October 12: al-Qaeda suicide bombs the USS Cole; 17 sailors are killed.
- November 2: International Space Station begins operations; its first crew, composed of three men, arrives.
- December 12: In Bush v. Gore, the United States Supreme Court declares George W. Bush President of the United States.
- December 25: The Luoyang Christmas fire at a shopping center in China kills 309 people.

== Horizontal timelines ==
=== 1850–present ===
Dates are approximate range (based upon influence), consult particular article for details
Modern Age Other

== See also ==
- 20th century in fiction
