= Clown diving =

Diving entertainment show

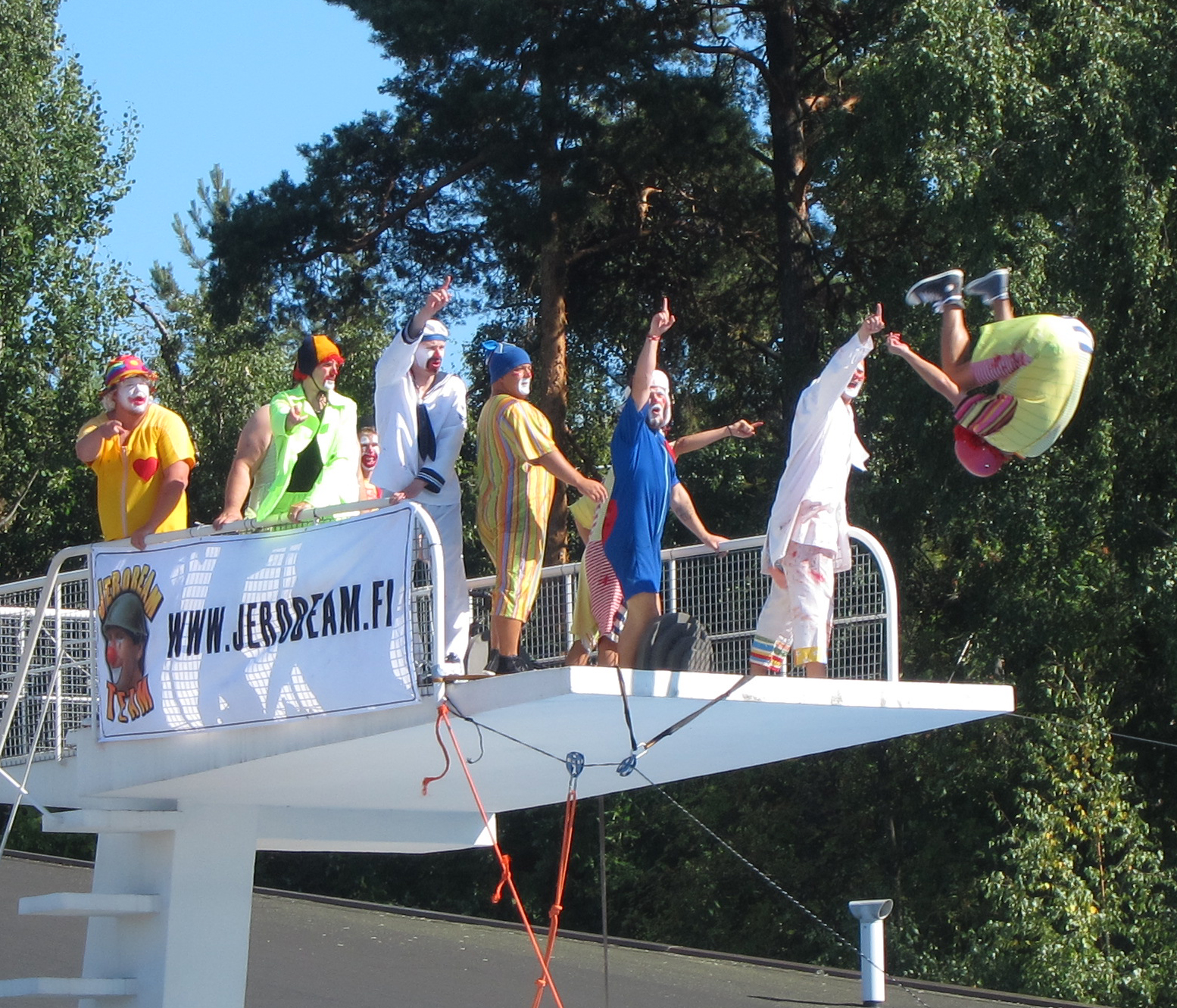
Jerobeam at a festival in Kotka, 2013

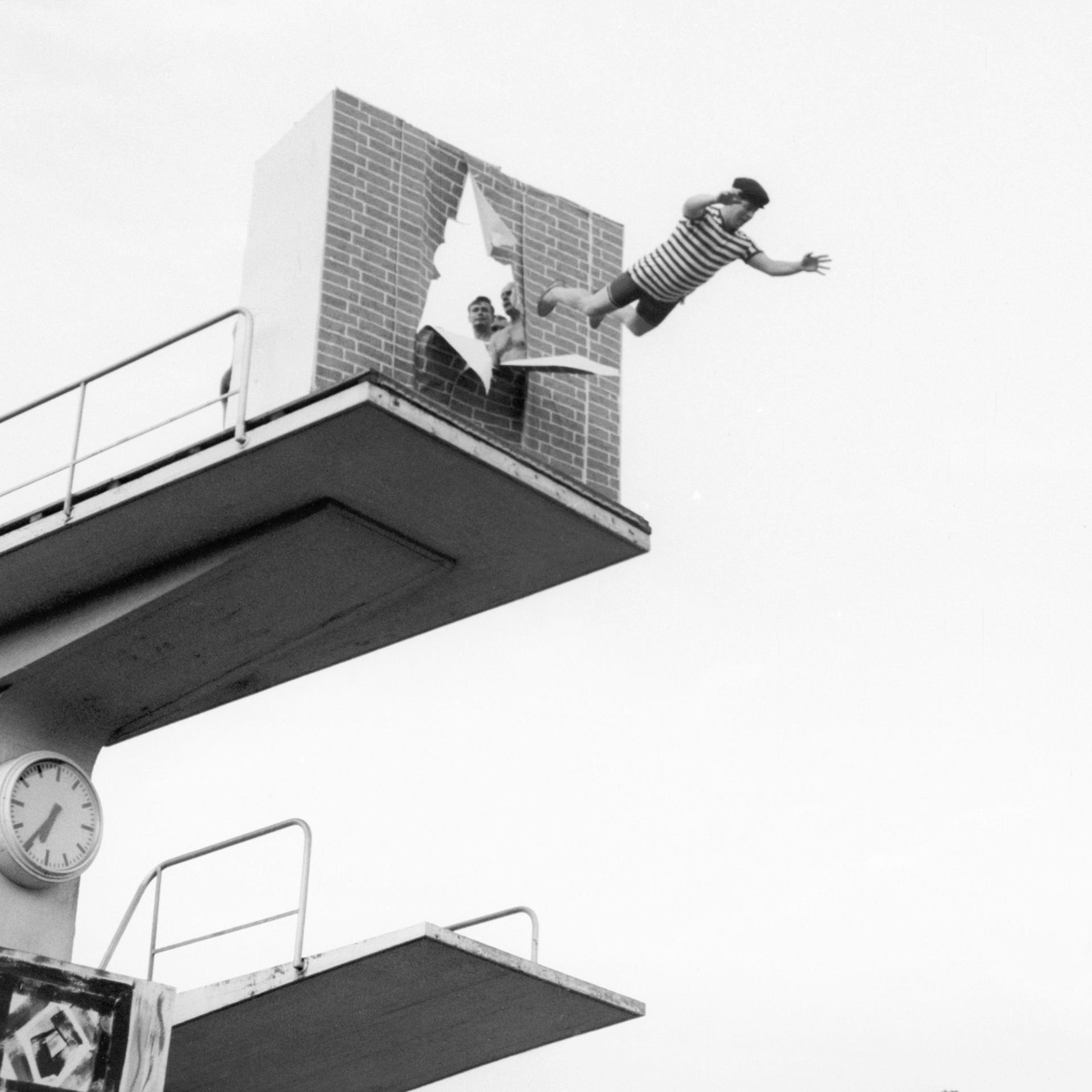
Simo Salminen, late 1950s

Clown diving or comedy diving is a performance in which experienced divers dressed as clowns or in some other comical attire perform tricks from diving platforms to the amusement of the audience.

Dana Kunze, an American champion high-diver, who operates water shows, such as the "Dueling Pirates", says that in comedy diving the most dangerous part is clowning: slipping on diving beams, ets.

== Notable comedy divers ==
At the 1924 Olympics, the pair Harold "Stubby" Kruger and Johnny Weissmuller performed comedy routines with a great success, with numerous encores, resulting in the ban of show diving from future olympics. Weissmuller would perform straight, proper dives, while Kruger, in clown's attire, followed him with hilarious imitations.

In early 1960s, American diving champion Dick Kimball toured with the future Hall of Fame diving coach Hobie Billingsley in a "comedy and acrobatic show" of diving.

Larry Griswold, an American gymnast and entertainer, a co-inventor of the modern trampoline, was also known as "The Diving Fool". His comedy routine, performed at various shows. In a 1951 Frank Sinatra Show, he acted as a slightly drunken man standing in for "Larry Griswold, Amateur Diving Champion", who cannot make the show himself due to celebrating a night before and saying that he is Larry's father and have taught him all his dives.

In Finland, the Jerobeam Salakyttä Team is a dedicated clown diving team, performing clown diving since 1969. In Finland and Norway clown diving competitions are held.

The first clown diving competitions were organized in 1950, by the Härveli Diving Club. In these early times they were organized up to eight times a year, as an avertisement of diving. The career of the Finnsh comic Simo Salminen started with clown diving, winning the Nordic Clown Jumping Championship in 1957.
