= United States Trampoline and Tumbling Association =

The United States Trampoline & Tumbling Association (U.S.T.A.) offers competitions in tumbling, trampoline and double-mini trampoline. It was founded in 1970. Starting with 200 members and one division, the U.S.T.A. now has 6000 members, nine divisions for tumbling, and six divisions for the double-mini trampoline and the trampoline. The U.S.T.A. offers scholarships to athletes, and has been an allied member of the Amateur Athletic Union since 1997.

By 1970, the sport of trampoline experienced tremendous growth in both numbers of participants and new private clubs opening up across the United States. Although the Amateur Athletic Union (AAU) remained the governing body for the sport; sponsoring annual national competitions and sanctioning athletes for international competitions, the AAU had limited involvement with youth programming.

In addition, a decision had been made by the United States Gymnastic Federation to exclude trampoline from their sanctioned gymnastics competitions.

In October 1970, George Nissen and Larry Griswold assembled a select group of thirty-three U.S. trampoline and tumbling coaches and asked them to collaborate on the formation of a new organization to support and promote the sport of trampoline and tumbling. The U.S.T.A., would work hand-in-hand with the AAU, which remained the governing body for the sport of trampoline.
