= Jerobeam Salakyttä Team =

Finnish clown diving team

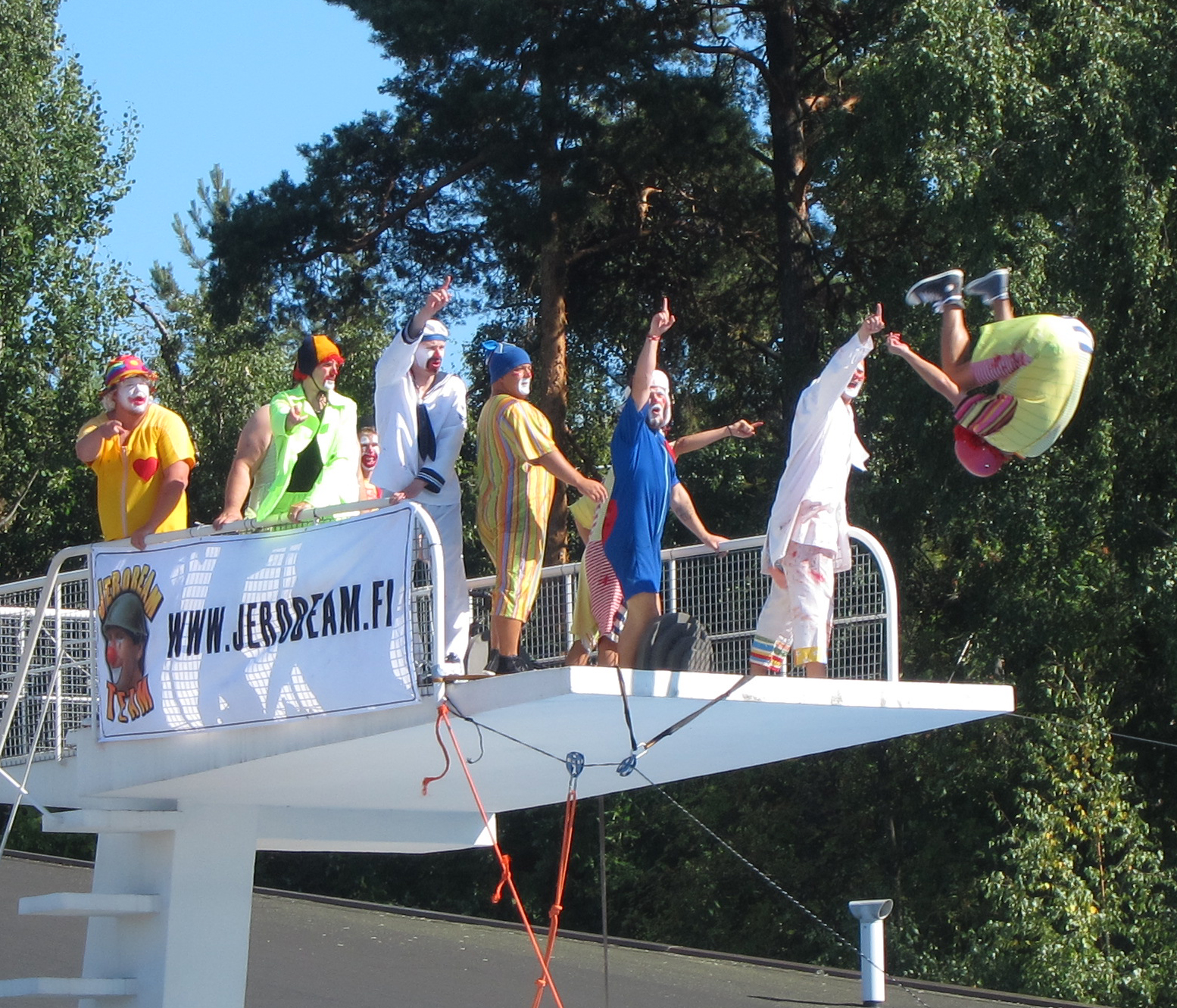
Jerobeam at a festival in Kotka, 2013

Jerobeam Salakyttä Team is a Finnish clown diving team. It was established by former Finnish diving champion Osmo Meskanen the 1969. "Jerobeam Salakyttä" (Note: "Jerobeam Salakyttä" is a funny nonsense name which may be translated from Finnish as "Undercover Jeroboam" or "Jeroboam the Poacher".) is the stage name of Meskanen.

In 2011 they were invited to the United States and produced a documentary Pellehypyn suurlähettiläät ("Clown Jumping Ambassadors") about their trip, in which they were teling their story and showing behind the scenes. They were invited by the McCormick Divers Booster Club, Long Beach, CA, debuting their show as a fundraiser for the club.

Over time the team composition changed. In particular, its founder retired in 1994.

The team took part in Finland vs. Sweden Clown Diving Competitions aired on TV and in a number TV shows in Sweden and Finland.
