= Dian Nissen =

American trampoline competitor (born 1961)

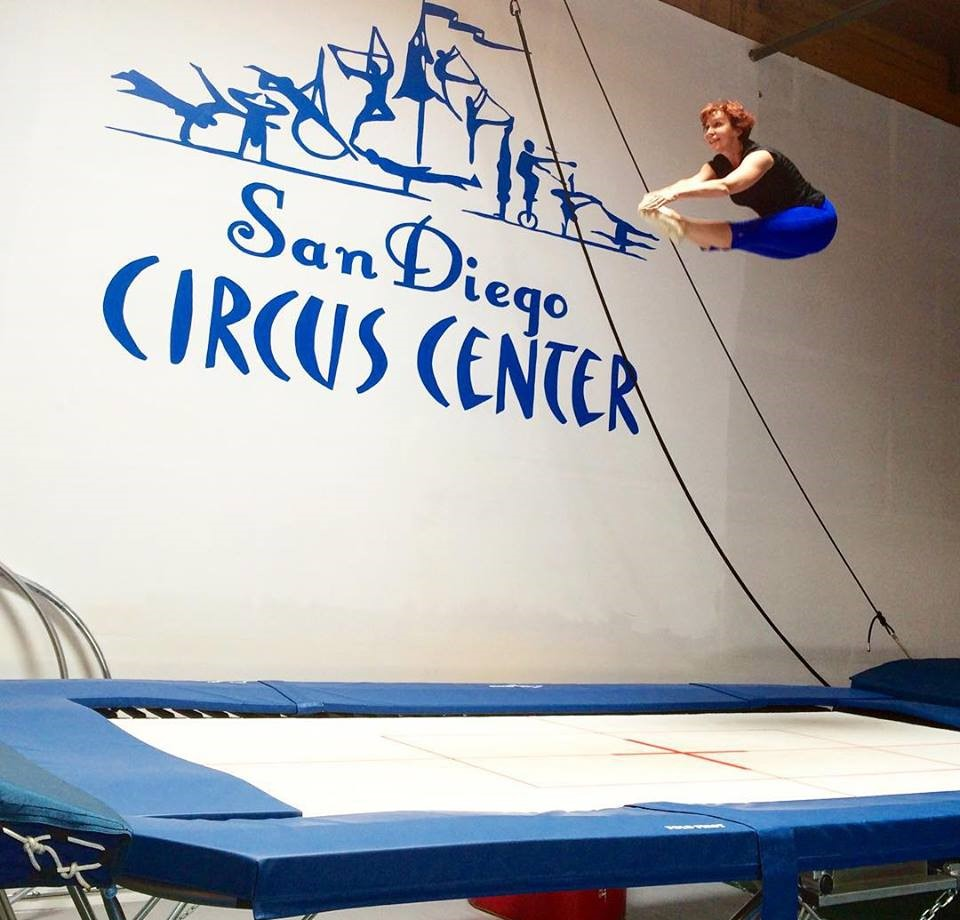
- Nissen, age 55, bouncing on a competition trampoline (2016)
- Born: January 1961 (age 65); Cedar Rapids, Iowa, U.S.
- Years active: 1981–present
- Parents: George Nissen; Annie Nissen

Dian Nissen (born January 1961) is a multiple world-title trampoline athlete and competitor, multiple U.S. Women’s Trampoline champion, AAU All-American, health and fitness expert, and entrepreneur. She is the daughter of George Nissen, the inventor of the modern-day trampoline.

== Trampoline ==
Nissen began her involvement with sports and fitness at an early age, becoming an AAU All-American (Amateur Athletic Union) by the time she was 16. She was the 1976 U.S. Women's Trampoline champion in all three trampoline events: Individual Trampoline, Synchronized Trampoline, and Double Mini-Trampoline. At the age of 15, she placed 4th at the 1976 Trampoline World Championships in Tulsa Oklahoma. For 47 years, no other U.S. woman placed at or higher than Dian Nissen at the Trampoline World Championships for the Individual Trampoline women's event. In 2023, Jessica Stevens surpassed that mark by placing 3rd at the 37th FIG Trampoline Gymnastics World Championships held in Birmingham, Great Britain. Ms. Stevens achievement attests to the high-level of trampoline competition and the challenge to medal at the world level. Nissen's playful sobriquet, Trampoline Diva, embodies her lifelong association with the trampoline beginning with her early childhood and continuing through to her years as a world-class trampolinist, national champion, trampoline safety expert, trampoline coach, trampoline entertainer, fitness trampoline Master Trainer, and safety expert on the trampoline park industry.

Along with her father and the support of his company, the Nissen Corporation, which at the time was the world's largest manufacturer of gymnastics equipment in the world, she promoted her father's invention of the trampoline and the sport of trampolining by performing hundreds of shows in the United States and around the world, and competing in trampoline competitions nationally and internationally.

Nissen continues her father George Nissen's lifelong work of promoting trampolining.

George Nissen promoted the sport of trampolining believing that one day it could become an Olympic sport. For decades, George endured naysayers that claimed "it would be the year 2000" before trampolining would make it to the Olympics. Ironically, the cynics were correct; trampolining debuted as an Olympic sport at the 2000 Summer Olympics in Sydney Australia. At 86 years old, George attended the 2000 Olympics accompanied by his daughter Dian Nissen. Eight years later, George was able to travel to Beijing, China for the 2008 Summer Olympics, with his daughter and grandson.

Dian Nissen has been referred to as the International Ambassador for Trampolines because of her continuing involvement with, and promotion of trampolines for fitness, health, sport and recreation around the world. She provides public awareness and education on trampoline safety and the history of the trampoline.

== Education and fitness career ==
A graduate of the University of Iowa, Nissen has been a member of the teaching faculty at the University of California, San Diego (UCSD) and the San Diego Community College District. She holds a Master of Science degree in Health Education and Exercise Science, and is a certified Health Coach and Group Fitness Instructor through the American Council on Exercise (Gold certification). She is also a continuing education provider for fitness professionals through the American Council on Exercise. With her father, she served as consultants to the California Governor's Council on Physical Fitness and Sports with Arnold Schwarzenegger, Chair, under Governor Pete Wilson. Together, they presented programs to schools and other organizations to promote physical activity and help improve the health of Californians.

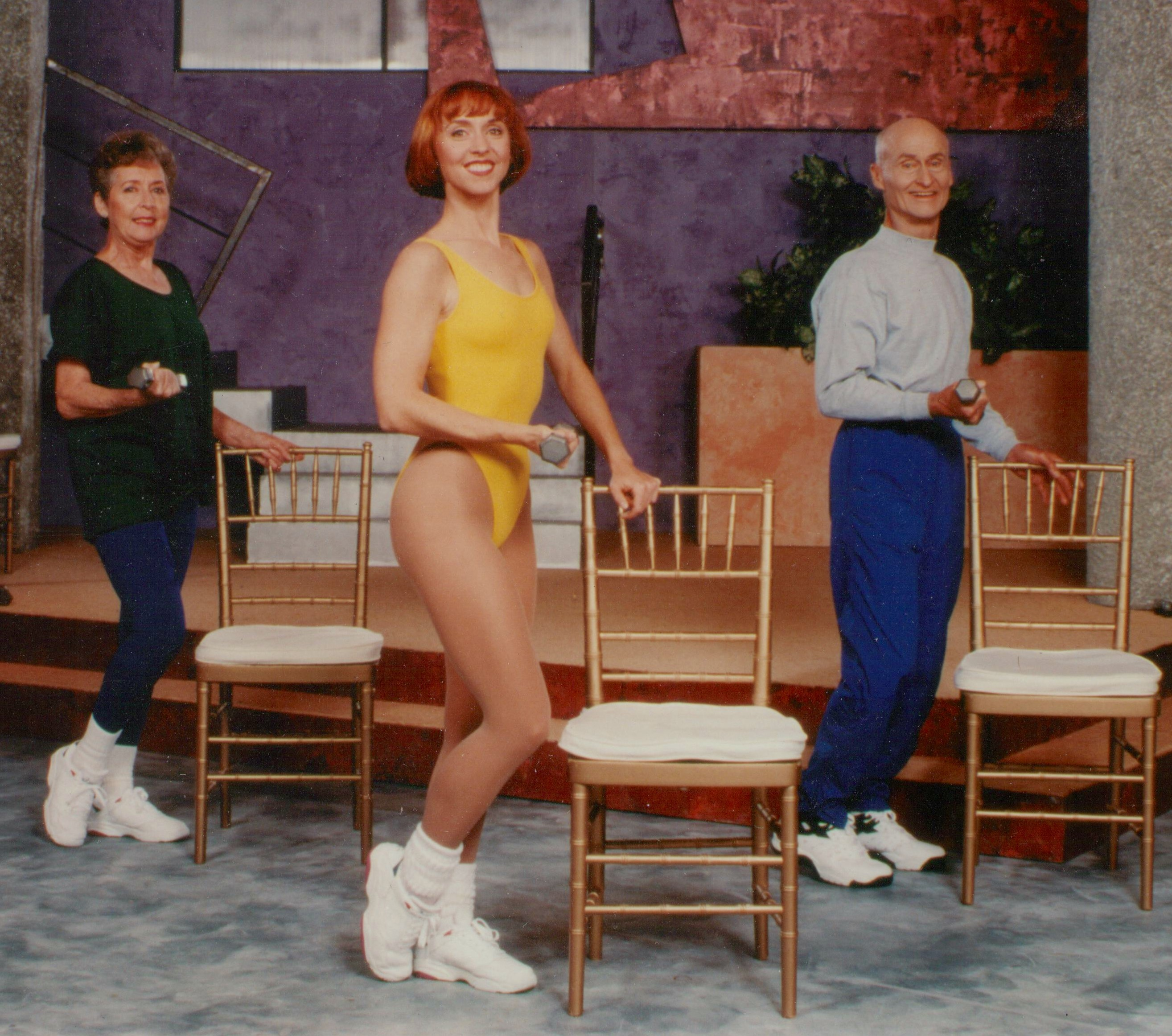
Dian Nissen, George Nissen, and Annie Nissen - Fresh Start video (1994)

Recognizing that seniors in general were under-served by the fitness industry, she founded Ageless Fitness in 1994. Nissen then expanded her mission to help people of all ages and abilities improve their fitness and health through exercise and education. She also presented workshops, master classes, instructor training, and mentored teachers. Her company is also involved in exercise video production and distribution. The first exercise video series in which she produced and starred in was geared towards older adults and those needing a lighter and gentler form of movement. The video, Fresh Start (1994), included her father, George Nissen, and her mother, Annie Nissen as part of the cast. Nissen is a Telly Award and National Mature Media Award winner for two of her older adult exercise videos. She is a Pilates professional and faculty member of Balanced Body Education that provides Pilates instructor training worldwide. She is also certified and trained in Pilates through Polestar Education, Physical Mind Institute, and Stott Pilates. Some of her specialty training and qualifications in Pilates include Studio series, Mat, Auxiliary Equipment, Props, Rehabilitation, Post‐Rehabilitation, Allegro Reformer, Osteoporosis, Pre‐ and Post‐Natal and Menopause, and Balanced Body Barre.

Dian teaches rebounding trampoline on rebounder fitness trampolines through her YouTube Channel Born To Bounce. She is the creator of The Born To Bounce Method™ — Rebounding for Strength, Balance, Health, and Joy at Every Age.

Nissen was one of the first fitness professionals to independently produce, distribute and star in a Pilates exercise video. Her first Pilates video, Mind Body Matwork, was cutting-edge at the time and consisted of elegant and effective movements evolved from the work of Joseph Pilates. The video was one of the first to incorporate the use of an elastic band to simulate moves that are also performed on the centerpiece of Pilates equipment—the Reformer. The video quickly became a bestseller on Amazon.com. Nissen is recognized as one of the foremost Pilates instructors in the U.S. Her exercise instruction is based on sound biomechanics and current knowledge of exercise physiology, producing safe and effective exercise routines.

Dian Nissen continues to be involved with trampolining. She is on the Board of Directors of the World Acrobatic Society (worldacro.com) whose purpose is to foster the growth, development and safety of various acrobatic disciplines along with preserving their histories. She is also a founding member of the Trampoline & Adventures Advisory Group whose purpose is to actively work within the trampoline park industry to promote and create awareness of trampoline safety and risk management through the creation of an industry-wide training and certification program. Nissen is a member of ASTM International and the Task Group involved with setting safety standards to protect consumers and developing construction standards for manufacturers. She is a member of USA Gymnastics and is a certified USA Gymnastics University Instructor. She is a USAG Coach specializing in Trampoline, Synchronized Trampoline and Double Mini-Trampoline. She owns Nissen Trampoline Academy in San Diego, California where she coaches recreational and competitive Team Trampoline.

Nissen speaks to businesses and organizations about the benefits of adopting long-term, healthy lifestyle habits. She is a women's health advocate and expert on women's wellness, fitness and achieving maximum health. She also offers health programs to business owners to reduce their healthcare costs and optimize performance.

== Awards and recognition ==
- United States Women’s Trampoline Champion (1976‐1980).
- World Age Group Champion in the Individual trampoline, Double-mini trampoline, synchronized trampoline, and Trampoline Spaceball.
- AAU All‐American.
- World Acrobatics Society Hall of Fame, Class of 2024 Trampoline/Tumbling
- Telly award winner (1998).
- National Mature Media Award winner (1998).
- Featured on CBS Sports Spectacular and ABC’s Wide World of Sports.
