= 1976 Trampoline World Championships =

The 9th Trampoline World Championships were held in Tulsa, Oklahoma, United States on July 3, 1976.

== Results ==
=== Men ===
==== Trampoline ====
Rank	Country	Gymnast	Points
Gold medal	Soviet Union	Yevgeny Janes	74.90
Gold medal	France	Richard Tison	74.90
Bronze medal	Soviet Union	Sergei Lobanov	74.40

==== Trampoline Synchro ====
Rank	Country	Gymnasts	Points
Gold medal	Soviet Union	Yevgeny Yakovenko; Yevgeny Janes	43.90
Silver medal	West Germany	Robert Schwebel; Werner Friedrich	39.90
Bronze medal	South Africa	R. Jansen; Steven Pelser	38.20

==== Double Mini Trampoline ====
Rank	Country	Gymnast	Points
Gold medal	United States	Ron Merriott	26.30
Silver medal	United States	Robie Bollinger	26.00
Bronze medal	South Africa	Derick Lotz	25.20

==== Tumbling ====
Rank	Country	Gymnast	Points
Gold medal	United States	Jim Bertz	48.375
Silver medal	United States	Ed Goodman	47.183
Bronze medal	United States	Kevin McKee	44.600

=== Women ===
==== Trampoline ====
Rank	Country	Gymnast	Points
Gold medal	Soviet Union	Svetlana Levina	69.90
Silver medal	Soviet Union	Natalia Moiseva	69.50
Bronze medal	Switzerland	Ruth Keller	69.40
4	United States	Dian Nissen	69.20

==== Trampoline Synchro ====
Rank	Country	Gymnasts	Points
Gold medal	Soviet Union	Svetlana Levina; Olga Starikova	38.60
Silver medal	United States	Leigh Hennessy; A. Thompson	38.50
Bronze medal	West Germany	Ute Scheile; Ute Luxon	38.40

==== Double Mini Trampoline ====
Rank	Country	Gymnast	Points
Gold medal	United States	Leigh Hennessy	24.80
Silver medal	United States	Denise Seal	24.10
Bronze medal	Canada	Nancy Bonham	20.30

==== Tumbling ====
Rank	Country	Gymnast	Point
Gold medal	United States	Tracey Long	46.085
Silver medal	United States	Nancy Quattrochi	45.210
Bronze medal	United States	Lisa Podojil	42.755

== Medal table ==
Rank	Nation	Gold	Silver	Bronze	Total
1	United States	4	5	2	11
2	Soviet Union	4	1	1	6
3	France	1	0	0	1
4	West Germany	0	1	1	2
5	South Africa	0	0	2	2
6	Canada	0	0	1	1
6	Switzerland	0	0	1	1
Totals (7 entries)		9	7	8	24
