= Larry Griswold =

American gymnast and entertainer (1905–1996)

Laurens V. Griswold (September 17, 1905 – August 24, 1996) was an American gymnast and entertainer who was involved in the early development of the trampoline. He was also a comedy diver, known as "The Diving Fool".

Griswold was a college level gymnast and tumbler while studying physical education at the University of Iowa. While coaching at an acrobatic school in New York, he enjoyed performing in vaudeville shows. However, he decided to return to Iowa to become a teacher and in 1931, he became a gymnastics coach at the University of Iowa where he met George Nissen who was also a skilled gymnast and tumbler.

In 1933, Griswold organized many of the skilled athletes at the university into a circus team, putting on shows. He also developed an act in the swimming pool which involved Griswold clowning and performing tricks on the diving board. This would later develop into an entertaining routine which he performed professionally for years. In one of his most famous routines he would pretend to be a drunken, uncoordinated man who was constantly staggering off of the diving board and its ladder as he ostensibly got ready for a big dive. Audiences would gasp as he repeatedly "fell" from the board only to seemingly catch himself at the last moment.

In 1943, Al Sheehan recruited Griswold to perform as part of the Aqua Follies, a water ballet show including diving acts.

Griswold and Nissen worked together to develop the first prototype trampoline. Later they set up a company, the Griswold-Nissen Trampoline & Tumbling Company, to manufacture trampolines. However, initially sales were slow and Griswold sold out as his entertainment career was starting to thrive. In 1945, he found that he had to limit his immersion in water for health reasons and so changed his routine to use a trampoline disguised as a swimming pool in his diving act. This allowed him to play a wider variety of venues.

In the 1950s and 1960s, he took his physical clowning and acrobatic act all across the United States becoming one of the top draws in show business. He also performed on television variety shows, including the Frank Sinatra Show, The Ed Sullivan Show, Hollywood Palace and the Jackie Gleason Show. He toured internationally performing lavish shows in the United Kingdom, France and Japan before settling down for several years as a regular performer in the Folies Bergère.

Griswold's interest in trampolining and education did not stop with the development of his entertainment career. In 1941, he wrote Trampoline Tumbling, the first textbook for the sport of trampolining. In 1971, with George Nissen, he founded the United States Tumbling & Trampoline Association (USTA). They honoured him by inducting him into their Hall of Fame and by the naming of the Griswold-Nissen Cup for outstanding trampolinists.

In 1973, Griswold had a fall while performing in Chicago and suffered a career-ending injury. His show continued with replacement performers he had trained in preparation for his retirement.
