= George Nissen =

American inventor of the modern trampoline (1914–2010)

George Peter Nissen (February 3, 1914 – April 7, 2010) was an American gymnast and inventor who developed the modern trampoline and made trampolining a worldwide sport and recreation.

== Background ==
Born on February 3, 1914, in Blairstown, Iowa, to Franklin C. Nissen and Catherine M. (Jensen) Nissen, George became a keen gymnast in high school and won three NCAA gymnastics championships while a student at the University of Iowa. Nissen went to high school at Washington High School in Cedar Rapids, Iowa. Nissen was also an initiated member of the Pi Kappa Alpha fraternity while he was in school. He had seen circus trapeze artists use their safety nets as an elastic bed to rebound and perform additional tricks. He thought that this would be useful training tool for his tumbling. In 1934, Nissen and his coach, Larry Griswold, built the prototype trampoline from angle iron with a canvas bed and rubber springs. Nissen used it to help with his training and to entertain children at a summer camp.

After he had graduated in Business Studies in 1937, Nissen and two friends toured the United States of America and Mexico performing at fairs and carnivals. While in Mexico, he heard the word trampolín, springboard in Spanish, and decided to use it for his bouncing apparatus. He trademarked the word in an anglicised form. He built a few trampolines and promoted the sale of his trampolines by touring performances, which did gradually increase sales. In 1941, he and Griswold set up the Griswold-Nissen Trampoline & Tumbling Company in Cedar Rapids, Iowa.

== Career ==
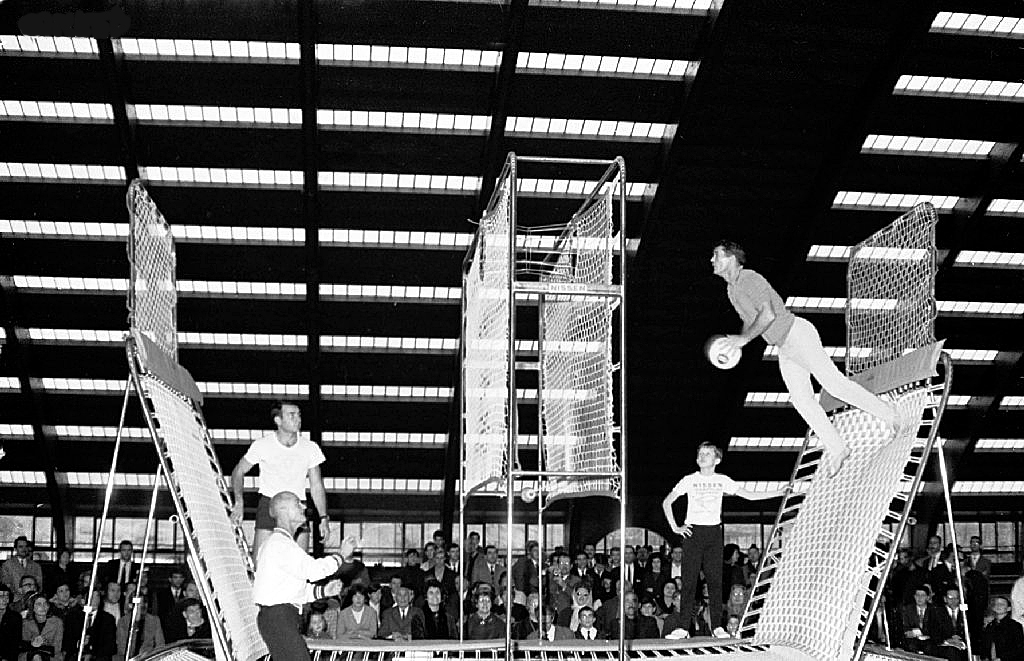
George Nissen and other players demonstrating Spaceball in Paris in 1965

During World War II, the trampoline was used to train pilots by getting them used to orienting themselves in the air. After the war Nissen continued to promote the trampoline and began touring in Europe and later the Soviet Union promoting both the sport of "rebound tumbling" and his trampoline equipment. Nissen set up a manufacturing plant for his company in England in 1956 headed up by Ted Blake an English trampoline pioneer, first in Hainault then Romford and finally Brentwood, Essex by the mid-1960s, and manufactured trampolines there for many years. Brentwood still has a thriving trampolining community but no longer a local factory. But by the late 1970s other manufacturers had started to make similar equipment and eventually, although the word trampoline was originally trademarked by Nissen, it became a generic trademark for rebound apparatus. Soon after, Nissen's company ceased operations in the 1980s.

Nissen continued to have an influence on gymnastics and trampolining. In 1971, with Larry Griswold, he founded the United States Tumbling & Trampoline Association (USTA). He has been honored by the sports of both trampolining and gymnastics. The USTA has the Griswold-Nissen Cup for an outstanding trampolinist. There is an international trampolining competition held in Switzerland called the Nissen Cup. In the United States, the Nissen-Emery Award is given to the best male senior gymnast in the college gymnastics system. He sponsored the 1st. World Trampoline Championship at the Albert Hall, London in March 1964, which was commemorated by a stamp featuring Judy Wills, who became the first woman's champion and defended that title a further 7 times. Spaceball, which he invented, was his pet love and he sponsored the Nissen trophy for the first UK National champion, won by Nick Proctor in 1963. At the championship the USA team narrowly beat the GB team 7–6, 6–7, 7–6 in a demonstration international. "The History of World Trampolining" by Rob Walker.

== Later years ==
Nissen remained involved in a trampoline manufacturing business making trampolines for exercise and for space ball, a game similar to volleyball but played on a trampoline surface.

Nissen had always wanted to have trampolining included in the Olympic Games. This finally happened in the 2000 Summer Olympics in Sydney. At 86 years old, Nissen attended with his daughter Dian Nissen, a title-winning trampoline athlete. Along with Dian and his grandson, he also attended the 2008 Summer Olympics, where he was given the honor of testing out the Olympic trampoline prior to competition.

He died in San Diego, California on April 7, 2010, at the age of 96 from complications from pneumonia.

== See also ==
- "George Nissen jumping on trampoline with kangaroo (photograph)". ABC News (Australian Broadcasting Corporation). 18 December 2018.
