= Sophia Carlotta Chiariello =

Swiss rhythmic gymnast (born 2008)

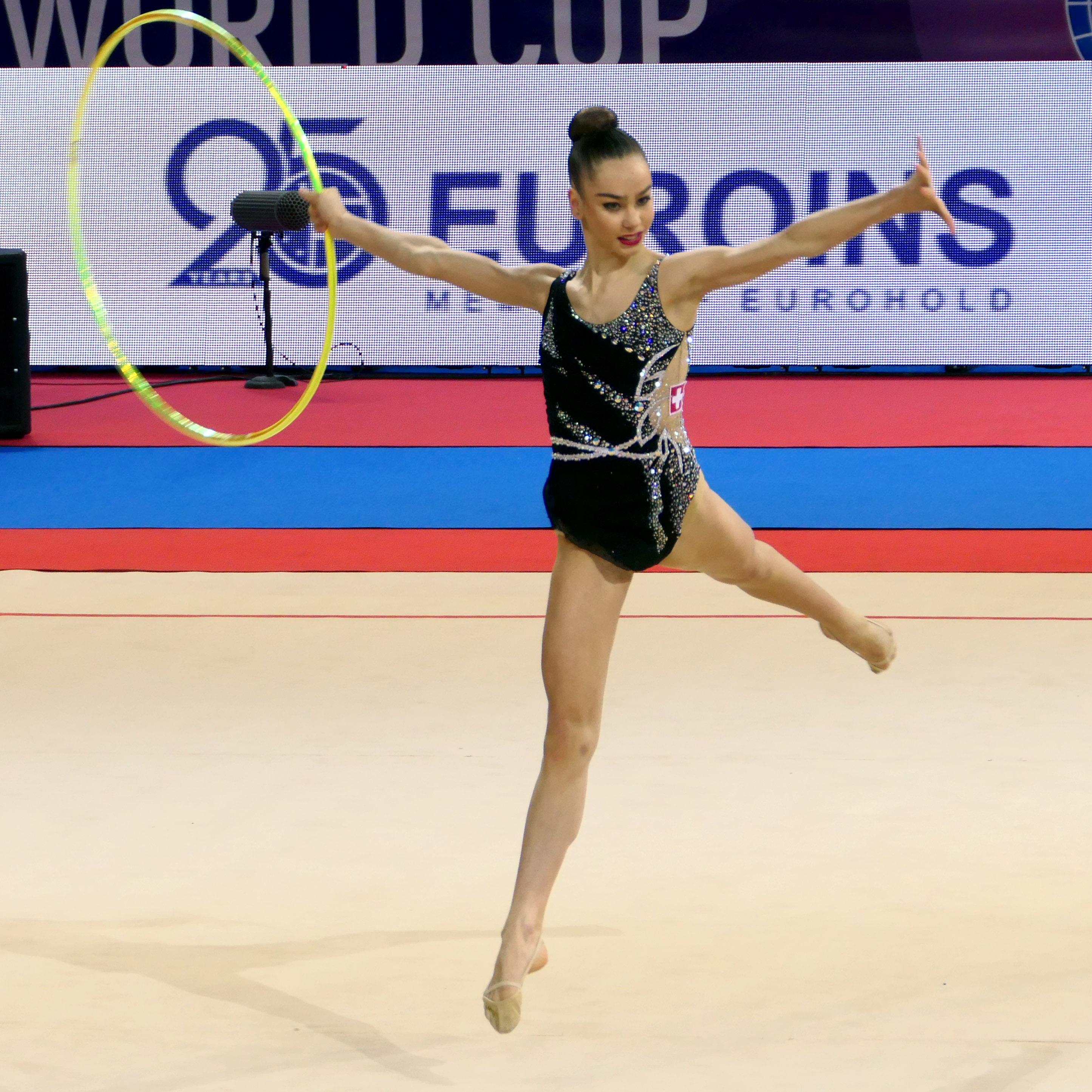
- Chiariello in 2024

Personal information
- Born: 17 July 2008 (age 17) Münchenbuchsee, Bern

Gymnastics career
- Sport: Rhythmic gymnastics
- Country represented: Switzerland

Sophia Carlotta Chiariello (born 17 July 2008) is a Swiss individual rhythmic gymnast. She is the first Swiss gymnast to win a gold all-around medal at an International Gymnastics Federation (FIG)-sanctioned event.

== Personal life ==
Chiariello was born 17 July, 2008. She has three siblings, two sisters and one brother. Her older sister Livia Maria is also an internationally competitive rhythmic gymnast. In her free time, she enjoys baking and watching films.

== Career ==
Chiariello began gymnastics at four years old.

In 2022, she competed at the Junior European Championships, where she placed 15th with the hoop.

In February 2023, she competed at the Gracia Cup in Budapest, where she won the silver medal in the all-around, a first for a Swiss rhythmic gymnast at an FIG-sanctioned event. She also won the gold medal in the ribbon final and silver with hoop and clubs. By June, she had already won more medals at FIG-sanctioned events than any other Swiss rhythmic gymnast, including the first all-around gold. In June, she won the all-around at the junior Swiss Gymnastics Championships as well as three of the four apparatus finals.

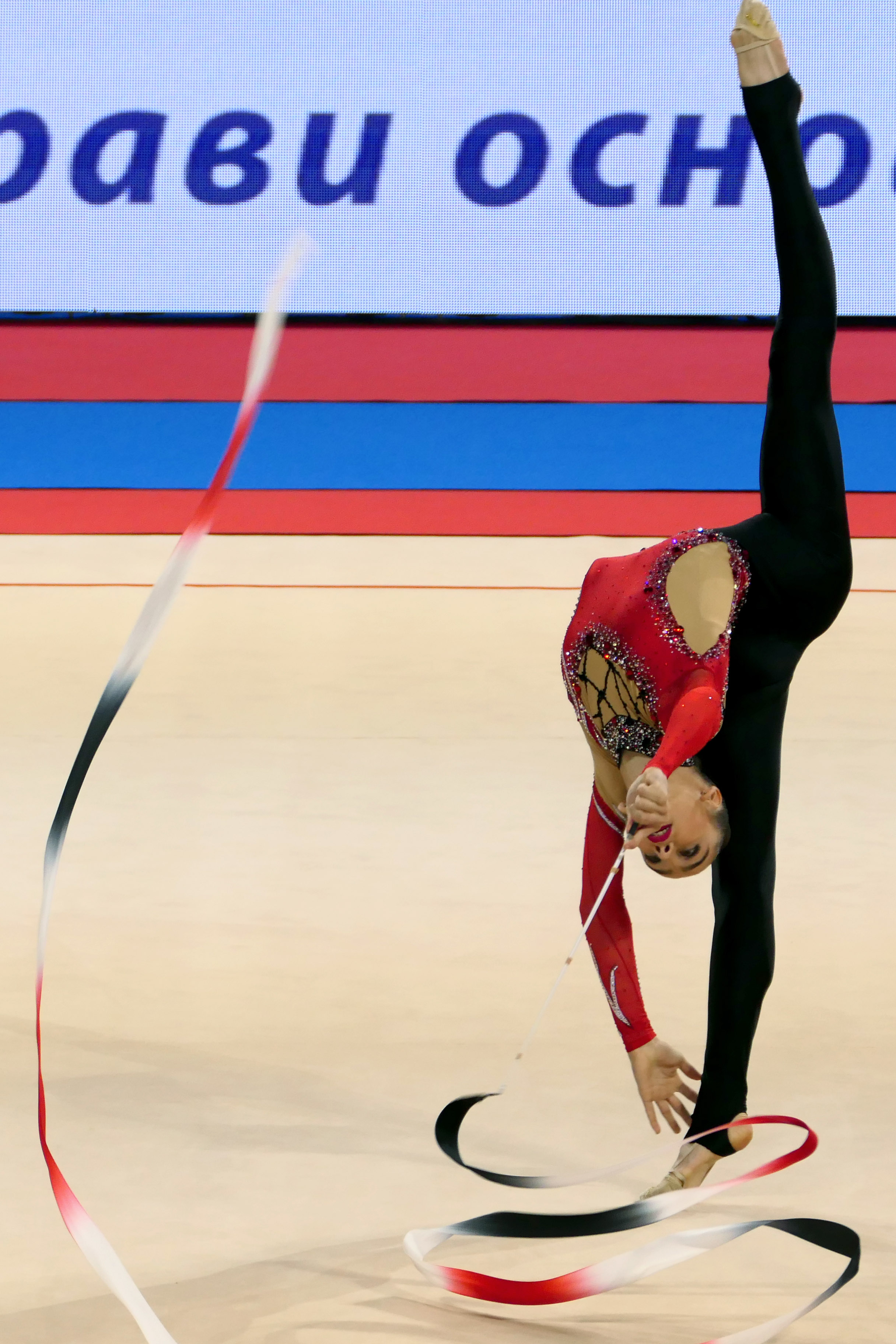
Chiariello performing a balance in a back split position at the 2024 Sofia World Cup

Despite her results, however, neither she nor any other Swiss gymnasts were sent to the Junior World Championships, although the Swiss Gymnastics Federation had provisionally registered athletes to compete, a decision that attracted attention and criticism. Chiariello only commented to say that she wanted to participate; Schweizer Radio und Fernsehen (SRF) noted that her silence on the matter was not unusual, as contracts for female gymnasts often contained clauses requiring them not to speak against the Federation. The Federation claimed that they had not planned to send gymnasts to the competition and that the majority of regional head coaches agreed with their decision. However, an investigation by SRF found that this was not the case, and they criticized the Federation for an ongoing lack of transparency after the fallout of the Magglingen Protocols.

Chiariello began to compete as a senior in 2024. She competed at the World Cup in Sofia in April along with Norah Demierre, where she placed 16th in the all-around. In May, she made her debut at the European Championships in Budapest, where she placed 35th in the all-around qualifications. A week later, she competed at the Swiss Rhythmic Gymnastics Championships and won the national senior title ahead of Lauren Grüniger and Nika Zajc. Chiariello said that while she was very happy to have won, she was even happier for the enthusiastic crowd, as she thought that it was important for rhythmic gymnastics to get attention and support in Switzerland.

In April 2025, she competed at the World Cup in Baku along with her sister. In the all-around, Chiariello ranked just behind her sister in 39th place. She was the first alternate for the European Championships, but she did not compete at the 2025 Swiss Rhythmic Gymnastics Championships held 31 May and 1 June. She returned to competition in September at the San Marino cup, where she placed 11th.
