= Livia Maria Chiariello =

Swiss rhythmic gymnast

- Full name: Livia Maria Chiariello
- Born: 2005 (age 20–21) Münchenbuchsee, Bern, Switzerland

Gymnastics career
- Discipline: Rhythmic gymnastics
- Country represented: Switzerland (2021–present)
- Club: RG/GYM Länggasse Bern
- Head coach: Aneliya Stancheva

Livia Maria Chiariello (born 2005) is a Swiss individual rhythmic gymnast. She is a multiple-time junior national champion as well as the 2022 senior national champion, and she is also the first Swiss gymnast to win a medal at an International Gymnastics Federation-sanctioned event.

== Personal life ==
Chiariello has three siblings, two sisters and one brother. Her younger sister Sophia Carlotta is also an internationally competitive rhythmic gymnast. She likes to draw in her free time.

== Career ==
=== Early career ===
Chiariello took her first rhythmic gymnastics lesson when she was four. A teacher recommended that she take up a sport or art, and her mother, who had formerly taught ballet to rhythmic gymnasts, showed her videos of the sport, which she liked. Although Chiariello initially lost interest, she returned to lessons a year later. From 2017 to 2022, she won every Swiss competition she entered, including fourteen national titles in the all-around and event finals. Chiariello and her sister Sophia Carlotta traveled to Italy on several occasions to train under coaches there.

=== 2021 season ===
In 2021, Chiariello won the first two of three selection competitions that would decide which Swiss gymnast would be assigned to compete at the 2021 European Championships. However, she had to withdraw from the third due to acute stomach issues, and she was not selected to represent Switzerland at the European Championships. She also missed participating in a qualification competition for the Swiss National Championships in June due to an injury and so was not able to compete at the national championships. Although she wished to be able to take part in the 2021 World Championships, the Swiss Gymnastics Federation elected not to send any athletes. Chiariello said that she heard about the decision from Italian gymnasts who asked her why there would be no Swiss athletes at the competition.

In September, the national rhythmic gymnastics training center in Switzerland was dissolved, and athletes such as Chiariello had to train at regional centers. This was due to the fallout of the Magglingen Protocols, which was the result of an investigation following accusations of physical and psychological abuse by national team coaches in 2020; the report found that many of the gymnasts were verbally abused, and some also suffered physical violence. However, unlike the national training center, the regional centers did not have sprung floors, and Chiariello and other athletes continued their training on hard floors. The Swiss Gymnastics Federation was alerted to the risks of having gymnasts training without sprung floors in 2018 and again in April 2021 but did not take action. Chiariello began to spend some of her time training at home in the bedroom she shared with her sister; she also trained in a regional training hall that had ceilings too low for the high throws required in rhythmic gymnastics.

In October, Chiariello competed at the Aura Cup in Zagreb, where she won the silver medal in ball behind Ketevan Arbolishvili. This was the first medal won by a Swiss gymnast at an international tournament sanctioned by the International Gymnastics Federation.

=== 2022 season ===
Chiariello competed at her first European Championships in June. She performed all four routines without dropping her apparatus, but she did not reach the all-around final. She placed 36th, the best result for an individual Swiss gymnast in over 20 years. Although she suffered from pain due to a stress fracture in her foot - estimated by a physician to be her third or fourth - she continued to train. The fracture was caused by training on hard floors rather than sprung ones.

She was selected to compete at the World Championships in Sofia, Bulgaria, in October. It was the first time a Swiss individual rhythmic gymnast would be competing at the World Championships since 1991. Chiariello said that she was pleased to able to compete there, though she also noted that most of her competitors there had more favorable training circumstances. She estimated that they generally trained about fifteen hours per week more than her and in turn spent less time at school, and she mentioned the continuing issue with the lack of training halls with high ceilings and sprung floors as a problem that was both causing health issues for Swiss gymnasts and holding them back technically compared to their competitors in other countries. At the Championships, she performed cleanly with hoop and ball but dropped her apparatus in her clubs exercise. She did not qualify for the all-around final, but she said that she was satisfied with her performance.

=== 2023 season ===
Chiariello did not compete in 2023 due to her foot injury.

=== 2024 season ===
In April 2024, she returned to competition by entering the Unity Cup in Poland. There, she won the gold medal in the all-around. In early June, she competed at the Swiss National Championships and placed fifth in the all-around. Later in June, she competed at the Grand Prix stage in Brno, where she finished in 18th place in the all-around.

Chiariello was elected to a new athletes' commission for the Swiss Gymnastics Federation in December as the representative for rhythmic gymnastics.

=== 2025 season ===
In March, Chiariello competed at the Aphrodite Cup in Athens. Despite dropping her apparatus in three of her four routines, she placed the best of the Swiss gymnasts in the all-around and finished in 21st. Chiariello said, "The last few months have been a challenge, but this result shows that the hard work has paid off." The event was one of two used to select the competitors for the 2025 European Championships. The second selection event was the MTM Tournament in Ljubljana, held in April. Chiariello scored less than half a point less than her sister, Sophia Carlotta, though she did not compete for a ranking. It was announced afterward that Chiariello, along with Lauren Grüniger, had been selected to compete at the European Championships.

Later in April, she competed at the World Cup in Baku along with her sister. In the all-around, Chiariello ranked just ahead of her sister in 38th place.

At the European Championships in June, she ranked 39th in the all-around qualifications.
