= List of acrobatic activities =

This is a list of circus skills, dances, performance arts, sports, and other activities that involve acrobatics.

== Dance ==
- Belly dance
- Ceremonial dance
- Disco / Soul dance
- Free and improvised dance
- Historical dance
- Latin dance / Rhythm
- Novelty and fad dances
- Social dance
- Street dance / Electronic dance
- Swing dance
- Other

== Other ==
- Acrobatics –
  - Acrobalance – Floor-based acrobatic art involving hand balancing.
    - Adagio – Performance of partner acrobalance poses and associated movements that involve stationary balances by a pair of performers.
  - Acro dance – Combines classical dance technique with precision acrobatic elements.
  - Acroyoga – Physical practice which combines yoga and acrobatics.
- Aerial hoop – Circular steel apparatus (resembling a hula hoop) suspended from the ceiling, on which circus artists may perform aerial acrobatics.
- Aerial silk – Performance in which one or more artists perform aerial acrobatics while hanging from a fabric.
- Aerobatics – Practice of flying maneuvers involving aircraft attitudes that are not used in normal flight.
- Artistic cycling – Competitive indoor cycling in which athletes perform tricks (called exercises) for points on specialized, fixed-gear bikes in a format similar to ballet or gymnastics.
- Bossaball – Ball game between two teams, combining elements of volleyball, football and gymnastics with music into a sport.
- Cheerleading - is an activity in which the participants (called cheerleaders) cheer for their team as a form of encouragement.
- Contortion – Performance art in which performers called contortionists showcase their skills of extreme physical flexibility.
- Corde lisse – Aerial circus skill or act that involves acrobatics on a vertically hanging rope.
- Cyr wheel – Acrobatic apparatus that consists of a single large ring made of aluminum or steel with a diameter approximately 10 to 15 cm (4 to 6 in) taller than the performer.
- Diving – Sport of jumping or falling into water from a platform or springboard, usually while performing acrobatics.
- Globe of death – Circus and carnival stunt where stunt riders ride motorcycles inside a mesh sphere ball.
- Figure skating – Sport in which individuals, pairs, or groups perform on figure skates on ice.
- Fitkid - a type of children's sport combining gymnastics, dance and acrobatics.
- Freerunning – Way of expression by interacting with various obstacles and environment. May include flipping and spinning.
- Freestyle BMX – Bicycle motocross stunt riding on BMX bikes.
- Freestyle motocross – Variation on the sport of motocross in which motorcycle riders attempt to impress judges with jumps and stunts.
- Freestyle scootering – Extreme sport that involves using stunt scooters to perform freestyle tricks that are similar to bicycle motocross (BMX) and skateboarding.
- Freestyle skiing – Skiing discipline comprising aerials, moguls, cross, half-pipe, slopestyle and big air as part of the Winter Olympics.
- Freestyle skydiving – Competitive skydiving discipline where one member of a two-person team performs acrobatic manoeuvres in free fall while the other one films the performance from a close distance using a helmet-mounted camera.
- Gymnastics – Sport that includes physical exercises requiring balance, strength, flexibility, agility, coordination, and endurance.
- Hooping – Manipulation of and artistic movement or dancing with a hoop (or hoops).
- Juggling – Physical skill, performed by a juggler, involving the manipulation of objects for recreation, entertainment, art or sport.
- Jump rope – Tool used in the sport of skipping/jump rope where one or more participants jump over a rope swung so that it passes under their feet and over their heads.
- Kiteboarding – Extreme sport where the kiteboarder harnesses the power of the wind with a large controllable power kite to be propelled across the water, land, or snow.
- Parkour – Training discipline using movement that developed from military obstacle course training. Includes running, climbing, swinging, vaulting, jumping, plyometrics, rolling, quadrupedal movement (crawling).
- Pole climbing – Ascending a pole which one can grip with his or her hands.
- Pole dancing – A performance that combines dance and acrobatics centered on a vertical pole.
- Russian bar – Circus act which combines the gymnastic skills of the balance beam, the rebound tempo skills of trampoline, and the swing handstand skills of the uneven bars and the parallel bars.
- Salto del pastor (shepherd's leap) – Folk sport practised throughout the Canary Islands.
- Skateboarding – Action sport that involves riding and performing tricks using a skateboard, as well as a recreational activity, an art form, an entertainment industry job, and a method of transportation.
- Slacklining – Act of walking, running or balancing along a suspended length of flat webbing that is tensioned between two anchors.
- Snowboarding – Recreational and competitive activity that involves descending a snow-covered slope while standing on a snowboard that is almost always attached to a rider's feet.
- Spanish web – Aerial circus skill in which a performer climbs and performs various tricks on an apparatus resembling a vertically hanging rope.
- Surfing – Surface water sport in which an individual, a surfer, uses a board to ride on the forward section, or face, of a moving wave of water, which usually carries the surfer towards the shore.
- Synchronized swimming – Hybrid form of swimming, dance, and gymnastics, consisting of swimmers performing a synchronised routine of elaborate moves in the water, accompanied by music.
- Teeterboard – Acrobatic apparatus that resembles a playground seesaw. The well-trained flyer performs various aerial somersaults, landing on padded mats, a human pyramid, a specialized landing chair, stilts, or even a Russian bar.
- Tightrope – Skill of walking along a thin wire or rope. It has a long tradition in various countries and is commonly associated with the circus.
- Trampolining – Recreational activity, acrobatic training tool as well as a competitive Olympic sport in which athletes perform acrobatics while bouncing on a trampoline.
  - Wall running – Sport where the participant uses a wall and platforms placed next to the trampoline bed to do tricks.
- Trapeze – Short horizontal bar hung by ropes or metal straps from a support. It is an aerial apparatus commonly found in circus performances.
- Tricking – Training discipline that combines kicks with flips and twists from martial arts and gymnastics as well as many dance moves and styles from breakdancing.
- Tumbling – Gymnastics discipline in which participants perform a series of acrobatic skills down a 25 metres (82 ft) long sprung track.
- Water skiing – Surface water sport in which an individual is pulled behind a boat or a cable ski installation over a body of water, skimming the surface on two skis or one ski.
- Wheel of death – Large rotating apparatus on which performers carry out synchronized acrobatic skills.
