= Gymnastics =

Sport requiring strength and flexibility

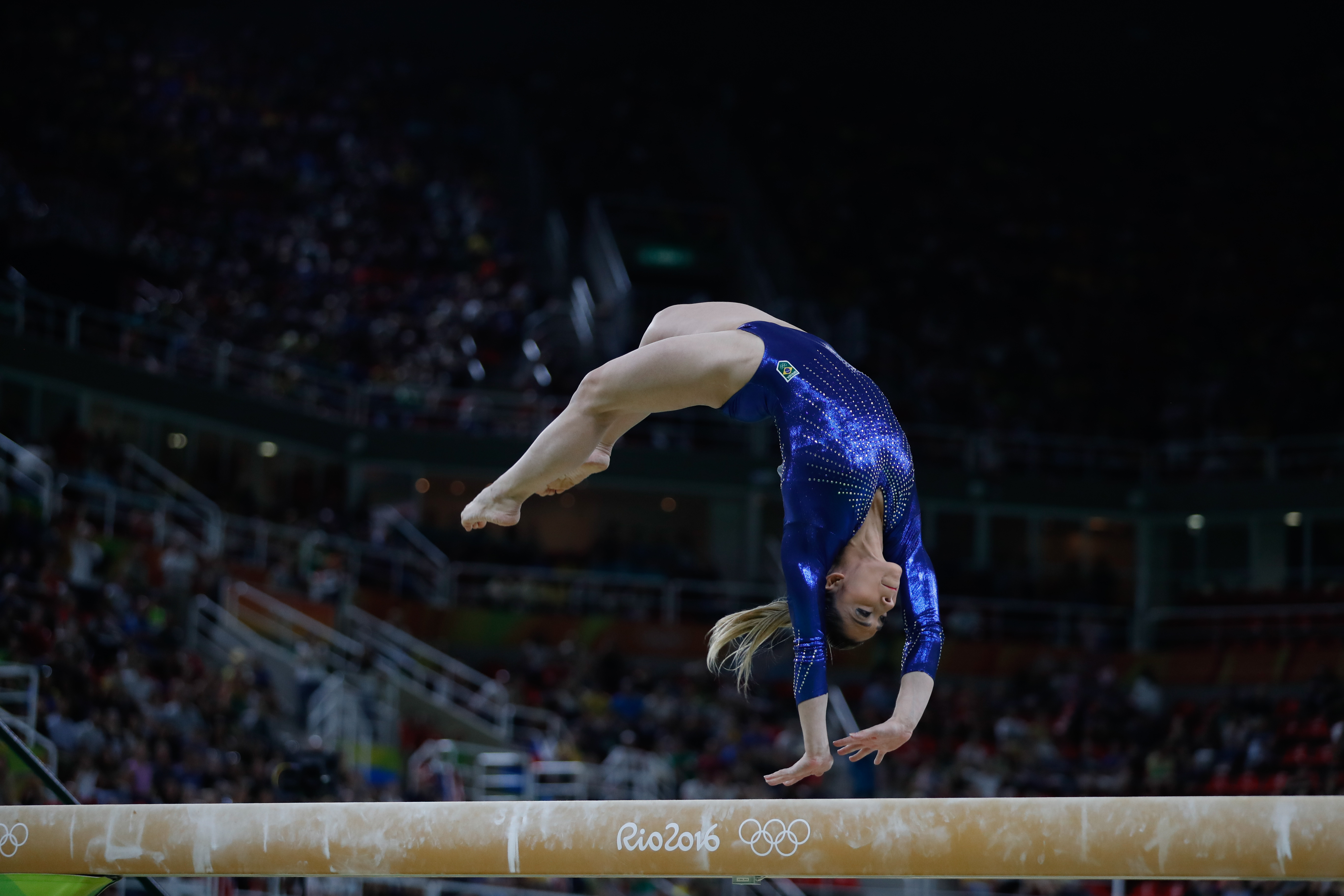
- Daniele Hypólito performing on the balance beam
- Highest governing body: World Gymnastics
- First played: Began in ancient Greece (Sparta and Athens)

Characteristics
- Contact: Yes
- Mixed-sex: Yes
- Type: Indoor
- Equipment: Varies by discipline
- Venue: Gymnasium

Presence
- Country or region: Worldwide
- Olympic: Yes, Summer Olympics

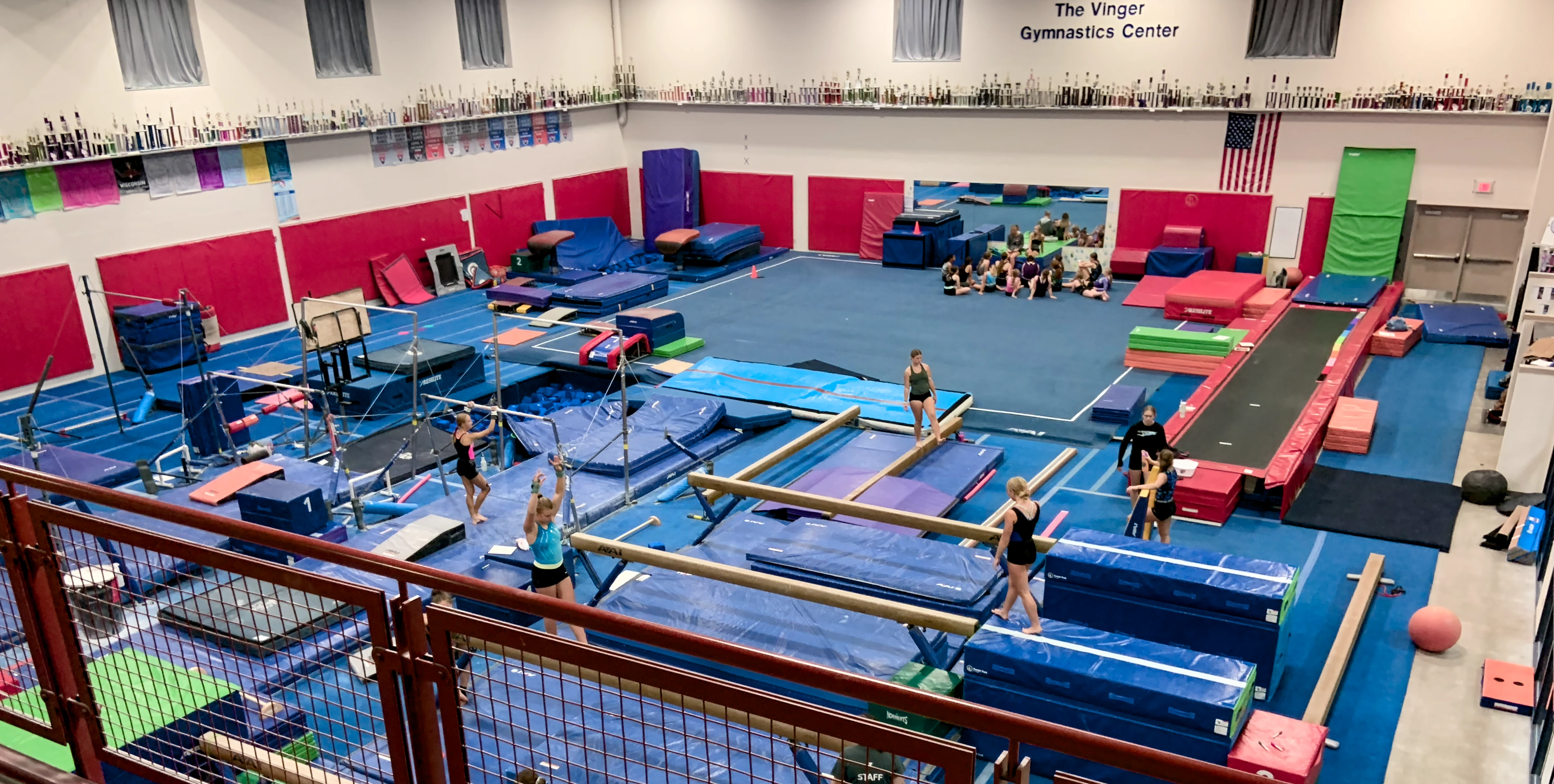
Gymnastics practice facility at a YMCA

Gymnastics is a group of sports that includes physical exercises requiring balance, strength, flexibility, agility, coordination, artistry and endurance. The movements involved in gymnastics contribute to the development of the arms, legs, shoulders, back, chest, and abdominal muscle groups. Gymnastics evolved from exercises used by the ancient Greeks that included skills for mounting and dismounting a horse.

The most common form of competitive gymnastics is artistic gymnastics; for women, the events include floor, vault, uneven bars, and balance beam; for men, besides floor and vault, it includes rings, pommel horse, parallel bars, and horizontal bar.

The governing body for competition in gymnastics throughout the world is World Gymnastics, formerly known as the International Gymnastics Federation or FIG (from the French Fédération Internationale de Gymnastique). Eight sports are governed by the FIG, including gymnastics for all, men's and women's artistic gymnastics, rhythmic gymnastics (women's branch only), trampolining (including double mini-trampoline), tumbling, acrobatic, aerobic, parkour and para-gymnastics. Disciplines not currently recognized by FIG include wheel gymnastics, aesthetic group gymnastics, TeamGym, men's rhythmic gymnastics (both the Spanish form which is identical to the women's version and the Japanese version which is a different sport) and mallakhamba.

Participants in gymnastics-related sports include young children, recreational-level athletes, and competitive athletes at all skill levels.

== Etymology ==
The word gymnastics derives from the common Greek adjective γυμνός (gymnos), by way of the related verb γυμνάζω (gymnazo), whose meaning is to "train naked", "train in gymnastic exercise", generally "to train, to exercise". The verb had this meaning because athletes in ancient times exercised and competed without clothing.

== History ==
Gymnastics can be traced to exercises performed in Ancient Greece, specifically in Sparta and Athens. Exercise of that time was documented by Philostratus' work Gymnastics: The Ethics of an Athletic Aesthetic. The original term for the practice of gymnastics is from the related Greek verb γυμνάζω (gumnázō), which translates as "to train naked or nude," because young men exercised without clothing. In ancient Greece, physical fitness was highly valued among both men and women. It was not until after the Romans conquered Greece in 146 BC that gymnastics became more formalized and was used to train men in warfare. On Philostratus' claim that gymnastics is a form of wisdom, comparable to philosophy, poetry, music, geometry, and astronomy, the people of Athens combined this more physical training with the education of the mind. At the Palestra, a physical education training center, the disciplines of educating the body and the mind were combined, allowing for a form of gymnastics that was more aesthetic and individual and that left behind the focus on strictness, discipline, the emphasis on defeating records, and a focus on strength.

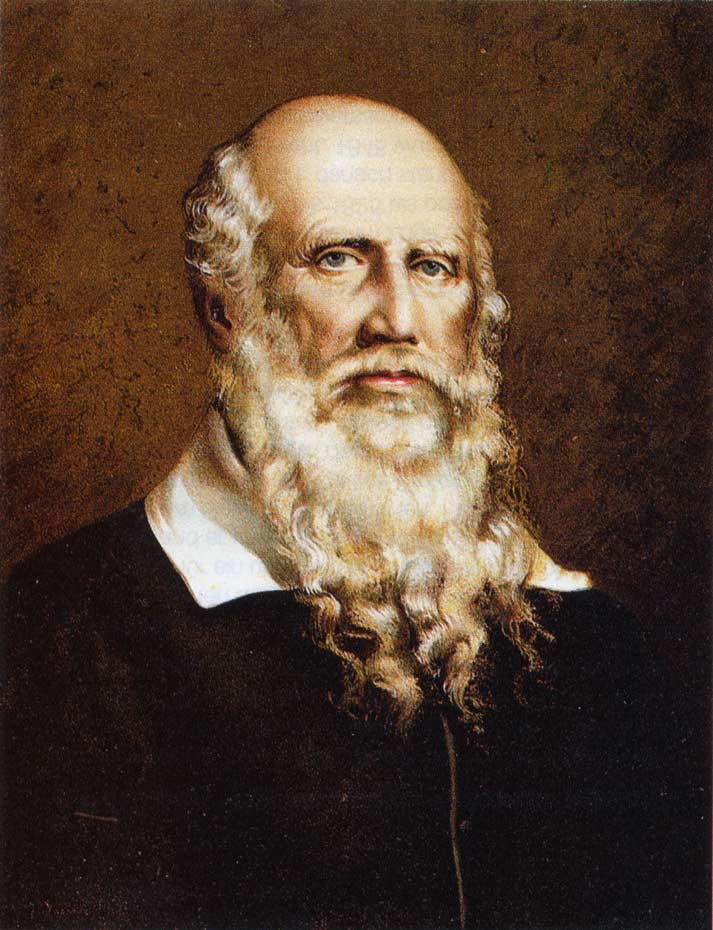
Friedrich Ludwig Jahn, the "father of gymnastics"

Don Francisco Amorós y Ondeano—a Spanish colonel born on 19 February 1770, in Valencia, who died on 8 August 1848, in Paris—was the first person to introduce educative gymnastics in France. The German Friedrich Ludwig Jahn began the German gymnastics movement in 1811 in Berlin, which led to the invention of the parallel bars, rings, the horizontal bar, the pommel horse and the vault horse.

Germans Charles Beck and Charles Follen and American John Neal brought the first wave of gymnastics to the United States in the 1820s. Beck opened the first gymnasium in the US in 1825 at the Round Hill School in Northampton, Massachusetts. Follen opened the first college gymnasium and the first public gymnasium in the US in 1826 at Harvard University and in Boston, Massachusetts, respectively. Neal was the first American to open a public gymnasium in the US, in Portland, Maine, in 1827. He also documented and promoted these early efforts in the American Journal of Education and The Yankee, helping to establish the American branch of the movement.

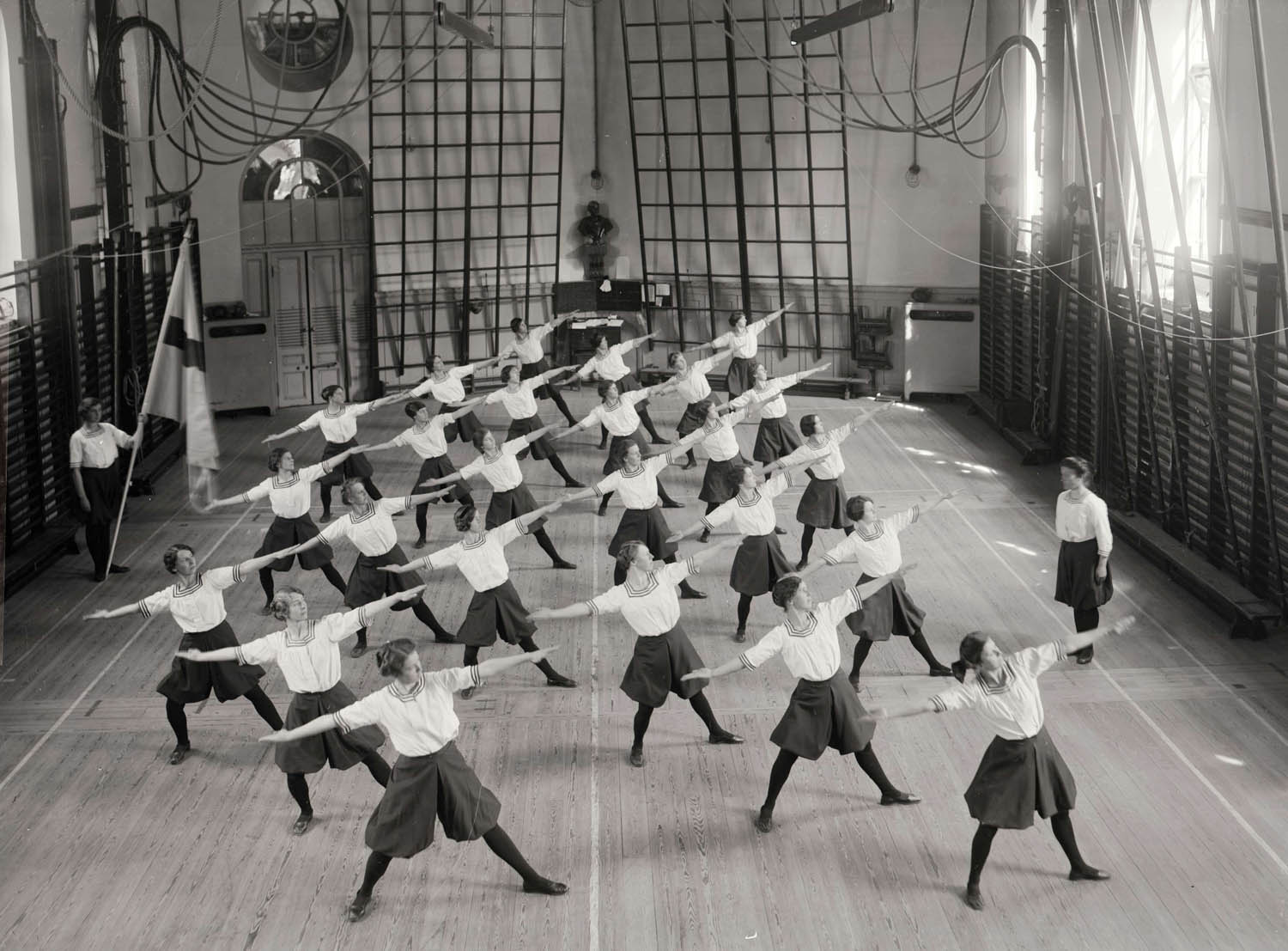
Early 20th-century gymnastics in Stockholm, Sweden

The Federation of International Gymnastics (FIG) was founded in Liege in 1881. By the end of the nineteenth century, men's gymnastics competition was popular enough to be included in the first modern Olympic Games, in 1896. From then until the early 1950s, both national and international competitions involved a changing variety of exercises gathered under the rubric, gymnastics, which included, for example, synchronized team floor calisthenics, rope climbing, high jumping, running, and horizontal ladder. During the 1920s, women organized and participated in gymnastics events. Elin Falk revolutionized how gymnastics was taught in Swedish schools between 1910 and 1932. The first women's Olympic competition was limited, involving only synchronized calisthenics and track and field. These games were held in 1928 in Amsterdam.

By 1954, Olympic Games apparatus and events for men and women had been standardized in a modern format, and uniform grading structures (including a point system from 1 to 15) had been agreed upon. In 1930, the first UK mass movement organization of women in gymnastics, the Women's League of Health and Beauty, was founded by Mary Bagot Stack in London. At this time, Soviet gymnasts astounded the world with highly disciplined and difficult performances, setting a precedent that continues. Television has helped publicize and initiate a modern age of gymnastics. Both men's and women's gymnastics now attract considerable international interest, and excellent gymnasts can be found on every continent.

In 2006, a new points system for Artistic gymnastics was put into play. An A Score (or D score) is the difficulty score, which as of 2009 derives from the eight highest-scoring elements in a routine (excluding Vault), in addition to the points awarded for composition requirements; each vault has a difficulty score assigned by the FIG. The B Score (or E Score), is the score for execution and is given for how well the skills are performed.

== FIG-recognized disciplines ==
The following disciplines are governed by FIG.

=== Artistic gymnastics ===
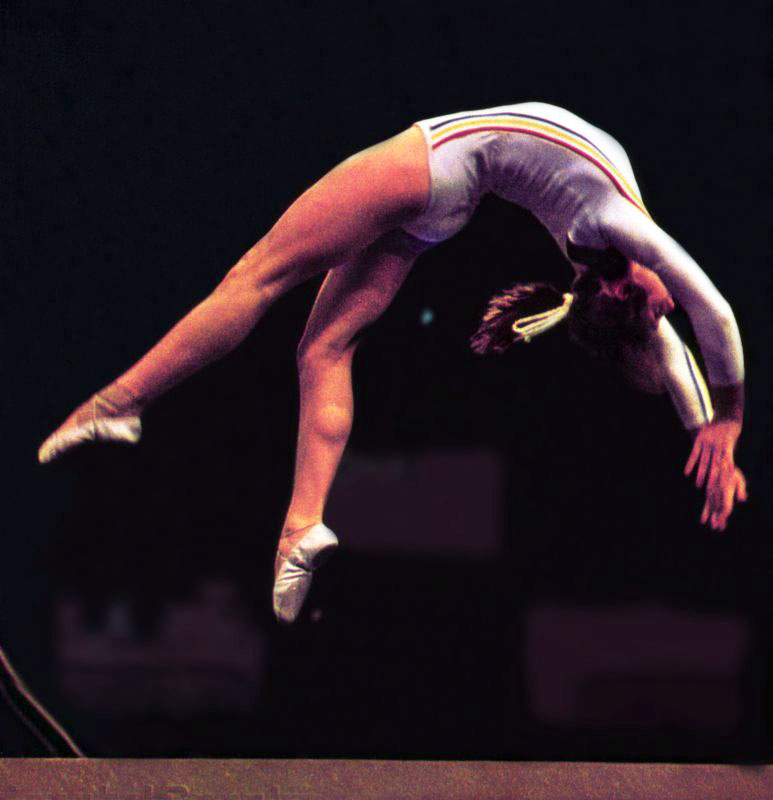
Nadia Comăneci in 1976. The artistry and grace of Comăneci and Soviet gymnast Olga Korbut gave the sport global popularity.

Artistic gymnastics is usually divided into men's and women's gymnastics. Men compete on six events: floor exercise, pommel horse, still rings, vault, parallel bars, and horizontal bar, while women compete on four: vault, uneven bars, balance beam, and floor exercise. In some countries, women at one time competed on the rings, horizontal bar, and parallel bars (for example, in the 1950s in the USSR). Women initially competed in team events; the 1952 Summer Olympics was the first to have individual finals and apparatus finals for women.

In 2006, FIG introduced a new point system for artistic gymnastics. Unlike the old code of points, in which there was a maximum 10.0 score, there are two separate scores that are added to produce the final score. The first is the execution score, which starts at 10 and has deductions taken for execution mistakes, and the second is the difficulty score, which is open-ended and based on what elements the gymnasts perform. It may be lower than the intended difficulty score if the gymnast does not perform or complete all the skills, or they do not connect a skill meant to be connected to another. Scoring for national developmental levels or outside of the FIG competition system may continue to use the 10.0 system; for example, US women's collegiate gymnastics still uses the 10.0 system.

==== Competitive events for women in artistic gymnastics ====
Piked Tsukahara vault

===== Vault =====
In the vaulting events, gymnasts sprint down a 25 metres (82 ft) runway, to take off onto a spring board performing a roundoff handspring or front handspring entry onto a vault board). They then land momentarily inverted on the hands-on the vaulting horse or vaulting table (pre-flight segment) and propel themselves forward or backward off that platform to a two-footed landing (post-flight segment). The post-flight segment may include one or more saltos, or twisting movements. A round-off entry vault, called a Yurchenko, is a commonly performed vault in the higher levels of women's gymnastics. Other vaults include taking off from the vault board with both feet at the same time and either doing a front handspring or round-off onto the vaulting table.

In 2001, the traditional vaulting horse was replaced with a new apparatus, sometimes known as a tongue, horse, or vaulting table. The new apparatus is more stable, wider, and longer than the older vaulting horse, approximately 1 metre (3.3 ft) in length and 1 metre (3.3 ft) in width, giving gymnasts a larger blocking surface. This apparatus is thus considered safer than the vaulting horse used in the past. With the addition of this new, safer vaulting table, gymnasts are attempting more difficult vaults.

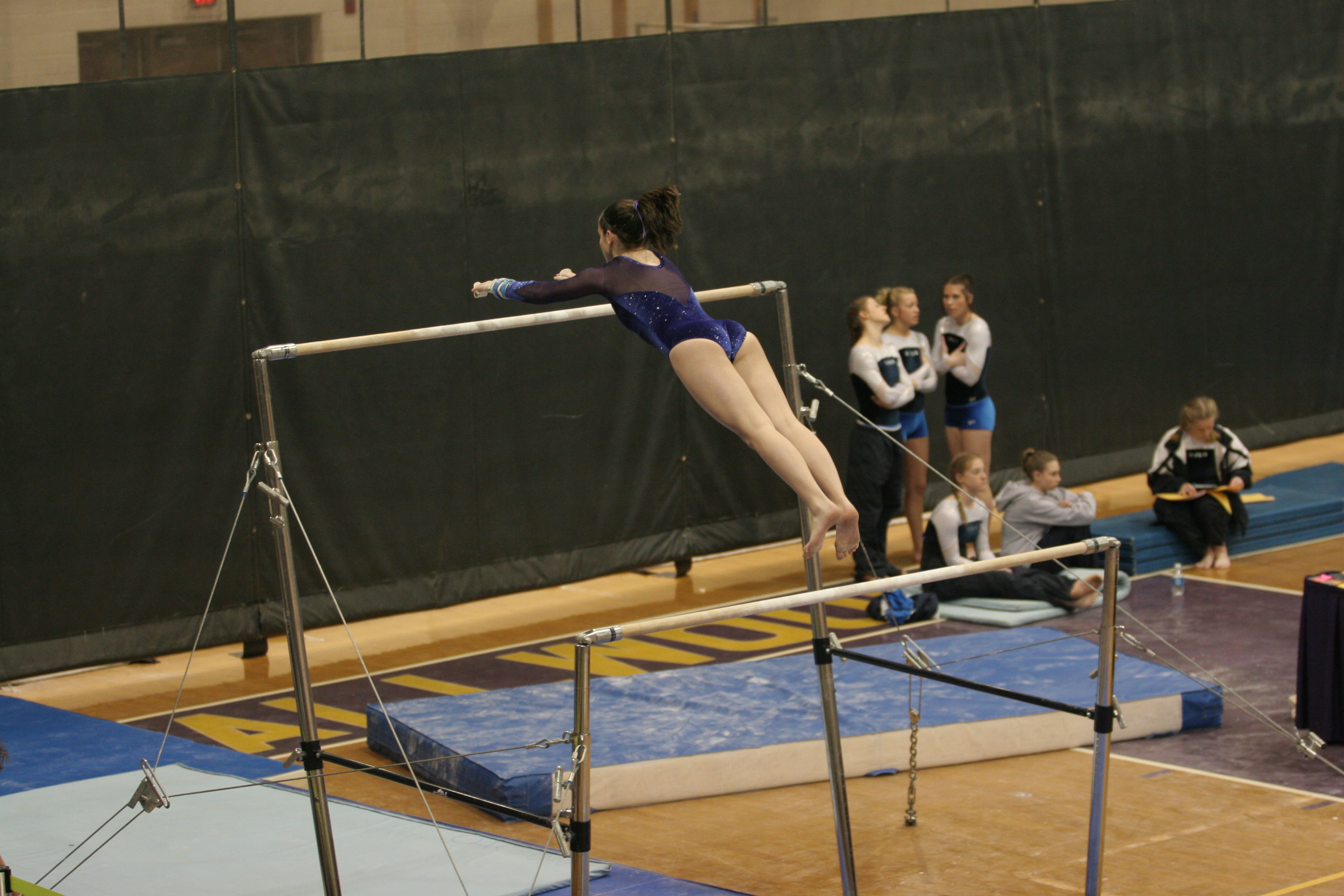
Gymnast on uneven bars

===== Uneven bars =====
On the uneven bars, gymnasts perform a timed routine on two parallel horizontal bars set at different heights. These bars are made of fiberglass covered in wood laminate to prevent them from breaking. In the past, bars were made of wood, but the bars were prone to breaking, providing an incentive to switch to newer technologies. The height of the bars may be adjusted by 5 centimetres (2.0 in) to the size needed by individual gymnasts, although the distance between bars cannot be changed for individual gymnasts in elite competition.

In the past, the uneven parallel bars were closer together. The bars have been moved increasingly further apart, allowing gymnasts to perform swinging, circling, transitional, and release moves that may pass over, under, and between the two bars. At the elite level, movements must pass through the handstand. Gymnasts often mount the uneven bars using a springboard or a small mat, and they may use chalk (MgCO_{3}) and grips (a leather strip with holes for fingers to protect hands and improve performance) when performing this event. The chalk helps take the moisture out of gymnasts' hands to decrease friction and prevent rips (tears to the skin of the hands); dowel grips help gymnasts grip the bar.

===== Balance beam =====
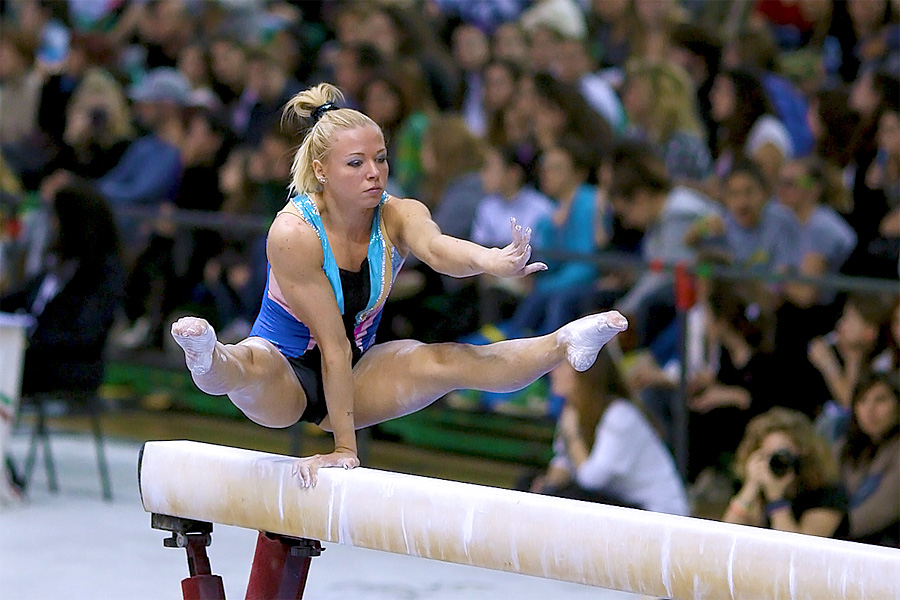
Dorina Böczögő performing a one-arm press hold during her balance beam mount, 2013

The gymnast performs a choreographed routine of up to 90 seconds in length consisting of leaps, acrobatic skills, somersaults, turns, and dance elements on a padded beam. The beam is 125 centimetres (4 ft 1 in) above the ground, 5 metres (16 ft 5 in) long, and 10.16 centimetres (4.00 in) wide. It can also be adjusted, to be raised higher or lower.

===== Floor =====
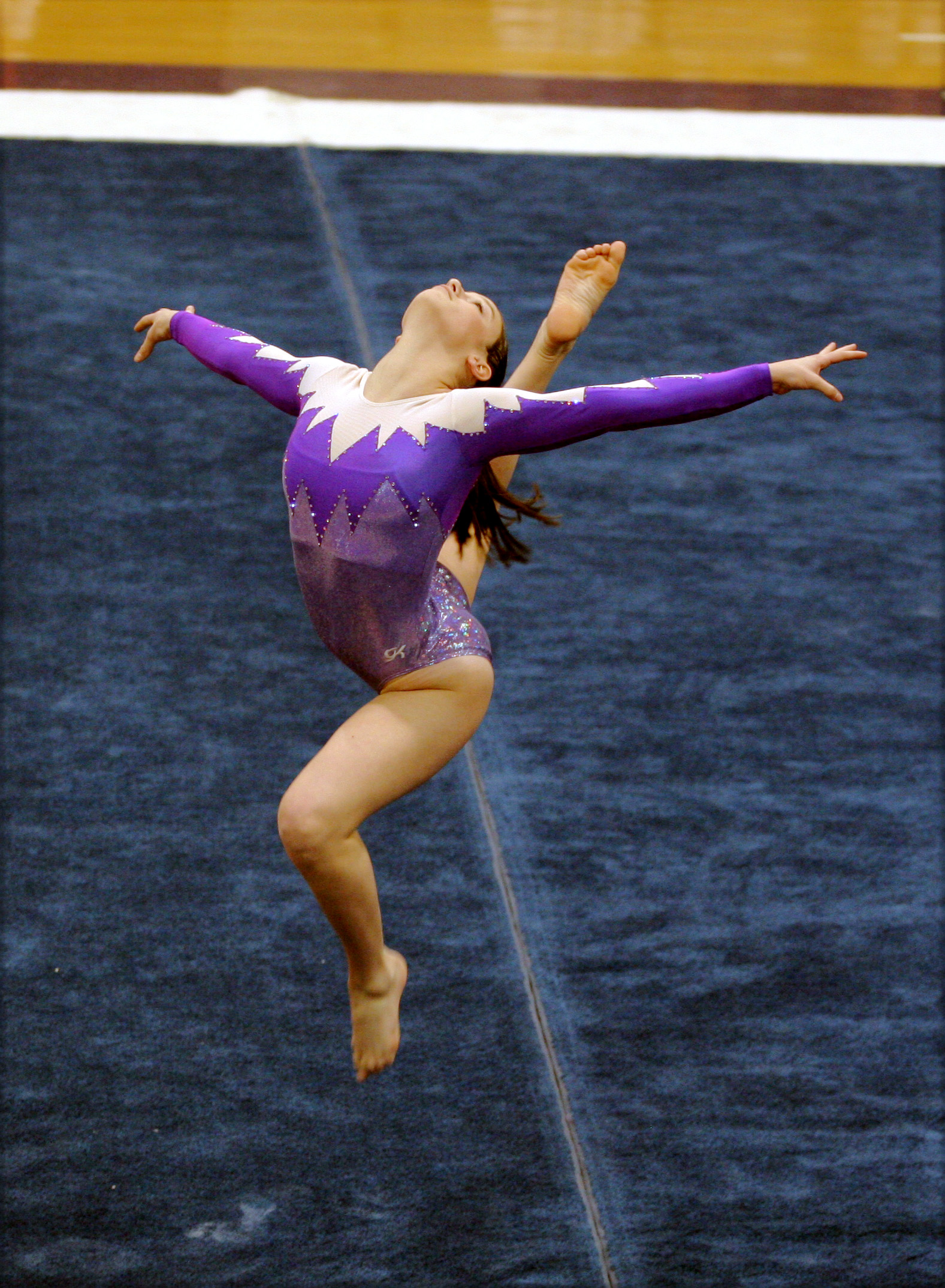
Gymnast doing a stag leap on floor exercise

The event in gymnastics performed on the floor is called floor exercise. In the past, the floor exercise event was executed on the bare floor or mats such as wrestling mats. The floor event now occurs on a carpeted 12 metres (39 ft) x 12 metres (39 ft) square, usually consisting of hard foam over a layer of plywood, which is supported by springs generally called a spring floor. This provides a firm surface that provides extra bounce or spring when compressed, allowing gymnasts to achieve greater height and a softer landing after the composed skill. Gymnasts perform a choreographed routine to music (without words) for up to 90 seconds. The routine should consist of tumbling passes, series of jumps, leaps, dance elements, acrobatic skills, and turns, or pivots, on one foot. A gymnast can perform up to four tumbling passes, each of which usually includes at least one flight element without hand support.

==== Competitive events for men in artistic gymnastics ====
===== Floor =====
Male gymnasts also perform on a 12 metres (39 ft) x 12 metres (39 ft) spring floor. A series of tumbling passes are performed to demonstrate flexibility, strength, and balance. Strength skills include circles, scales, and press handstands. Men's floor routines usually have multiple passes that have to total between 60 and 70 seconds and are performed without music, unlike the women's event. Rules require that male gymnasts touch each corner of the floor at least once during their routine.

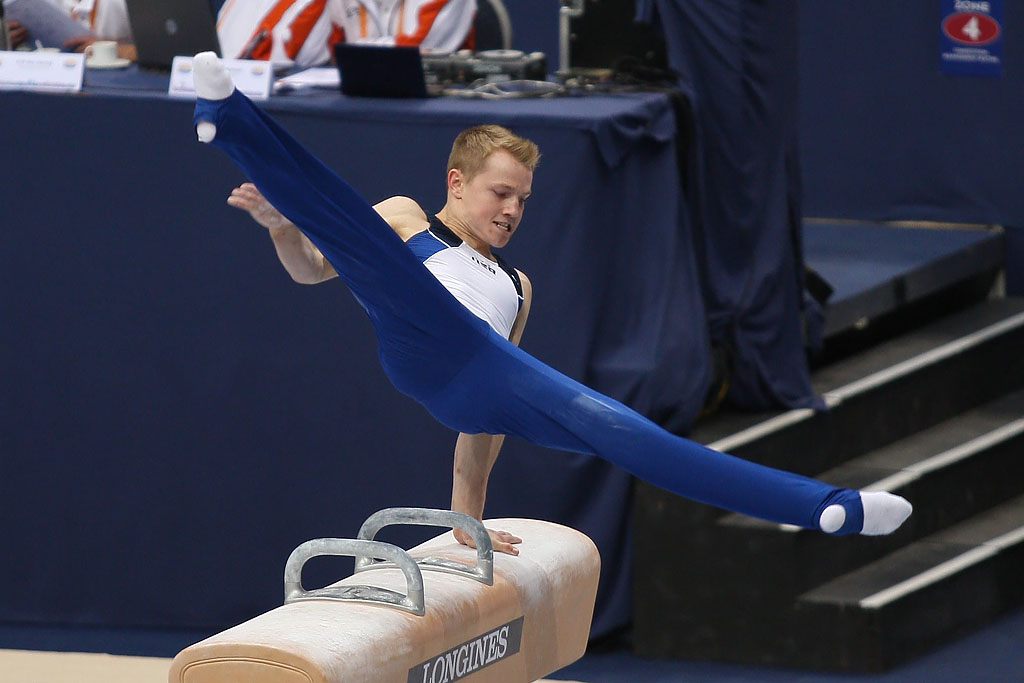
Chris Cameron on the pommel horse

===== Pommel horse =====
The pommel horse consists of a horizontal body with two pommels, or handles. Gymnasts perform by using their hands to support themselves on the horse. A typical pommel horse exercise involves both single-leg and double-leg work. Single-leg skills are generally found in the form of scissors, an element often done on the pommels. Double leg work, however, is the main staple of this event. The gymnast swings both legs in a circular motion (clockwise or counterclockwise depending on preference) and performs such skills on all parts of the apparatus. To make the exercise more challenging, gymnasts often include variations on a typical circling skill by turning (moores and spindles) or by straddling their legs (flares). Routines end when the gymnast performs a dismount, either by swinging his body over the horse or landing after a handstand variation.

===== Still rings =====
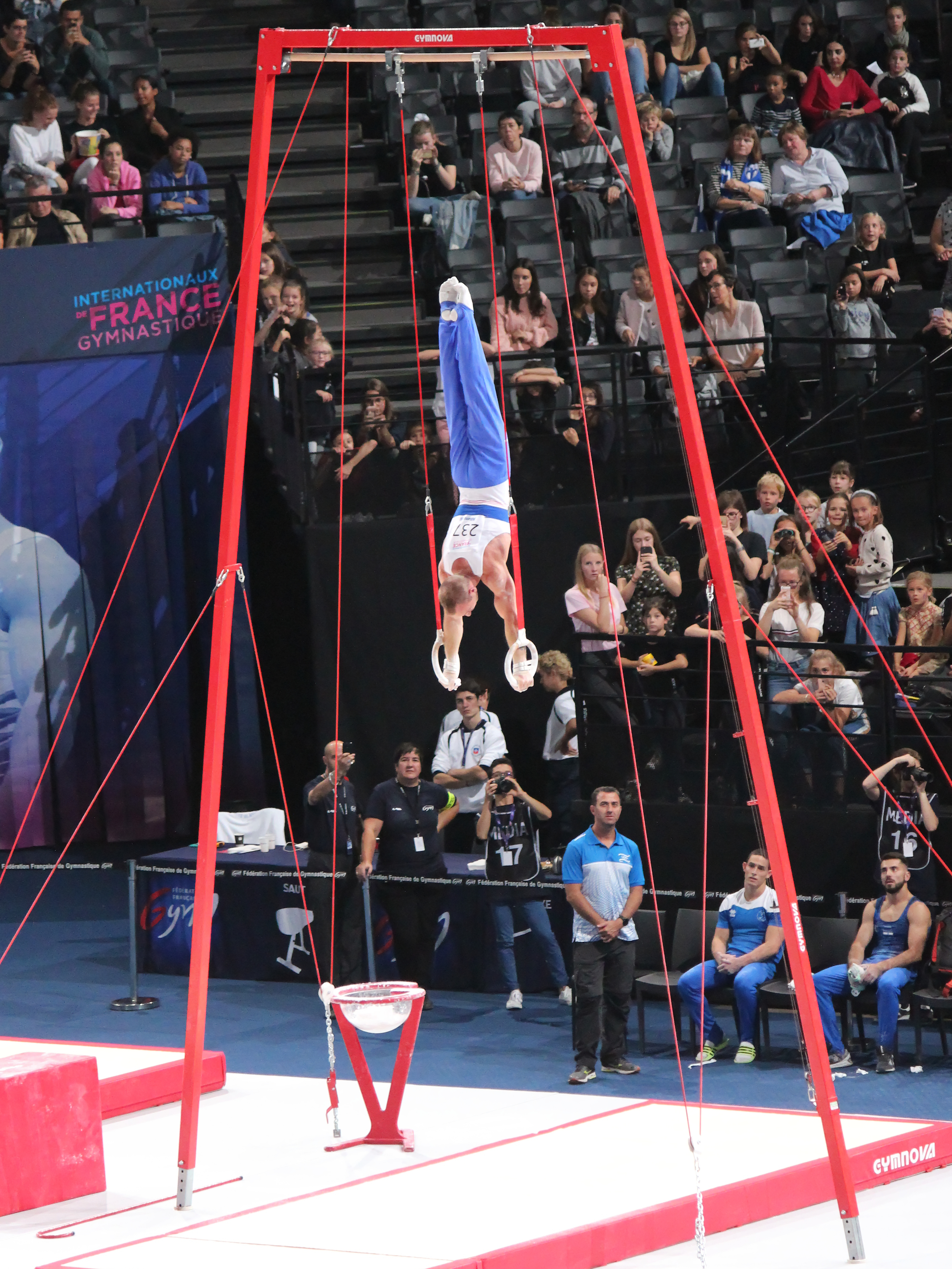
Julien Gobaux performing on the rings

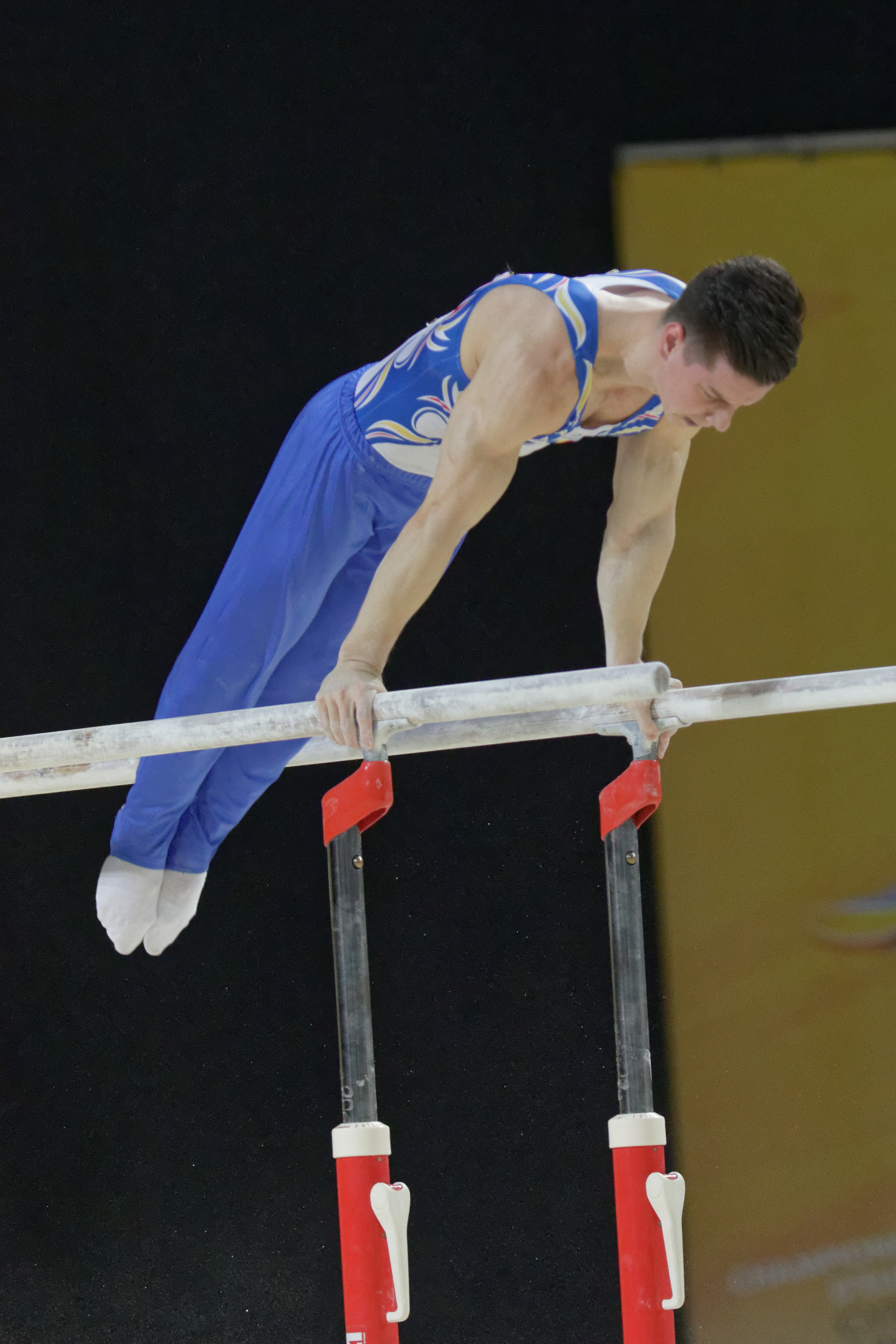
Andrei Muntean performing on parallel bars at the 2015 European Artistic Gymnastics Championships.

The rings are suspended on wire cable from a point 5.75 metres (18.9 ft) from the floor. The gymnast grips the rings and must perform a routine demonstrating balance, strength, power, and dynamic motion while preventing the rings themselves from swinging. At least one static strength move is required, but some gymnasts may include two or three. A routine ends with a dismount.

===== Vault =====
Gymnasts sprint down a runway, which is a maximum of 25 metres (82 ft) runway in length, before hurdling onto a springboard. They then land momentarily inverted on the hands-on the vaulting horse or vaulting table (pre-flight segment) and propel themselves forward or backward off that platform to a two-footed landing (post-flight segment). In advanced gymnastics, multiple twists and somersaults may be added in the post-flight segment before landing. Successful vaults depend on the speed of the run, the length of the hurdle, the power the gymnast generates from the legs and shoulder girdle, the kinesthetic awareness in the air, how well they stuck the landing, and the speed of rotation in the case of more difficult and complex vaults.

===== Parallel bars =====
Men perform on two bars set in parallel by executing a series of swings, balances, and releases that require great strength and coordination. The width between the bars is adjustable depending upon the actual needs of the gymnasts, and the bars are usually 2 metres (6.6 ft) high.

===== Horizontal bar =====
A 2.8 centimetres (1.1 in) thick steel bar raised 2.5 metres (8.2 ft) is raised the landing area. The gymnast holds on to the bar and performs giant swings or giants (forward or backward revolutions around the bar in the handstand position), release skills, twists, and changes of direction. By using the momentum from giants and then releasing at the proper point, enough height can be achieved for spectacular dismounts, such as a triple-back salto. Leather grips are usually used to help maintain a grip on the bar, and to prevent rips by reducing friction on the skin. While training for this event, straps are often used to ensure that the gymnasts do not fall off the bar as they are learning new skills.

=== Rhythmic gymnastics ===
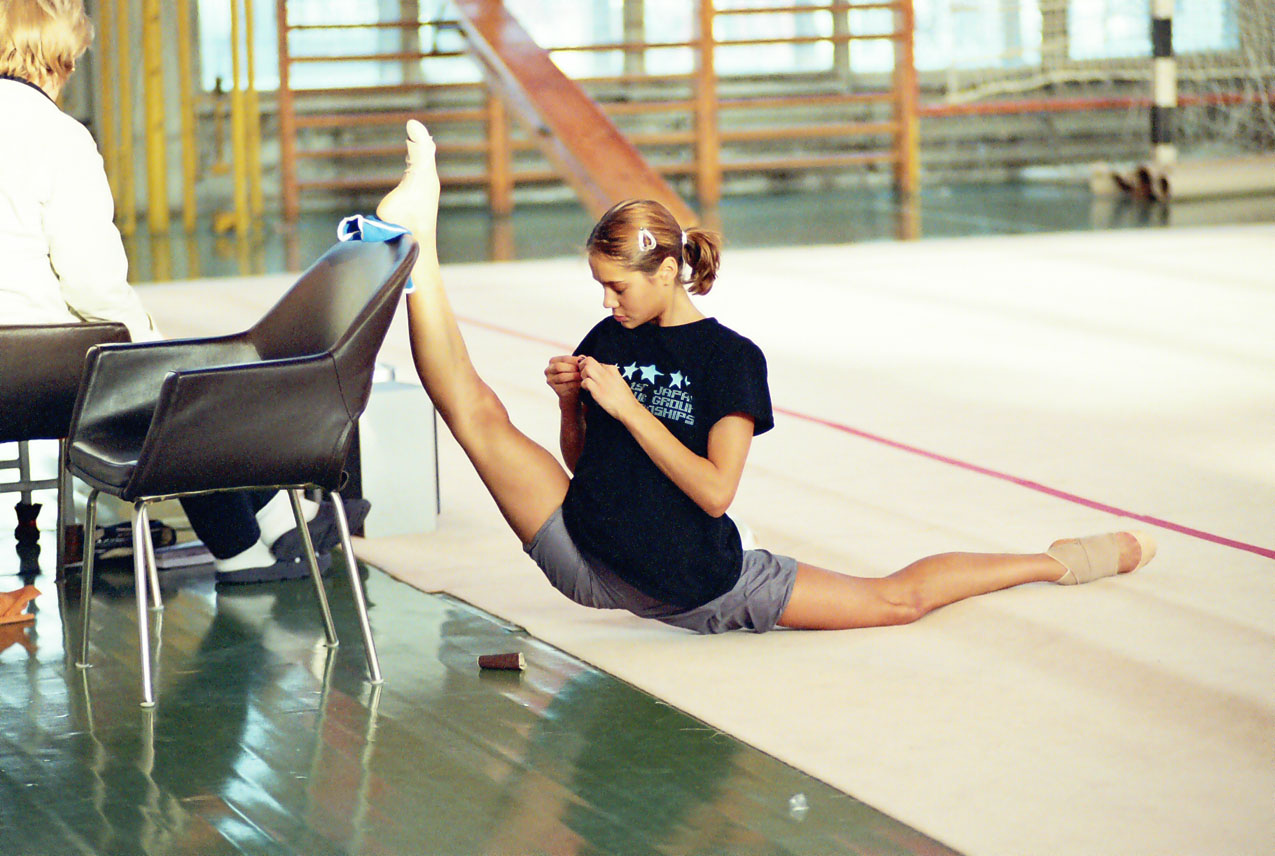
Russian rhythmic gymnast Irina Tchachina stretching in her warm-up before practice

According to FIG rules, only women compete in rhythmic gymnastics. This is a sport that combines elements of ballet, gymnastics, dance, and apparatus manipulation, with a much greater emphasis on the aesthetic rather than the acrobatic. Gymnasts compete either as individuals or in groups. Individuals perform four separate routines, each using one of the four apparatuses—ball, ribbon, hoop, clubs, and formerly, rope—on a floor area. Groups consist of five gymnasts who perform two routines together, one with five of the same apparatus and one with three of one apparatus and two of another; the FIG defines which apparatuses groups use each year.

Routines are given three sub-scores: difficulty, execution, and artistry. Difficulty is open-ended and based on the value given to the elements performed in the routine, and execution and artistry start at ten points and are lowered for specific mistakes made by the gymnasts. The three sub-scores are added together for the final score for each routine.

International competitions are split between Juniors, under sixteen by their year of birth, and Seniors, for women sixteen and over. Gymnasts in Russia and Europe typically start training at a very young age and those at their peak are typically in their late teens (15–19) or early twenties. The largest events in the sport are the Olympic Games, World Championships, European Championships, World Cup and Grand Prix series. The first World Championships were held in 1963, and rhythmic gymnastics made its first appearance at the Olympics in 1984.

==== Rhythmic gymnastics apparatus ====
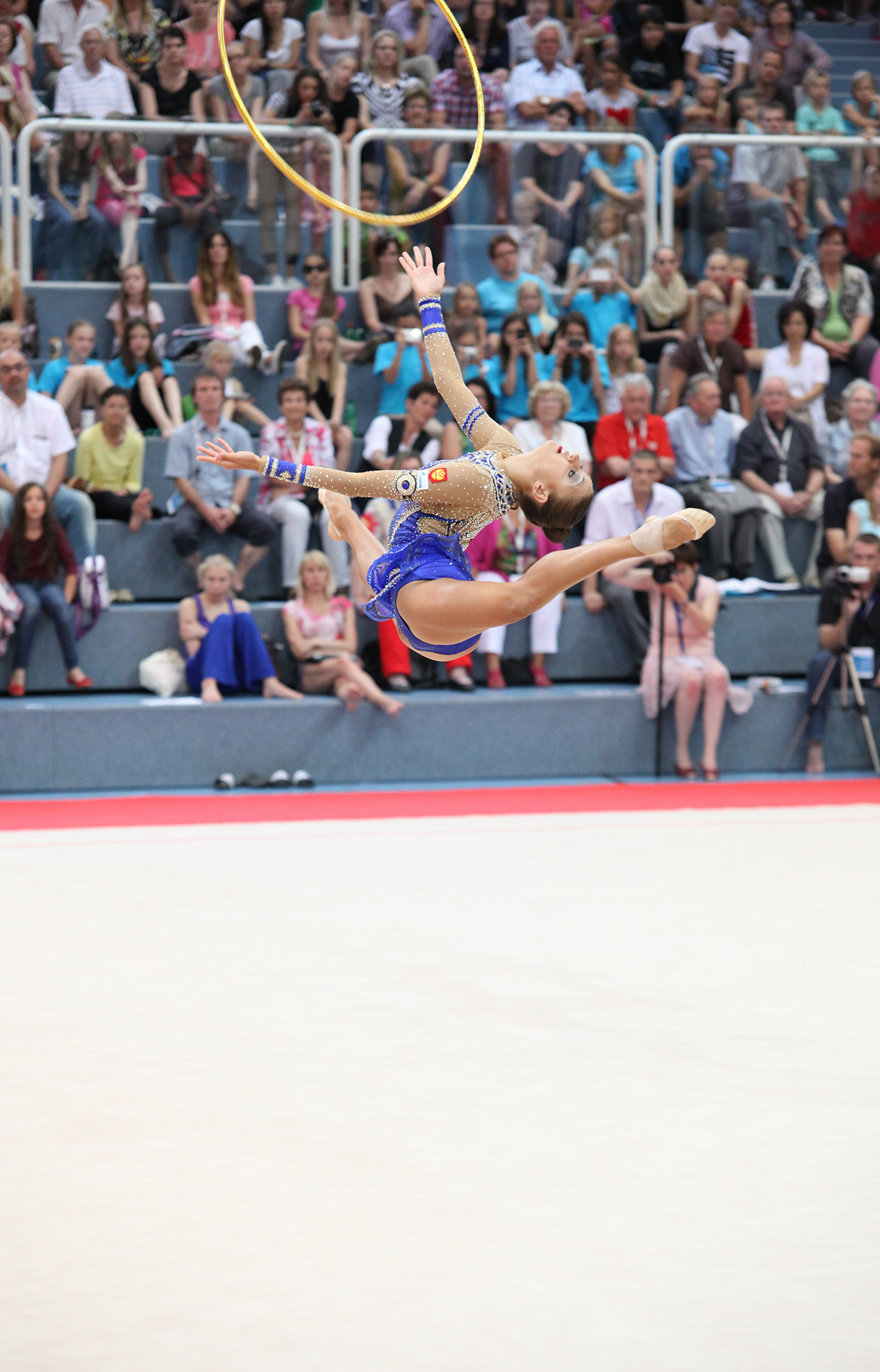
Evgenia Kanaeva doing a split leap in her hoop routine

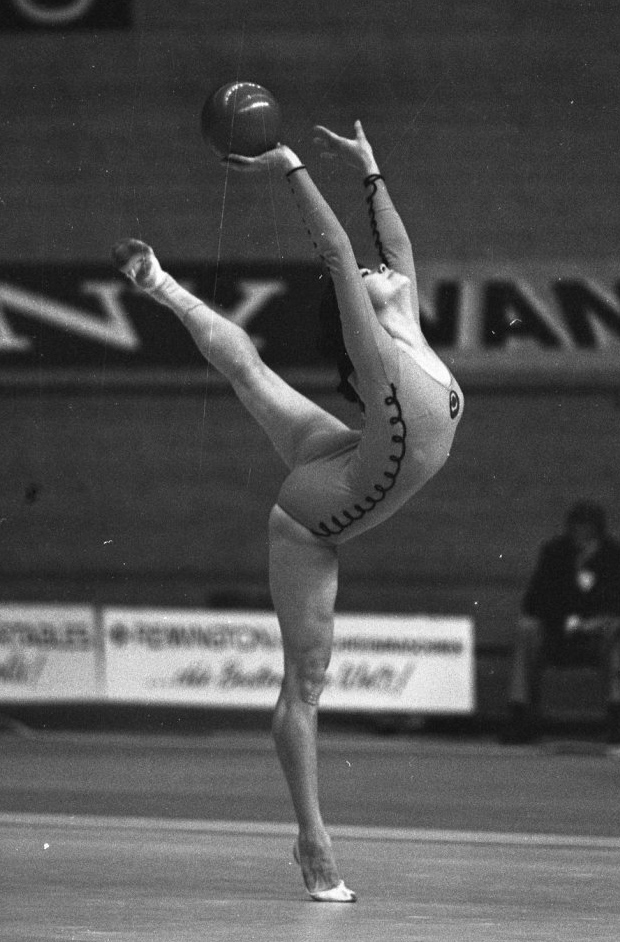
Soviet Galima Shugurova performing an attitude balance with her ball apparatus

Ball
The ball may be made of rubber or a similar synthetic material, and it can be of any color. It should rest in the gymnast's hand and not be pressed against the wrist or grasped with the fingers, which incurs a penalty. Fundamental elements of a ball routine include bouncing or rolling the ball.
Hoop
The hoop comes up to about the gymnast's hip. It may be made of plastic or wood, and it may be covered with adhesive tape either of the same or different color as the hoop, which may be in decorative patterns. Fundamental requirements of a hoop routine include rotation of the hoop around the hand or body, rolling the hoop on the body or floor, and the gymnast passing through the hoop.
Ribbon
The ribbon consists of a handle, which may be made of wood, bamboo, or synthetic materials such as fiberglass, and the ribbon itself, which is made of satin. The ribbon is six meters long, and due to its length, it can easily become tangled or knotted; knots must be undone or the gymnast will be penalized. Fundamental elements of a ribbon routine consist of making continuous shapes with the length of the fabric, such as tight circles (spirals) or waves (snakes), and elements called boomerangs, in which the gymnast tosses the handle, then pulls it back by the end of the ribbon and catches it.
Clubs
The clubs may be made of wood or synthetic materials, and they are always used in a pair. They may be connected together by inserting the end of one club into the head of the other. The handles and bodies are typically wrapped with decorative tapes. Fundamental elements of a clubs routine including swinging the heads of the clubs in circles, small throws in which the clubs rotate in the air, and asymmetrical movements.
Rope
The rope is made from hemp or a similar synthetic material; it can be knotted and have anti-slip material at the ends, but it does not have handles. The fundamental requirements of a rope routine include leaping and skipping. In 2011, the FIG decided to eliminate the use of rope in senior individual rhythmic gymnastics competitions. It is still sometimes seen in junior group competition.

==== Men's rhythmic gymnastics ====
There are two versions of rhythmic gymnastics for men, neither of which is currently recognized by the FIG. One was developed in Japan in the 1940s and was originally practiced by both boys and girls for fitness, with women still occasionally participating on the club level today. Gymnasts either perform in groups with no apparatus, or individually with apparatus (stick, clubs, rope, or double rings). Unlike women's rhythmic gymnastics, it is performed on a sprung floor, and the gymnasts perform acrobatic moves and flips. The first World Championships was held in 2003. The other version was developed in Europe and uses generally the same rules as the women and the same set of apparatus. It is most prominent in Spain, which has held national men's competitions since 2009 and mixed-gender group competitions since 2021, and France. There currently is no World Championships for this form of Men's Rhythmic Gymnastics.

=== Trampolining ===
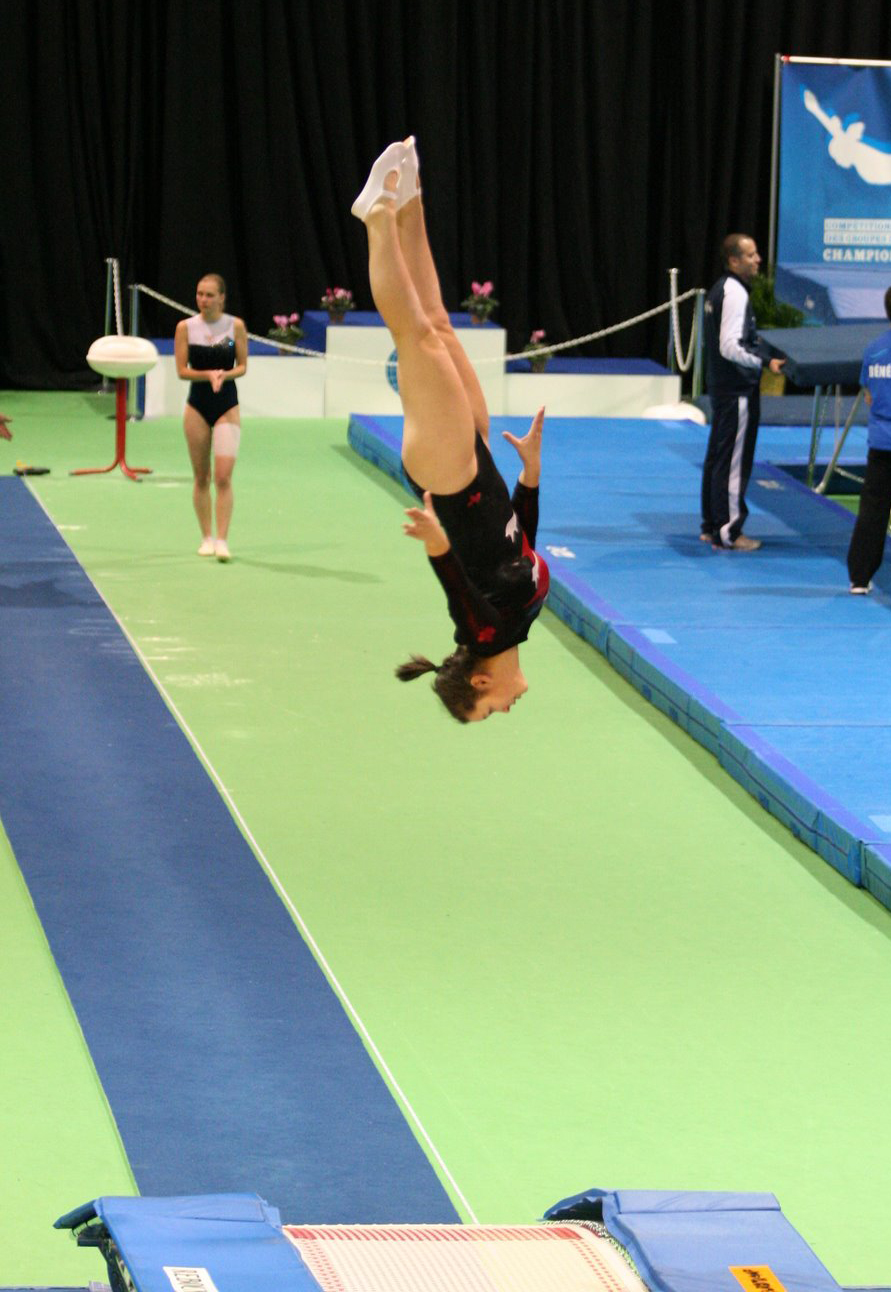
Double mini-trampoline competitor

==== Trampolining ====
Trampolining and tumbling consists of four events, individual and synchronized trampoline, double mini trampoline, and tumbling (also known as power tumbling or rod floor). Since 2000, individual trampoline has been included in the Olympic Games. The first World Championships were held in 1964.

===== Individual trampoline =====
Individual routines in trampolining involve a build-up phase, during which the gymnast jumps repeatedly to achieve height, followed by a sequence of ten bounces without pause during which the gymnast performs a sequence of aerial skills. Routines are marked out of a maximum score of 10 points. Additional points (with no maximum at the highest levels of competition) can be earned depending on the difficulty of the moves and the length of time taken to complete the ten skills which is an indication of the average height of the jumps. In high level competitions, there are two preliminary routines, one which has only two moves scored for difficulty and one where the athlete is free to perform any routine. This is followed by a final routine, which is again optional (that is, the gymnast is allowed to perform whichever skills they choose). Some competitions restart the score from zero for the finals, while others add the final score to the preliminary results.

===== Synchronized trampoline =====
Synchronized trampoline is similar except that both competitors must perform the routine together and marks are awarded for synchronization as well as the form and difficulty of the moves.

===== Double-mini trampoline =====
Double mini trampoline involves a smaller trampoline with a run-up; two scoring moves are performed per routine. Moves cannot be repeated in the same order on the double-mini during a competition. Skills can be repeated if a skill is competed as a mounter in one routine and a dismount in another. The scores are marked in a similar manner to individual trampoline.

=== Tumbling ===
In tumbling, athletes perform an explosive series of flips and twists down a sprung tumbling track. Scoring is similar to trampolining. Tumbling was originally contested as one of the events in Men's Artistic Gymnastics at the 1932 Summer Olympics, and in 1955 and 1959 at the Pan American Games. From 1974 to 1998 it was included as an event for both genders at the Acrobatic Gymnastics World Championships. The event has also been contested since 1976 at the Trampoline and Tumbling World Championships.

Tumbling is competed along a 25-metre sprung tack with a 10-metre run up. A tumbling pass or run is a combination of 8 skills, with an entry skill, normally a round-off, to whips (similar to a handspring without hand support) and into an end skill. Usually the end skill is the hardest skill of the pass. At the highest level, gymnasts perform transitional skills. These are skills which are not whips, but are double or triple somersaults (usually competed at the end of the run), but now competed in the middle of the run connected before and after by either a whip or a flick.

Competition is made up of a qualifying round and a finals round. There are two different types of competition in tumbling, individual and team. In the team event three gymnasts out of a team of four compete one run each, if one run fails the final member of the team is allowed to compete with the three highest scores being counted. In the individual event qualification, the competitor will compete two runs, one a straight pass (including double and triple somersaults) and a twisting pass (including full twisting whips and combination skills such as a full twisting double straight 'full in back'). In the final of the individual event, the competitor must compete two different runs which can be either twisting or straight but each run normally uses both types (using transition skills).

=== Acrobatic gymnastics ===
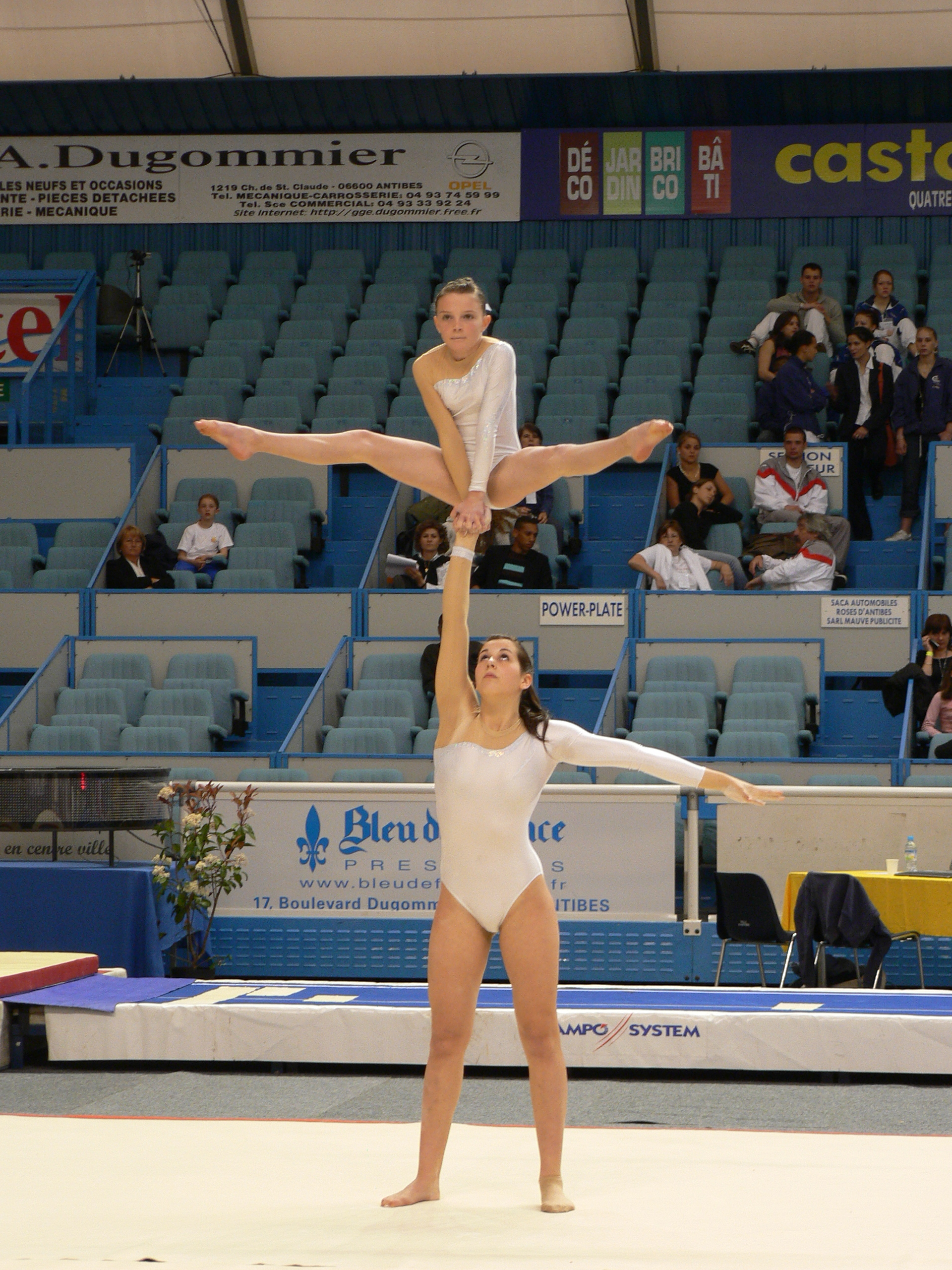
Acrobatic women's pair performing a skill

Acrobatic gymnastics (formerly sport acrobatics), often referred to as acro, acrobatic sports or simply sports acro, is a group gymnastic discipline for both men and women. Acrobats perform to music in groups of two, three and four.

There are four international age categories: 11–16, 12–18, 13–19, and Senior (15+), which are used in the World Championships and many other events around the world, including the European Championships and the World Games.

All levels require a balance routine, which focuses on held balance skills, and a dynamic routine, which focuses on flipping elements; 12–18, 13–19, and Seniors are also required to perform a final (combined) routine.

Currently, acrobatic gymnastics scores are marked out of 30.00 for juniors, and they can be higher at the Senior FIG level based on difficulty:

- Difficulty – An open score, which is the sum of the difficulty values of elements (valued from the tables of difficulties) successfully performed in an exercise, divided by 100. This score is unlimited in senior competitions.
- Execution – Judges give a score out of 10.00 for technical performance (how well the skills are executed), which is then doubled to emphasize its importance.
- Artistic – Judges give a score out of 10.00 for artistry (the overall performance of the routine, namely choreography).

There are five competitive event categories:

- Women's Pairs
- Mixed Pairs
- Men's Pairs
- Women's Groups (3 women)
- Men's Groups (4 men)

The World Championships have been held since 1974.

=== Aerobic gymnastics ===
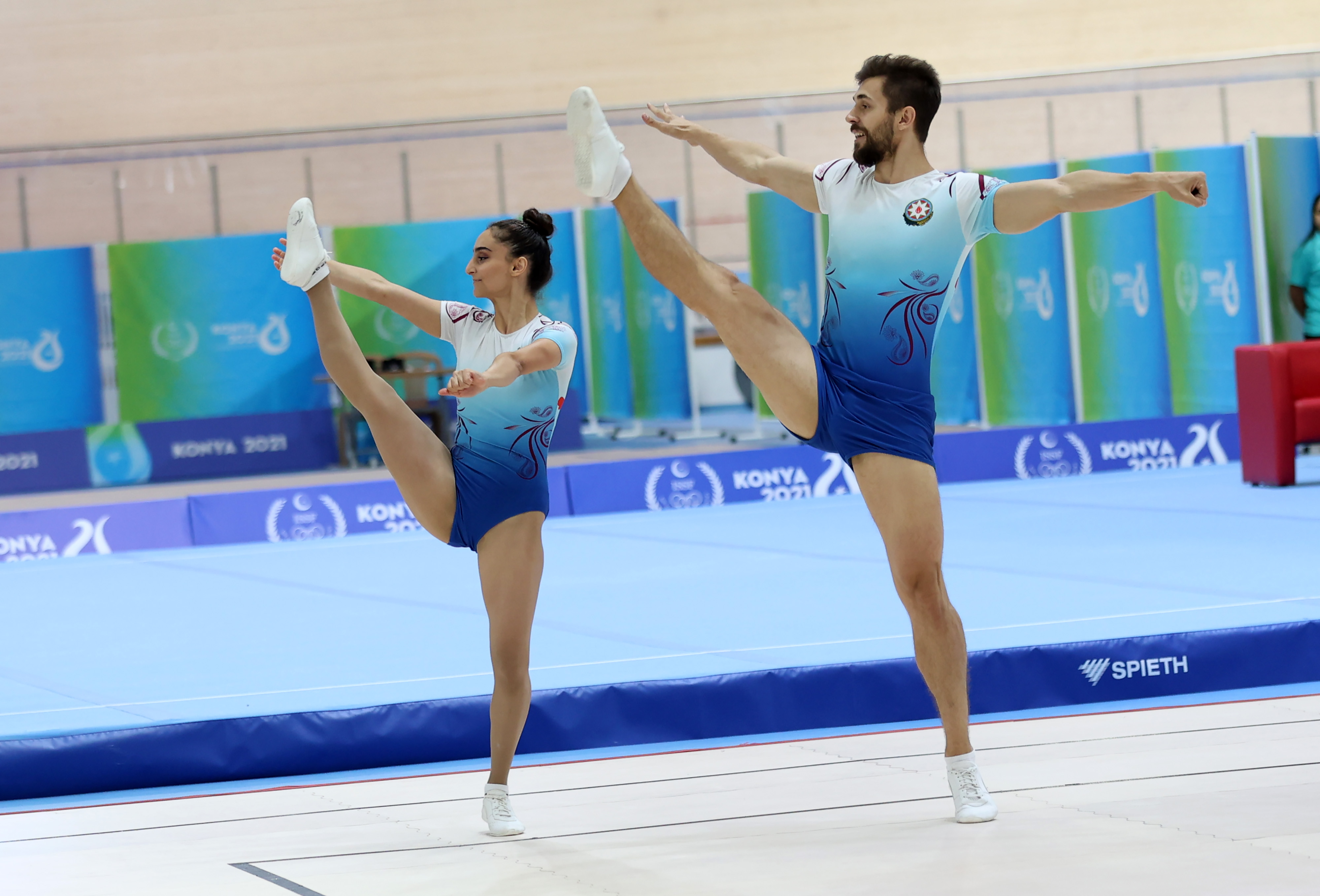
A mixed pair performing aerobic gymnastics

Aerobic gymnastics (formally sport aerobics) involves the performance of routines by individuals, pairs, trios, groups with 5 people, and aerobic dance and aerobic step (8 people). Strength, flexibility, and aerobic fitness rather than acrobatic or balance skills are emphasized. Seniors perform routines on a 10 m (33 ft) x 10 m (33 ft) floor, with a smaller 7 m (23 ft) x 7 m (23 ft) floor used for younger participants. Routines last 70–90 seconds depending on the age of the participants and the routine category. The World Championships have been held since 1995.

The events consist of:

- Individual Women
- Individual Men
- Mixed Pairs
- Trios
- Groups
- Dance
- Step

=== Parkour ===
On 28 January 2018, parkour, also known as freerunning, was given the go-ahead to begin development as a FIG sport. The FIG was planning to run World Cup competitions from 2018 onwards. The first Parkour World Championships were planned for 2020, but were delayed due to the COVID-19 pandemic, and instead took place from 15 to 16 October 2022 in Tokyo, Japan.

The events consist of:

- Speedrun
- Freestyle

=== Para-gymnastics ===
Para-gymnastics, gymnastics for disabled athletes with para-athletics classifications, was recognized as a new FIG discipline in October 2024. As an FIG discipline, it currently only covers artistic gymnastics.

== Other disciplines ==
The following disciplines are not currently recognized by the Fédération Internationale de Gymnastique.

=== Aesthetic group gymnastics ===
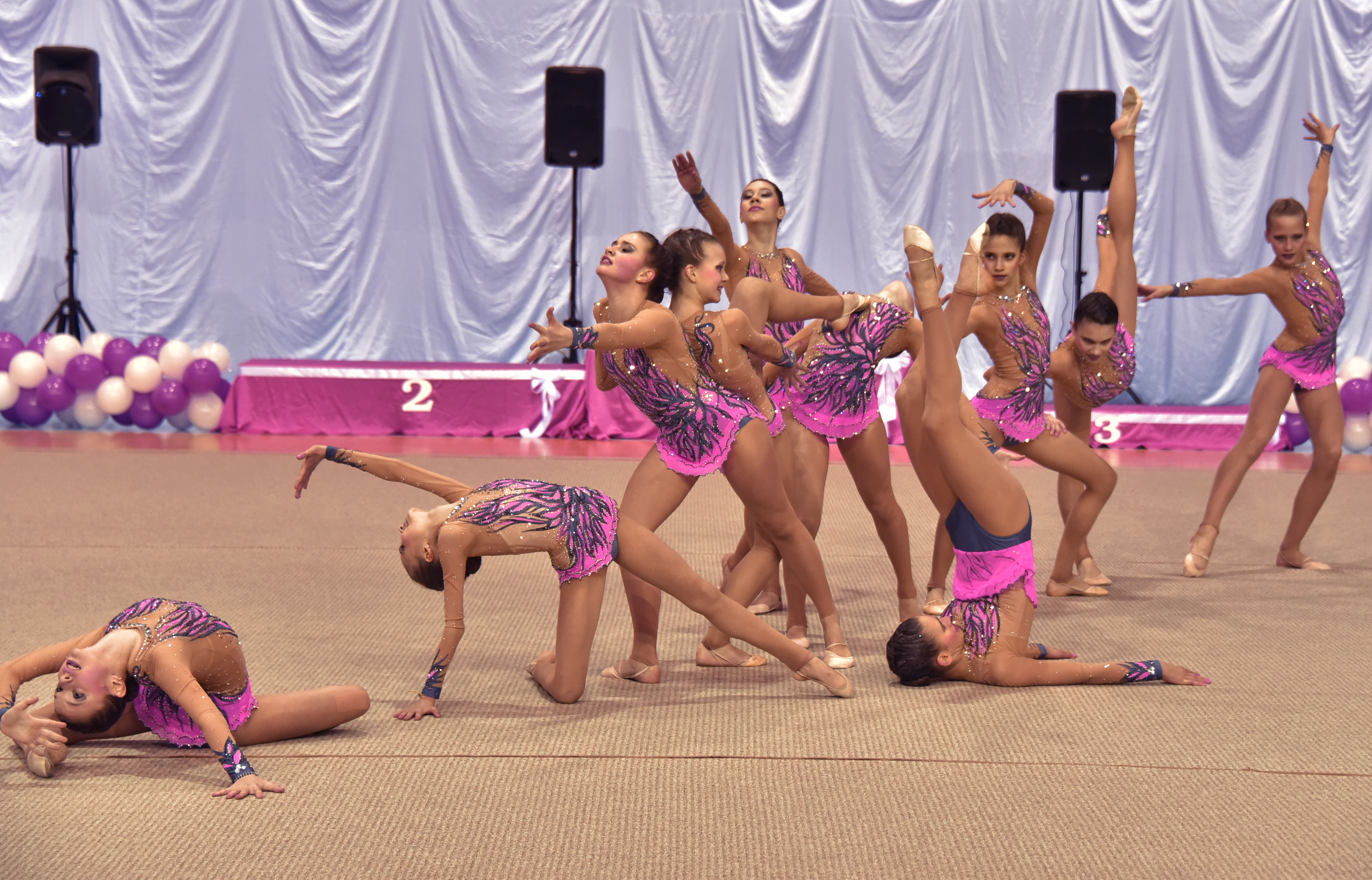
An aesthetic group gymnastics team performing a routine

Aesthetic Group Gymnastics (AGG) was developed from the Finnish "naisvoimistelu". It differs from rhythmic gymnastics in that body movement is large and continuous and teams are larger, and athletes do not use apparatus in international AGG competitions. The sport requires physical qualities such as flexibility, balance, speed, strength, coordination and sense of rhythm where movements of the body are emphasized through the flow, expression and aesthetic appeal. A good performance is characterized by uniformity and simultaneity. The competition program consists of versatile and varied body movements, such as body waves, swings, balances, pivots, jumps and leaps, dance steps, and lifts. The International Federation of Aesthetic Group Gymnastics (IFAGG) was established in 2003. The first Aesthetic Group Gymnastics World Championships was held in 2000.

=== TeamGym ===
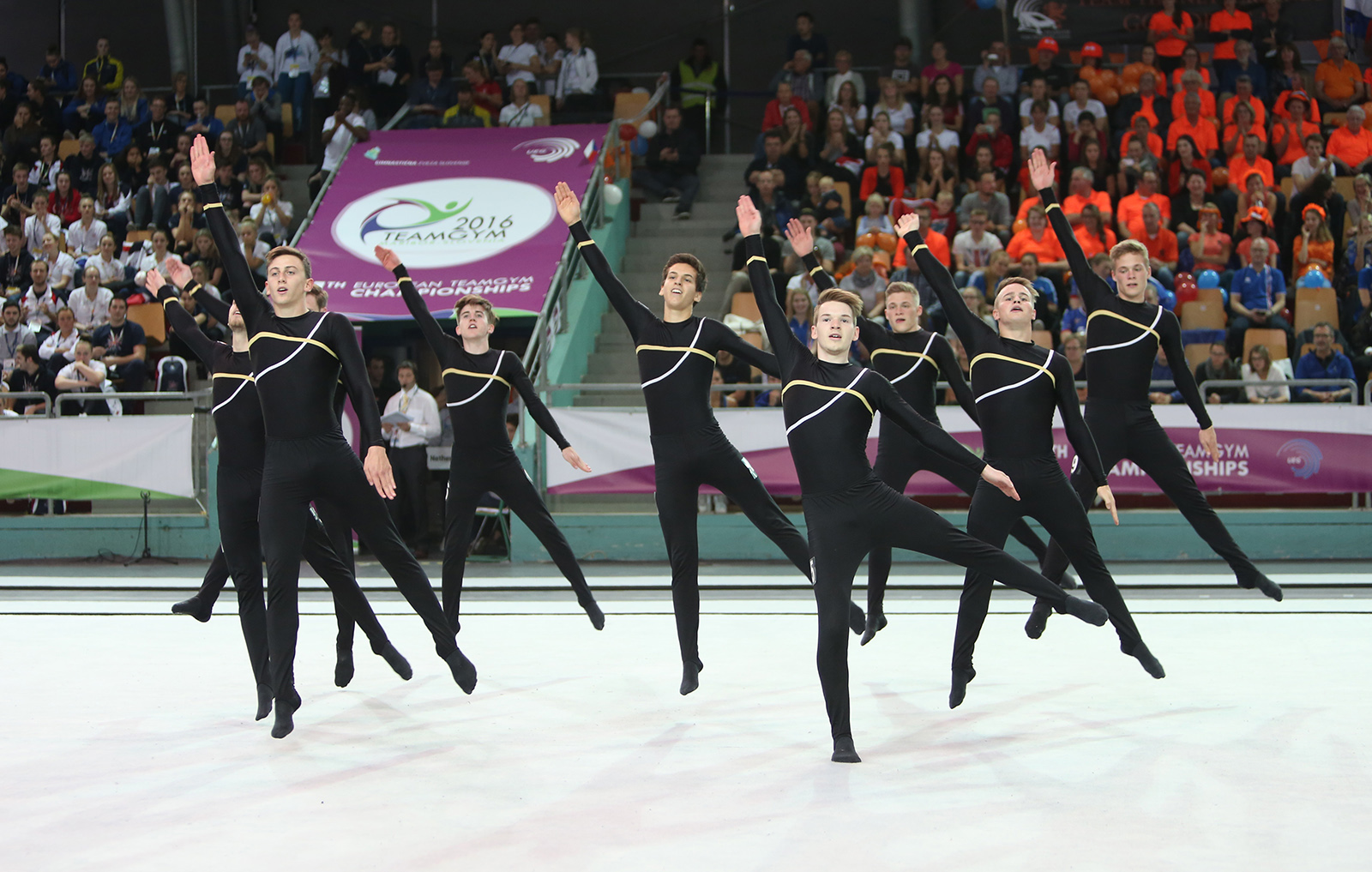
A TeamGym performance on floor

TeamGym is a form of competition created by the European Union of Gymnastics, originally named EuroTeam. The first official competition was held in Finland in 1996. TeamGym events consist of three sections: women, men and mixed teams. Athletes compete in three different disciplines: floor, tumbling and trampette. Teams require effective teamwork and tumbling technique. There is no World Championships; however, there has been a European Championships held since 2010.

=== Wheel gymnastics ===
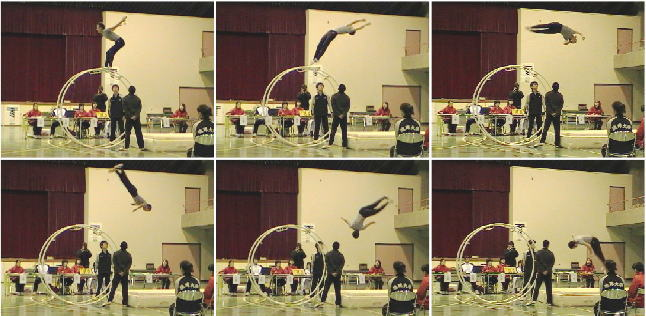
A gymnast dismounts the wheel in vault

Wheel gymnasts do exercises in a large wheel known as the Rhönrad, gymnastics wheel, gym wheel, or German wheel. It has also been known as the ayro wheel, aero wheel, and Rhon rod.

There are four core categories of exercise: straight line, spiral, vault and cyr wheel. The first World Championships was held in 1995.

=== Mallakhamba ===
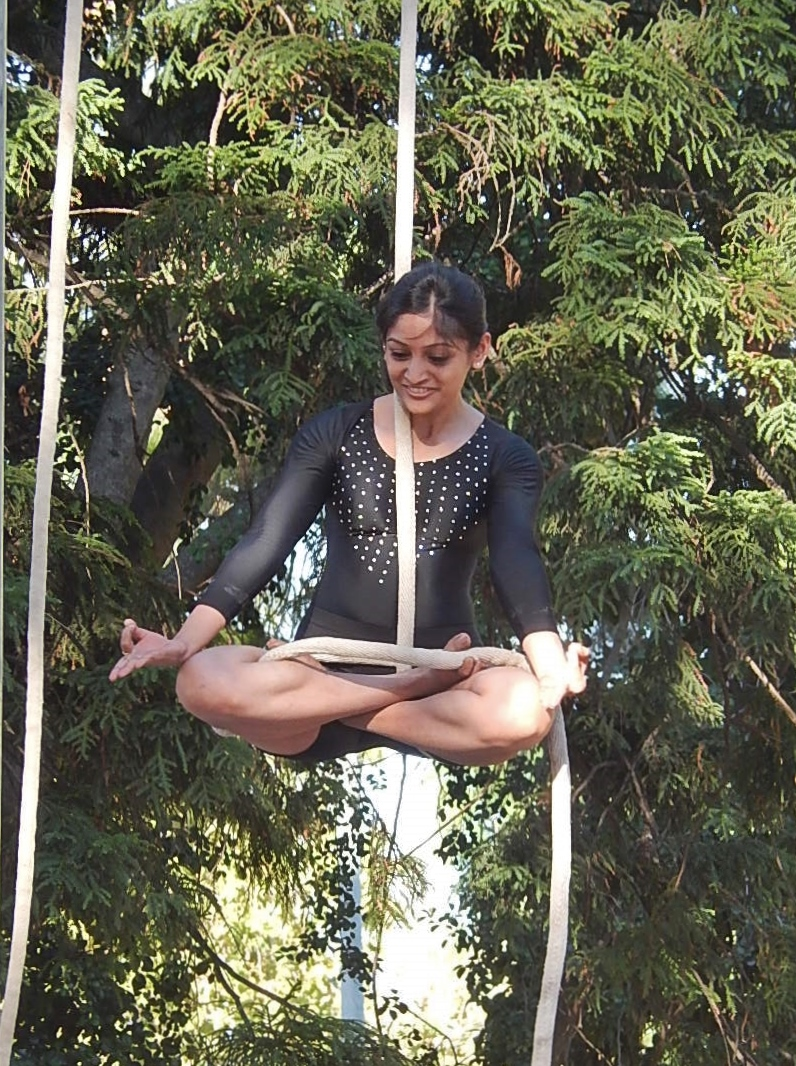
Rope mallakhamba

Mallakhamba (Marathi: मल्लखम्ब) is a traditional Indian sport in which a gymnast performs feats and poses in concert with a vertical wooden pole or rope. The word also refers to the pole used in the sport.

Mallakhamba derives from the terms malla which denotes a wrestler and khamba which means a pole. Mallakhamba can therefore be translated to English as "pole gymnastics". On 9 April 2013, the Indian state of Madhya Pradesh declared mallakhamba as the state sport. In February 2019 the first Mallahkhamb World Championship was held in Mumbai

== Non-competitive gymnastics ==
General gymnastics, also known as "gymnastics for all", enables people of all ages and abilities to participate in performance groups of 6 to more than 150 athletes. Unlike other forms of gymnastics General Gymnastics is more of a sports program or performing art than a sport. Any "event" from any discipline of gymnastics can be performed and it's not uncommon to see for example still rings event followed by synchronized trampolone followed by step from aerobic gymnastics or even events not currently recognized in gymnastics like aerial silk. They can perform synchronized, choreographed routines. Troupes may consist of both genders and are separated into age divisions. The largest general gymnastics exhibition is the quadrennial World Gymnaestrada, which was first held in 1939. In 1984 gymnastics for all was officially recognized first as a sport program by the FIG (International Gymnastic Federation), and subsequently by national gymnastic federations worldwide with participants that now number 30 million. Non-competitive gymnastics is considered useful for its health benefits.

== Scoring (code of points) ==
An artistic gymnast's score comes from deductions taken from the start value of a routine's elements. The start value of a routine is based on the difficulty of the elements the gymnast attempts and whether or not the gymnast meets composition requirements. The composition requirements are different for each apparatus. This score is called the D score. Deductions in execution and artistry are taken from a maximum of 10.0. This score is called the E score. The final score is calculated by adding the D and E score.

The current method of scoring, by adding D and E score to give the final score has been in place since 2006. The current method is called "open-end" scoring because there is no theoretical cap (although there is practical cap) to the D-score and hence the total possible score for a routine. Before 2006, a gymnast's final score is deducted from a possible maximum of 10 for a routine.

A Code of Points or guidelines of scoring a routine's difficulty and execution is slightly revised for each quadrennium, or period of four years culminating in the Olympics year.

== Former apparatus and events ==
=== Rope climbing ===
Generally, competitors climbed either a 6 m (20 ft) or an 8 m (26 ft) long, 38 mm (1.5 in) diameter natural fiber rope for speed, starting from a seated position on the floor and using only the hands and arms. Kicking the legs was normally permitted. Many gymnasts can do this in the straddle or pike position, which eliminates the help generated from the legs, though it can be done with legs as well.

=== Flying rings ===
Flying rings was an event similar to still rings, but with the performer executing a series of stunts while swinging. It was a gymnastic event sanctioned by both the NCAA and the AAU until the early 1960s.

=== Club swinging ===
Club swinging, a.k.a. Indian clubs, was an event in men's artistic gymnastics sometime up until the 1950s. It was similar to the clubs in both women's and men's rhythmic gymnastics, but much simpler, with few throws allowed. It was included in the 1904 and 1932 Summer Olympic Games.

=== Other (men's artistic) ===
- Team horizontal bar and parallel bar in the 1896 Summer Olympics
- Team free and Swedish system in the 1912 and 1920 Summer Olympics
- Combined and triathlon in the 1904 Summer Olympics
- Side horse vault in 1924 Summer Olympics
- Tumbling in the 1932 Summer Olympics

=== Other (women's artistic) ===
- Team exercise at the 1928, 1936, and 1948 Summer Olympics
- Parallel bars at the 1938 World Championships
- Team portable apparatus at the 1952 and 1956 Summer Olympics

== Health and safety ==
Gymnastics is one of the most dangerous sports, with a very high injury rate seen in girls age 11 to 18.

Some gymnastic movements which were allowed in past competitions are now banned for safety reasons; for example, the Thomas salto, a twisting salto landed with a forward roll on the floor, was banned after several injuries. Elena Mukhina, the 1978 World all-around champion, broke her neck while practicing the skill in an exhausted state and became quadriplegic. The vaulting table replaced the old vaulting horse in the early 2000s and an additional mat was added around the springboard for safety reasons after several female gymnasts, such as Julissa Gomez, became paralyzed during vaulting attempts.

=== Landing ===
In a tumbling pass, dismount, or vault, landing is the final phase, following take-off and flight. This is a critical skill in terms of execution in competition scores, general performance, and injury occurrence. Without the necessary magnitude of energy dissipation during impact, the risk of sustaining injuries during somersaulting increases. These injuries commonly occur at the lower extremities such as cartilage lesions, ligament tears, and bone bruises/fractures. To avoid such injuries, and to receive a high-performance score, proper technique must be used by the gymnast. "The subsequent ground contact or impact landing phase must be achieved using a safe, aesthetic, and well-executed double foot landing." A successful landing in gymnastics is classified as soft, meaning the knee and hip joints are at greater than 63 degrees of flexion.

A higher flight phase results in a higher vertical ground reaction force. Vertical ground reaction force (vGRF) represents an external force which the gymnasts have to overcome with their muscle force and affects the gymnasts' linear and angular momentum. Another important variable that affects linear and angular momentum is the time the landing takes. Gymnasts can decrease the impact force by increasing the time taken to perform the landing. Gymnasts can achieve this by increasing hip, knee and ankle amplitude i.e. increase the range of motion of those joints as they land.

=== Podium training ===
Podium training refers to the official practice session before a gymnastics competition begins. The purpose of this is to enable competing gymnasts to get a feel for the competition equipment inside the arena in which they will be competing, primarily for reasons of safety.

=== Physical injuries ===
Compared to athletes who play other sports, gymnasts are at higher than average risk of overuse injuries and injuries caused by early sports specialization among children and young adults. Gymnasts are at particular risk of foot and wrist injuries. Strength training can help prevent injuries.

=== Abuse ===
There have been recorded cases of emotional and sexual abuse in gymnastics in many different countries. The USA Gymnastics sex abuse scandal is considered one of the largest abuse scandals in sports history. In 2022, the Whyte Review was published, criticizing extensive abusive practices by British Gymnastics that included sexual and emotional abuse and excessive weight management of athletes.

=== Height concerns ===
Gymnasts tend to have short stature, but it is unlikely that the sport affects their growth. Parents of gymnasts tend also to be shorter than average.

== See also ==
- Acro dance
- Acrobatics
- Cheerleading
- Fitkid
- Glossary of gymnastics terms
- Gymnasium (ancient Greece)
- International Gymnastics Hall of Fame
- List of acrobatic activities
- List of gymnastics competitions
- List of gymnastics terms
- List of gymnasts
- Major achievements in gymnastics by nation
- Majorettes
- NCAA Men's Gymnastics championship (US)
- NCAA Women's Gymnastics championship (US)
- Trampolining
- Tricking
- Turners
- Uniform (gymnastics)
- World Gymnastics Championships
