= Norah Demierre =

Swiss rhythmic gymnast (born 2007)

- Born: 12 February 2007 (age 19) Lausanne, Vaud

Gymnastics career
- Discipline: Rhythmic gymnastics
- Country represented: Switzerland (2021-)
- Club: FSG Lucens
- Head coach: Alicia Marmonier

Norah Demierre (born 12 February 2007) is a Swiss individual rhythmic gymnast.

== Early life ==
Demierre was born on 12 February 2007 and has an older sister and a younger brother. She participated in judo as a child, but she quit when she was 8. Her mother had a dream in which Demierre was performing rhythmic gymnastics. Afterward, she showed Demierre a video of the sport, which made her want to practice it, although she was already considered to be on the older side for beginning rhythmic gymnastics.

Outside of gymnastics, she enjoys drawing and baking.

== Career ==
Demierre trains in Puidoux and Morges. She and her parents have spoken to the media both about the expense of training in rhythmic gymnastics and the training conditions in Switzerland; for example, there are no training halls in Morges with sufficiently high ceilings for training throws of the apparatus. After the 2023 season, she noted that she did not compete at international competitions very often compared to other European gymnasts and that she wanted to do so more often, as she considered it important for building a reputation and becoming known to the judges, but that each one came with a significant cost. She spoke about her efforts to find sponsors, one of whom was her godmother Swiss athlete Léa Sprunger, and estimated that the annual cost of her training was 55,000 Swiss francs.

Demierre competed at the 2021 Junior European Championships as a member of the Swiss group; she competed in both of their routines.

In February 2022, she won her first medal at an International Gymnastics Federation-sanctioned competition when she won bronze with the hoop at the Gracia Fair Cup in Budapest. In June, she competed at the Junior European Championships, along with her teammates Sophia Carlotta Chiariello and Lauren Grüniger. She competed with clubs and ribbon, placing 18th and 19th respectively, and the Swiss team finished in 18th place in the team competition.

She began competing as a senior in 2023. She was chosen to compete at the European Championships, where she finished in 26th place in the all-around qualifications, the best result for a Swiss gymnast there since 1982, when Grazia Verzasconi placed 25th. She also competed at the World Challenge Cup stage in Portimão, Portugal, where she qualified for the clubs final. At the Swiss National Championships, she won the all-around and all four apparatus finals. Afterward, she said, "I am very happy and satisfied with my achievements. I trained hard for it, and it paid off." She was selected to compete at the 2023 World Championships in Valencia, Spain, where she finished in 43rd place in the all-around qualifications.

In March 2024, Demierre competed at her first Grand Prix event in Marbella, Spain, where she placed 13th in the all-around. In April, she competed at her first World Cup event in Baku, and she placed 29th in the all-around after making mistakes in her ball and hoop exercises before having stronger ribbon and clubs routines.

She was selected to compete at the European Championships, held in May in Budapest. However, she injured her foot in training shortly before the competition and had to take six weeks off, and she withdrew. She was replaced by Nayenne Pollini Ashenaffi.

In 2025, she competed at the Grand Prix stage in Thiais, France, where she placed 16th in the all-around. Later in the year, she competed at the Swiss National Championships, held 31 May and 1 June. She finished second in the all-around and won the clubs final.

The next year, Demierre competed at the 2026 European Championships in May, where she had a goal of placing in the top 30; she did so by finishing 26th. In June, she again won silver in the all-around Swiss National Championships, and she also took silver in all four apparatus finals.

== Achievements ==
- First Swiss rhythmic gymnast to qualify for an individual apparatus final at a World Challenge Cup at the 2023 stage in Portimão.
