= Lauren Grüniger =

Swiss rhythmic gymnast (born 2007)

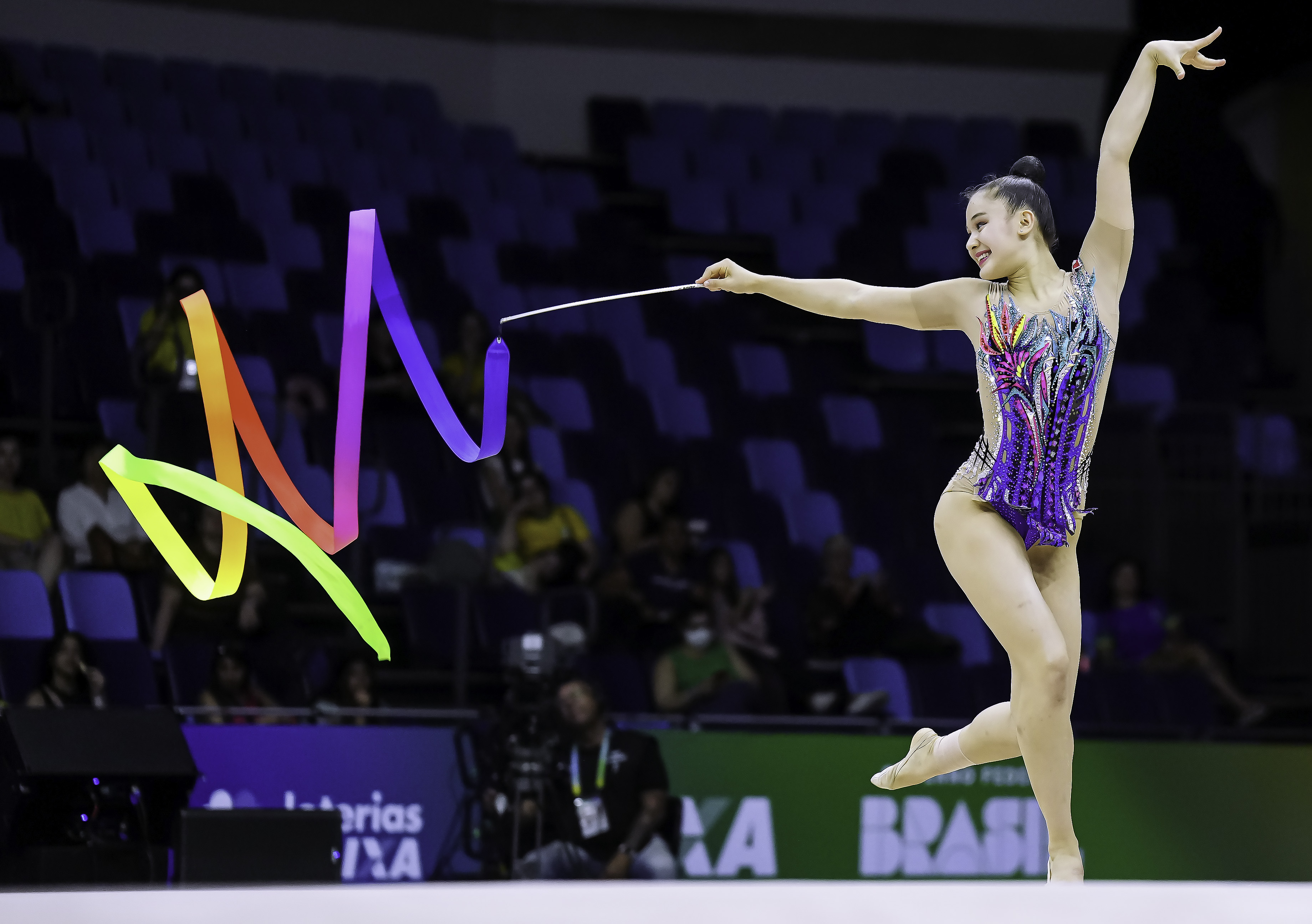
- Lauren Grüniger at the 2025 Rhythmic Gymnastics World Championships

Personal information
- Born: 3 February 2007 (age 19) Zurich, Switzerland

Gymnastics career
- Discipline: Rhythmic gymnastics
- Country represented: Switzerland (2021-present)
- Club: Glarner Turnverband
- Gym: Stützpunkt Zürich
- Head coach: Karina Pfennig / Natalia Raskina

Lauren Grüniger (international spelling Grueniger), (born 3 February 2007) is a Swiss individual rhythmic gymnast.

== Personal life ==
Grüniger was born in Zurich to a Swiss father and a Singaporean mother, and she has a younger sister. She grew up speaking German and English. She is also fluent in Italian and Russian, and she has studied French.

== Career ==
At ten years old in 2017, Grüniger attended a training camp in Moscow. She asked her parents if she could stay to continue training. After a long discussion, her father agreed to let her live there with a host family, as the training conditions were better there than in Switzerland; for example, there was ample access to training areas with sprung floors that reduce the impact of jumps, while there was only one intermittently available in Switzerland. She attended a German school and continued to train in Moscow through at least the end of 2021. Grüniger spoke positively about her experiences training in Russia.

=== Junior ===
In 2021, as a junior, Grüniger won her first medal at a FIG tournament in June, a bronze. She also had the highest score of all gymnasts at the Swiss National Championships that year.

In 2022, she competed in the junior event at the Irina Cup, which was used as a selection event for the European Championships by the Swiss Gymnastics Federation. She won the bronze medal in the ball final. She was selected for the junior team at the European Championships and competed with ball only; she was 24th with that apparatus, and she and her teammates placed 18th in the team competition.

=== Senior ===
Grüniger began competing as a senior in 2023. Her first international senior competition was the Gymnastik International in March, where she placed 10th and qualified for the hoop and ball finals. She was selected for the 2023 European Championships along with Norah Demierre, and she placed 42nd in the all-around qualifications.

She injured her foot during mandatory sports lesson at her school in December 2023 and took months off training to recover. She did not compete in early 2024, but returned to compete at the Swiss National Championships in June, where she won silver in the all-around behind Sophia Carlotta Chiariello.

In 2025, she competed at the World Challenge Cup in Portimão, where she placed 12th in the all-around and qualified for the clubs and ribbon finals. At the Swiss National Championships, she won the senior title and three of the four event finals. In June, she competed at her second European Championships, where she placed 30th in the all-around qualifications and narrowly missed qualifying to the final. She said afterward, "Of course I'm disappointed, but I'm also proud of my performance." She also competed at the 2025 Summer World University Games in July, where she placed 12th in the all-around.

She was selected to represent Switzerland at her first World Championships in August 2025, and ahead of the Championships, she trained in Germany. At the World Championships, she placed 30th in the all-around qualifications.

In fall 2025, she competed for the German club Bremen 1860 in the domestic German Bundesliga, where she received one of the highest scores of the competition; Bremen 1860 won third place over TB Oppau at the finals in Fellbach Schmiden. This was the best result for Bremen 1860 since joining the Erste Bundesliga in the year 2020.

Her first international competition in 2026 was the Grand Prix Miss Valentine in Tartu, Estonia. She finished 15th in the all-around and took 4th place in the club final. In March, she won the bronze medal in the all-around at Gymnastik International in Fellbach Schmiden, Germany. A week later, she won another bronze medal in the all-around at MTM Tournament in Ljubljana.

Grüniger competed at the 2026 European Championships in May, where she had a goal of placing in the top 30; she did so by finishing 25th. In June, she retained her title at the Swiss National Championships and also won all four apparatus finals.

She was then selected to represent Switzerland at the World Championships, held in Frankfurt in August. After a good first day, she was the first gymnast to perform during the second day of the qualifications and eventually finished in 38th place.

== Routine music information ==
Year	Apparatus	Music Title
2026	Hoop	Mad World by 2WEI, Tommee Profitt and Fleurie
2026	Ball	Old Money by Lana Del Rey
2026	Clubs	
2026	Ribbon	I'm So Excited by Sound Of Legend
2025	Hoop	Succession by Brand X Music
2025	Ball	(Where Do I Begin) Love Story by Shirley Bassey
2025	Clubs	El Cumbanchero by Lucie Arnaz
2025	Ribbon	I'm So Excited by Sound Of Legend
2024	Hoop	Succession by Brand X Music
2024	Ball	
2024	Clubs	
2024	Ribbon	I'm So Excited by Sound Of Legend
