= Fitkid =

European children's exercise sport

Fitkid (also FitKid, Fit Kid or Fit-Kid) is a type of children's sport combining gymnastics, dance and acrobatics. It originated in Spain in the 1990s, and is meant to engage children 8–18 years of age in fun individual and group exercise, free of the extremes of more strenuous aerobics or traditional gymnastics. International competitions are organized regularly by the International FitKid Division, in addition to national competitions. A routine stands of four types of elements: strength, flexibility, acrobatics, and jumps. All elements are graded by difficulty from A to H. A elements being worth 0.1 points, B 0.2, C 0.3, and so on until H which is worth 0.8. Routines get evaluated in three categories: technique, artistry, and content (execution of elements). Competition is divided by age groups (I. to IX. (or Senior in A category)), and categories ( which are based on knowledge). There three categories (from hardest to easiest) A, B, and C, also called Dance. In each categories there are group and individual routines. In C Category (here group routines are also called Dance Show) team member can go from 4 to 8. In A and B category there are duos, small groups (3–4), and big groups (5–6). In C category, individually 4 elements have to be performed ( one from each type), A or B difficulty, and in groups, two are optional. In B category individually 8 elements need to be performed ( two from each type) A-D difficulty ( but max. two elements can be D), and in groups 4 (same as C category individual). In A category team and individual, 8 elements need to be performed (same as B category) and an acrobatic connection is optional. Skills in A category can be any difficulty.
