= Magglingen Protocols =

Report on abuse of athletes in the Swiss Gymnastics Federation

The Magglingen Protocols were a report about the abuse of Swiss gymnasts at the National Sports Centre in Magglingen. It was based on the reports of over a dozen female artistic and rhythmic gymnasts who trained there between 2005 and 2020, eight of whom gave permission to be quoted by name. The report was released to the public at the end of October 2020.

== Incidents and assessment ==
The athletes reported systematic intimidation, humiliation, excessive weight control, and psychological and physical abuse. Some of them developed eating disorders, post-traumatic stress disorder, and suicidal thoughts, and some athletes experienced lasting physical consequences from training on injuries. Sports psychologist Hanspeter Gubelmann analyzed these incidents as "psychological and/or physically" harmful and as "a power play by a completely incompetent, narcissistic trainer" rather than training. He described the manipulation of the athletes as gaslighting.

== Consequences and impact ==
=== Consequences ===
The managing director of the Swiss Gymnastics Federation, Ruedi Hediger, announced his resignation in November 2020. The Berner Zeitung reported on the "systematic failure of the Swiss Gymnastics Federation over the previous two decades".

Trainer Fabien Martin, who had been in charge of the sports center since 2017, his wife Natalia Michailowa, and his brother, who had been hired at his request, were questioned about the allegations in July 2021 and fired in September 2021. The investigation cited violations of the Charter for Ethics in Swiss Sport and recommended dismissal. The Neue Zürcher Zeitung criticized the investigation as being one-sided.

Swiss politicians reacted to the report with demands for a contact and reporting center for abuse in sport. This reporting center was established at the beginning of 2022. According to Ernst König, the director of the organization Swiss Sport Integrity, which is affiliated with the center, by mid-2022, the center was receiving six to seven reports a week from athletes in a variety of sports. In 2024, it received over 400 reports, and it opened investigations in 91 cases.

The national rhythmic gymnastics training group at the Sports Centre in Magglingen was dissolved in 2021. This meant that athletes no longer had access to the center's sprung floor (which had sometimes been dismantled) to train on, and gymnasts such as Livia Maria Chiariello began to experience injuries such as repeated stress fractures in their feet that were linked to training on hard floors.

=== Further investigations ===
The Swiss Gymnastics Federation commissioned an independent report on the treatment of rhythmic gymnasts, and the findings were released in late January 2021. Nearly three hundred retired and current gymnasts were contacted for the report. More than 90 percent of gymnasts reported being yelled at regularly, more than half reported being insulted and having comments made about their appearance, and more than a quarter reported physical abuse.

The independent report also criticized failures in leadership and sports medicine. It found that while international gymnasts reached their peak performance at the age of 21, only four Swiss gymnasts in the previous decade had continued training until that age, with 85 percent quitting by age 18. One doctor listed as a physician for the national team claimed to have not acted in that role, and the gymnasts had not been offered medical services from the Federal Office of Sport since 2019. The report made a number of recommendations, such as improving the training of coaches, and the Swiss Gymnastics Federation said it would attempt to implement them.

An external investigation on the allegations in both rhythmic and artistic gymnastics was launched by the Federal Office of Sport, which released its findings in October 2021. The investigation corroborated the reports of abuse at the National Sports Centre, and the Sports Minister Viola Amherd announced measures to counteract abuse in sports.

=== Other reactions ===
In 2025, Marion Rothaar, a German former rhythmic gymnast who now lives in Switzerland, produced a play based on the Magglingen Protocols.

== See also ==
- USA Gymnastics sex abuse scandal
- Whyte Review
