= Whyte Review =

Review into the practices of British Gymnastics

The Whyte Review was a review into the practices of British Gymnastics. The review was co-commissioned by UK Sport and Sport England and led by Anne Whyte KC.

== Review findings ==
The report began in August 2020 in response to public allegations of abuse by gymnasts. The review received in excess of 400 submissions of evidence and cost £3 million. 190 interviews were conducted for the report and 133 former and current gymnasts were interviewed. It was published in June 2022.

The review detailed 'systemic' accounts of both physical and emotional abuse of young athletes. The submissions described sexual assault, excessive weigh management and emotional abuse of gymnasts. Over 40% of the submissions reported physical abuse, including training on injuries, overstretching, and withholding food or water, and more than 50% described emotionally abusive language such as insults and swearing.

UK Sport and Sport England said that while they would continue to fund British Gymnastics, they would require them to make significant changes recommended by the review to receive funding in the future.

== Impact and consequences ==
In response, British Gymnastics released a list of planned organizational changes in October 2022, such as listing banned coaches on their website, hiring an independent advisor, and including parents and gymnasts in more decisions. As part of their plan, they doubled spending on athlete welfare and safety. Restrictions were put in place on when gymnasts could be weighed and coaches were banned from weighing gymnasts, something that gymnasts said had been used as a form of punishment.

An activist group for gymnasts, Gymnasts for Change, criticized British Gymnasts in June 2023 for moving too slowly in making reforms and for not resolving cases brought against the organization. Becky Downie, one of the gymnasts who had spoken about abuse she experienced, agreed that more changes were needed but said that she had already seen positive effects on athletes from the reforms already implemented. Other gymnasts expressed disappointment, frustration, and a lack of trust in British Gymnastics and their ability to address abuse.

In November 2023, Anne White criticized the organization's complaints process, as cases went unresolved for years and few coaches were sanctioned by the process. She said that the process was likely to deter complaints rather than encourage people to make reports. No cases that had been heard due to the Whyte report resulted in coaches being banned. Gymnasts for Change called for the process to be halted altogether and claimed that it was biased in favor of coaches.

== See also ==
- USA Gymnastics sex abuse scandal
- Magglingen Protocols
