= Swiss Gymnastics Federation =

Swiss gymnastics organization

The Swiss Gymnastics Federation (French: Fédération Suisse de Gymnastique) is the governing body of gymnastics in Switzerland. Based in Aarau, it is a member of the Swiss Olympic Association.

Founded in 1985, by merging the Federal Gymnastics Society (founded 1832) and the Swiss Association for Women's Gymnastics (founded 1908), the Swiss Gymnastics Association claims to have 410,000 members. According to its website, it is Switzerland's oldest and largest sports association. Based in Aarau since 1832, it is responsible for the management of competitions (such as artistic gymnastics, rhythmic gymnastics, or trampoline) and also of leisure activities (such as aerobics or sports for youth and seniors).

In 2020, the organization faced accusations of abuse that were published in the Magglingen Protocols. This led to an independent report and external government investigation that corroborated the reports of physical and psychological abuse, as well as to calls for a reporting center for abuse in sports in Switzerland, which was established in 2022.
