= CircusTrix =

American recreation park company

- Type: Private
- Industry: Recreation
- Founded: 2011
- Founder: Case Lawrence
- Defunct: January 21, 2023
- Successor: Sky Zone
- Headquarters: Provo, Utah
- Number of locations: 300+
- Area served: Global
- Products: Trampoline parks
- Brands: Defy; Gravitopia; Planet3; Rockin' Jump; Ryze
- Website: Official Website

CircusTrix was an American developer, operator and franchisor of indoor trampoline and extreme recreation parks. The company operates over 319 parks in the United States, Europe, and Asia making it the largest trampoline park operator in the world, the largest operator of extreme obstacle courses in the United States, and the operator of the largest trampoline park in Germany.

The CircusTrix parks incorporate interconnected trampolines, soft foam pits, trapezes, slacklines, and American Ninja Warrior-inspired obstacle courses. In 2016, American Ninja Warrior competitor, Kevin Bull, signed an endorsement deal with the company. The company is based in Provo, Utah with additional offices in Los Angeles.

Brands that fell under the CircusTrix corporate umbrella include Sky Zone, Rockin’ Jump, Ryze, HighHeaven, Skywalk, 2Infinity, Gravitopia, and numerous others.

== History ==
CircusTrix was founded in October 2011 by Case Lawrence, a former attorney and real estate developer from Fresno, California. Lawrence got the idea for the company after visiting a trampoline park in San Francisco with his children. The first CircusTrix park, SkyWalk, was opened near Fresno in 2011. The second park, dubbed Defy Gravity, was opened in Durham, North Carolina in mid-2012. Over the next two years CircusTrix acquired, renovated and expanded other existing parks, increasing the number of locations to over 20 in 2014.

The company's exponential growth continued as they expanded the brand internationally by opening large, diverse parks in Europe and Asia under the Ryze brand name. In January 2014, CircusTrix announced that they would be expanding to the Asian market with a new trampoline park in Hong Kong. The park was opened in July 2014. The first European park was announced in September 2014 and was opened in January 2015 in Edinburgh, Scotland. By mid-2015, the company was operating 25 parks, most of which were in the United States. By the end of 2015, that number had increased to 28. Parks in South Korea, Hong Kong and Edinburgh opened between 2015 and 2016.

In 2016, new parks were opened or are planned to open in locations like Sacramento, California; Clovis; Seoul, South Korea; Lakeland, Florida; Visalia, California; and others. Many parks began introducing American Ninja Warrior-inspired obstacle courses, as well. In June 2016, CircusTrix announced that it had signed an endorsement deal with Kevin Bull, a frequent American Ninja Warrior competitor. As part of the deal, Bull trains in the company's parks and also appears in CircusTrix television and radio ads. As of August 2016, the company operates over 30 parks in the United States, Europe, and Asia.

By the end of 2016, CircusTrix had 40 parks throughout the world; by February 2019 the number had grown to 319 parks operating.

In January 2017, CircusTrix closed a round of private equity funding with Palladium Equity Partners for a fee estimated to be upwards of $200 million. According to The Wall Street Journal, the investment "represents the first significant move by private equity in the nascent indoor recreation sector." In March 2017, CircusTrix acquired trampoline park operator Rockin' Jump Holdings in a deal backed by Palladium Equity Partners.

In February 2018, CircusTrix acquired the Sky Zone chain of indoor trampoline parks and family entertainment centers. After completing the Sky Zone acquisition, CircusTrix had a total of 287 facilities and nearly 16,000 employees worldwide, which made it the biggest trampoline park operator in the world.

On August 22, 2018, CircusTrix celebrated the opening of their 300th park. The chain was recognized as Utah's second fastest-growing company in 2018 by Utah Business Magazine. CircusTrix was also ranked in the top 2,000 fastest-growing private companies on the Inc. 5000 list two years in a row.

On January 21, 2023, CircusTrix underwent a rebrand, sold off its European parks, and rebranded numerous parks to Sky Zone (parks located west of the Mississippi River) and DEFY (Parks located East of the Mississippi River).

== Parks ==
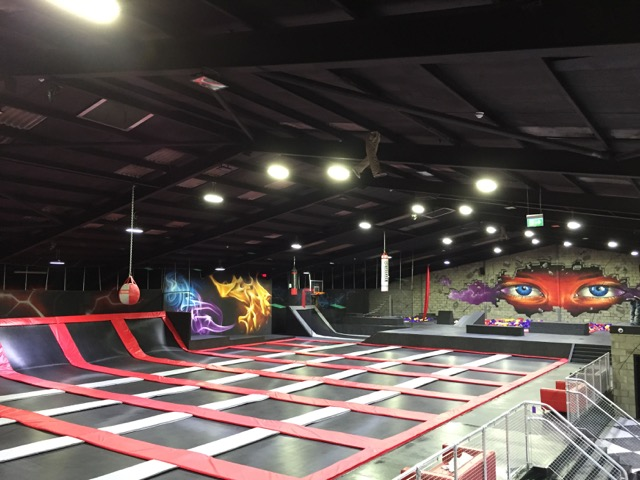
View of the main floor at CircusTrix's Ryze park in Edinburgh, Scotland.

At one point, CircusTrix operated over 319 indoor trampoline parks in North America, Europe, and Asia. Most parks consist of dozens of interconnected trampolines, American Ninja Warrior-style obstacle courses, soft foam pits, trapezes, and slacklines. Parks also contain special dodgeball and basketball courts along with aerial skills and parkour sections. Many parks also contain programs specifically for American Ninja Warrior training.

Parks in the United States operated under a variety of brand names including 2Infinity, Cloud9, Defy, Defy Gravity, Gravitopia, High Rise, HighHeaven, JumpJam, Jumpology, Planet3, Rockin' Jump, Ryze, Sky Zone, Skywalk, Superfly and others. High Rise Extreme Air Sports in Rogers, AR has been seen as a stand-out in the Greater Northwest Arkansas Region and a beacon of what CircusTrix aims to provide its guests. In Europe and Asia, most parks are branded as "Ryze."
