= Clearwater Water Park Development =

Construction company in California specializing in water based amusement parks

H2O Partners, LLC (dba Clearwater Water Park Development)
- Interactive map of H2O Partners, LLC (dba Clearwater Water Park Development)
- Location: Ladera Ranch, California
- Coordinates: 34.06929°N 117.22749°W
- Area: 20 acres (0.081 km^{2}) (0.65 km^{2})

Attractions
- Water rides: 20+
- Website: bigairfranchising.com

Clearwater Water Park Development is a family entertainment company based in Ladera Ranch, California. The company ran Wild Rivers water park in Irvine, California. The company currently owns and operates Big Air Trampoline Parks, a franchised trampoline park based in Ladera Ranch, California.

== Parks ==
- Wild Rivers (1986–2011)
- Splash Kingdom Waterpark (2012-2017)
- Big Air Trampoline Parks USA (2013–present)

== Purchase of Redlands Park ==
In 2011, Clearwater purchased Splash Kingdom Waterpark in Redlands. The company changed the name to Splash Kingdom Waterpark and added several attractions. It is the largest water park in the Inland Empire. In 2017, Clearwater sold the park to PS80 Partners.
