= Rockin' Jump =

Chain of trampoline parks in the United States

Rockin' Jump Trampoline Park
- Product type: Trampoline parks
- Current owner: Sky Zone
- Country: United States
- Introduced: 2010
- Related brands: Sky Zone, DEFY, RYZE
- Website: www.rockinjump.com

Rockin' Jump Trampoline Parks (or simply Rockin' Jump) is a chain of trampoline parks operated in the United States of America and owned by Sky Zone or by franchisees.

== History ==
The chain was launched by Drew Wilson and Marc Collopy in 2010 with the opening of a trampoline park in Dublin, California. The California park was announced in 2011 and opened a second facility in 2012.

== Parks ==
In 2021, Rockin' Jump had 41 locations located throughout the United States. Since then, most locations have either rebranded or permanently closed under the direction of Sky Zone.

As of 2026, the Concord, CA park is the only remaining location operating under the Rockin’ Jump brand.
