= Rebounder =

Rebounder may refer to:

- Rebounder (basketball)
- Rebounder, a type of trampoline
- Skull and crossbones.
