= Splash Kingdom Waterpark =

Former water park, trampoline park, and concert venue in Redlands, California

- Previously known as Pharaoh's Lost Kingdom
- Interactive map of Splash Kingdom Waterpark
- Location: Redlands, California
- Coordinates: 34.06929°N 117.22749°W
- Status: Defunct
- Opened: June 1996
- Closed: May 2019
- Theme: Egyptian
- Area: 20 acres (0.081 km^{2}) (0.65 km^{2})

Splash Kingdom Waterpark (formerly known as Pharaoh's Lost Kingdom) was a water park, trampoline park, minigolf course, arcade and concert venue located in Redlands, California. The 17-acre property was opened in 1996 by James Braswell, seeking to diversify from his family’s chain of senior care facilities. Attractions included an interior arcade, miniature golf, go-karts, bumper boats, laser tag, and water slides. The main building was topped by a pyramid and featured a giant pharaoh’s head looming over the entrance.

Over the years, many of the outdoor attractions closed during a series of ownership changes, code violations, and troubles with the city. It was renamed Splash Kingdom in 2006 as the focus shifted to the water park. The interior was transformed into a trampoline park in 2012. The owners, Dan Martinez, and Ryan Sauter, took over the property in 2017. They had the pharaoh’s head, most of the Egyptian decorations, and attractions such as the miniature golf removed in 2018. The city revoked their permit to operate but later restored it.

In May 2020, a massive fire on the property caused $750,000 in damages. After inspection, the park’s license to operate was revoked on October 13, 2020. Soon after on October 16, 2020 there was another fire, followed by a third in February 2021.

By 2021, the remaining buildings of Splash Kingdom were demolished. There is a preliminary application to build a warehouse on the property but city officials are considering rezoning the site for residential use to meet state housing requirements. A warehouse is currently under construction on the property.

== See also ==
- Clearwater Water Park Development
