= Lion Country Safari (California) =

Former zoo in Laguna Hills, California

Coordinates: 33°38′35″N 117°45′10″W

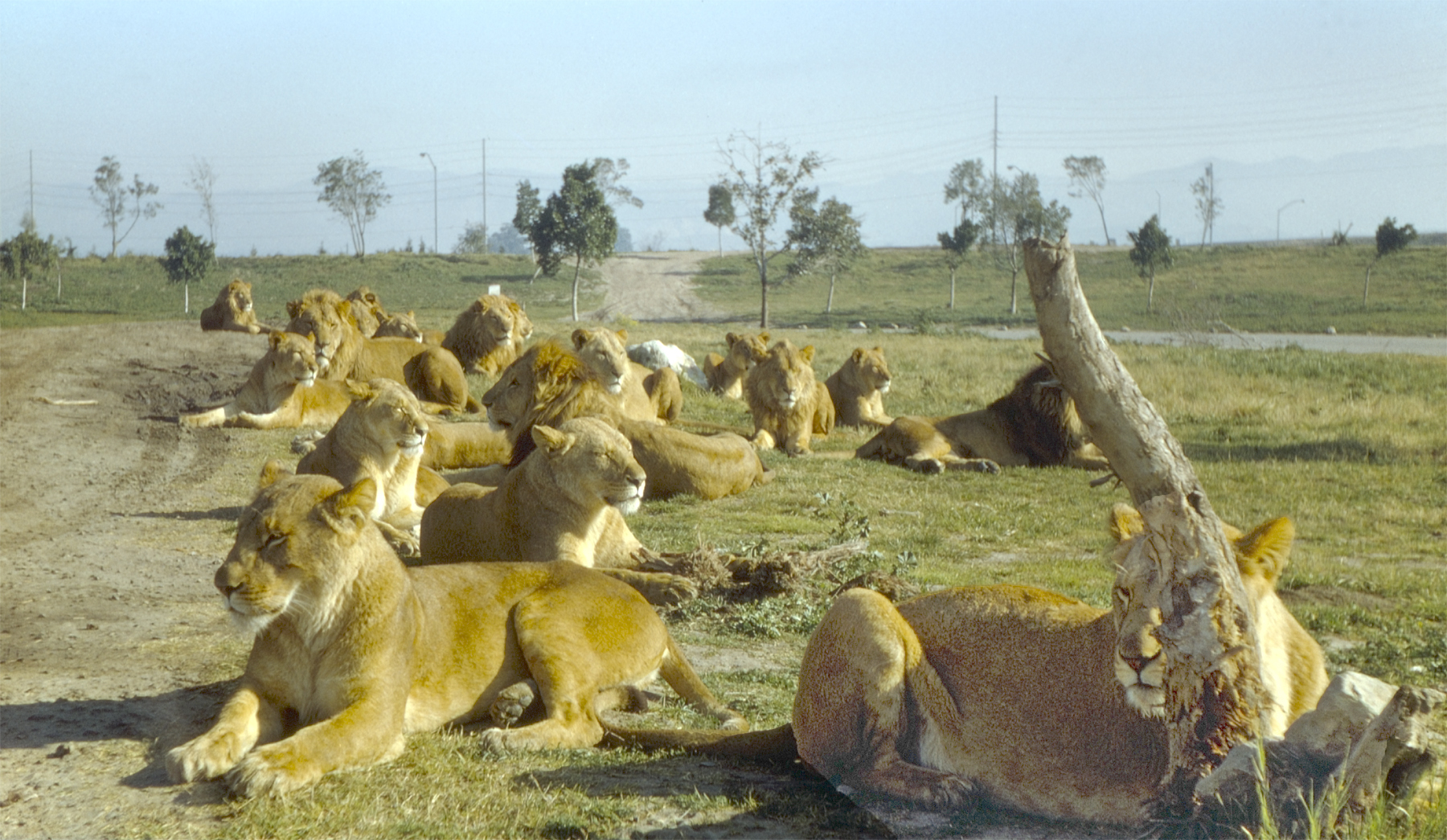
- Lions at Lion Country Safari in 1974
- Interactive map of Lion Country Safari
- Date opened: 1970
- Date closed: 1984
- Location: Laguna Hills, California
- Land area: 140 acres

Lion Country Safari was a drive-through safari park located outside Irvine, California, which opened in 1970. Allowing guests to drive their own vehicles through open enclosures, it was the first cageless safari park of its kind to open in southern California.

== History ==
Lion Country Safari was opened in 1970 by South African entrepreneur Harry Shuster. The park attained over 1 million visitors during its first year of operation.

=== Frasier the Sensuous Lion ===
Lion Country Safari's most famous resident was Frasier, an elderly lion that was given to the facility in 1970 from a circus in Mexico. Already 18 years old, the lion was toothless, ill, and arthritic. He became a major attraction at the park when, despite his advanced age, he fathered litters totaling 35 lion cubs by the park's pride of six lionesses. As a result, T-shirts, watches, and other souvenirs were made featuring a photo of Frasier, which quickly became popular merchandise.

Frasier died of pneumonia on July 13, 1972. He was buried at the park, with a sendoff by the Frasier clan of Scotland, which had adopted Frasier as its mascot. After his death, Lion Country Safari tried to capitalize on their star with a 1973 feature film called Frasier the Sensuous Lion. The film featured a song, by the same title, performed by Sarah Vaughan. However, the film was a major flop, financially and critically, being roundly panned for using a different lion in Frasier's place and for employing a voice actor for Frasier to fictionalize the story.

=== Later years and closure ===
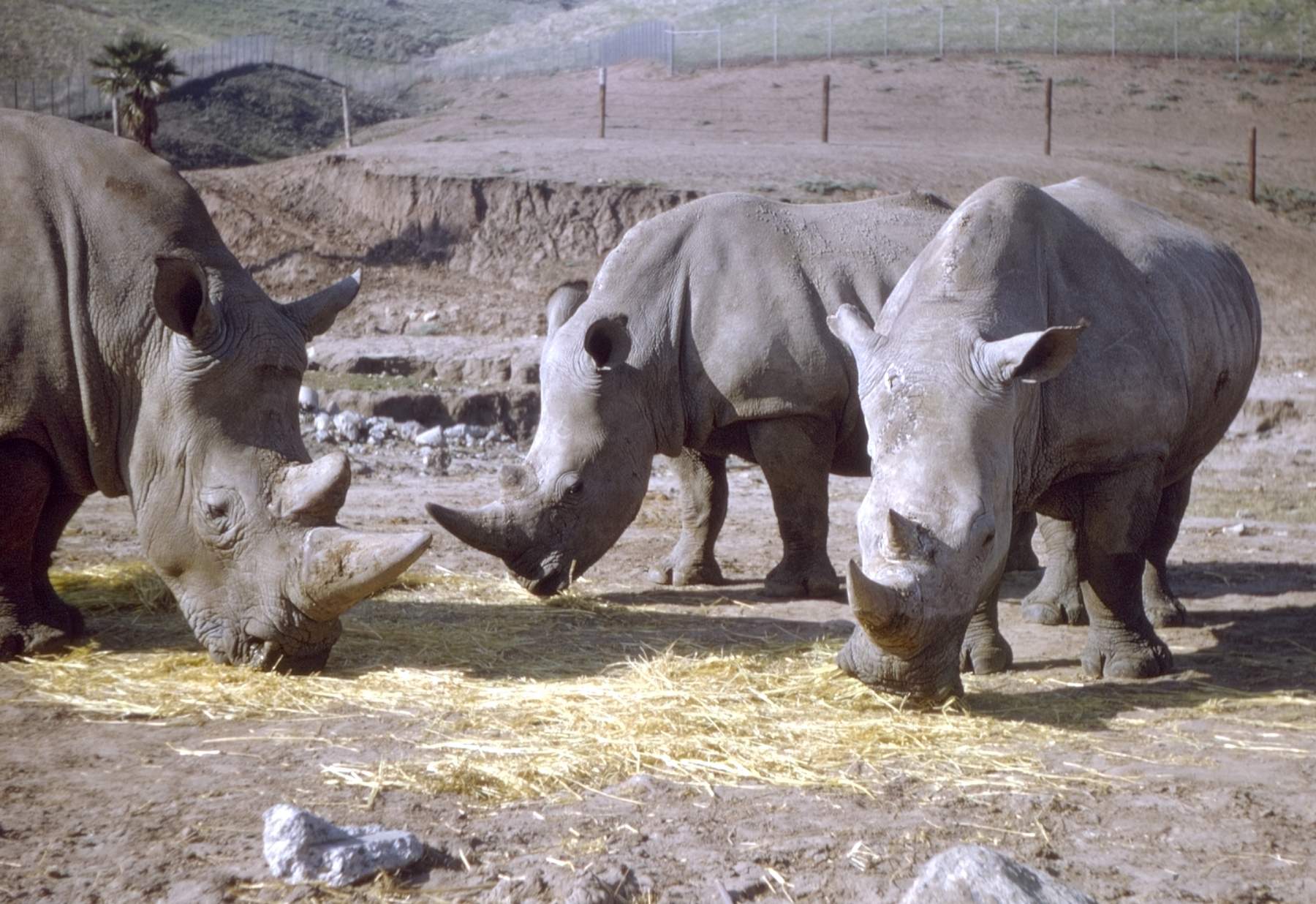
White rhinoceros

In 1978, a pregnant hippopotamus named Bubbles managed to escape three times in short succession. During the last of these escapes, Bubbles evaded capture for 19 days by hiding in a drainage ditch on the property. After numerous failed capture attempts, park rangers would attempt to tranquilize her. Bubbles collapsed in such a way that her internal organs crushed her lungs, and she suffocated to death.

On October 23, 1982, a two-year-old boy named Anthony Stopani was mauled by an escaped Siberian tiger. Stopani was ultimately paralyzed by the event, and the park had to pay at least 1.5 million dollars and possibly as much as two million in to settle the claim. In March 1983, a chimpanzee attacked one of the park's zookeepers. Later that year, an Asian elephant named Misty escaped, killing park warden Lee Keaton and causing a traffic jam on Interstate 405 before being recaptured.

The park perpetually suffered from low attendance after Frasier's death, which was compounded by negative publicity surrounding animal escapes and insurance claims from visitors injured by the animals. Lion Country Safari closed in 1984, with the owner still holding 13 years of the original 29-year lease, which he then subleased to the operators of the Wild Rivers water park, the Camp Frasier (later Camp James) summer camp and the Irvine Meadows Amphitheatre. The water park and summer camp closed in 2011, with the land turned into a housing development. The same fate befell the amphitheatre in 2016, such that the original Irvine-based Lion Country Safari land is now a 3,700-unit housing development. A bronze historical marker commemorates the former site of Lion Country Safari.

== Attractions ==
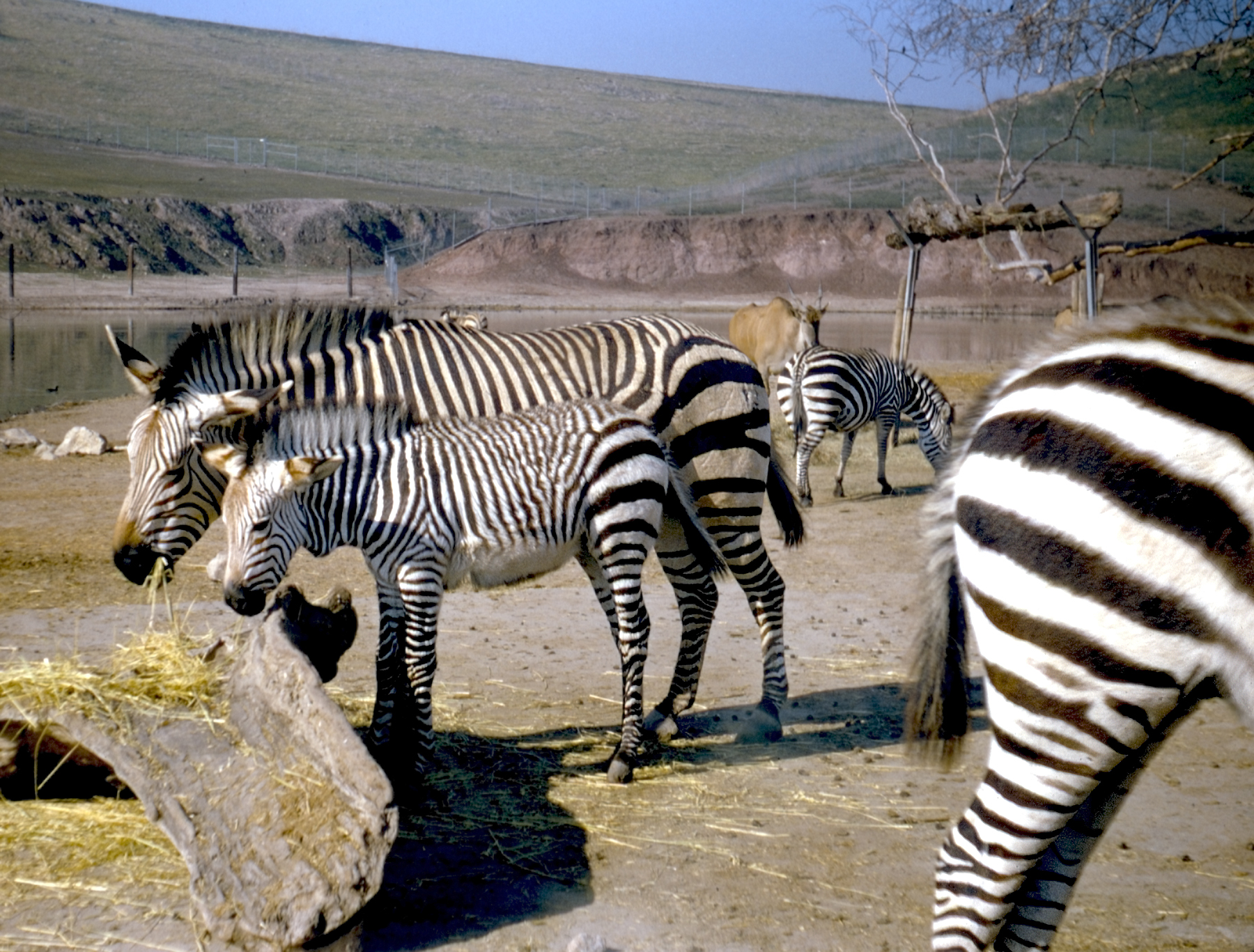
Zebras at Lion Country Safari in 1974

The park's main attraction was a four-mile drive through open enclosures containing primarily African wildlife. These included lions, tigers, African and Asian elephants, hippopotamus, giraffes, Dromedary camels, white rhinoceroses, and ostriches.

After the drive, guests could explore a "safari camp" with rides, a petting zoo, a bird show, and replicas of African villages. Rides included African Express Train, Hippo Pedal Boats, a boat ride that passed by live animals, and a children's treehouse. A cheetah captive breeding program operated on a more distant part of the property.
