= Wild Rivers (water park) =

Water park in Irvine, California, US

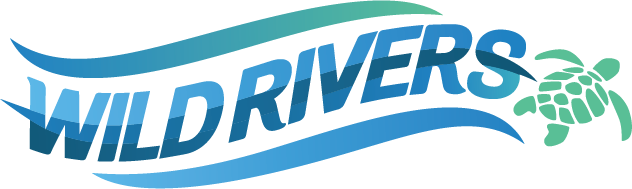

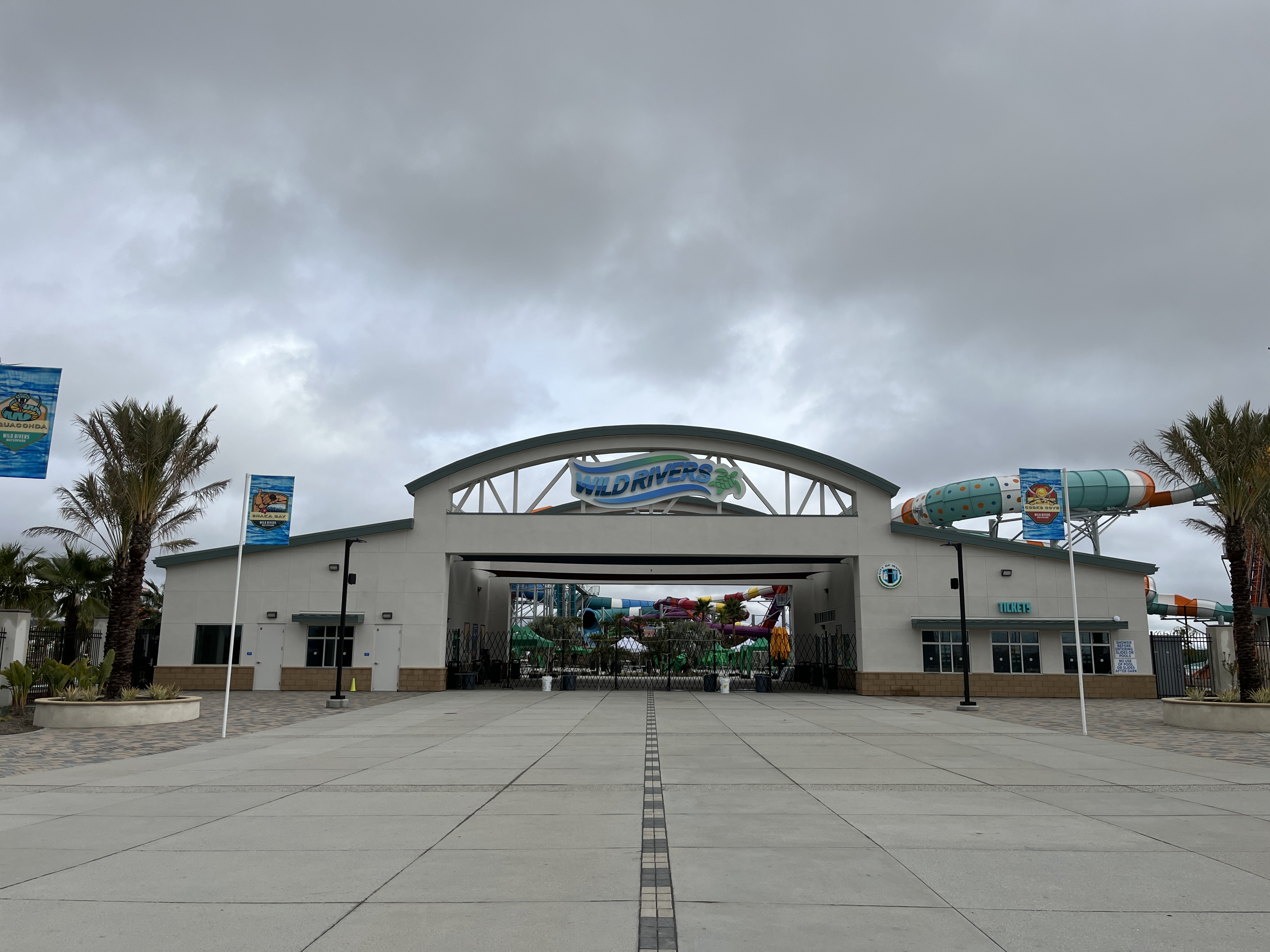
- Entrance at the Orange County Great Park (March 2023)
- Interactive map of Wild Rivers
- Slogan: Go Wild!
- Location: 10000 Great Park Blvd, Irvine, California 92618
- Coordinates: 33°40′00″N 117°44′00″W
- General manager: Steve Mayer
- Opened: July 10, 2022
- Operating season: May through October
- Area: 20 acres (8.1 ha)
- Pools: 7 pools
- Water slides: 20 water slides
- Website: www.wildrivers.com

Wild Rivers (old)
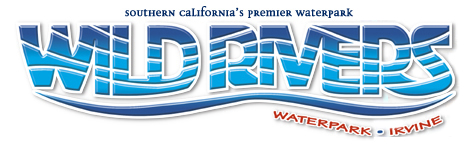
- Old Logo for Wild Rivers Waterpark

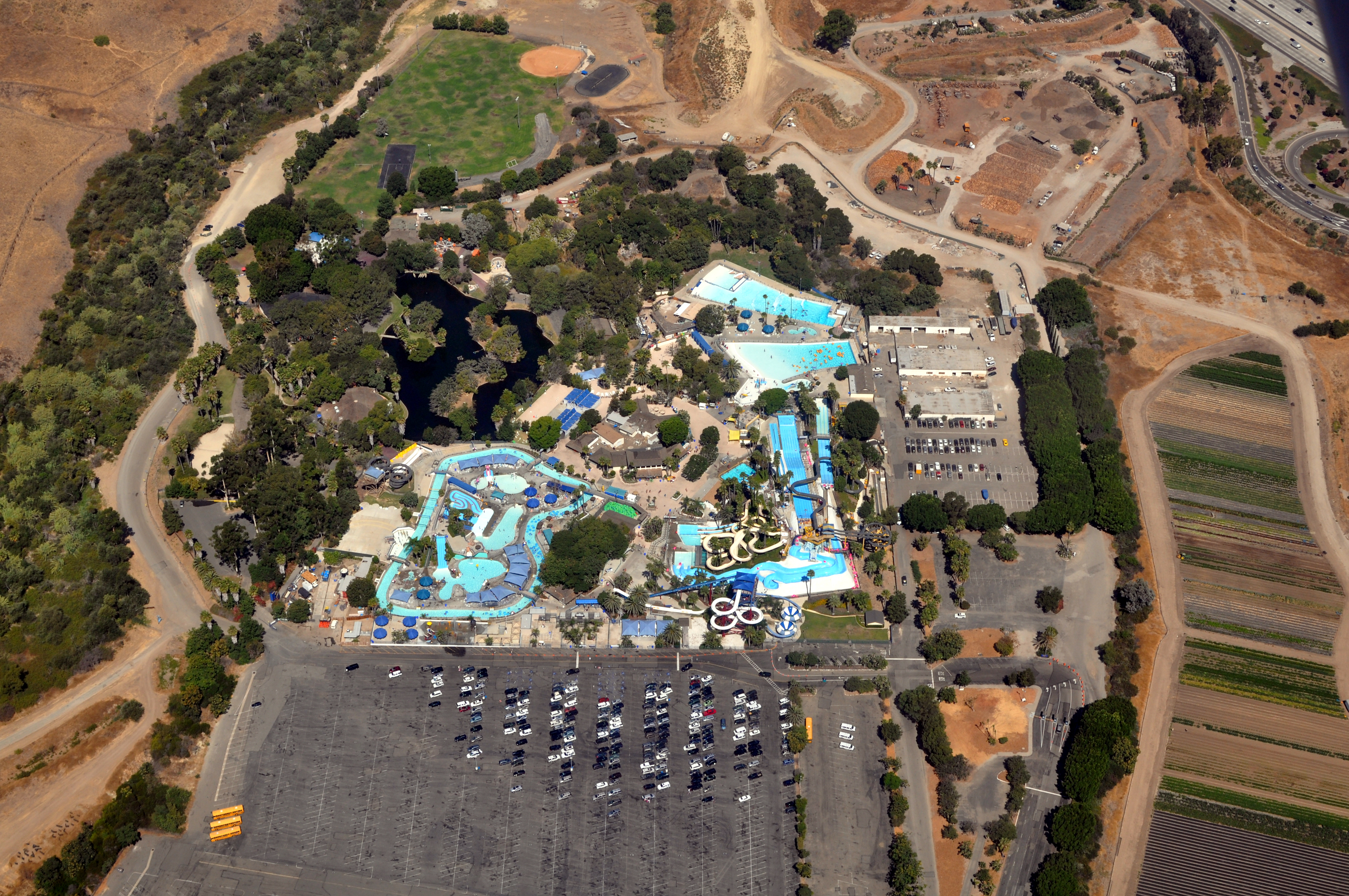
- Wild Rivers Water Park in 2010
- Interactive map of Wild Rivers (old)
- Slogan: Go Wild!
- Location: 8770 Irvine Center Dr, Irvine, CA 92618
- General manager: Kevin Kopeny
- Opened: July 1986
- Closed: September 25, 2011
- Operating season: May through October
- Status: Defunct[[]]
- Area: 20 acres (8.1 ha)
- Pools: 10 pools
- Water slides: 20 water slides
- Website: wildrivers.com

Wild Rivers is a water park in Irvine, California, United States. It originally opened in July 1986 on the site of the former Lion Country Safari.. Following a closure in 2011, it reopened in 2022 at its modern site, 50% larger.

== History ==
=== 1970-1984: Lion Country Safari ===
Before Wild Rivers was built, the land was a drive-through zoo called Lion Country Safari, which went bankrupt and closed in 1984.

=== 1985-2011: Wild Rivers water park on Lion Country Safari site ===
The owner of Lion Country Safari still held 13 years on the original 29-year lease for the land, which he then subleased to the operators of the Wild Rivers water park, the Camp Frasier (later Camp James) summer camp and the Verizon Wireless Amphitheatre.

Construction on Wild Rivers "Mountain Top" which would serve as the launch point for their largest rides, began in 1985 and the park itself opened in 1986. Congo River Rapids, Rattlesnake, and Python were the first large scale long form rides to open.

In early 2011, Wild Rivers announced that it had lost its lease with The Irvine Company. Both the park and the adjacent Camp James closed on September 25, 2011. The park was planned to be demolished with 1,750 apartments being built in its place. A new water park was planned to be built on public land near the Orange County Great Park, and was planned to open to the public in May 2014.

=== 2012-2021: Plans and delays for new water park ===
In August 2012, the Orange County Board of Supervisors approved plans to rebuild Wild Rivers near the Orange County Great Park.

The new Wild Rivers park was originally slated to open in May 2014, but it was then delayed a year later to May 2015 before it was cancelled altogether due to financial and land approval issues. In March 2016, the plans were revived and three months later, on June 26, 2016, the Great Park Board proposed two sites: one 35 acres and the other 60 acres. In late April 2017, Wild Rivers successfully negotiated a contract with the Irvine City Council, acting as the Orange County Great Park, paving the way for their return to Irvine as soon as summer 2019. As of March 2018, the park was planning on opening in a 26-acre (11 ha) site on the former Marine Corps Air Station El Toro at the eastern corner of Marine Way and Skyhawk, but were waiting on environmental studies and approval from the US Navy. In August 2018, Wild Rivers announced that the park would not open until 2020 at the earliest, and as of April 2019 they had not finalized the lease terms and environmental study, and their exclusive agreement to negotiate with the city had expired. In January 2020, the city reached a tentative agreement with Wild Rivers for a new 20-acre (8.1 ha) location within Great Park at the southern corner of Great Park Boulevard and Skyhawk, and the lease was approved in April. In July 2020, the park submitted plans to the city for review, and was planning to open in May 2022.

=== 2021-2022: Construction of modern water park ===
Construction of the park began on July 1, 2021, after $60 million in financing was lined up, and 20 attractions were planned. Season passes for the 2022 season went on sale in November 2021.

=== 2022-present: Opening and operation of modern water park ===
The new Wild Rivers held a soft opening on July 10, 2022, followed by its official grand opening on July 29, 2022. The rebuilt park is approximately 50% larger than the original.

== Attractions ==
- Tortuga
- Typhoon
- Aquaconda
- Bora Bora Boomerango
- Tomcat Racers
- Tahitian Toucan
- Bombay Blasters
- Tala & Mano
- Fiji Falls
- Pelican Plunge
- Pipeline
- Samoan Serpent
- Tiki's Revenge
- Cook's Cove
- Kontiki Cove
- Castaway River
- Shaka Bay

== Originally planned, but cancelled attractions ==
- Paku'i Reef
- The Tsuanmi
- El Toro Lagoon

== See also ==
- List of water parks
- Clearwater Water Park Development
