= Sky Zone =

Operator of indoor active entertainment parks

Sky Zone LLC
- Type: Private company
- Industry: Entertainment
- Founded: 2004; 22 years ago
- Founder: Rick Platt and Jeff Platt
- Headquarters: Dallas, Texas, U.S.
- Number of locations: 300
- Key people: David Hoffmann (CEO)
- Products: Indoor Active Entertainment Parks
- Brands: Defy; Gravitopia; Planet3; Rockin' Jump; Ryze
- Services: Trampolines; Ninja warrior courses; Zip lines; Climbing walls; Obstacle courses; Foam pit
- Owner: Palladium Equity Partners
- Website: www.skyzone.com

Sky Zone is an indoor trampoline park operator company based in Dallas, Texas, often credited with opening the first indoor trampoline park in 2004. SkyZone has been the location of lawsuits, criticism, recurring injuries, and multiple over-100-person brawls.

== History ==
Sky Zone was founded in 2004 by entrepreneur Rick Platt in the Las Vegas Valley, with the hope that the trampoline courts to be used as part of a new sport with professional athletes. Platt spent US$2 million to build a 17,000 square foot (1,600 m^{2}) trampoline arena in Las Vegas and to hire athletes for the sport, which would have included rotating hoops and mid-air acrobatics. The sport failed to generate interest at the time, but local skateboarders learned of the facility and wanted to bounce on the court, which led to Platt charging admission. Within six months, the facility had hosted 10,000 visitors.

In 2006, Platt's son Jeff, who was a student at Washington University in St. Louis, opened a similar park in Missouri.

In 2011, Sky Zone organized Ultimate Dodgeball, an extreme dodgeball competition played inside Sky Zone trampoline parks. The competition ran from that year to 2018, with championships featured on ESPN until the competition was closed.

In 2012, Sky Zone became one of the founding members of the International Association of Trampoline Parks.

In 2013, Sky Zone announced a master franchise license with Strike Bowling Bar to build 10 parks in Australia as well as future parks in New Zealand. In May 2014, the company's Sky Zone Australia subsidiary began opening locations across Australia. In 2016, it was reported that the owner of Sky Zone Australia, Funlab, was putting up the Australian operation for sale. Funlab was also selling its Strike Bowling business.

Also in 2016, trade publication Franchise Times ranked Sky Zone as No. 2 on the list of fastest growing franchises.

In May 2017, the company announced the world's largest trampoline park was being built in Hyderabad, India. In August, the company opened Sky Zone Hyderabad, the first trampoline park in India. In December, the company opened a park in Cecil Township, Pennsylvania that included the company's first American Ninja Warrior-style obstacle course.

By 2018, Sky Zone had over 200 locations. In February, American park operator CircusTrix, backed by private equity firm Palladium Equity Partners, announced that it had acquired Sky Zone. In November, the company was featured in an episode of the American television program Undercover Boss.

In 2019, the company reported 30 million annual visitors, and $380 million in revenue. In November, the company announced a partnership with Carnival Cruise Lines, to put a Sky Zone trampoline park on the Carnival Panorama cruise ship.

By November 2021, the company had more than 150 trampoline parks around the world.

In 2025, Sky Zone rebranded their identity, with the new logo appearing in a location in Chicago.

== Attractions ==
Typical Sky Zone Indoor Trampoline Parks consist of several trampoline courts, which have trampolines for floors and walls. Some Sky Zone parks include non-trampolining activities such as climbing, ninja warrior courses, slides, zip lines, toddler zones, challenge courses, and stunt bags.

Larger courts allow for many visitors to bounce and jump simultaneously, while smaller courts are used for games of baseball and basketball, where players can bounce around to avoid being hit by other players' throws. Some courts allow visitors to bounce into a pit filled with foam blocks, and others feature basketball goals placed above trampolines, permitting visitors to bounce and slam dunk balls into the goals. Some centers have started exercise classes using the trampoline courts.

== Injuries and lawsuits ==
Sky Zone has been the subject of individual and class-action lawsuits due to injuries that have occurred in its trampoline parks. According to research from the Children's Hospital Colorado, presented through the American Academy of Pediatrics, the likelihood of sustaining a trampoline injury was 32% greater at a trampoline park than at home.

To warn customers of injuries and discourage risky behavior, the company requires customers to watch a safety video, and sign waivers acknowledging the inherent danger of trampolining. The company also trains its employees to separate customers by size, but investigative reports suggest that those guidelines are not always followed. The waivers also require injuries to be addressed by arbitration.

In 2017, a three-year-old suffered a broken bone at a "toddler time" jump activity offered by a Florida Sky Zone after an impact with a mat. Two years previously, the American Academy of Orthopedic Surgeons stated that children under six should not be allowed to use trampolines, due to safety concerns.

On September 12, 2020, an estimated 700 to 1000 people, mostly children, were trapped inside a Sky Zone park in Orland Park, Illinois during a large scale fight that included 200 children. The Sky Zone was shut down for safety violations, and reopened after going to court for an emergency order to stay in business. The park sued to retain its business license and in December 2021 was allowed to remain open after agreeing to implement additional security and other safety measures.

In November 2021, nearly 200 teenagers were involved in a brawl at a Sky Zone Trampoline Park in Tampa, Florida. The park closed, and was evacuated, but the fight moved outside into the parking lot. No arrests were made.

A news investigation revealed a pattern of recurring injuries at Sky Zone parks, including broken bones. These injuries, the investigation found, were caused by people getting their feet caught in the trampolines' metal frame or by being fallen on by others. A lawsuit connected to this investigation alleged dangerous design flaws, and pointed to internal Sky Zone worker manuals that warn about dangers with the pads, a warning reportedly not given to customers.

Adults have also been part of these patterns of injuries. Joba Chamberlain, former New York Yankees pitcher, suffered from extreme blood loss after breaking his ankle at a Sky Zone park in 2012.

== Operations ==
Sky Zone is headquartered in Dallas, Texas. The company operates franchises in the US, Canada, Mexico, Colombia, Guatemala, Kuwait, Saudi Arabia, and the United Arab Emirates. It is a subsidiary of park operator CircusTrix.
