= Bossaball =

Brazilian team ball sport

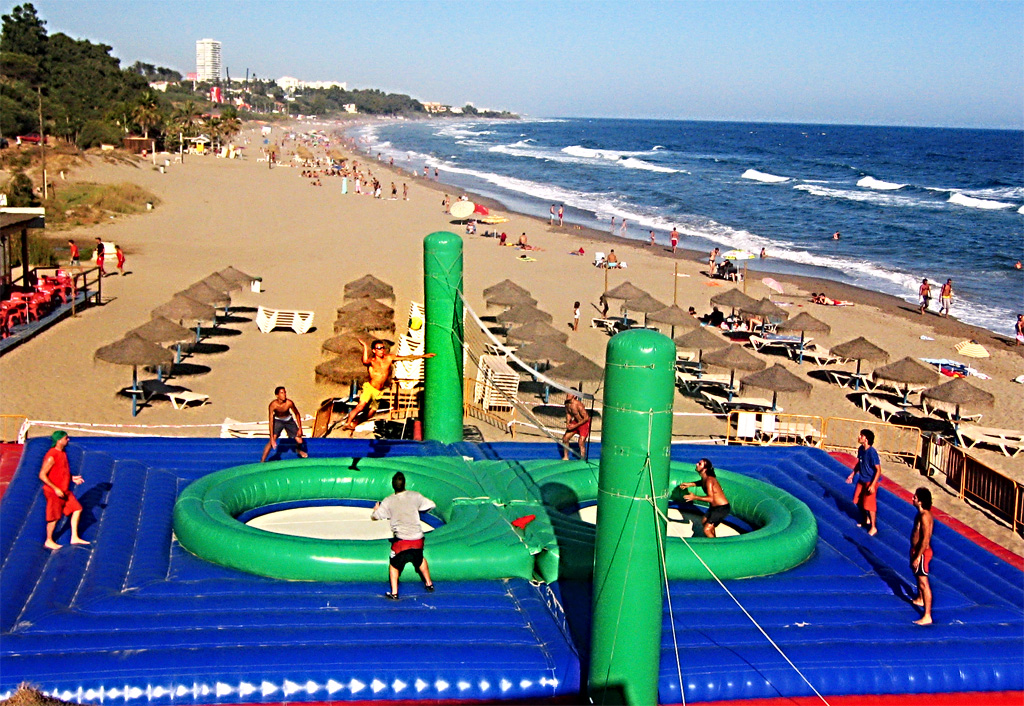
Bossaball match on the beach at Marbella

Bossaball is a team sport that originated in Brazil and was conceptualised by Filip Eyckmans in 2004. Bossaball is a ball game between two teams, combining elements of volleyball, football, and gymnastics with music into a sport. It is played on an inflatable court featuring a trampoline on each side of the net. The trampolines allow the players to bounce high enough to spike the ball over the net.

The word "bossa", which is sometimes translated as "style, flair or attitude", is commonly associated with Bossa Nova, a samba-influenced type of Brazilian music. The name Bossaball, therefore, expresses the aim to combine sports, music, and positive vibrations.

Some other countries where Bossaball has been introduced include: Brazil, Argentina, Mexico, Turkey, Belgium, Netherlands, Spain, Germany, France, Switzerland, Portugal, Greece, Austria, Italy, Slovenia, Hungary, Czech Republic, Romania, Israel, Egypt, Saudi Arabia, Qatar, Kuwait, Singapore, Chile, Colombia, Ecuador, Venezuela, and Paraguay.

== Rules ==
A Bossaball game is played between two teams of four players each. The aim is for each team to ground the ball on the opponent's field. The height of the net between both fields can be adjusted for different levels, such as professional, intermediate, beginner, or children. Players are not allowed to touch the net and always have to remain with at least one body part on their own side of the net.

One player (the attacker) is positioned on the trampoline, and the others are around him/her on the inflatables. A player from the serving team (the server) throws or kicks the ball into the air and attempts to hit the ball so it passes over the net on a course such that it will land in the opposing team's court (the serve). The opposing team must make a combination of no more than five contacts with the ball to return it to the other side of the net. These contacts can be exercised using any body part:

- Volley touch
  - Touching the ball one single time according to the traditional volleyball rules, with the lower arms, touch, spike or drop shot. Throwing the ball or guiding the ball for more than 1 second is not allowed.
- Football touch
  - Touching the ball up to two times (double football touch or a DST) with any body part except the hands or arms. For example, one can control the ball with the chest and then pass it with the head or foot. Any combination of body parts is allowed as long as none of the two contacts is with the hands or arms. A DST is counted as one pass.

Of the five maximum contacts, the ball has to be played at least once using the football touch technique, once the second pass has been played.

Touch 1	Touch 2	Touch 3	Touch 4	Touch 5	Allowed
Volley					YES
Football	Volley				YES
Volley	Volley	Volley			NO
Volley	Volley				YES
Volley	Volley	Volley	Football	Volley	YES
Football	Volley	Volley	Volley	Volley	YES
Volley	Football	Volley	Volley	Football	YES
Football	Football	Football			YES

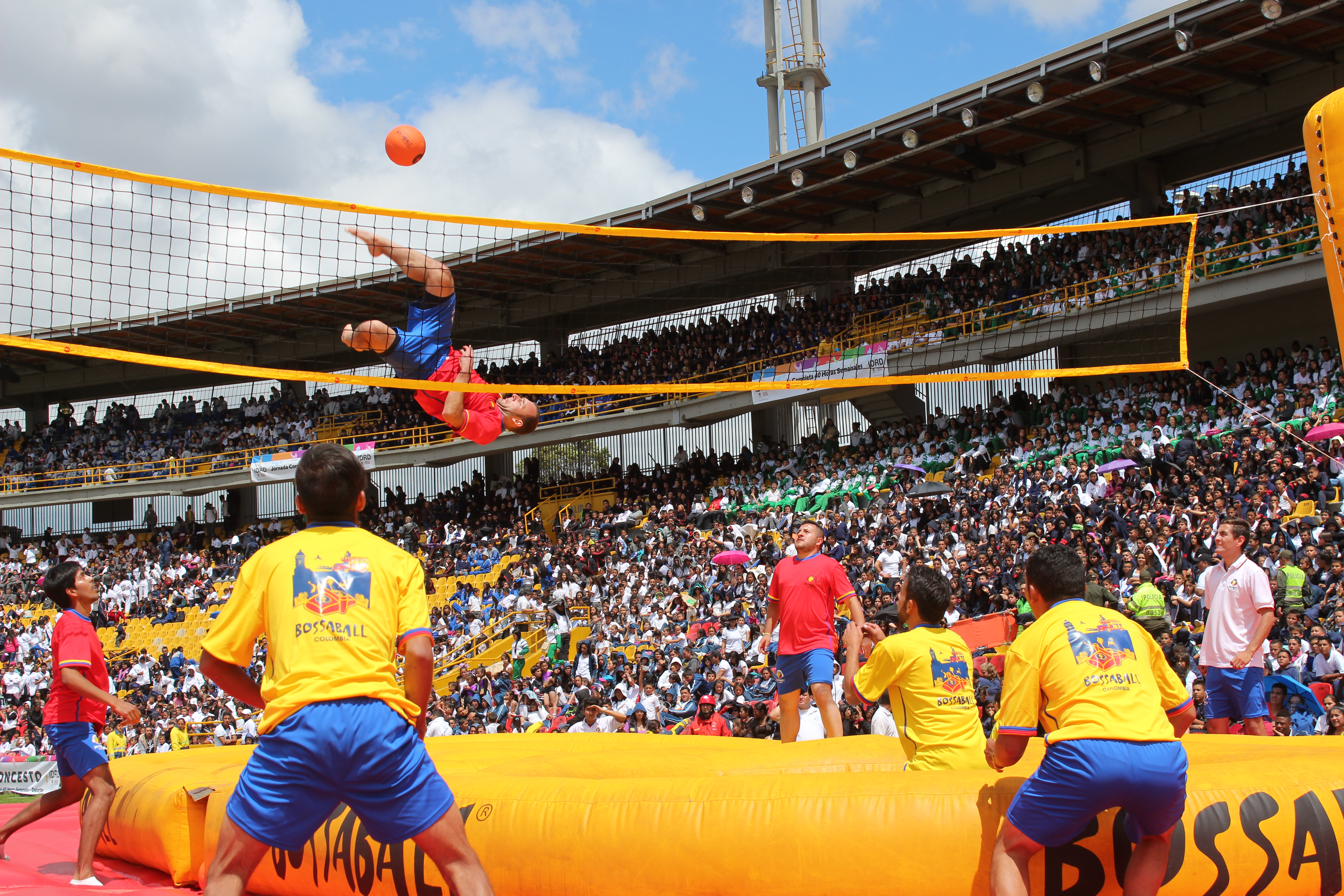
Attacker about to spike with the foot in order to gain extra points.

During a rally, the ball is tossed around while the attacker jumps on the trampoline in order to gain height. The attack begins when one of the rallying players aims the ball's trajectory towards a spot in the air where the attacker can hit it (spike or kick it) and return the ball over the net.

The team with possession of the ball that is trying to attack the ball as described is said to be on offense. The team on defence attempts to prevent the attacker from directing the ball into their court; the players at the net jump and reach above the top (and across the plane) of the net in order to block the attacked ball. If the ball is hit around, above, or through the block, the defensive players arranged in the rest of the court attempt to control the ball with a dig (usually a forearm pass of a hard-driven ball, or a foot control). After a successful dig, the team transitions to offense.

The game continues in this manner, rallying back and forth, until the ball touches the court within the scoring zones or a mistake is committed.

The role of a referee in Bossaball is similar to that in volleyball. Competition games are played with three referees: one primary and two assistants. The main referee stands under the net in the playing area. He or she is responsible for the final decisions and especially focuses on the net. The two assistant referees are positioned at opposite corners of the court. They have to keep track of the maximum number of touches (the soccer touch) and decide if the ball is in or out of bounds.

== Scoring ==
Points can be made either by scoring or by an opponent's error. When the ball touches the floor (the bottom of the trampoline or the inflatables) within the court boundaries (the outer safety zone is out), the team on the opposite side of the net is awarded a point. The safety border around the trampolines is a free zone. On this "bossawall", the ball may bounce or roll. When the ball lies still on the bossawall, the point goes to the opponent's team.

Scoring with volley touch:

- 1 point: when the ball hits the opponents playing area.
- 3 points: when the ball is played directly in the opponent's trampoline area.

Scoring with football touch (any part of the body except hands):

- 3 points: when the ball hits the opponents playing area.
- 5 points: when the ball is played directly in the opponent's trampoline area.

The team that scored, serves next point. The game continues, with the first team to score 25 points (and be two points ahead) awarded the set. Three sets are played in one match.

== Competition ==
An official match is the best of three sets. One set gets won when a team gains 25 points, with a minimum of two points difference to the opposing team. Sets continue after 25 points as long as there is no difference of two points. The third set is played to 15 points. The minimum of two points rule is also applied to this set.

Seven international championships have been carried out since 2005.

Year	Competition	Location	First place	Participating countries
2009	World Cup	Turkey	Brazil	Brazil, Belgium, Netherlands, Kuwait, Singapore
2010	European Cup	Netherlands	Belgium	Austria, Belgium, Czech Republic, Germany, Netherlands, Slovenia, Spain
2011	European Cup	Netherlands	Belgium	Austria, Belgium, Czech Republic, Germany, Netherlands, Slovenia, Spain
2012	European Cup	Czech Republic	Netherlands	Austria, Belgium, Czech Republic, Germany, Netherlands, Slovenia, Spain
2013	World Cup	Bonaire	Netherlands	Argentina, Belgium, Brazil, Germany, Netherlands
2014	European Cup	Netherlands	Netherlands	Belgium, Germany, Hungary, Italy, Netherlands, Spain
2015	World Cup "A decade in the air"	Spain	Belgium	Argentina, Belgium, Netherlands, Spain
2016	World Cup "#AtTheCopa"	Brazil	Netherlands	Argentina, Belgium, Brazil, Colombia, Netherlands

== Music and "Samba" referees ==
Music is a major component of a Bossaball show. The person overseeing the game is called the "samba referee" and does not only make calls but also serves as the Master of Ceremonies with the help of a whistle, a microphone, percussion instruments and a DJ set.
