= Rebound exercise =

Type of elastically leveraged exercise

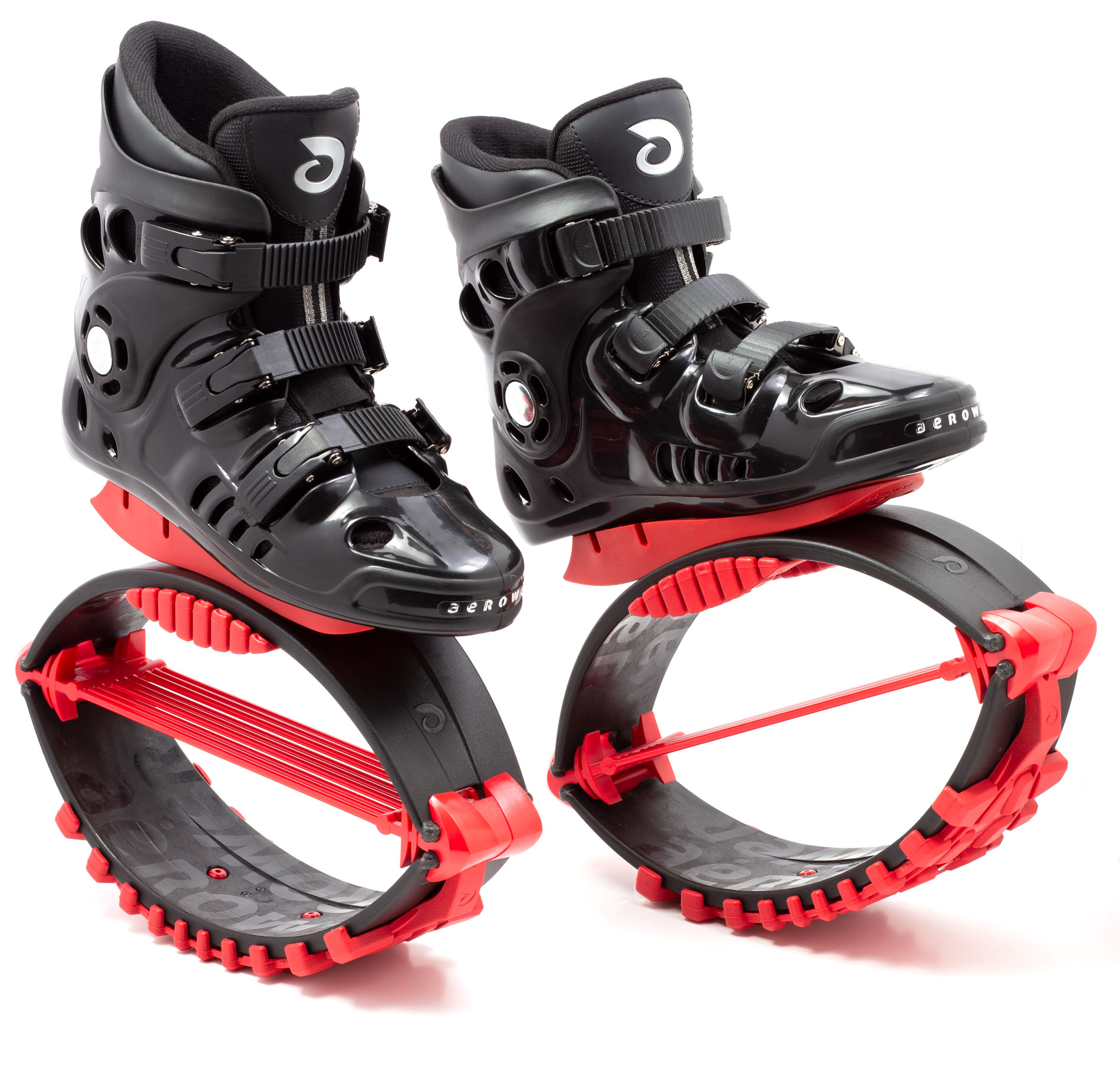
A pair of jumpers

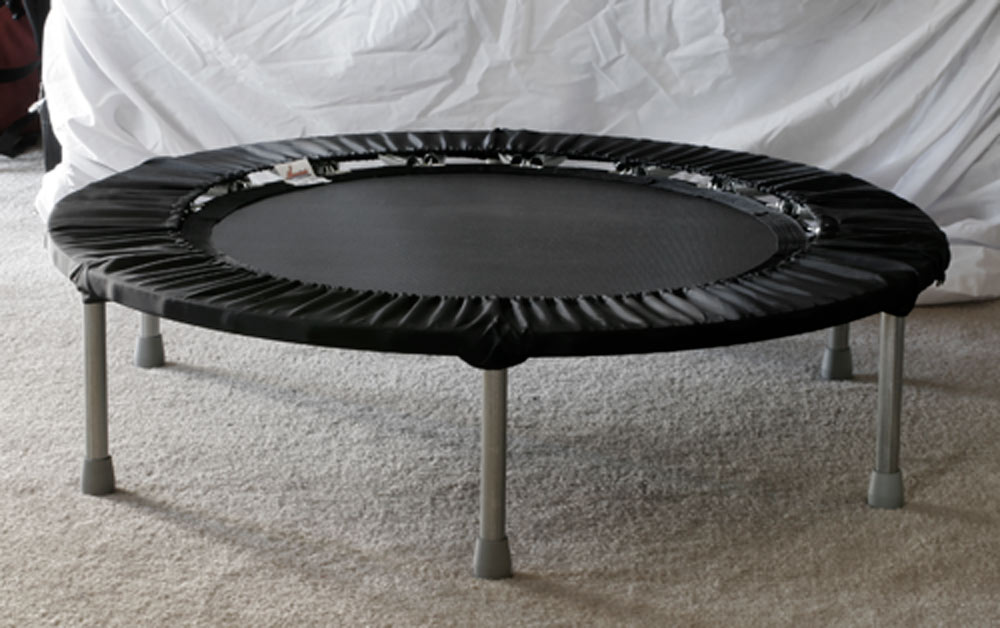
A mini-trampoline.

Rebound exercise (or "rebounding") is a type of elastically leveraged low-impact exercise usually performed on a device known as a rebounder—sometimes called a "mini-trampoline" or "fitness trampoline"—which is directly descended from regular sports or athletic trampolines.

Some of the basic movements and actions of rebound exercise include bouncing in place (sometimes also called "jumping" or the Health Bounce), jumping jacks, twists, side-to-side motions, running in place, dance movements, and a wide variety of other movements, patterned or un-patterned, with or without the use of hand-weights or other accessories. A wide variety of physical and other benefits are claimed for rebound exercise, which experienced a tremendous upsurge of interest in the mid-1980s. A rebound exercise program can focus on aerobics, strength, or just simple easy non-jarring movement, depending on the needs of the person bouncing.

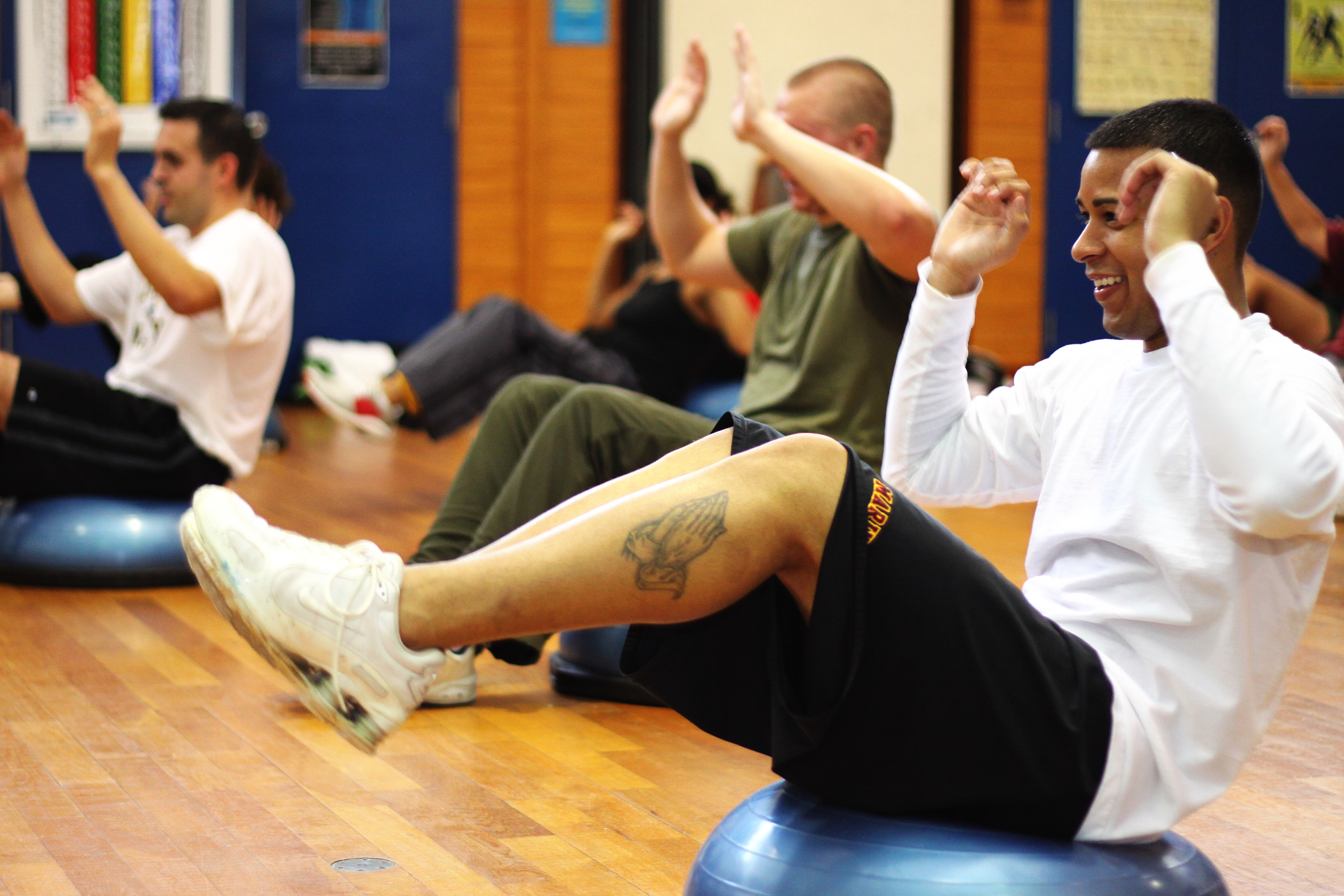
Bosu ball

Typically round, rebounders are much smaller (at about 3 to 4 feet in total diameter) than regular trampolines, and they are not designed for stunts. Other equipment for one or two feet, such as jumpers of Aerower and Kangoo Jumps or BOSU balls, can provide a type of rebound exercise experience, and regular, full-size, sports or athletic trampolines can also be used to perform the various movements, routines, programs, and styles that characterize rebound exercise. Rebounders are predominantly used solo in personal homes, but are also found in fitness studios, health clubs, and physical rehabilitation centers.

== History ==
The modern trampoline was created by George Nissen in Cedar Rapids, Iowa, in 1936. In 1938 the first "small trampoline" was created by Ed Russell, who left his ideas and prototype with Victor Green, who patented the "small trampoline" in 1975. Within a year, five American companies were manufacturing small trampolines, which were soon called rebounders.

In part because of business promotional efforts, and in part because of a number of scientific studies that seemed to support the value of rebounding, from 1981 to 1984 rebound exercise became very popular in the United States, with reportedly over one million units selling a year. The fad faded by the end of 1984, supposedly because poor quality foreign-made units had flooded the U.S. market.

Today, there appears to be an upsurge of interest in rebound exercise, in part due to increasing quality of equipment and in part due to its use in physical therapy and the fight against obesity generally. Rebound exercise is especially popular in holistic health circles, as rebounding is said to combat a number of ailments given its ability to generally and gently stimulate the immune system and provide aerobic exercise without jarring the physical structures of the body as the elastic element of the rebounder is said to take up to 85% of the shock that the body would otherwise experience.

== Equipment ==
Rebounders are often called "mini-trampolines" or "fitness trampolines", but this is a misnomer. Trampolines are generally much larger, and are designed to perform stunts such as flips and seat drops, while it is dangerous to perform stunts on rebounders. While there are "double mini-trampolines" used in sports and even Olympic competition, these are designed specifically to perform stunts and are used in a substantially different manner than is the typical rebounder.

Most but not all rebounders are round, and consist of the following parts:

- 6 legs between 8 and 14" long
- a durable mat with an elastic nature
- an elastic element such as spring or bungee bands
- a round elevated rim which the legs support and which is attached to the mat by the elastic element, either springs or bungee bands

Since their introduction, many improvements have been made to the quality and construction of rebounders. Spring size, shape, and durability have improved greatly over time, and in the last several years springs have been replaced entirely in certain high-end units by bungee-bands, which are quieter and may also offer certain advantages in terms of smoothness and user experience. Units with folding legs, and units whose entire body (including the mat and the rim) folds in half, or even in quarters, have been introduced. Rebounders can be purchased for anywhere from between $40 and $1,000 and up.

The largest two differences between rebounders, other than manufacturing materials, relate to the source of elasticity and to stability. As this mechanism is responsible for carrying the weight of the user, their longevity and responsiveness directly affect the rebounding experience. Elastic cords (also called "bungee cords") and piano wire springs are the main options for elasticity. Historically, rebounders have had straight legs, but newer high-end rebounders use arched legs that go beyond the diameter of the frame, preventing rebounders from tipping.

== Types of exercise and movements performed ==
Rebound exercise begins as soon as someone steps on a rebounder and begins to move their body. It can be highly aerobic full-on sprints and interval training are ideal on a rebounder, because it does not jar the body anywhere near as much as does hard ground—or it can be very slow and gentle, with only a gentle rocking taking place.

Just as rebounders have evolved from poorly made spring-based units to modern spring-based units and high-end bungee-based units, the types of exercise and movement done on rebounders has evolved as well.

Al Carter initially introduced the distinction between the "health bounce" (a gentle rocking motion that anyone in any state of health can do, which was said to stimulate the immune system), an "aerobic bounce" that involved elevating the heart rate (either running in place or dancing), and the "strength bounce", which involved higher bouncing with both feet leaving the mat (leading to both abdominal and lower body strength directly as well as to the strengthening of all bodily cells through the accelerative force applied (see Claimed Benefits below).

Subsequently, many different approaches have been taken to rebounding. For example, collaborating with Al Carter and working with athletes in the late 1970s and 1980s, Dr. Harry Sneider, a college athletic coach, brought his sport-specific training methods and the use of resistive hand-weights to rebound exercise. More recently, JB Burns has pioneered an infomercial and mass equipment approach making use of dance-style workout DVDs for home users. Along the way, a variety of celebrities have endorsed rebounding, including the fitness guru Jack LaLane and the self-help guru Tony Robbins. Bob Hope reportedly said, "I keep my REBOUNDER at the foot of my bed, and use it daily", and President Ronald Reagan reportedly said, "If you see somebody jumping up and down on the second floor of the White House, that's me rebounding."

== American Council on Exercise Study ==
In October 2016, the American Council on Exercise (ACE) — the leading nonprofit organization certifying health coaches and exercise professionals — sponsored a study on rebounders. In the article "Putting Mini-trampolines to the Test" they write, "ACE enlisted the help of John Porcari, Ph.D., and his team of researchers in the Department of Exercise and Sport Science at the University of Wisconsin–La Crosse."

In summary, it was proven that 20 mins of doing a rebounder workout (the one included in the JumpSport rebounder box) burned the same number of calories as 30 min of jogging. Also, participants felt the exercise was 10% less strenuous than expected.

== NASA study and scientific support generally ==
The most frequently quoted scientific research study on trampolining was conducted in 1980 through NASA by A. Bhattacharya, E.P. McCutcheon, E.Shvartz, and J.E. Greenleaf; Biomechanical Research Division, NASA-Ames Research Center, Moffett Field, California, in cooperation with the Wenner-Gren Research laboratory, University of Kentucky, Lexington, Kentucky. The key findings for this study include the following:

- ".. . for similar levels of heart rate and oxygen consumption, the magnitude of the bio mechanical stimuli is greater with jumping on a trampoline than with running, a finding that might help identify acceleration parameters needed for the design of remedial procedures to avert deconditioning in persons exposed to weightlessness."
- "The external work output at equivalent levels of oxygen uptake were significantly greater while trampolining than running. The greatest difference was about 68%."
- "While trampolining, as long as the G-force remained below 4-G's, the ratio of oxygen consumption compared to biomechanical conditioning was sometimes more than twice as efficient as treadmill running."
- "The G-force measured at the ankle was always more than twice the G-force measured at the back and forehead while running on a treadmill.…While jumping on a trampoline, the G-force was almost the same at all three points, (ankle, back, forehead) and well below the rupture threshold of a normal healthy individual."
- " ...averting the deconditioning that occurs during the immobilization of bed rest or space flight, due to a lack of gravireceptor stimulation (in addition to other factors), requires an acceleration profile that can be delivered at a relatively low metabolic cost….for equivalent metabolic cost, and acceleration profile from jumping [on a trampoline] will provide greater stimuli to gravireceptors."

The NASA study used a "regulation trampoline bed (American Athletic Equipment)...2.74 x 4.56 m and made of nylon webbing supported by springs." The study used a competition-style trampoline, size in feet: 9'x15'. "Each phase of the sequence included a 2-min warm-up, followed by 5 min of jumping. The four heights, measured by the distance the subjects' feet were elevated above the trampoline bed, were 18, 37, 75, and 100 cm. A 5- to 10-min rest period was provided between each jumping level." The jump heights in inches were: 7", 14.6", 29.5" and 39.4". The NASA study did not involve a rebounder or mini-trampoline.
