= Ryze Trampoline Parks =

Chain of trampoline parks

- Product type: Trampoline parks
- Current owner: Sky Zone
- Country: Asia; Europe
- Introduced: 2014
- Website: www.ryze.info

Ryze Trampoline Parks (or simply Ryze) is a chain of trampoline parks operated in Europe and Asia and owned by Sky Zone. Ryze parks are found in Edinburgh, Glasgow, Dundee in Scotland and Hong Kong. The indoor parks contain dozens of interconnected trampolines as well as soft-foam pits, trapezes and slacklines.

== History ==
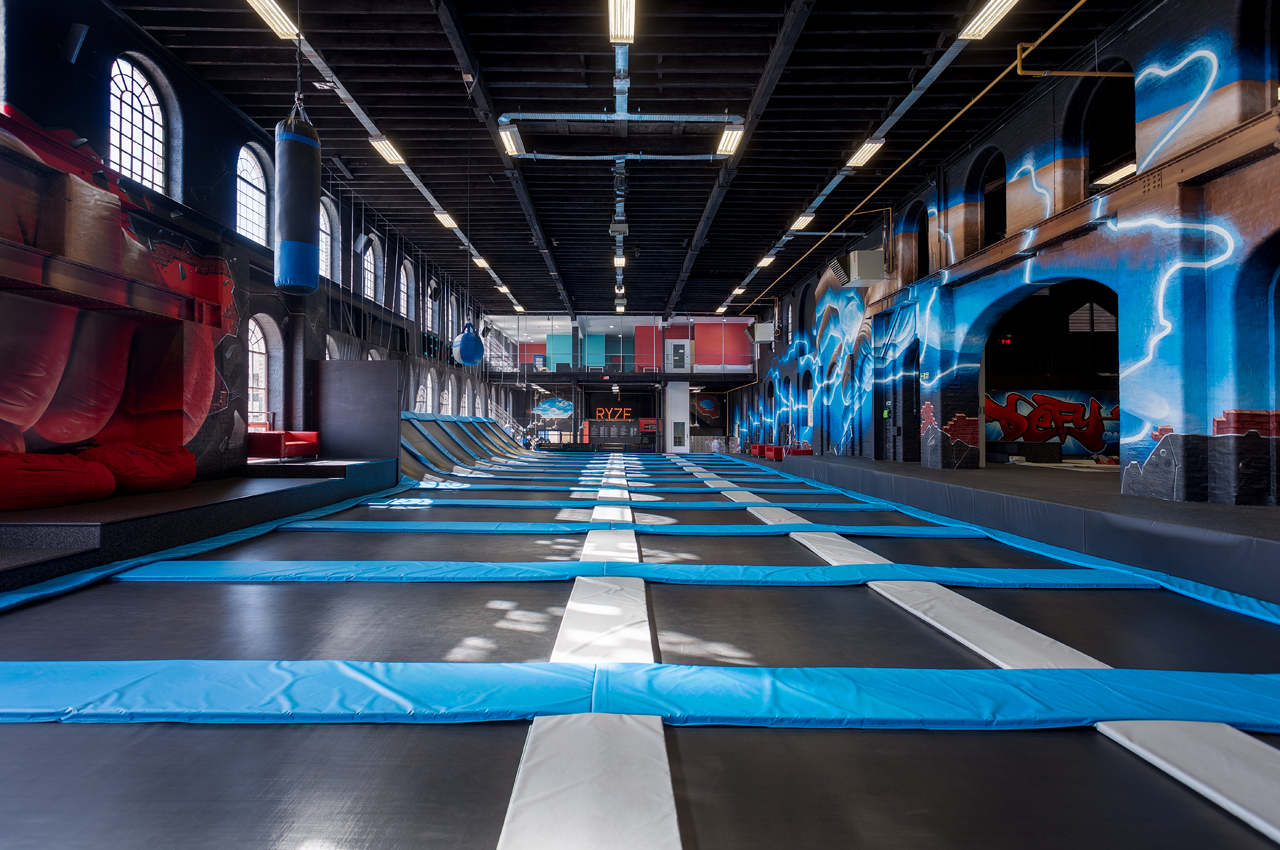
Main jump floor in the former Ryze park located in Glasgow, Scotland.

The chain was launched by CircusTrix in 2014 with the opening of a trampoline park in Hong Kong. The Hong Kong park was announced in January 2014 and opened that July. It was Asia's first indoor trampoline park at the time of its launch. In its first two weeks of operation, Ryze Hong Kong saw around 16,000 customers.

Other Ryze parks are all in Scotland, with the second venue opening in January 2015, at Dalkeith, near Edinburgh. In its first three weeks, Ryze Edinburgh entertained over 25,000 customers. The location was forced to close temporarily after a series of injuries were reported to the Midlothian Council. It was discovered that Ryze Edinburgh did not have the correct indoor sports entertainment licence. They applied for one soon after. Ryze maintained that the injuries represented 0.39% of the customer base, generally considered better than the industry average. Ryze Edinburgh reopened in April 2015 with a licence and instituting several council-mandated and voluntary reforms.

Ryze opened its third park in Kinning Park, Glasgow in April 2015. It was initially supposed to open in February but was delayed by the controversy at the Edinburgh facility. Ryze Glasgow uses an old warehouse that underwent a £1-million renovation prior to its opening. This was later shut down in 2020 due to rent issues because of Covid-19.

In 2016, Ryze announced plans for another trampoline park in Dundee. In 2018, this new Dundee park opened at the site of indoor football pitches

== Parks ==
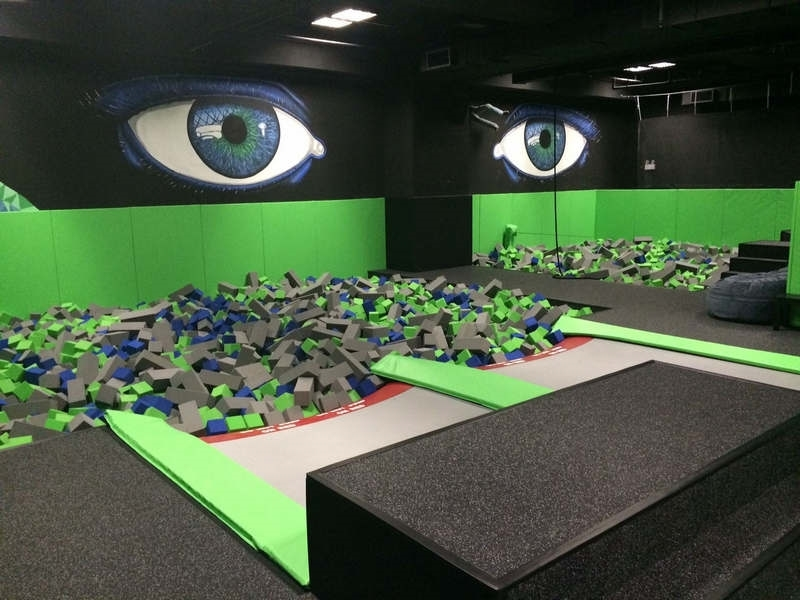
Foam pits and graffiti in the Ryze park located in Hong Kong, China.

The Ryze trampoline parks are located in Hong Kong, Edinburgh, Glasgow and Dundee. All parks contain dozens of interconnected trampolines from wall-to-wall. They typically have basketball and dodgeball "courts," soft-foam pits, "fidget" ladders, "ninja courses," aerial skills sections, and parkour sections.

Ryze Hong Kong covers 18,000 square feet on the third floor of a building on Java Road. Ryze Edinburgh is located in the Mayfield Industrial Estate in Dalkeith and covers 13,000 square feet. Ryze Glasgow is located in a 10,000 square-foot former warehouse in Kinning Park.

In September 2020, Ryze Glasgow announced their closure after they couldn’t agree to new terms with their landlord.
