= Trampoline =

Device people can bounce on for recreational or competitive purposes

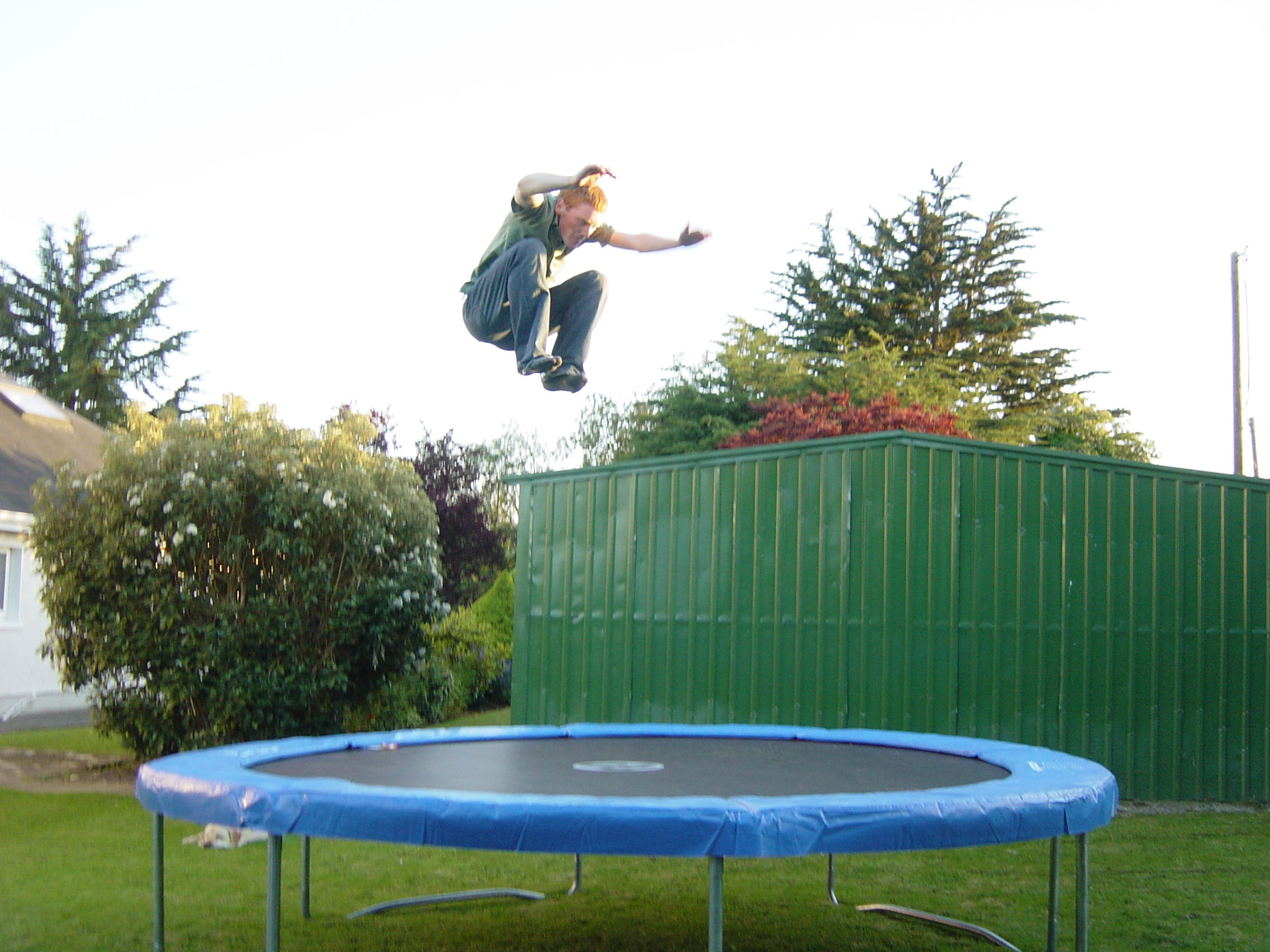
A youth bouncing on a trampoline

A trampoline is a device consisting of a piece of taut, strong fabric stretching between a steel frame often using many coiled springs. People bounce on trampolines for recreational and competitive purposes. Trampolines can also be used for gymnastics.

The fabric that users bounce on (commonly known as the "bounce mat" or "trampoline bed") is not elastic itself; the elasticity is provided by the springs that connect it to the frame, which store potential energy.

== History ==
=== Early trampoline-like devices ===
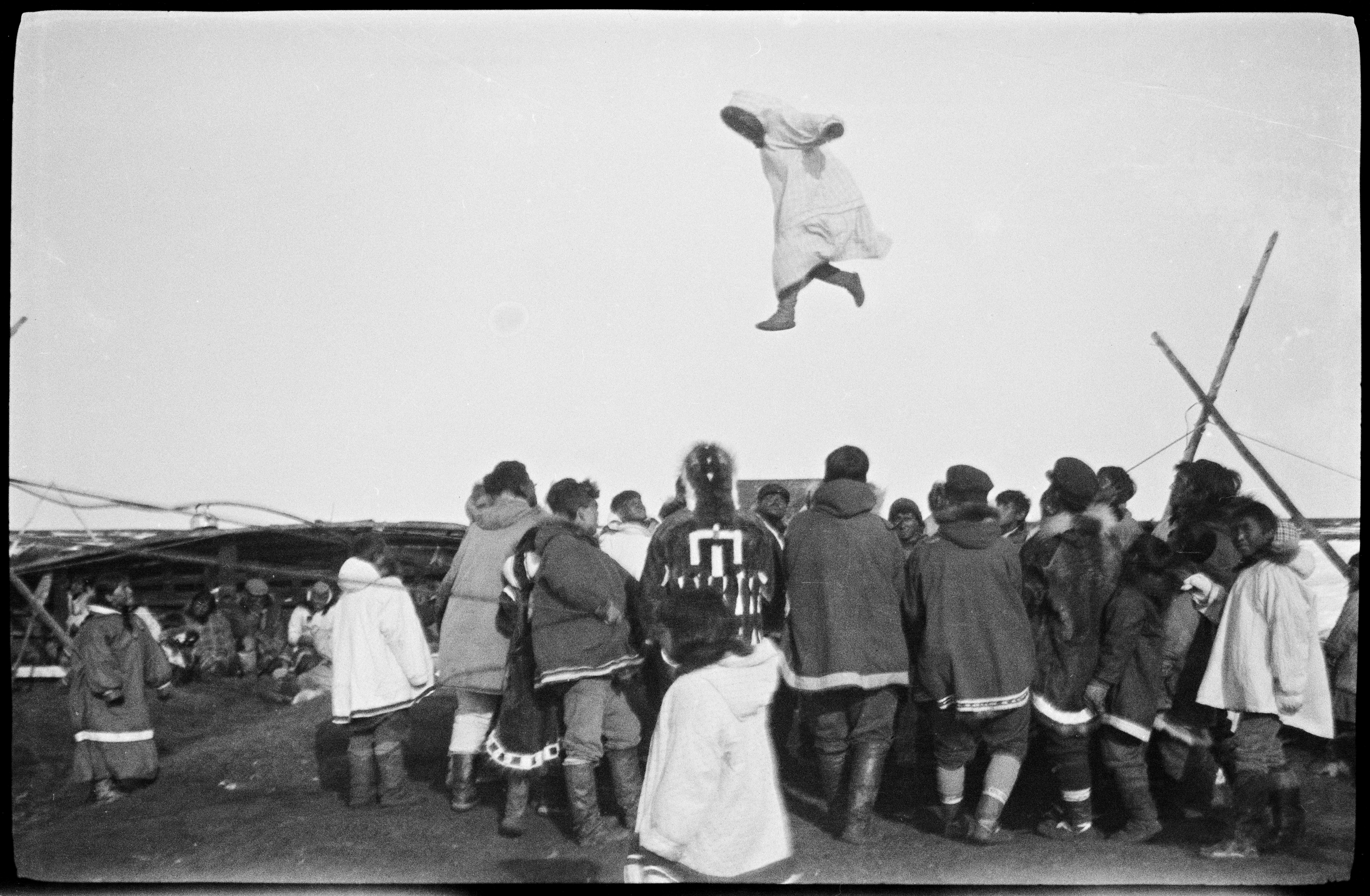
Man jumps on a trampoline in Wainwright, Alaska (1922–1923), during Amundsen's Maud Expedition.

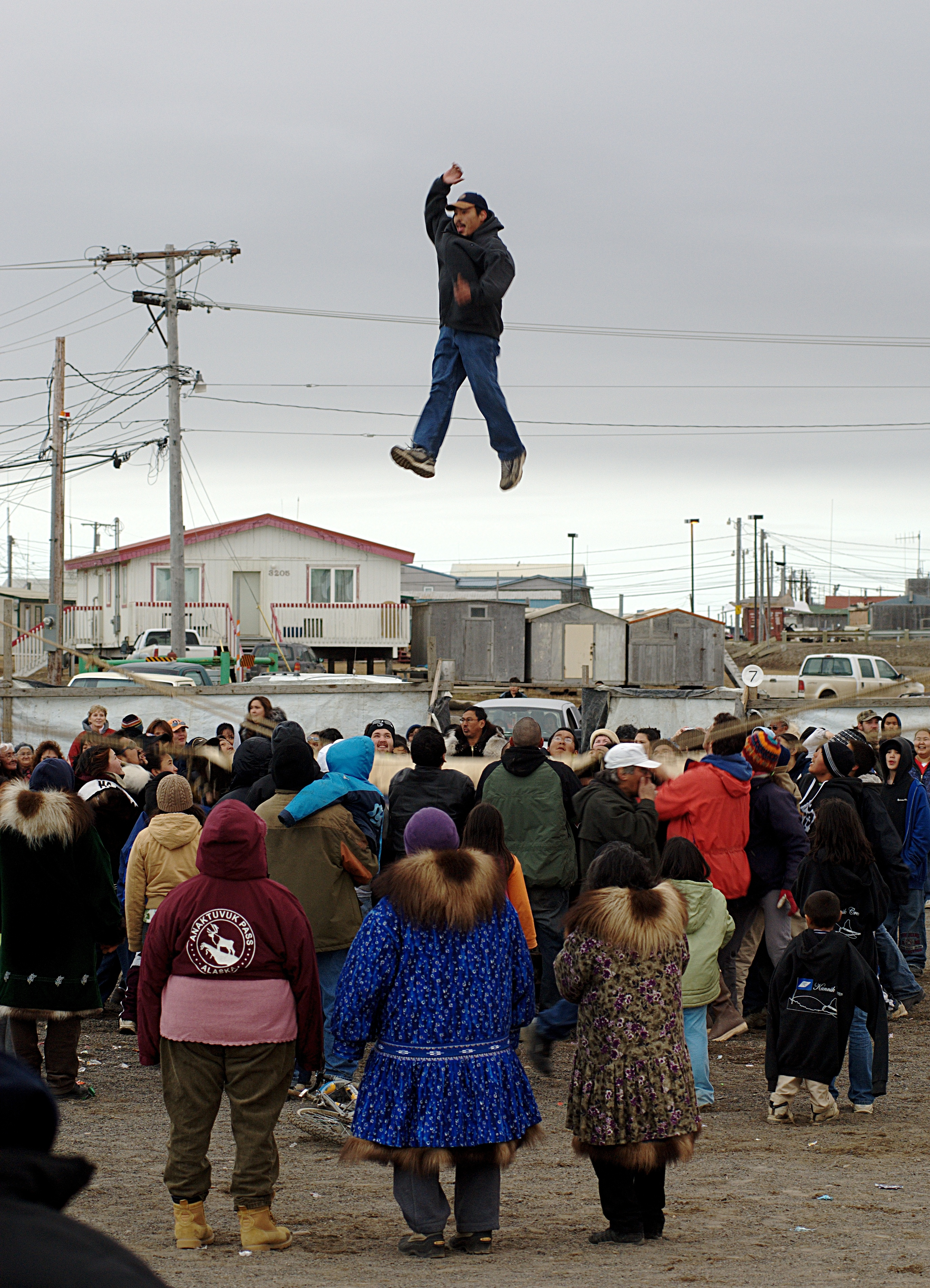
A similar event in Utqiagvik, Alaska (2006), with a crowd gathering in awe.

A game similar to trampolining was developed by the Inuit, who would toss blanket dancers into the air on a walrus skin one at a time (see Nalukataq) during a spring celebration of whale harvest. There is also some evidence of people in Europe having been tossed into the air by a number of people holding a blanket. Mak in the Wakefield Mystery Play The Second Shepherds' Play, and Sancho Panza in Don Quixote, are both subjected to blanketing – however, these are clearly non-voluntary, non-recreational instances of quasi-judicial, mob-administered punishment. The trampoline-like life nets once used by firefighters to catch people jumping out of burning buildings were invented in 1887.

The 19th-century poster for Pablo Fanque's Circus Royal refers to performance on trampoline. The device is thought to have been more like a springboard than the fabric-and-coiled-springs apparatus presently in use.

These may not be the true antecedents of the modern sport of trampolining, but indicate that the concept of bouncing off a fabric surface has been around for some time. In the early years of the 20th century, some acrobats used a "bouncing bed" on the stage to amuse audiences. The bouncing bed was a form of small trampoline covered by bedclothes, on which acrobats performed mostly comedy routines.

According to circus folklore, the trampoline was supposedly first developed by an artiste named du Trampolin, who saw the possibility of using the trapeze safety net as a form of propulsion and landing device and experimented with different systems of suspension, eventually reducing the net to a practical size for separate performance. While trampoline-like devices were used for shows and in the circus, the story of du Trampolin is almost certainly apocryphal. No documentary evidence has been found to support it.

William Daly Paley of Thomas A. Edison, Inc. filmed blanket tossing initiation of a new recruit in Company F, 1st Ohio Volunteers in 1898.

=== First modern trampolines ===
The first modern trampoline was built by George Nissen and Larry Griswold in 1936. Nissen was a gymnastics and diving competitor and Griswold was a tumbler on the gymnastics team, both at the University of Iowa, United States. They had observed trapeze artists using a tight net to add entertainment value to their performance and experimented by stretching a piece of canvas, in which they had inserted grommets along each side, to an angle iron frame by means of coiled springs. It was initially used to train tumblers but soon became popular in its own right. Nissen explained that the name came from the Spanish trampolín, meaning a diving board. Nissen had heard the word on a demonstration tour in Mexico in the late 1930s and decided to use an anglicized form as the trademark for the apparatus.

In 1942, Griswold and Nissen created the Griswold-Nissen Trampoline & Tumbling Company, and began making trampolines commercially in Cedar Rapids, Iowa.

The generic term for the trademarked trampoline was a rebound tumbler and the sport began as rebound tumbling. It has since lost its trademark and has become a generic trademark.

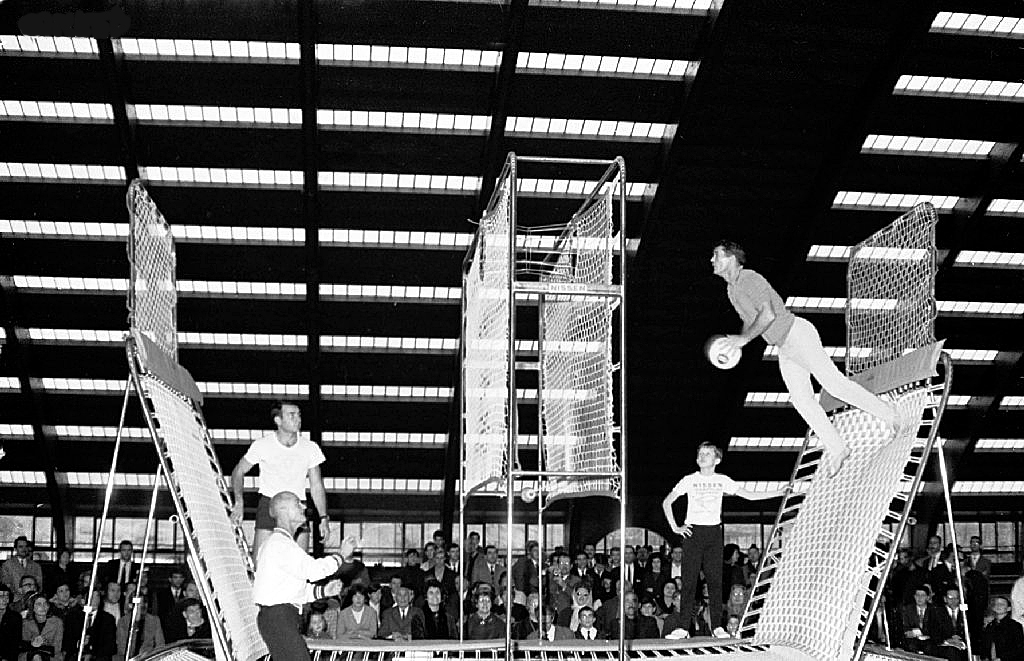
1968 demonstration of Spaceball

Early in their development Nissen anticipated trampolines being used in a number of recreational areas, including those involving more than one participant on the same trampoline. One such game was Spaceball—a game of two teams of two, or played between two individuals, on a single trampoline with specially constructed end "walls" and a middle "wall" through which a ball could be propelled to hit a target on the other side's end wall. Spaceball was created by Nissen together with Scott Carpenter and was used in space training at NASA.

=== Use in flight and astronaut training ===
During World War II, the United States Navy Flight School developed the use of the trampoline in its training of pilots and navigators, giving them concentrated practice in spatial orientation that had not been possible before. After the war, the development of the space flight programme again brought the trampoline into use to help train both American and Soviet astronauts, giving them experience of variable body positions in flight.

=== Competitive sports ===
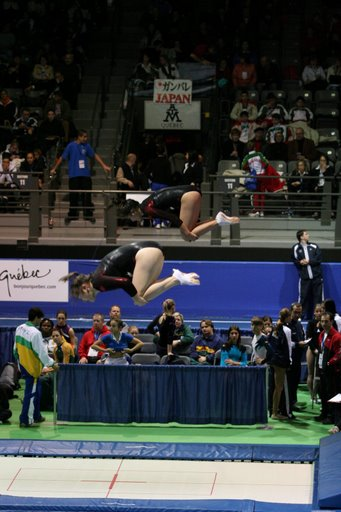
Girls competing in synchronised trampoline

The first Trampoline World Championships were organised by Ted Blake of Nissen, and held in London in 1964. The first World Champions were both American, Dan Millman and Judy Wills Cline. Cline went on to dominate and become the most highly decorated trampoline champion of all time.

One of the earliest pioneers of trampoline as a competitive sport was Jeff Hennessy, a coach at the University of Louisiana at Lafayette. Hennessy also coached the United States trampoline team, producing more world champions than any other person. Among his world champions was his daughter, Leigh Hennessy. Both Jeff and Leigh Hennessy are in the USA Gymnastics Hall of Fame.

The competitive gymnastic sport of trampolining has been part of the Olympic Games since 2000. On a modern competitive trampoline, a skilled athlete can bounce to a height of up to 10 metres (33 ft), performing multiple somersaults and twists. Trampolines also feature in the competitive sports of Slamball, a variant of basketball, and Bossaball, a variant of volleyball.

=== Cross-training for other sports ===
There are a number of other sports that use trampolines to help develop and hone acrobatic skills in training before they are used in the actual sporting venue. Examples can be found in diving, gymnastics, and freestyle skiing. One main advantage of trampolining as a training tool for other acrobatic sports is that it allows repetitive drill practice for acrobatic experience every two seconds or less, compared with many minutes with sports that involve hills, ramps or high platforms. In some situations, it can also be safer compared to landings on the ground.

=== Wall running ===
Wall running is a sport where the participant uses a wall and platforms placed next to the trampoline bed to do tricks. The basic movement is a backdrop on the trampoline and then the feet touching the wall at the top of the bounce. From there, there is no limit to the acrobatic movements that are possible, similar to regular trampolining. The advantage is that twists and turns can be initiated more forcefully from a solid wall and that the vertical speed can be transferred to rotation in addition to forces from the legs or arms. Additionally, energy can be gained both from the bed at the bottom of the bounce, and from the wall at the top of the bounce.

== Types of trampolines ==
=== Recreational trampolines ===
Recreational trampolines for home use are less sturdily constructed than competitive ones, and their springs are weaker. They may be of various shapes, though most are circular, octagonal or rectangular. The fabric is usually a waterproof canvas or woven polypropylene material. As with competitive trampolines, recreational trampolines are typically made using coiled steel springs to provide the rebounding force, but spring-free trampolines also exist.

=== Competitive trampolines ===
The frame of a competitive trampoline is made of steel and can be made to fold up for transportation to competition venues. The trampoline bed is rectangular 4.28 by 2.14 metres (14 ft 1 in × 7 ft 0 in) in size fitted into the 5.05 by 2.91 metres (17 ft × 10 ft) frame with around 110 steel springs (the actual number may vary by manufacturer). The bed is made of a strong fabric that can be woven from webbing, which is the most commonly used material.

=== Bungee trampolines ===
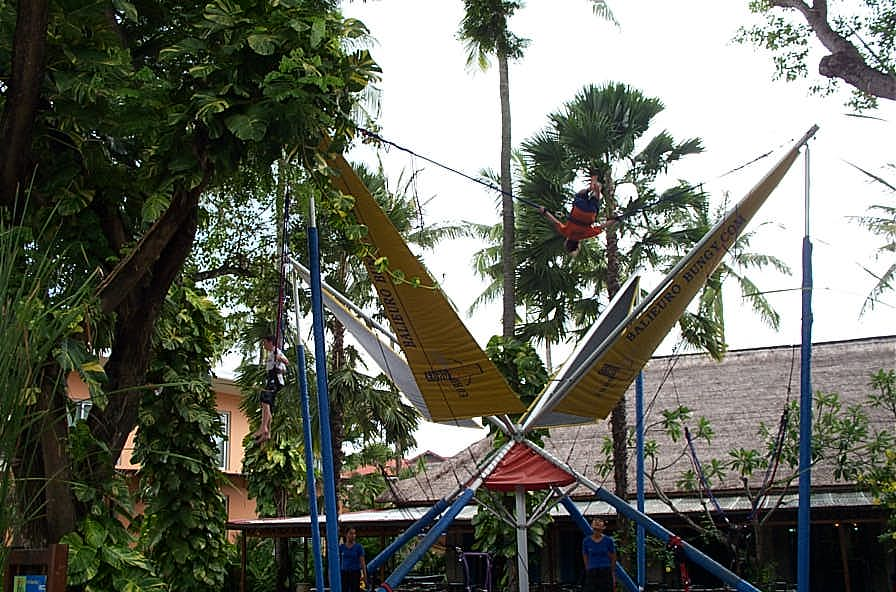
Example of a bungee setup; small, no trampoline version.

A bungee trampoline is an attraction at many fairs, holiday resorts and several summer camps. Some cruise ships have bungee trampolines on board and some ski resorts in the summer. There are different models that range in ease of use and also in ease of setup. Some are on trailers and the number of trampoline mats varies for different models, with four being the most common. There are hydraulic models along with winch models depending on the age and manufacturer of the unit. The bungee cords allow for people without experience in gymnastics to perform flips and other manoeuvres that they would not be able to execute safely without the additional jumping height.

=== Water trampolines ===
Despite being an inflatable device, unlike closed inflatable trampolines, a water trampoline's elasticity is typically not caused by it being inflated. It follows the same principle as a standard land-based trampoline: a bounce mat held by springs. These models allow for a way to combine swimming and trampoline recreation, making it popular for rental amongst lakeside homeowners.

== Commercial trampoline parks ==
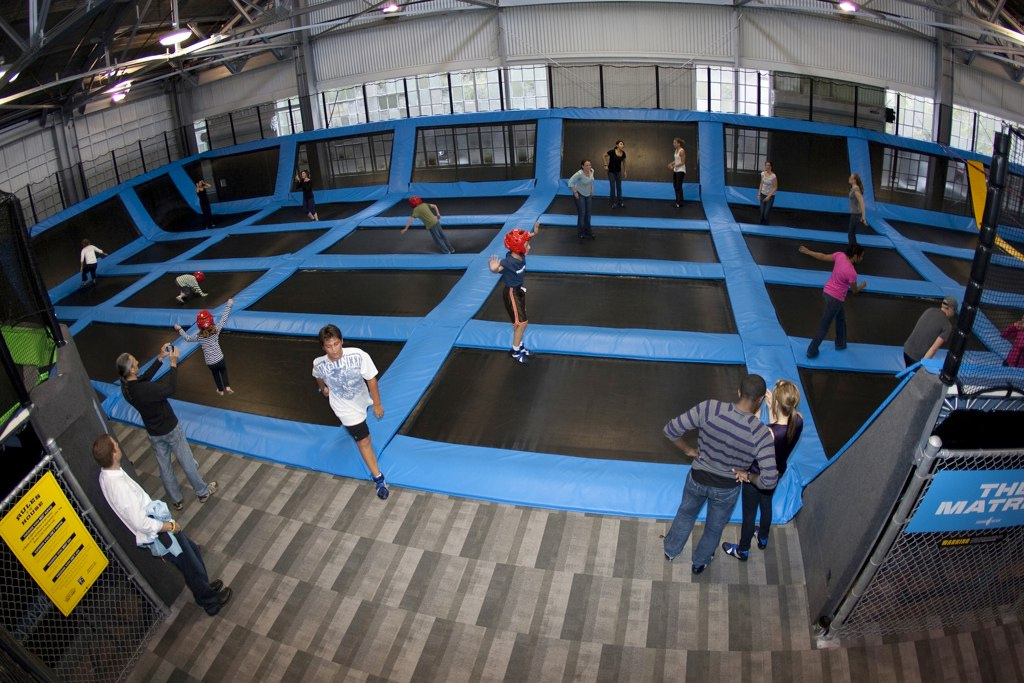
House of Air Trampoline Park in San Francisco

In 1959 and 1960, it became very popular to have outdoor commercial "jump centres" or "trampoline parks" in many places in North America where people could enjoy recreational trampolining. However, these tended to have a high accident rate, and the public's interest rapidly waned.

In the early 21st century, indoor commercial trampoline parks have made a comeback, with a number of franchises operating across the United States and Canada. ABC News has reported that in 2014 there were at least 345 trampoline parks operating in the United States. Similar parks have more recently been opened in other countries. The International Association of Trampoline Parks (IATP) estimated that park numbers had grown from 35–40 parks in 2011 to around 280 in 2014. The following year, IATP estimated that 345 parks were open by the end of 2014, and that another 115 would open by the end of 2015 in North America. IATP also estimated that at the end of 2014 there were 40 parks outside of North America, and that by the end of 2015 there would be at least 100 indoor trampoline parks open internationally. As of March 2019, CircusTrix (and its subsidiary Sky Zone) is the largest operator of trampoline parks in the U.S. and in the world, with 319 parks operating under their brands.

These commercial parks are located indoors, and have wall-to wall-trampolines to prevent people falling off the trampolines on to hard surfaces. Padded or spring walls protect people from impact injuries. Despite these precautions, there has been at least one death recorded due to a head-first landing at a trampoline park. In March 2012, New York Yankees pitcher Joba Chamberlain seriously injured his ankle while jumping at a commercial jump centre in Tampa with his son. In 2018, a man died in a British Columbia trampoline park, which prompted calls for more safety regulations for these popular activities.

== Safety ==
Using a trampoline can be dangerous. Organized clubs and gyms usually have large safety end-decks with foam pads at each end, and spotters are placed alongside the trampoline to try to break the fall of any athlete who loses control and falls. In 1999, the U.S. Consumer Product Safety Commission estimated there were 100,000 hospital emergency room visits for trampoline injuries.

Due to the much larger numbers involved and lower safety standards, the majority of injuries occur on privately owned home trampolines or in commercial trampoline facilities rather than organized gyms.

CBC Television's Marketplace discovered that the trampoline park industry is unregulated in Canada, with different standards for padding and foam pit depth, self-inspections and repairs, and not being required to report injuries. It was also noted that there were generally too few staff to enforce rules, and that promotional advertisements often showed participants engaging in somersaults even though this was extremely dangerous without proper training. All trampoline parks rely upon liability waivers, where the signee assumes the risk of the activity including when injuries result from the establishment's own negligence or poorly maintained equipment, rather than beefing up safety standards and supervision.

Bouncing off a trampoline can result in a fall of 3–4 metres (10–13 ft) from the peak of a bounce to the ground or a fall into the suspension springs and frame. Some medical organizations have suggested that the devices be banned from home use.

Authorities recommend that only one person should be allowed to jump at a time to avoid collisions and people being catapulted in an unexpected direction or higher than they expect. One of the most common sources of injury is when multiple users are bouncing on the trampoline at one time. Often, this situation leads to users bouncing into one another and thus becoming injured; many suffer broken bones as a result of landing badly after knocking into another user.

Another of the most common sources of serious injury is an attempt to perform somersaults without proper training. In some cases, people land on their neck or head, which can cause paralysis or even death. In an infamous incident in the 1960s, pole-vaulting champion Brian Sternberg became paralyzed from the neck down in a trampoline accident.

Danger can be reduced by burying the trampoline so the bed is closer to the surrounding surface to lessen falling distance, and padding that surrounding area. Pads over the spring and frame reduce the severity of impact injuries. Keeping the springs covered also reduces the risk of a limb falling between the gaps in the springs and the rest of the body falling off the trampoline.

Kits are available for home trampolines that provide a retaining net around the trampoline and prevent users from bouncing over the edge. The American Academy of Pediatrics states that there is no epidemiological evidence that these improve safety. The nets do prevent jumpers falling off the trampoline onto the ground, but these falls are not the most common source of injury. Multiple users bouncing in a netted trampoline can still be injured. Safety net enclosures have a larger benefit for safeguarding solo trampolinists, so long as they avoid falling on their head or neck.

Having some training in a gym may be beneficial in alerting people to possible hazards and provide techniques to avoid bad falls.

Family-oriented commercial areas in North America, such as shopping centres, carnivals, and so on, often include closed inflatable trampolines (CITs) as a children's attraction. These have safety nets on the sides to prevent injuries.

=== Socks ===
Trampoline socks
- Other name: Trampolining socks
- Definition: Socks designed for trampoline use
- Type: Trampoline protective equipment
- Core function: Reduction of friction injuries

Trampoline socks, also known as trampolining socks, are socks that are specifically designed for trampoline use. These types of socks have rubber soles that help feet stick to mats or other smooth surfaces. They are special socks that provide better traction on trampolines. In the early days, these socks were primarily used to prevent injuries to trampolinists, who wore them during trampoline gymnastics. Nowadays, they are not only limited to be used by professional athletes. Ordinary adults and kids can also use them.

Compared to regular socks, trampoline socks have good grip. These particular socks are essentially stretchable, non-slip socks. They are mainly used in the trampoline park industry. When entering a trampoline park, people are obliged to wear these special socks. The representative producers of these types of socks include Urban Air, Gripjoy, Innovate Knitting, and ESA Supplies.

One of the early trampoline socks were introduced in May 2006 by Michael Wood, a design student at the University of Dundee.

== Mini-trampolines ==
A mini-trampoline (also known as a rebounder, trampette, jogging trampoline, or exercise trampoline) is a type of trampoline less than 1 metre (3 ft 3 in) in diameter and about 30 centimetres (12 in) off the ground, often kept indoors and used as part of a physical fitness regime. So-called rebounding provides a form of exercise with a low impact on knees and joints. Mini-trampolines do not give a rebound as high as larger recreational or competitive trampolines. Most department and big-box stores sell mini-trampolines.

== Educational use ==
Trampoline activity has been used by science teachers to illustrate Newton's three laws of motion, as well as the "elastic collision."

== Gallery ==
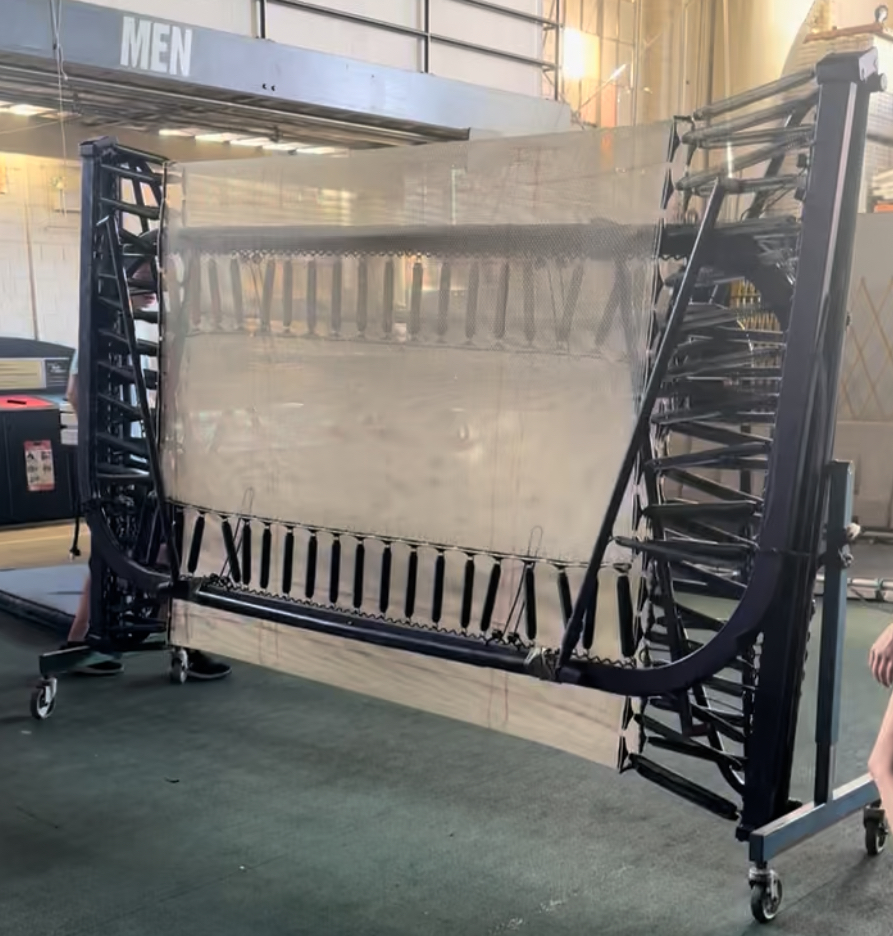
Competition trampoline, folded for transport

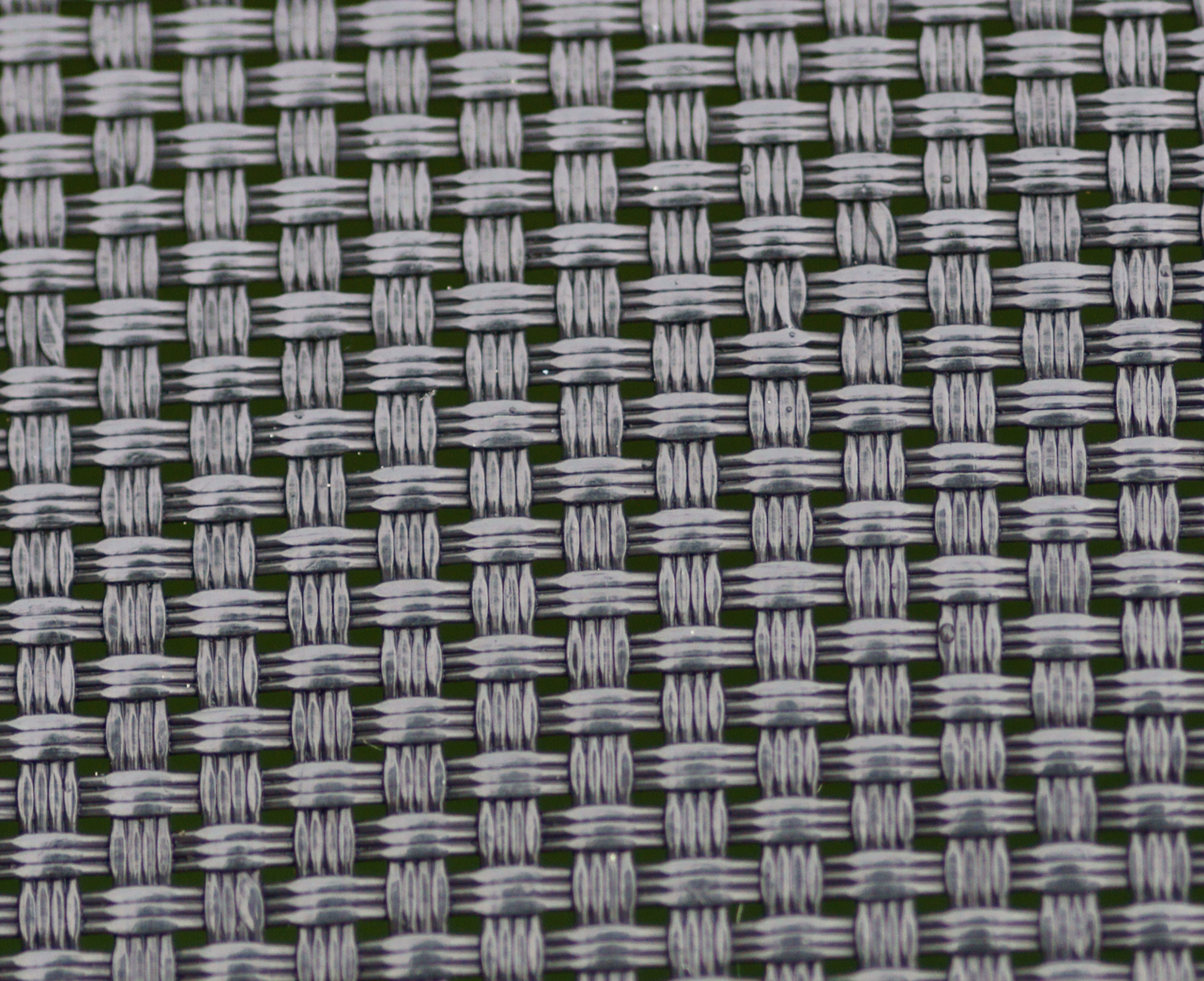
Magnified view of a bounce mat

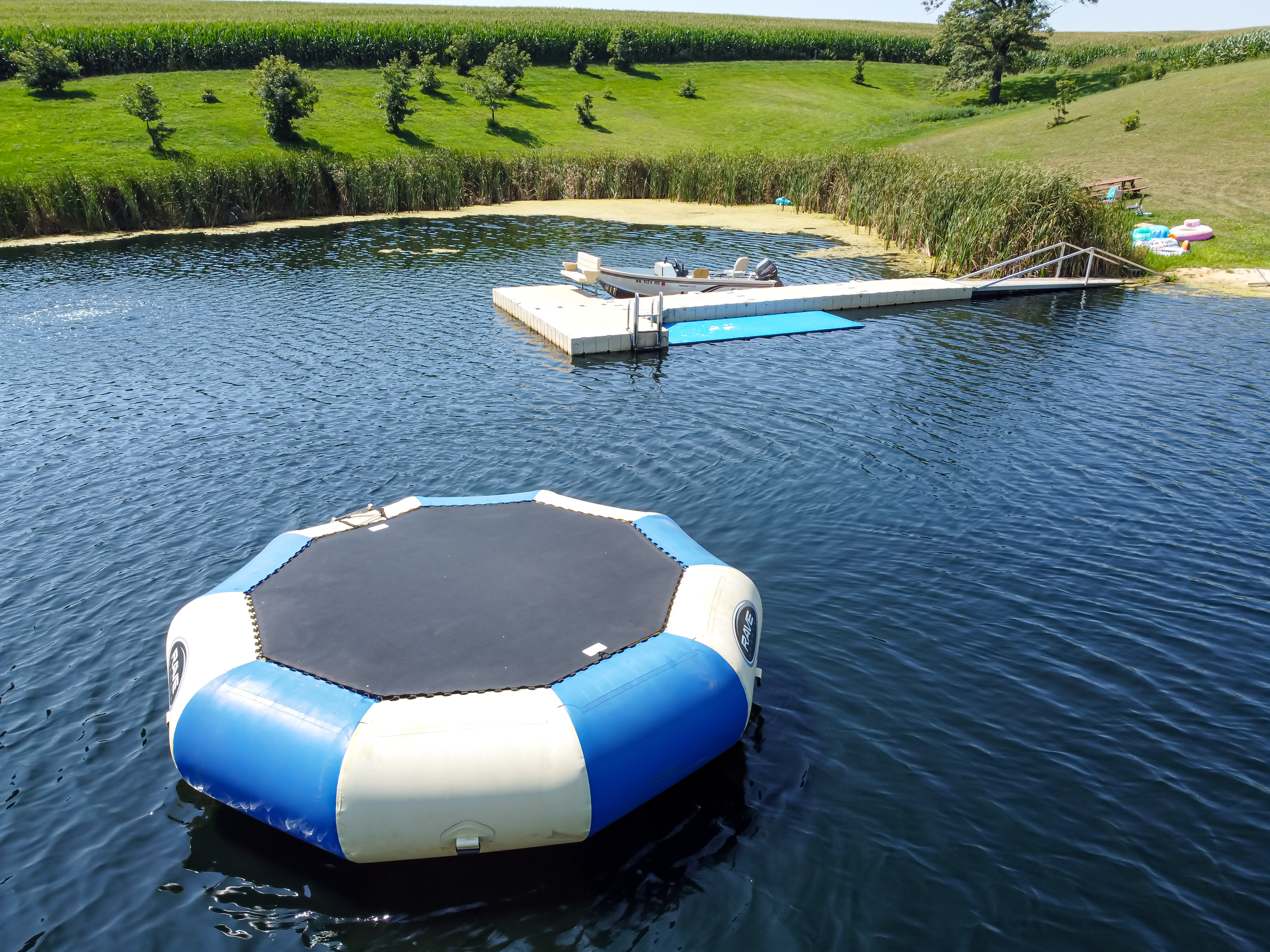
Water trampoline

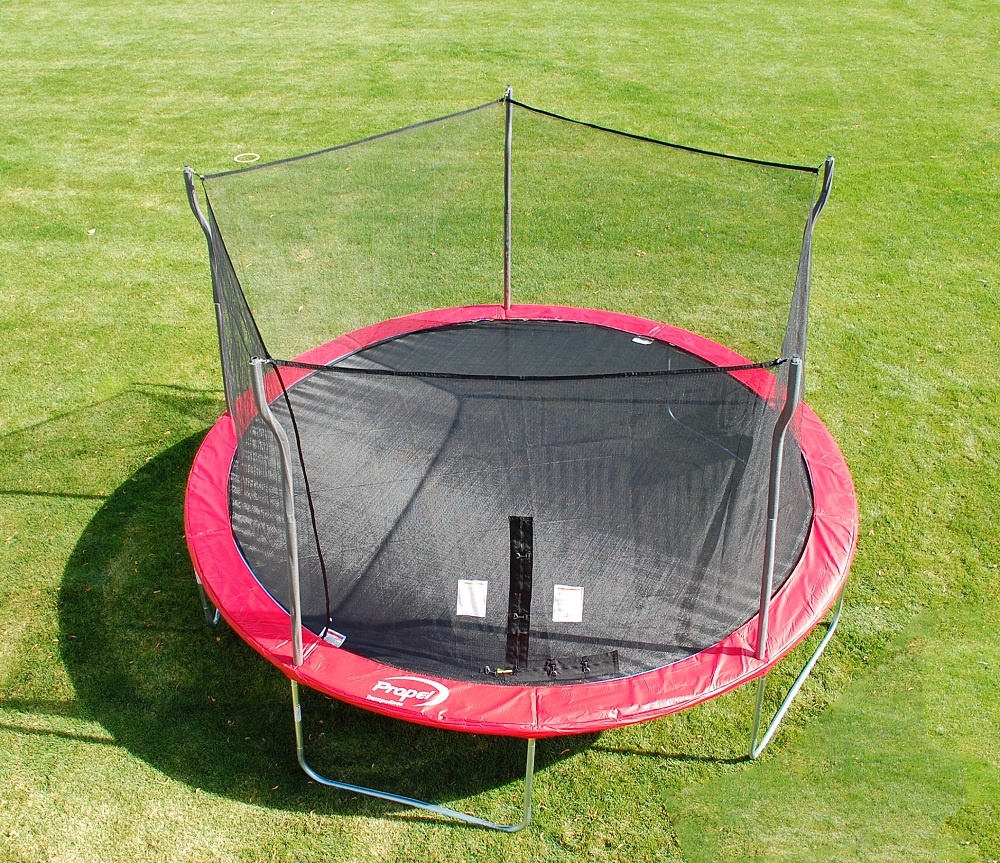
With safety nets, the risk of falling off the trampoline is reduced.

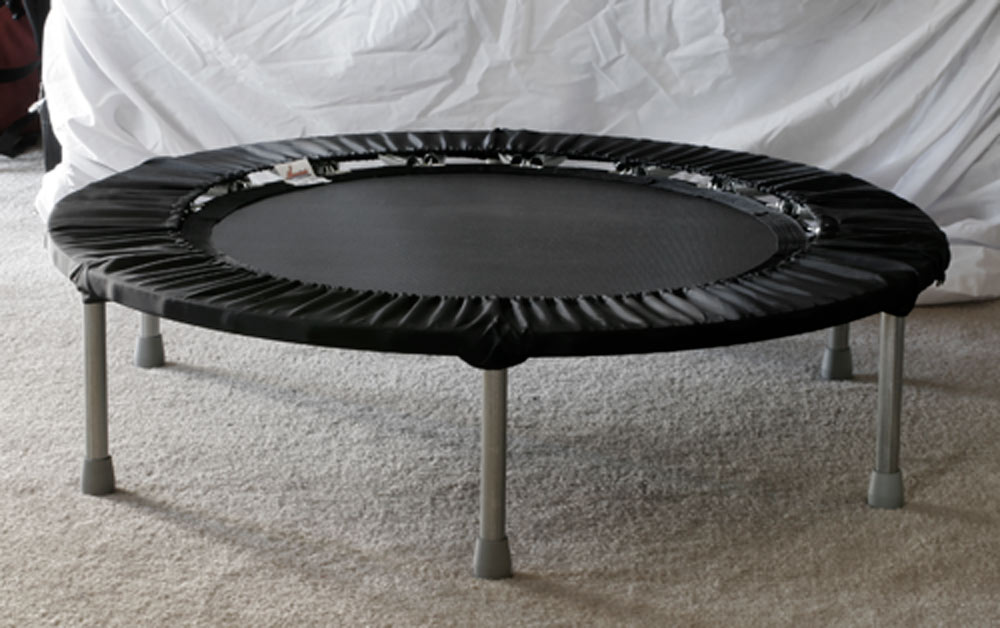
Mini-trampoline
